= Perama =

Perama Πέραμα
- Municipality
- Ships at Perama

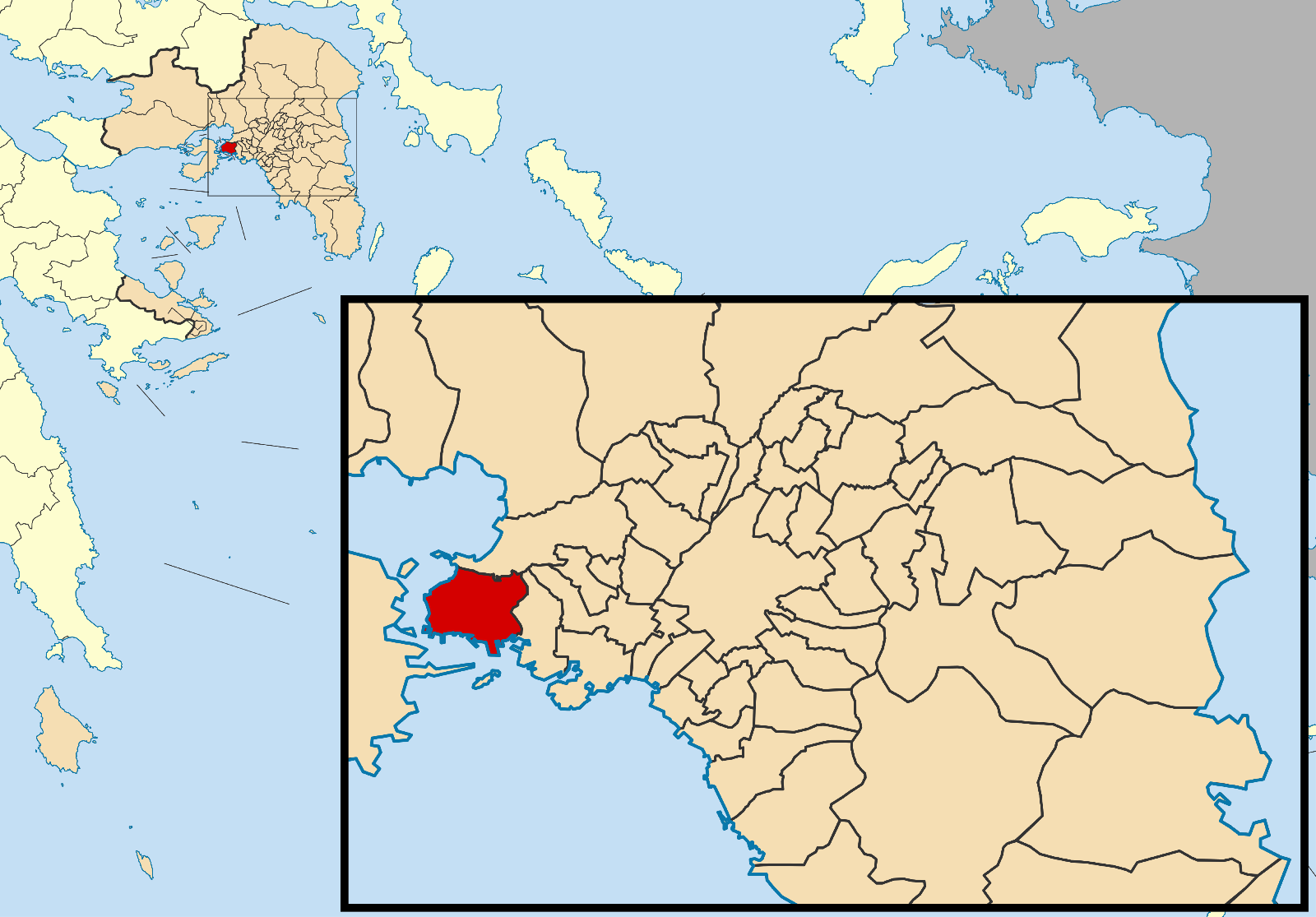

- Location within Greece
- Coordinates: 37°58′N 23°34′E
- Country: Greece
- Administrative region: Attica
- Regional unit: Piraeus

Government
  - Mayor: Ioannis Lagoudakos (since 2023)

Area
  - Municipality: 14.729 km^{2} (5.687 sq mi)
- Elevation: 5 m (16 ft)

Population (2021)
  - Municipality: 25,628
  - Density: 1,740.0/km^{2} (4,506.5/sq mi)
- Time zone: UTC+2 (EET)
  - Summer (DST): UTC+3 (EEST)
- Postal code: 188 63
- Area code: 210
- Vehicle registration: Z
- Website: www.perama.gr

Perama (Greek: Πέραμα) is a coastal town and a suburb of Piraeus. It belongs to the Piraeus regional unit and is the southwestern limit of Athens-Piraeus urban area. It lies on the southwest edge of the Aegaleo mountains, on the Saronic Gulf coast. It is 8 km northwest of Piraeus, and 14 km west of the center of Athens. The municipality has an area of 14.729 km^{2}. It forms the western terminus of the Port of Piraeus, and there is also a passenger port that provides ferry services to Salamis Island.

The name Perama comes from the Greek word "perasma" which means "passage". Perama has a secondary soccer team named Peramaikos. The Battle of Salamis which took place in 480BC was located between the Salamis island and the mainland, part of which included Perama.

== Historical population ==
Year	Municipality
1981	23,012
1991	24,119
2001	25,720
2011	25,389
2021	25,628

== Climate ==
According to the station of the National Observatory of Athens Perama has a hot semi-arid climate (Köppen climate classification: BSh) with mild winters and hot summers.

Climate data for Perama 45 m a.s.l.
Month	Jan	Feb	Mar	Apr	May	Jun	Jul	Aug	Sep	Oct	Nov	Dec	Year
Record high °C (°F)	22.1 (71.8)	22.3 (72.1)	24.9 (76.8)	32.1 (89.8)	34.8 (94.6)	41.9 (107.4)	42.1 (107.8)	43.2 (109.8)	38.3 (100.9)	31.1 (88.0)	28.3 (82.9)	22.1 (71.8)	43.2 (109.8)
Mean daily maximum °C (°F)	14.0 (57.2)	15.7 (60.3)	17.5 (63.5)	20.8 (69.4)	25.4 (77.7)	30.3 (86.5)	33.9 (93.0)	33.6 (92.5)	29.4 (84.9)	24.5 (76.1)	20.3 (68.5)	15.9 (60.6)	23.4 (74.2)
Daily mean °C (°F)	11.3 (52.3)	12.7 (54.9)	14.2 (57.6)	17.3 (63.1)	21.8 (71.2)	26.4 (79.5)	29.9 (85.8)	29.8 (85.6)	25.9 (78.6)	21.4 (70.5)	17.4 (63.3)	13.3 (55.9)	20.1 (68.2)
Mean daily minimum °C (°F)	8.5 (47.3)	9.7 (49.5)	10.9 (51.6)	13.7 (56.7)	18.1 (64.6)	22.4 (72.3)	25.9 (78.6)	26.0 (78.8)	22.3 (72.1)	18.3 (64.9)	14.5 (58.1)	10.6 (51.1)	16.7 (62.1)
Record low °C (°F)	−1.6 (29.1)	−0.5 (31.1)	1.4 (34.5)	5.4 (41.7)	13.3 (55.9)	16.0 (60.8)	19.3 (66.7)	20.1 (68.2)	15.6 (60.1)	12.4 (54.3)	6.8 (44.2)	1.1 (34.0)	−1.6 (29.1)
Average rainfall mm (inches)	51.8 (2.04)	33.1 (1.30)	31.1 (1.22)	22.3 (0.88)	19.7 (0.78)	23.8 (0.94)	6.9 (0.27)	6.3 (0.25)	38.5 (1.52)	37.0 (1.46)	60.5 (2.38)	56.1 (2.21)	387.1 (15.25)
Source 1: National Observatory of Athens Monthly Bulletins (Apr 2015 - Mar 2024)
Source 2: Perama N.O.A station, World Meteorological Organization

== Politics ==
Parliamentary election results since 2000
6/2023	5/2023	2019	9/2015	1/2015	6/2012
1. ND 38.55%; 2. SYRIZA 17.79%; 3. KKE 11.59%; 4. PASOK 6.95%; 5. Spartans 6.84%; 6. EL 5.18%; 7. PE 3.77%; 8. Victory 2.73%; 9. MERA25 2.12%; 10. Others 4.48%	1. ND 38.61%; 2. SYRIZA 18.57%; 3. KKE 10.93%; 4. PASOK 6.84%; 5. PE 5.40%; 6. EL 5.13%; 7. MERA25 2.54%; 8. Victory 2.06%; 9. SA 1.13%; 10. KFE 1.12%; 11. OP 1.10%; 12. Others 6.57%	1. SYRIZA 37.02%; 2. ND 32.16%; 3. KKE 8.14%; 4. EL 4.49%; 5. PASOK 4.30%; 6. XA 4.10%; 7. MERA25 3.82%; 8. PE 2.39%; 9. EK 1.58%; 10. Others 2.00%	1. SYRIZA 41.97%; 2. ND 18.45%; 3. XA 10.17%; 4. KKE 7.99%; 5. ANEL 4.34%; 6. PASOK 3.52%; 7. LAE 3.47%; 8. EK 3.32%; 9. River 2.70%; 10. EPAM 1.13%; 11. Others 2.94%	1. SYRIZA 40.99%; 2. ND 19.98%; 3. XA 9.01%; 4. KKE 7.96%; 5. ANEL 5.51%; 6. River 4.70%; 7. Teleia 2.93%; 8. PASOK 2.59%; 9. EK 1.87%; 10. KIDISO 1.56%; 11. LAOS 1.23%; 12. Others 1.67%	1. SYRIZA 35.79%; 2. ND 19.37%; 3. XA 10.91%; 4. ANEL 9.65%; 5. PASOK 7.08%; 6. KKE 6.18%; 7. DIMAR 4.94%; 8. LAOS 1.88%; 9. Others 4.20%
5/2012	2009	2007	2004	2000	
1. SYRIZA 22.03%; 2. KKE 12.07%; 3. ANEL 12.05%; 4. XA 11.49%; 5. ND 11.03%; 6. PASOK 6.91%; 7. DIMAR 5.84%; 8. OP 3.46%; 9. LAOS 2.79%; 10. DISY 2.68%; 11. DIXA 1.54%; 12. KDP 1.28%; 13. KOISY 1.02%; 14. Others 5.81%	1. PASOK 44.36%; 2. ND 24.70%; 3. KKE 12.15%; 4. LAOS 7.56%; 5. SYRIZA 4.69%; 6. OP 3.36%; 7. Others 3.18%	1. PASOK 37.83%; 2. ND 33.79%; 3. KKE 13.38%; 4. SYRIZA 5.60%; 5. LAOS 5.11%; 6. OP 1.50%; 7. Others 2.79%	1. PASOK 40.31%; 2. ND 39.07%; 3. KKE 10.88%; 4. LAOS 2.91%; 5. SYRIZA 2.83%; 6. DIKKI 2.39%; 7. Others 1.61%	1. PASOK 44.22%; 2. ND 36.10%; 3. KKE 8.70%; 4. Coalition 4.27%; 5. DIKKI 4.05%; 6. Others 2.66%	

European Parliament election results since 1999
2024	2019	2014	2009	2004	1999
1. ND 25.47%; 2. SYRIZA 16.89%; 3. KKE 14.57%; 4. EL 10.82%; 5. PASOK 7.22%; 6. PE 4.41%; 7. FL 3.96%; 8. Victory 3.20%; 9. MERA25 2.16%; 10. Patriots 2.01%; 11. NA 1.79%; 12. Cosmos 1.32%; 13. Others 6.18%	1. ND 26.10%; 2. SYRIZA 25.45%; 3. KKE 8.76%; 4. XA 7.82%; 5. EL 5.05%; 6. PASOK 4.15%; 7. MERA25 3.27%; 8. PE 2.83%; 9. EK 1.55%; 10. Citizens 1.52%; 11. River 1.48%; 12. LAOS 1.45%; 13. AD 1.07%; 14. Others 9.50%	1. SYRIZA 30.10%; 2. ND 15.85%; 3. XA 13.79%; 4. KKE 8.66%; 5. River 6.27%; 6. PASOK 4.88%; 7. ANEL 4.19%; 8. LAOS 3.06%; 9. OP-KPE 1.41%; 10. KEK 1.34%; 11. EPAM 1.29%; 12. Others 9.16%	1. PASOK 36.33%; 2. ND 23.55%; 3. KKE 14.07%; 4. LAOS 8.56%; 5. SYRIZA 4.68%; 6. OP 3.92%; 7. KEK 1.40%; 8. EO 1.14%; 9. XA 1.06%; 10. Others 5.29%	1. ND 36.44%; 2. PASOK 34.39%; 3. KKE 14.97%; 4. LAOS 4.95%; 5. Coalition 3.81%; 6. Others 5.44%	1. PASOK 30.16%; 2. ND 29.35%; 3. KKE 13.42%; 4. DIKKI 8.93%; 5. Coalition 6.08%; 6. KEK 1.65%; 7. POLAN 1.64%; 8. EK 1.41%; 9. Kollatos 1.06%; 10. Others 6.30%

== See also ==
- List of settlements in Attica
