= Rhodope (constituency) =

Parliamentary constituency of Greece

- Electoral constituency for the Hellenic Parliament
- Rhodope within Greece
- Regional units: Rhodope
- Administrative region: Eastern Macedonia and Thrace
- Population: 118,177 (2015)

Current constituency
- Created: 2012
- Number of members: 3

The Rhodope electoral constituency (Greek: περιφέρεια Ροδόπης) is a parliamentary constituency of Greece.

== Election Results ==
=== Parliamentary ===
1996

2000

2004

2007

2009

5/2012

6/2012

1/2015

9/2015

2019

5/2023

6/2023

=== European ===
2009

2014

2019

2024

== See also ==
- List of parliamentary constituencies of Greece
