= 2024 European Parliament election in Greece =

- 9 June 2024

21 seats in the European Parliament
- Turnout: 41.39%
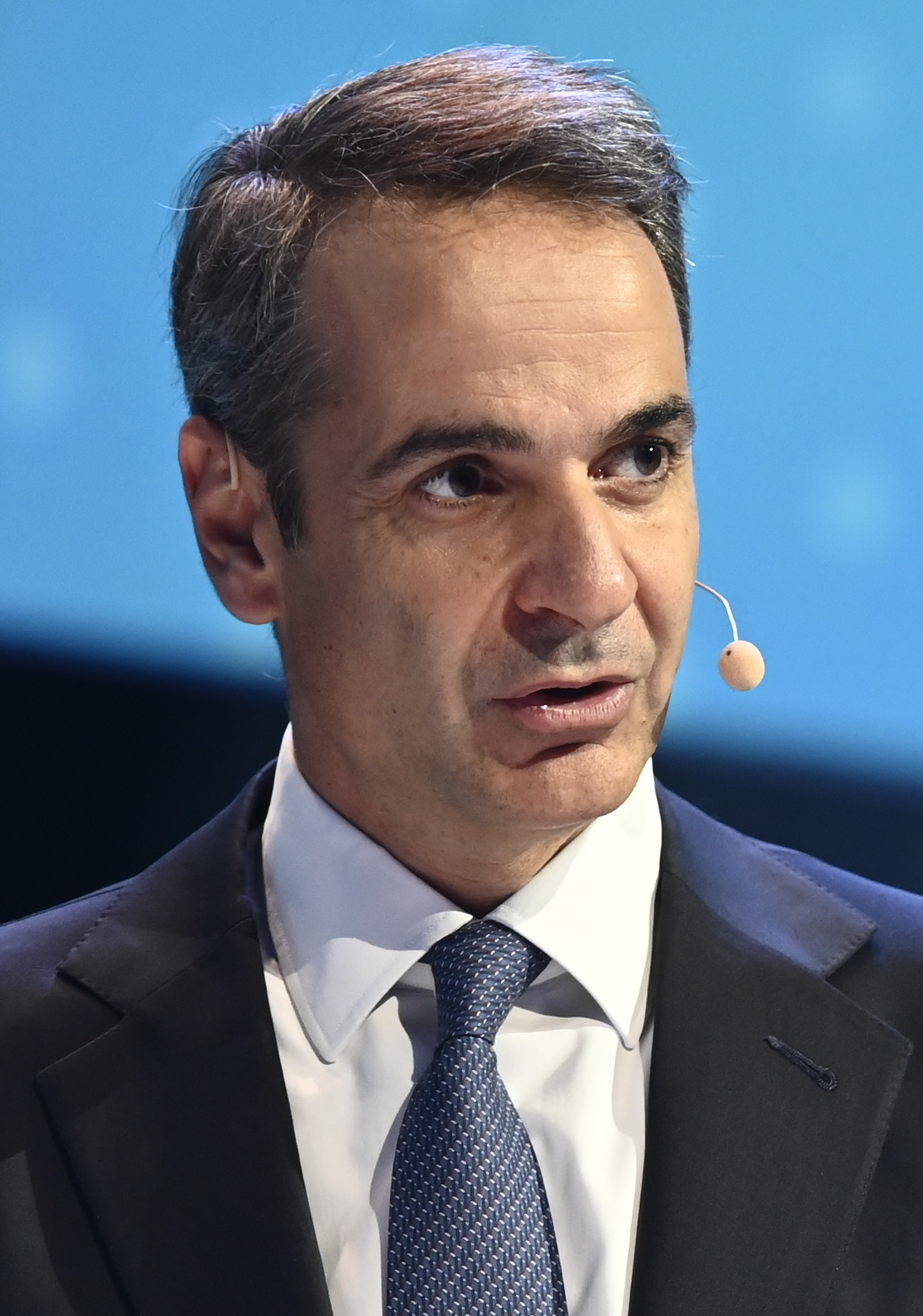

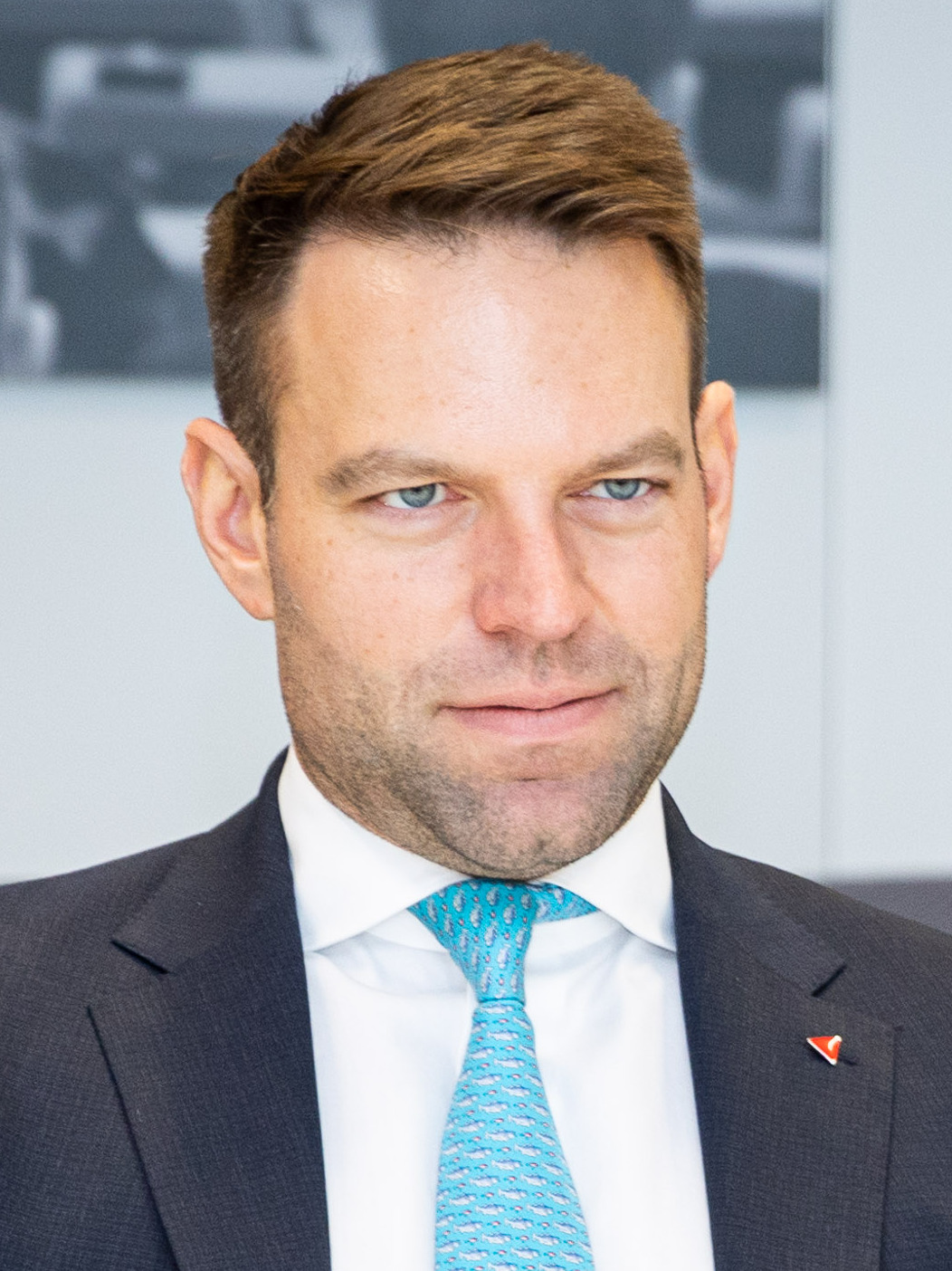

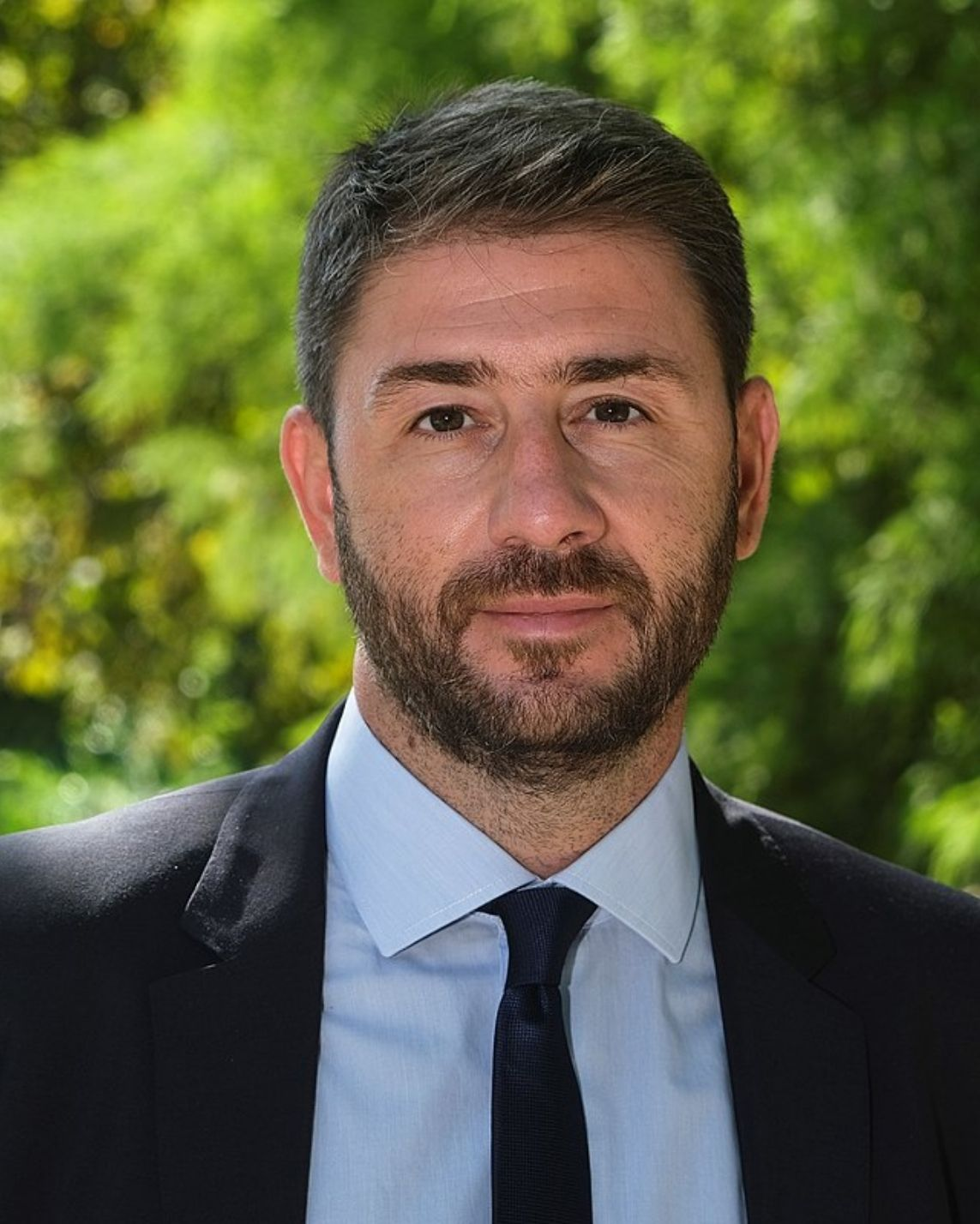

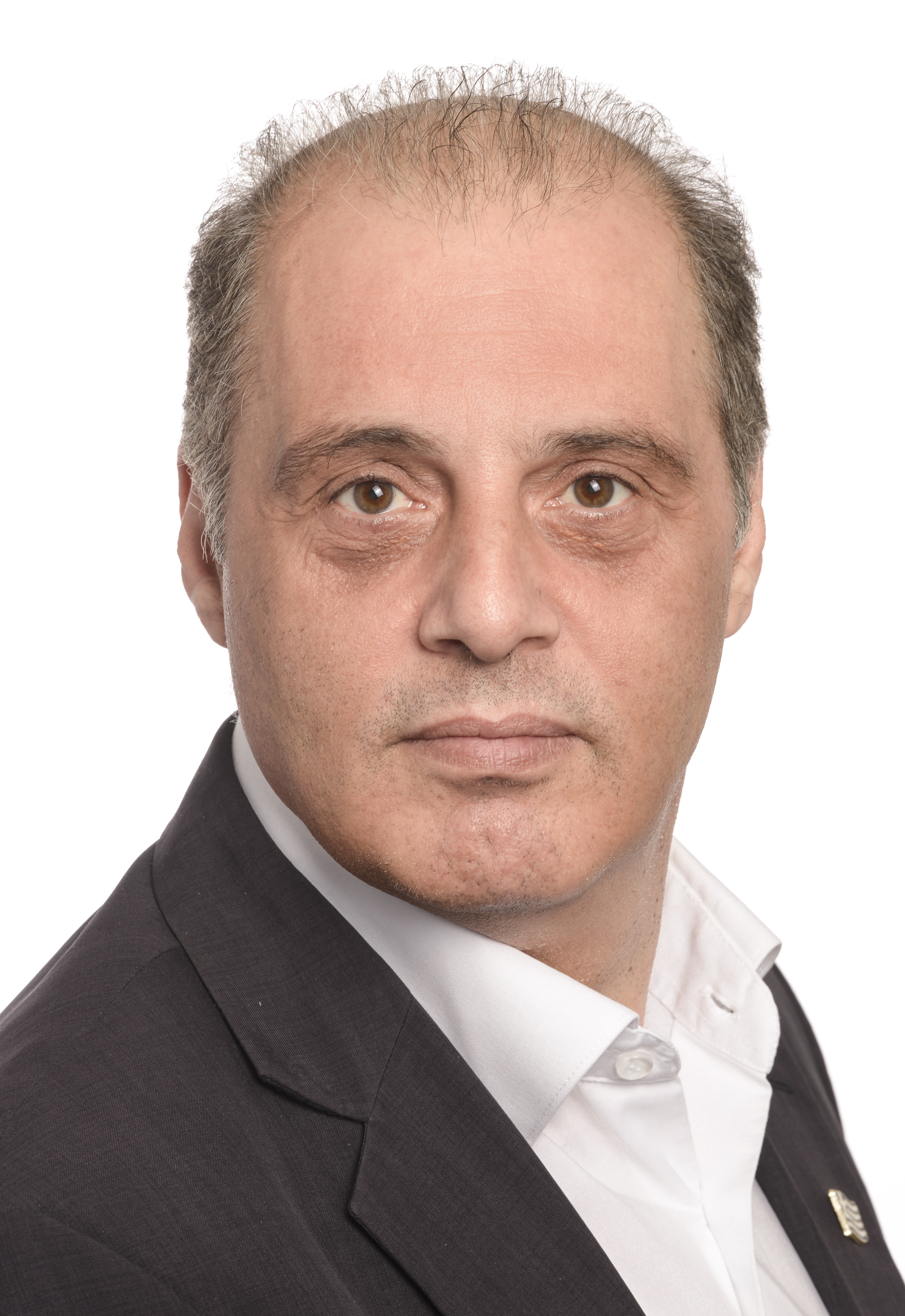

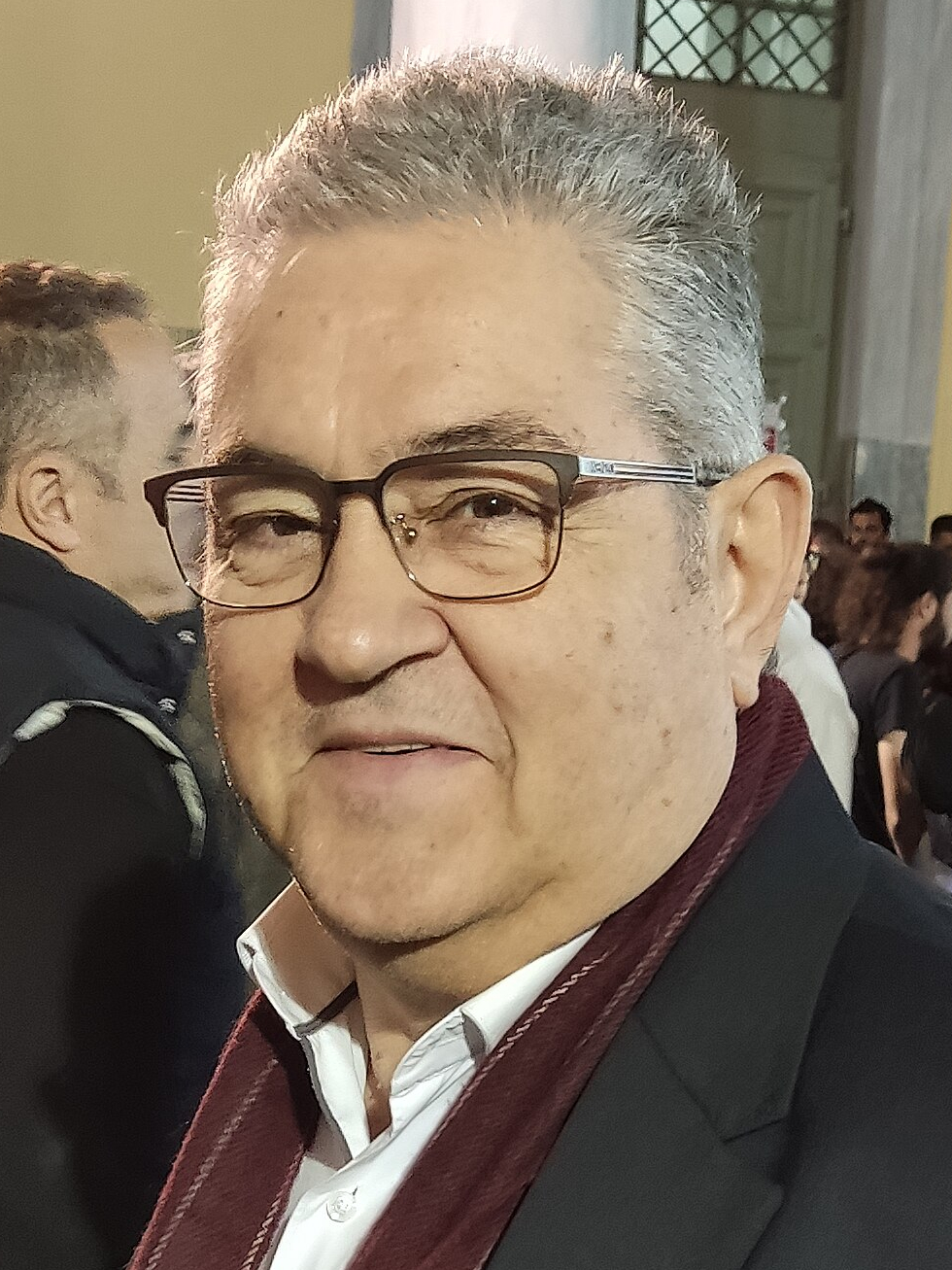

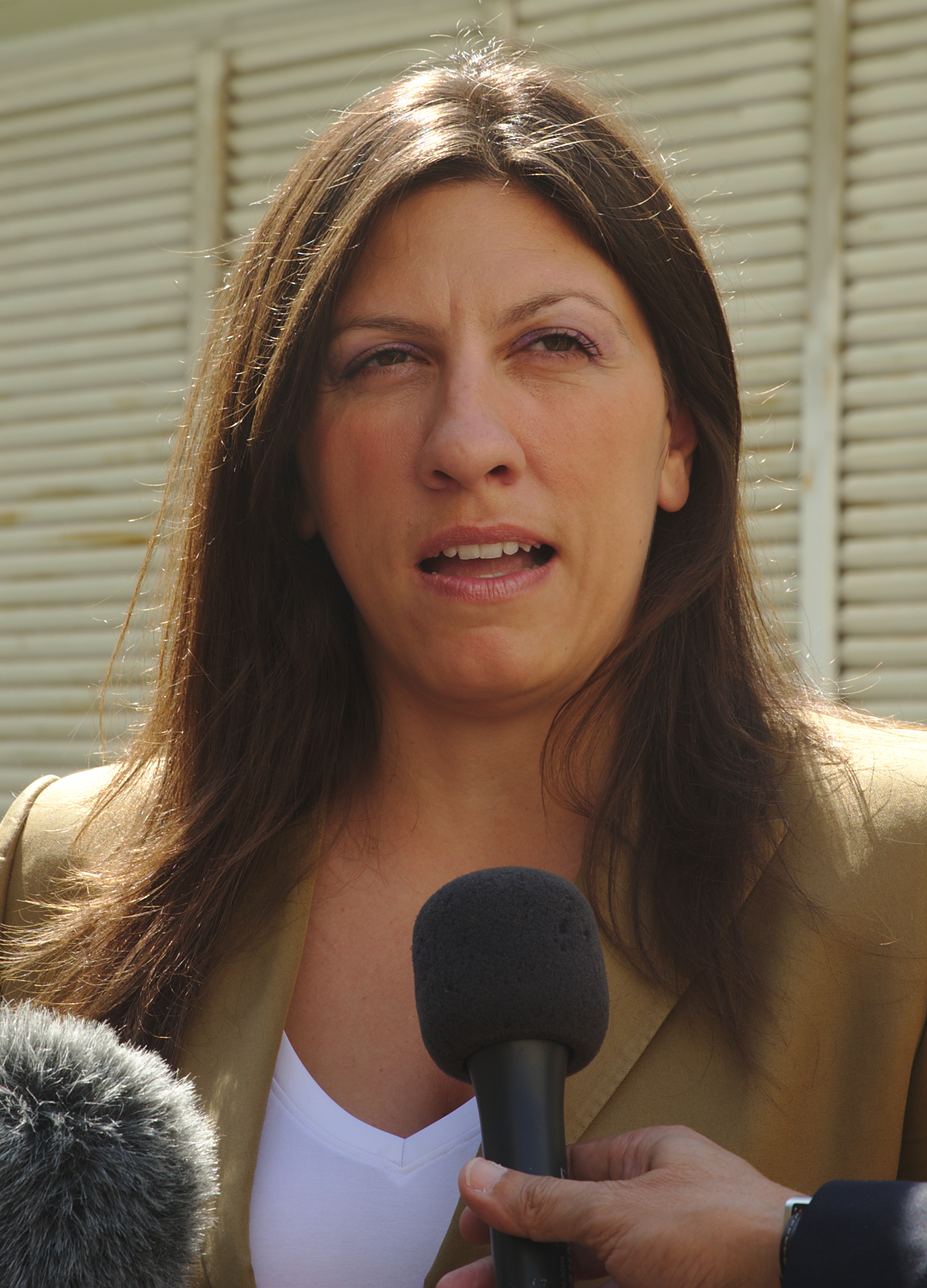

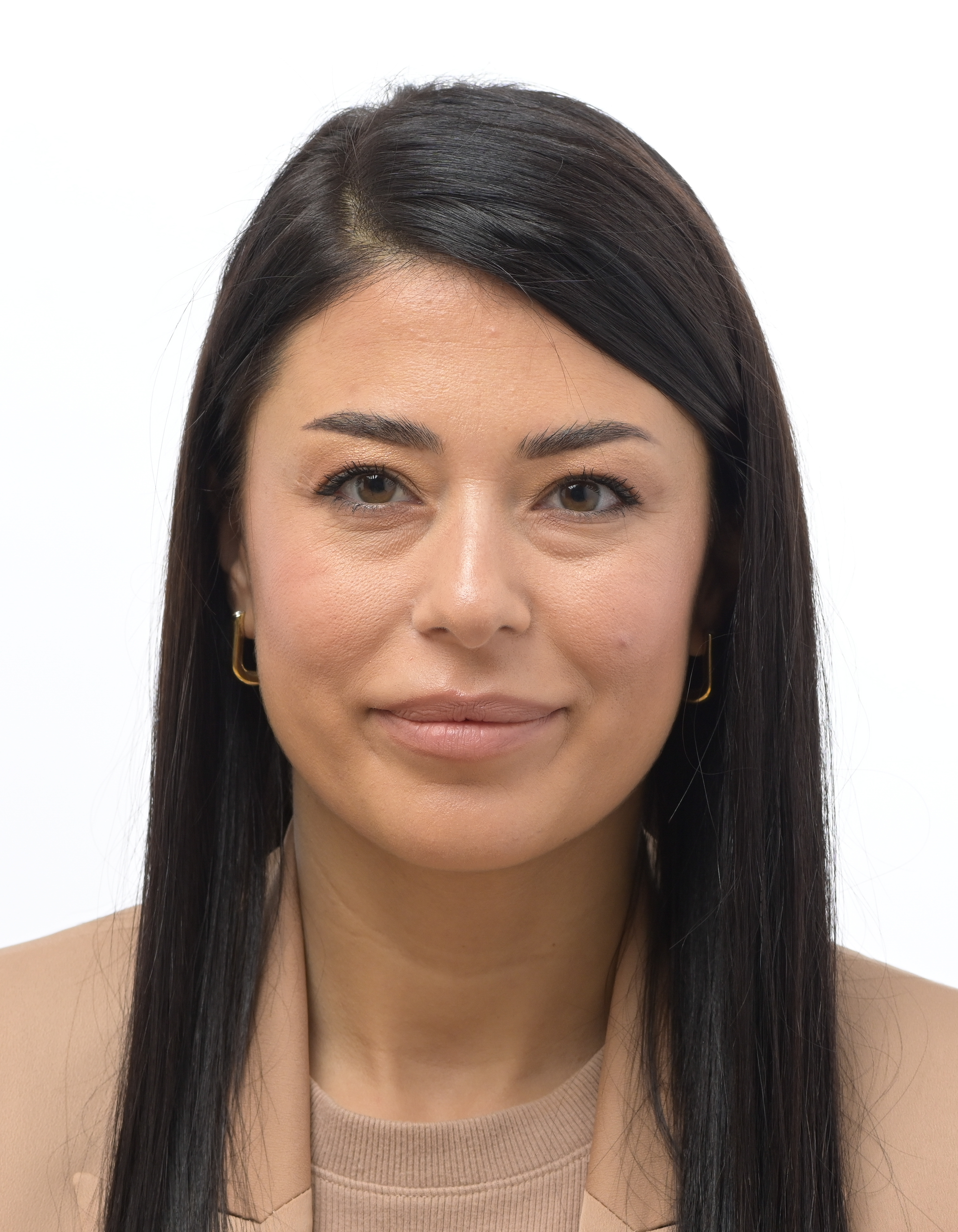
	First party	Second party	Third party
Leader	Kyriakos Mitsotakis	Stefanos Kasselakis	Nikos Androulakis
Party	ND	Syriza	PASOK–KINAL
Alliance	EPP	The Left	S&D
Last election	33.12%, 8 seats	23.75%, 6 seats	7,72%, 2 seats
Seats won	7	4	3
Seat change	▼1	▼2	▲1
Popular vote	1,125,602	593,133	508,399
Percentage	28.31%	14.92%	12.79%
Swing	▼4.81%	▼8.83%	▲5.07%
	Fourth party	Fifth party	Sixth party
Leader	Kyriakos Velopoulos	Dimitris Koutsoumpas	Dimitris Natsios
Party	EL	KKE	NIKI
Alliance	ECR	ECA–NI	NI
Last election	4,18%, 1 seat	5,35%, 2 seats	New
Seats won	2	2	1
Seat change	▲1	Steady	New
Popular vote	369,727	367,796	173,574
Percentage	9.30%	9.25%	4.37%
Swing	▲5.12%	▲3.9%	New
	Seventh party	Eighth party
Leader	Zoe Konstantopoulou	Afroditi Latinopoulou
Party	PE	FL
Alliance	NI	Patriots
Last election	1,61%, 0 seats	New
Seats won	1	1
Seat change	▲1	New
Popular vote	135,310	120,753
Percentage	3.4%	3.04%
Swing	▲1.81%	New
- Results by district

The 2024 European Parliament election in Greece was held on 9 June 2024 as part of the 2024 European Parliament election. This was the first to take place after Brexit.

The governing New Democracy came first, but ceded ground in terms of both popular vote and seats secured. The centre-left SYRIZA and PASOK came in second and third, respectively: SYRIZA lost two seats, while PASOK gained one. Overall, those left-wing parties to earn representation won 10 seats and 40.36% of the vote; right-wing ones won 11 seats and 45.02% of the vote.

== Background ==
Greece will elect 21 Members of the European Parliament.

The Spartans party was barred from participating in the 2024 european parliament elections an action that was endorsed by New Democracy, PASOK, New left and Syriza while it was rejected by Afroditi Latinopoulou and her Voice of Reason party.

== Parties participating ==
The parties and party coalitions participating in the election (in alphabetical order):

1. Antarsya
2. Assembly of Greeks
3. Communist Party of Greece
4. Conservatives
5. Course of Freedom
6. Democrats
7. Diaspora Network of Greeks in Europe
8. Greek Solution
9. Green Movement
10. I PARTICIPATE for National Sovereignty and for Cyprus
11. Kosmos
12. Marxist–Leninist Communist Party of Greece
13. MeRA25
14. Movement 21
15. National Front
16. National Independence Movement
17. New Democracy
18. New Left
19. NIKI
20. OAKKE
21. OKDE
22. Party of Friendship, Equality and Peace
23. Party of Greek Hunters - AKKEL - TOGETHER for a Free Greece
24. Popular Orthodox Rally
25. PASOK – Movement for Change
26. Patriots
27. Recreation
28. Syriza
29. Union of Centrists
30. United Popular Front
31. Voice of Reason

=== Slogans ===
Party or alliance	Original slogan	English translation
ND	«Σταθερά πιο κοντά στην Ευρώπη»	"Steadily closer to Europe"
SYRIZA	«Καλύτερη ζωή τώρα»	"Better life now"
PASOK-KINAL	«Μπορούμε και αξίζουμε περισσότερα στην Ελλάδα και την Ευρώπη»	"We can and deserve more in Greece and Europe"
KKE	«Με ΚΚΕ πολύ πιο δυνατό για πανευρωπαϊκή αντεπίθεση»	"With a much stronger KKE for a pan-European counter-attack"
EL	«Πρώτα η Ελλάδα! Πρώτα οι Έλληνες!»	"Greece first! Greeks first!"
MeRA25	«Ενόχλησέ τους!»	"Bother them!"
PE	«Θέλεις Ζωή και στην Ευρωβουλή;»	"Do you want Life (Zoe) in the European Parliament as well?"
NA	«Δώσε φωνή στο δίκιο σου»	"Give voice to your right"
NIKI	«Διεκδικούμε την Ελλάδα που μας αξίζει στην Ευρώπη που θέλουμε»	"We claim the Greece we deserve in the Europe we want"
FL	«Στις ευρωεκλογές στείλε μήνυμα»	"In the European elections send a message"
DIMO	«Η ώρα της κοινής λογικής»	"The time of common sense"
KOS	«Γιατί η ζωή μας έχει σημασία»	"Because our life matters"

== Controversies ==
At the beginning of March 2024, Greeks living abroad received a promotional email from MEP and New Democracy candidate Anna-Michelle Assimakopoulou, which triggered a wave of criticism that the law on the protection of personal data had been violated and that data on postal voters had been illegally passed on by the Ministry of the Interior.

== Opinion polling ==
Polling firm/Commissioner	Fieldwork date	Sample size	ND EPP	SYRIZA Left	PASOK S&D	KKE NI	XA (Note: De facto banned, popular former XA member Ilias Kasidiaris supported Spartans for the 2023 Greek legislative election.) NI	EL ECR	MeRA25 Left	PE NI	R NI	Antarsya NI	SP NI	NIKI NI	FL PfE	NA Left	DIMO Renew	KOS G/EFA	PAT NI	Other	Lead
2024 EP election	9 Jun 2024	–	28.3	14.9	12.8	9.3	–	9.3	2.5	3.4	0.4	0,5	–	4.4	3.0	2.5	1.5	1.1	1.4	4.7	13.4
GPO/Parapolitika	4–7 Jun 2024	1,200	32.3	16.1	12.9	8.5	–	8.8	2.4	3.7	–	–	–	3.9	2.9	2.7	2.2	–	–	3.1	16.2
Pulse RC/Skai	4–6 Jun 2024	1,169	31.3	16.2	12.8	7.8	–	8.4	3.3	3.3	–	1.0	–	3.3	2.7	3.3	1.5	1.0	1.4	2.7	15.1
MRB/Open	4–6 Jun 2024	1,212	31.5	16.0	12.5	8.0	–	8.5	3.0	3.5	–	–	–	4.0	2.8	3.1	2.0	–	–	–	15.5
Interview/Political	30 May–6 Jun 2024	2,755	30.0	17.2	11.4	7.2	–	8.1	2.4	2.8	1.1	–	–	–	–	–	–	–	–	–	12.8
Marc/AΝΤ1	3–5 Jun 2024	1,205	33.0	16.6	11.7	7.8	–	8.4	2.8	4.3	–	–	–	–	–	–	–	–	–	–	16.4
Good Affairs/To Vima	2–5 Jun 2024	2,048	32.1	16.7	12.1	8.1	–	8.0	2.5	2.8	–	–	–	–	–	–	–	–	–	–	15.4
Metron Analysis/Mega	28 May–5 Jun 2024	1,606	32.0	15.5	12.0	7.5	–	8.5	3.0	4.5	–	–	–	–	–	–	–	–	–	–	16.5
Alco/Alpha	2–4 Jun 2024	1,000	31.1	15.2	12.7	8.0	–	8.6	3.5	3.1	–	–	–	–	–	–	–	–	–	–	15.9
Prorata/Attica	29 May–4 Jun 2024	1,000	32.4	13.7	13.2	9.3	–	9.3	2.8	4.4	–	–	–	–	–	–	–	–	–	–	18.7
Interview/Politic	30 May–3 Jun 2024	2,005	33.8	16.7	11.1	7.8	–	7.8	4.4	2.8	–	–	–	–	–	–	–	–	–	–	17.1
Opinion Poll/Action24	29 May–1 Jun 2024	1,201	33.0	16.2	12.3	8.0	–	9.0	2.6	3.7	–	–	–	–	–	–	–	–	–	–	16.8
Marc/Proto Thema	29–31 May 2024	1,003	34.5	16.7	11.9	7.3	–	8.4	2.7	4.2	–	–	–	–	–	–	–	–	–	–	17.8
Pulse RC/Skai	27–30 May 2024	1,203	32.0	16.5	13.0	7.5	–	8.5	3.5	3.5	–	–	–	–	–	–	–	–	–	–	15.5
MARC/ANT1	27–30 May 2024	1,207	33.4	16.5	11.8	7.6	–	8.8	3.0	4.6	–	–	–	–	–	–	–	–	–	–	16.9
GPO/Star	27–29 May 2024	1,200	33.1	16.2	13.2	8.2	–	8.4	2.0	3.5	–	–	–	–	–	–	–	–	–	–	16.9
Prorata/Attica	22–28 May 2024	1,000	33.3	12.0	13.0	11.2	–	8.5	1.7	3.9	–	–	–	–	–	–	–	–	–	–	20.3
Metron Analysis/Mega	20–24 May 2024	1,311	31.0	15.7	12.9	7.9	–	7.3	3.3	4.2	–	–	–	–	–	–	–	–	–	–	15.3
Good Affairs/Dailypost	18–25 May 2024	1,000	31.1	16.3	11.1	7.8	–	8.1	1.6	3.0	–	–	–	–	–	–	–	–	–	–	14.8
Opinion Poll/Action24	15–16 May 2024	1,006	33.3	15.5	12.1	8.3	–	9.9	2.3	3.8	–	–	–	–	–	–	–	–	–	–	17.8
GPO/Parapolitika	13–16 May 2024	1,200	33.3	15.6	13.2	8.6	–	8.6	2.2	3.2	–	–	–	–	–	–	–	–	–	–	17.7
Alco/Alpha	13–15 May 2024	1,000	32.5	16.0	13.0	9.0	–	10.0	2.2	3.3	–	–	–	3.5	2.4	2.9	2.5	–	–	3.0	16.5
Pulse RC/Skai	13–15 May 2024	1,104	33.0	16.0	12.5	8.0	–	9.0	3.0	3.5	–	–	–	3.5	2.4	3.0	2.1	–	1.2	2.8	17.0
MARC/ANT1	10–15 May 2024	1,209	33.8	15.2	12.2	8.0	–	8.3	3.0	4.5	–	–	–	3.2	2.8	3.0	2.5	–	–	3.3	18.6
MRB/Open	10–14 May 2024	1,100	32.3	16.0	14.0	8.0	–	9.9	2.2	3.4	–	–	–	2.9	2.8	3.8	2.4	–	–	2.2	16.3
Interview/Politic	8–13 May 2024	2,405	33.3	17.2	12.2	6.7	–	7.8	2.6	2.7	1.6	–	–	3.4	2.7	5.0	2.6	–	–	11.8	16.1
Good Affairs/To Vima	7–9 May 2024	3,060	31.8	16.1	11.8	8.3	–	10.3	2.3	3.1	–	–	–	4.2	2.1	2.8	2.6	1.1	–	3.5	15.7
Marc/Proto Thema	18–25 Apr 2024	1,049	33.4	14.7	11.4	8.5	–	9.8	2.4	5.4	–	–	2.4	3.4	2.2	2.5	1.7	–	–	2.2	18.7
GPO/Parapolitika	17–22 Apr 2024	1,400	33.6	16.3	13.5	8.8	–	9.1	2.1	3.1	–	–	2.4	3.4	–	2.7	2.2	–	–	2.8	17.3
Metron Analysis/Mega	10–16 Apr 2024	1,304	32.3	15.4	12.0	9.8	–	8.3	1.6	4.2	–	–	2.5	3.6	1.4	3.1	2.0	1.0	–	2.8	16.9
Prorata/Attica	5–10 Apr 2024	1,000	29.5	15.0	12.7	9.2	–	9.8	2.3	4.6	–	–	1.7	3.5	1.7	4.0	1.7	1.2	–	3.0	14.5
Opinion Poll/Action 24	8–10 Apr 2024	1,006	32.1	15.0	12.4	8.5	–	10.7	1.3	3.7	–	–	2.6	3.7	1.4	3.2	3.0	–	–	2.3	17.1
Interview/Politic	4–8 Apr 2024	2,355	27.7	16.1	12.7	6.9	–	11.8	2.4	2.8	1.7	–	1.2	4.3	2.3	4.7	2.2	–	–	3.2	11.6
Alco/Alpha	2–5 Apr 2024	1,000	29.9	14.3	13.3	9.4	–	9.6	2.3	4.1	–	–	2.7	4.2	1.4	3.0	2.2	–	–	3.5	15.6
Palmos Analysis/Eleftheros Typos	1–4 Apr 2024	1,008	31.8	14.1	13.0	9.4	–	10.3	–	4.2	–	–	3.3	3.5	–	4.0	–	–	–	6.6	17.7
GPO/Parapolitika	1–3 Apr 2024	1,000	33.4	15.9	14.2	9.0	–	9.5	1.8	3.0	–	–	2.2	3.3	–	2.2	2.2	–	–	3.3	17.5
MRB/Open	1–3 Apr 2024	1,000	31.5	15.9	13.4	8.1	–	9.9	1.9	4.3	–	–	2.1	3.6	1.8	3.8	1.6	–	–	2.3	15.6
Pulse RC/Skai	1–3 Apr 2024	1,105	33.0	15.0	12.5	8.5	–	9.0	2.5	3.5	–	–	3.0	3.5	1.8	3.0	1.8	–	–	2.9	18.0
Opinion Poll/Action24	15–20 Mar 2024	1,010	34.4	13.4	12.5	9.4	–	10.1	1.9	2.9	–	–	2.5	4.3	–	2.9	2.8	–	–	2.8	21.0
Metron Analysis/Mega	12–19 Mar 2024	1,317	31.4	15.1	13.0	10.1	–	9.7	1.9	4.3	–	0.6	2.0	3.2	2.4	3.0	1.0	0.6	–	1.7	16.3
Good Affairs/To Vima	12–14 Mar 2024	3,229	30.8	13.1	12.9	8.2	–	9.8	2.2	2.1	–	–	2.2	3.6	–	2.5	2.9	–	–	1.5	17.7
Marc/Proto Thema	11–14 Mar 2024	1,086	36.2	13.4	12.6	9.4	–	9.2	2.4	3.1	–	–	2.6	2.8	–	2.6	2.1	–	–	3.7	22.8
GPO/Star	11–13 Mar 2024	1,200	34.8	14.3	13.9	9.5	–	8.0	2.3	2.9	–	–	1.8	3.4	–	3.0	2.6	–	–	3.5	20.5
Interview/Politic	7–11 Mar 2024	2,250	29.1	14.4	12.4	7.1	–	12.0	–	2.5	–	–	1.8	4.6	–	4.9	–	–	–	11.3	14.7
Alco/Alpha	1–6 Mar 2024	1,000	32.8	12.7	14.1	10.8	–	7.9	2.8	3.6	–	–	2.9	4.5	–	3.4	–	–	–	4.0	18.7
Ipsos/Euronews	23 Feb–5 Mar 2024	1,000	35.0	13.6	13.4	9.0	–	8.7	<3.0	3.2	–	–	2.9	4.0	–	3.3	–	–	–	3.9	21.4
Pulse RC/Skai	27 Feb–1 Mar 2024	1,106	35.5	14.0	14.0	9.0	–	8.5	2.5	3.0	–	–	3.0	4.0	–	3.0	–	–	–	3.5	21.5
GPO/Parapolitika	26–29 Feb 2024	1,000	36.4	13.5	14.4	10.7	–	8.2	2.4	2.7	–	–	2.2	3.4	–	2.9	–	–	–	3.2	22.0
Opinion Poll/Action24	21–27 Feb 2024	1,504	33.9	11.9	13.9	10.1	–	10.2	2.6	3.5	–	–	2.7	4.2	–	3.3	–	–	–	3.7	20.0
Opinion Poll/Action24	13–16 Feb 2024	1,004	34.3	12.5	14.6	9.4	–	9.5	2.4	3.7	–	–	2.7	3.8	–	3.3	–	–	–	3.8	19.7
Interview/Politic	6–12 Feb 2024	2,155	33.3	14.2	12.8	8.3	–	9.1	–	2.6	–	–	2.1	5.1	–	5.1	–	–	–	9.7	19.1
Alco/Alpha	1–7 Feb 2024	1,201	34.5	12.6	15.0	11.2	–	7.5	2.2	3.1	–	–	2.8	3.9	–	2.6	–	–	–	4.3	19.5
GPO/Star	20–25 Jan 2024	1,100	38.8	14.0	14.2	9.6	–	7.2	2.7	2.6	–	–	2.2	3.3	–	3.0	–	–	–	2.4	24.6
MRB/Open	22–24 Jan 2024	1,000	36.1	12.1	12.1	9.3	–	9.5	2.8	4.0	–	–	2.8	3.7	–	2.7	–	–	–	4.8	24.0
Marc/Ant1	17–23 Jan 2024	1,092	37.1	12.6	16.8	9.4	–	7.0	2.9	3.0	–	–	3.1	3.1	–	2.4	–	–	–	2.6	20.3
Interview/Politic	10–15 Jan 2024	2,388	31.5	14.1	14.2	10.8	–	8.0	–	2.3	–	–	2.6	5.2	–	4.1	–	–	–	7.2	17.3
Prorata/Attica	5–9 Jan 2024	1,000	36.6	12.8	15.9	11.0	–	6.1	1.8	3.0	–	–	3.7	3.7	–	3.7	–	–	–	1.8	20.7
Alco/Alpha	2–5 Jan 2024	1,002	35.3	13.8	14.3	11.3	–	6.9	2.4	3.3	–	–	3.2	3.3	–	2.7	–	–	–	3.6	21.0
Interview/Politic	4–8 Dec 2023	2,356	34.0	16.1	14.4	7.9	–	7.6	–	3.0	–	–	2.3	3.8	–	2.9	–	–	–	7.9	17.9
GPO/Parapolitika	5–7 Dec 2023	1,000	41.7	12.1	13.5	10.3	–	6.6	1.9	2.1	–	–	3.4	2.4	–	3.7	–	–	–	2.3	28.3
2019 election	26 May 2019	–	33.1	23.8	7.7	5.4	4.9	4.2	3.0 (Note: 49 votes below the 3% threshold.)	1.6	0.7	0.4	1.5 (Note: Alongside Union of Centrists.)	–	–	–	–	–	–	13.7	9.3

== Results ==
ND's, SYRIZA's and PASOK's results by constituency

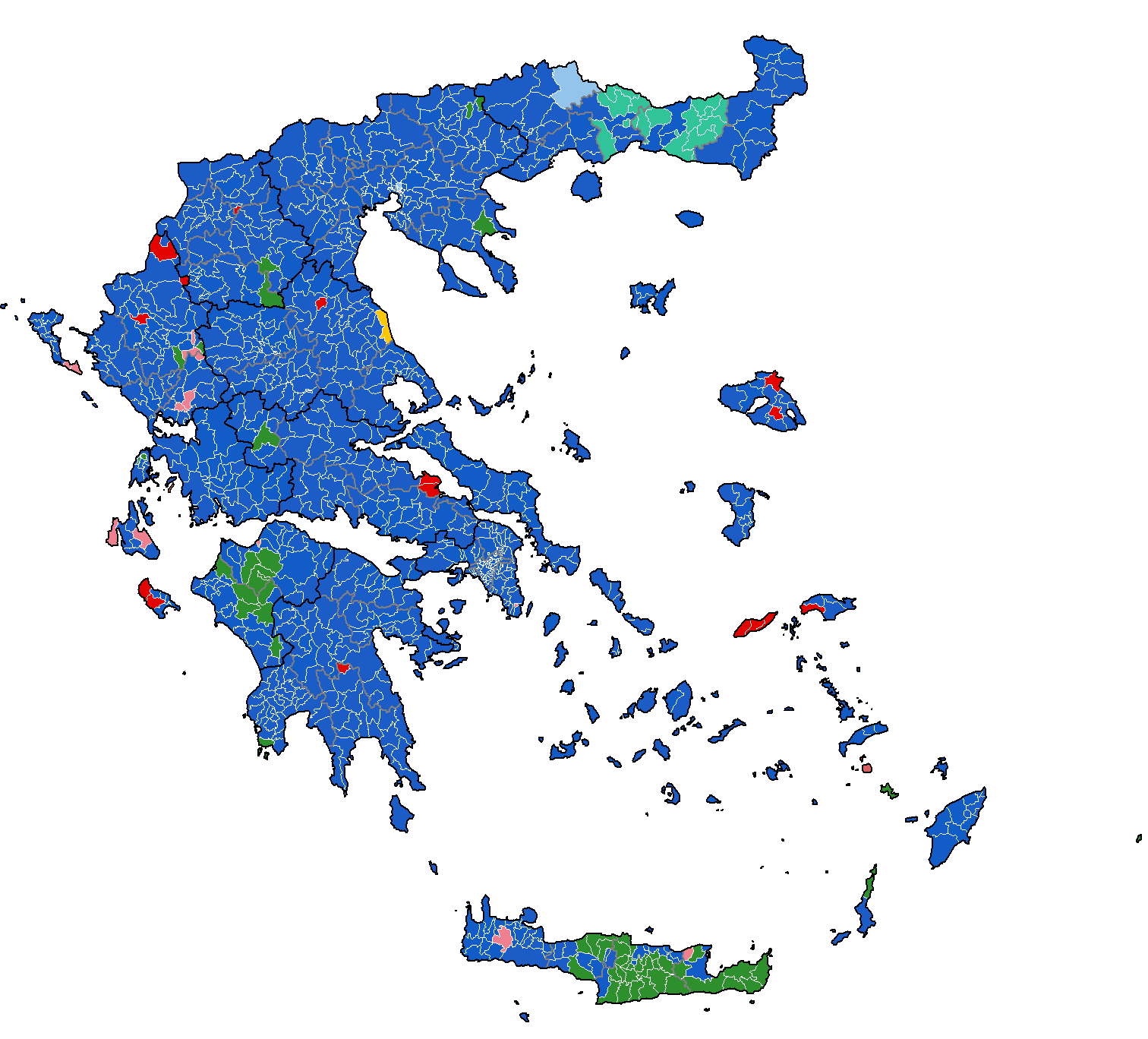
Results, showing the winning party in each municipal unit. ND (916) PASOK (55) KKE (16) KIEF (15) SYRIZA (14) EL (5) MeRA25 (1) NA (1) PK (1)

Party	Votes	%	Seats	+/–
New Democracy	1,125,602	28.31	7	–1
Syriza – Progressive Alliance	593,133	14.92	4	–2
PASOK – Movement for Change	508,399	12.79	3	+1
Greek Solution	369,727	9.30	2	+1
Communist Party of Greece	367,796	9.25	2	0
Victory – Democratic Patriotic Movement	173,574	4.37	1	New
Course of Freedom	135,310	3.40	1	+1
Voice of Reason	120,753	3.04	1	New
MeRA25	101,127	2.54	0	0
New Left	97,554	2.45	0	New
Democrats	57,496	1.45	0	New
Patriots – Prodromos Emfietzoglou	56,100	1.41	0	New
Kosmos	42,762	1.08	0	New
I PARTICIPATE for National Sovereignty and Cyprus	30,600	0.77	0	New
Party of Friendship, Equality and Peace	28,470	0.72	0	0
Green Movement	26,555	0.67	0	New
Together for a Free Greece (KEKA – AKKEL)	20,816	0.52	0	0
Antarsya – Anti-Capitalist Cooperation	20,603	0.52	0	0
Creation	14,024	0.35	0	0
United Popular Front	13,816	0.35	0	0
Movement 21	12,449	0.31	0	New
Union of Centrists	10,933	0.27	0	0
Conservatives	10,146	0.26	0	New
Popular Orthodox Rally	9,936	0.25	0	0
National Front	7,572	0.19	0	0
Assembly of Greeks	6,980	0.18	0	0
Marxist–Leninist Communist Party of Greece	6,836	0.17	0	0
National Independence Movement	2,465	0.06	0	New
Organisation of Internationalist Communists of Greece	1,973	0.05	0	0
Organization for the Reconstruction of the KKE	1,615	0.04	0	0
Diaspora Network of European Greeks	963	0.02	0	New
Total	3,976,085	100.00	21	0
Valid votes	3,976,085	97.88		
Invalid votes	55,293	1.36		
Blank votes	30,714	0.76		
Total votes	4,062,092	100.00		
Registered voters/turnout	9,814,685	41.39		
Source: Ministry Of The Interior

=== Largest and smallest percentages for each elected party ===
Results, showing the winning party in each precinct. ND (5311) PASOK (943) SYRIZA (328) KKE (267) EL (170) KIEF (137) Niki (16) PE (8) NA (7) FL (6) MeRA25 (2) Dimokrates (2) Patriotes (2) Kosmos (2) PK (2) KEKA–AKKEL (1) ANTARSYA (1) EK (1) Syntiritikoi (1)

Party	Largest	%	Smallest	%
New Democracy	Laconia	35,62	Rhodope	19,61
Syriza – Proggresive Alliance	Arta	22,66	Rhodope	7,14
Pasok – Movement for Change	Lasithi	29,37	Piraeus A	7,86
Greek Solution	Imathia	18,42	Leukada	5,09
Communist Party of Greece	Samos	20,95	Rhodope	3,87
Democratic Patriotic Movement 'Niki'	Pieria	10,45	Leukada	2,05
Course of Freedom	Piraeus B	4,56	Rhodope	1,22
Voice of Reason	Evros	6,36	Lasithi	1,59

== Elected MEPs ==
Source: Current Member of the European Parliament - Greece's 21 members

=== New Democracy ===
• Aftias Georgios (320,176 votes)

• Meimarakis Vangelis (268,952)

• Vozemberg Εliza (254,493)

• Beleris Fredi (245,874)

• Meleti Eleonora (178,990)

• Manolis Kefalogiannis (168,329)

• Tsiodras Dimitrios (162,541)

=== Syriza ===
• Arvanitis Konstantinos (159,786 votes)

• Farantouris Nikolas (141,216)

• Pappas Nikolaos (132,024)

• Kountoura Elena (118,689)

=== PASOK – Movement for Change ===
• Papandreou Nikolaos (127,633 votes)

• Maniatis Ioannis (111,511)

• Arnaoutoglou Sakis (94,992)

=== Greek Solution ===
• Fragkos Emmanouil (114,244 votes)

• Alexandraki Galato (53,045)

=== KKE ===
• Papadakis Konstantinos (112,406 votes)

• Nikolaou-Alavanos Lefteris (110,461)

=== NIKI ===
• Anadiotis Nikolaos (43,369 votes)

=== Course of Freedom ===
• Zacharia Maria (23,946 votes)

=== Voice of Reason ===
• Latinopoulou Afroditi (60,745 votes)

== Aftermath ==
=== New Democracy ===
Falling well short of its showing in the final polls (which projected New Democracy to win a third of the vote), just as it has in the 2019 European parliament election, Kyriakos Mitsotakis acknowledged the "message understood,” and pledged to move Greece closer to the EU.

=== SYRIZA ===
Suffering a nearly 40% decline in its vote share from the 2019 elections, many considered the outcome to be a defeat for Syriza and its new leader, Stefanos Kasselakis. The party failed to win in any region of the country, including Chania, home to Kasselakis.

=== PASOK-KINAL ===
The alliance improved from its showing in the 2019 EU election, but remained stagnant from legislative elections and failed to fulfill its goal of reasserting itself as the official opposition. This triggered a crisis within the party, with the credibility of Nikos Androulakis’ leadership being called into question. Some in the party also floated the possibility of an alliance with Syriza in advance of the 2027 legislative elections, including Syriza MP Nikos Pappas and Athens’ PASOK mayor Haris Doukas.

=== Right-wing parties ===
Greece, unlike Northern Europe, was not an exception to the right-wing surge. Most significantly, Greek Solution’s support increased to 9.3%. NIKI entered Greece’s EU delegation with 4.4% of the vote, while right-wing Voice of Reason managed to elect its leader (Afroditi Latinopoulou) as an MEP with 3.0%. Altogether, parties widely considered to be positioned on the far right (including minor contestants, such as Patriots and Creation) took nearly 20% of the vote share.

=== KKE ===
Despite slipping to fifth place, being surpassed by Greek Solution, KKE managed to nearly double its vote share, from 5.3% in the 2019 election to 9.2%. The party retained its third position in the region of Attica.

=== Other parties ===
The New Left party's leader, Alexis Haritsis, admitted to their failure to retain either of their two MEPs, unlike Mera25 leader Giannis Varoufakis who said that they may have failed to reach the 3% mark but slightly improved their percentages in contrast to last year; saying on left-wing collectivised newspaper Efsyn that they were the sole carrier of "the subversive, ecological left".
