= National Front (Greece) =

National Front Εθνικό Μέτωπο Ethniko Metopo
- Leader: Manos Konstas
- Founder: Manos Konstas
- Founded: 2012
- Split from: National Political Union
- Headquarters: Arkadias 31, Athens, Greece
- Ideology: Ultranationalism
- Political position: Far-right

Party flag

Website
- ethnikometopo.gr

The National Front (Greek: Εθνικό Mέτωπο, romanized: Ethniko Metopo) is a far-right Greek nationalist political party. It has been active since 2012. It is led by Manos Konstas.

== Election results ==
=== Hellenic Parliament ===
Election	Hellenic Parliament					Rank	Government	Leader
Election	Votes	%	±pp	Seats won	+/−	Rank	Government	Leader
Jun 2023	2,965	0.06%	New	0 / 300	New	22nd	Extra-parliamentary	Manos Konstas

=== European Parliament ===
European Parliament
Election	Votes	%	±pp	Seats won	+/−	Rank	Leader	EP Group
2014	8,783	0.15	New	0 / 21	New	30th	Manos Konstas	−
2019	10,742	0.19	+0.04	0 / 21	0	31st	Manos Konstas	−
2024	7,572	0.19	±0.00	0 / 21	0	25th	Manos Konstas	−
