= United Popular Front =

Political party in Greece

United Popular Front (EPAM) Ενιαίο Παλλαϊκό Μέτωπο (ΕΠΑΜ)
- President: Dimitris Kazakis
- Founder: Dimitris Kazakis
- Founded: 16 July 2011
- Ideology: Economic nationalism Sovereigntism; Euroscepticism
- Political position: Big tent

Website
- epamhellas.gr

United Popular Front (Greek: Ενιαίο Παλλαϊκό Μέτωπο (ΕΠΑΜ), EPAM) is a Greek political party founded in July 2011 by citizens who participated in the Indignant Citizens Movement and the anti-austerity demonstrations which accompanied the Great Recession (2007 – 2009) hitting especially hard on Greece as one of the first countries affected. E.PA.M. participated in the legislative elections of May 2012 as party of the coalition of "NO" with the Democratic Revival and gained 0.9%. Having started as a citizens movement in July 2011, the founding congress of the party was held on April 8, 2012 and decided the founding declaration and the participation in the parliamentary elections of May 2012.

== History ==
E.PA.M (United Popular Front - Alternate Translation: United People's Front) began as a political citizen movement which was announced as a political citizen organization on July 16, 2011. It was set up to offer a political home το those citizens who disagreed with the positions of the traditional Greek parties and to a great majority had no former active political experience. The creators of the movement were the people themselves with their leading figure being Dimitris Kazakis coming from the Greek traditional political Left.

EPAM (Unified Popular Front in English) aims to help re-establish Greece's sovereignty as an independent state and responsible member of the community of nations. The establishment of EPAM resulted from the demonstrations in gatherings lasting more than a month in the public squares of virtually all the cities and towns of Greece, first and foremost in Syntagma Square in Athens.

EPAM was and is determined to make a decisive contribution to uniting Greeks, above and beyond party lines and ideological and other divisions by creating a nationwide social and political movement representing the entire people of Greece.

On March 27, 2012, it acquired official political party status after the first conference in April 2012, where the members voted the party's constitution and elected a 51-member National Council. In the beginning of June 2013, the second conference took place, where its institutional positions where reconfirmed, strategies and tactics based on the latest political status of the country were decided and a new National Council was elected.

== Election results ==
=== Hellenic Parliament ===
Election	Hellenic Parliament					Rank	Government	Leader
Election	Votes	%	±pp	Seats won	+/−	Rank	Government	Leader
May 2012	58,190^{1}	0.92%	New	0 / 300	Steady	#15	Extra-parliamentary	Dimitris Kazakis
Jun 2012	Did not contest			0 / 300	Steady	N/A	Extra-parliamentary	Dimitris Kazakis
Jan 2015	Did not contest			0 / 300	Steady	N/A	Extra-parliamentary	Dimitris Kazakis
Sep 2015	41,631	0.77%	▼0.15	0 / 300	Steady	#11	Extra-parliamentary	Dimitris Kazakis
2019	28,313	0.50% (With Agricultural Livestock Party)	▼0.27	0 / 300	Steady	#11	Extra-parliamentary	Dimitris Kazakis
May 2023	With Alliance of Subversion			0 / 300	Steady	#9	Extra-parliamentary	Dimitris Kazakis

^{1} In coalition named "NO" with Democratic Revival.

=== European Parliament ===
European Parliament
Election	Votes	%	±pp	Seats won	+/−	Rank	Leader	EP Group
2014	49,386	0.86%	New	0 / 21	New	15th	Dimitris Kazakis	−
2019	Did not contest			0 / 21	0	—	Dimitris Kazakis	−
2024	13,816	0.35%	-0.51	0 / 21	0	21st	Dimitris Kazakis	−
