= Party of Greek Hunters-Fishermen =

Party of Greek Hunters-Fishermen Κόμμα Ελλήνων Κυνηγών - Αλιέων
- Abbreviation: KEKA
- Leader: Michalis Zougris
- Founder: Giorgos Tsagkanelias
- Founded: 6 March 1990
- Ideology: Social conservatism
- Political position: Centre-right

Website
- keka.gr (archived)

The Party of Greek Hunters-Fishermen (Greek: Κόμμα Ελλήνων Κυνηγών, KEKA), is a minor Greek political party that advocates the rights of hunters. It was founded under the name Party of Greek Hunters (Greek: Κόμμα Ελλήνων Κυνηγών - Αλιέων, KEK) and led by Giorgos Tsagkanelias, who died in 2021.

Party logo until 2021

In 2021, after Tsagkanelias's death, the party was renamed to the Party of Greek Hunters-Fishermen, and Michalis Zougris was elected as its new president.

== Election results ==
Results, 1990–2014 (year links to election page)
Year	Type of Election	Votes	%	Mandates
1990	Parliament	5,060	0.1	0
1993	Parliament	3,614	0.05	0
1996	Parliament	17,419	0.26	0

=== European Parliament ===
European Parliament
Election	Votes	%	±pp	Seats won	+/−	Rank	Leader	EP Group
1994	41,157	0.63%	New	0 / 21	New	10th	George Tsaganelias	−
1999	64,194	1.00%	+0.37	0 / 21	0	8th	George Tsaganelias	−
2004	Did not contest			0 / 21	0	—N/a	George Tsaganelias	−
2009	64,824	1.26%	+0.26	0 / 21	0	8th	George Tsaganelias	−
2014	56,851	0.99%	−0.27	0 / 21	0	12th	George Tsaganelias	−
2019	Did not contest			0 / 21	0	—N/a	George Tsaganelias	−
2024 (Note: Run as part of the Together for a Free Greece coalition.)	20,816	0.52%	−0.47	0 / 21	0	17th	Michalis Zougris	−
