= Agricultural Livestock Party of Greece =

Agricultural Livestock Party of Greece Αγροτικό Κτηνοτροφικό Κόμμα Ελλάδας
- Abbreviation: AKKEL
- Leader: Vakis Tsiombanidis
- Founder: Vakis Tsiombanidis
- Founded: May 2014
- Headquarters: Sakkos, Orestiada
- Youth wing: AKKEL Youth
- Ideology: Agrarianism; Agrarian reform Euroscepticism; Russophilia
- Political position: Right-wing; Big tent
- National affiliation: National Alliance
- European affiliation: ESN (Sofia Declaration); EAFD (2020–2023); 5SDD (2019)
- Colours: Purple; Blue
- Parliament: 0 / 300
- European Parliament: 0 / 21

Website
- akkelparty.blogspot.com

The Agricultural Livestock Party of Greece (Greek: Αγροτικό Κτηνοτροφικό Κόμμα Ελλάδας; AKKEL) is a Greek political party founded in May 2014 with Evangelos (Vakis) Tsiombanidis as president. The headquarters of the Party is located in Sakkos, Orestiada.

== History ==
AKKEL participated independently in the 2014 European election, where it received 0.57% (32,366) votes. In the national elections of January 2015, it participated as a coalition of parties with the Independent Greeks, the Christian Democratic Party of the Overthrow, the Fiery Greece and the LEYKO, an alliance that was not repeated in the early parliamentary elections of the same year. In February 2019, AKKEL participated in an event together with the Italian party 5 Star Movement, the Croatian Human Shield, the Polish Kukiz'15 and the Finnish Movement Now with the aim of creating a pan-European electoral alliance for the May 2019 European elections. In the national elections of July 7, 2019, AKKEL collaborated with EPAM where the alliance received 0.50% of the vote. Since 2020, it works with other political organizations in the coalition Unity Initiative.

== Ideology ==
The purpose of the party is to represent the farmers and the people of the primary sector in Greece in general. AKKEL's basic ideology according to the party's statute is the development of the country through primary production and it has raised several issues concerning Greek farmers in the European Union. The party refuses to be placed in the left–right political spectrum, considering it obsolete and divisive, while identifying itself as a unifying party.

== Electoral results ==
=== Hellenic Parliament ===
Year	Leader	Votes	%	Seats	Place
2015 Ι	Vakis Tsiombanidis	293.201 (Independent Greeks)	4,75% (Independent Greeks)	0 / 300	7th place
2015 ΙΙ	Vakis Tsiombanidis	did not participate			
2019	Vakis Tsiombanidis	28.313 (with EPAM)	0,50% (with EPAM)	0 / 300	11th place

=== European Parliament ===
European Parliament
Election	Votes	%	±pp	Seats won	+/−	Rank	Leader	EP Group
2014	32,356	0.57%	New	0 / 21	New	21st	Vakis Tsiombanidis	−
2019	32,014	0.57%	±0.00	0 / 21	0	21st	Vakis Tsiombanidis	−
2024 (Note: Run as part of the Together for a Free Greece coalition.)	20,816	0.52%	−0.05	0 / 21	0	17th	Vakis Tsiombanidis	−
