= Greek Solution =

Political party in Greece

Greek Solution Ελληνική Λύση Ellinikí Lýsi
- President: Kyriakos Velopoulos
- Vice President: Dimitra Kritikou
- Press Secretary: Giannis Skalkos
- Founder: Kyriakos Velopoulos
- Founded: 28 June 2016
- Headquarters: Ippokratous 10-12, Athens
- Youth wing: Greek Solution Youth
- Ideology: Ultranationalism; National conservatism; Right-wing populism; Euroscepticism
- Political position: Right-wing to far-right
- Religion: Church of Greece
- European affiliation: None
- European Parliament group: European Conservatives and Reformists Group
- Colours: Light blue
- Parliament: 11 / 300
- European Parliament: 2 / 21

Website
- elliniki-lisi.gr

The Greek Solution (Greek: Ελληνική Λύση, romanized: Ellinikí Lýsi) is a political party in Greece founded by Kyriakos Velopoulos. The party is right-wing to far-right and is ideologically ultranationalist, national conservative, and right-wing populist. The party first entered the European Parliament when it got 4.18% of the vote in the 2019 European Parliament election in Greece, winning one seat and the Hellenic Parliament when it garnered 3.7% of the vote in the 2019 Greek legislative election and won 10 seats.

== History ==
The party was officially founded in June 2016 by journalist and historian Kyriakos Velopoulos, formerly a Popular Orthodox Rally (LAOS) member. It had previously been announced that a new party was to be founded by him. A formal presentation of the new party took place in October 2016 at an event in the Peace and Friendship Stadium.

In the 2019 European Parliament election, the party won 4.2% of the vote, electing a single MEP who sits with the European Conservatives and Reformists group. In the subsequent 2019 Greek legislative election, the party earned 3.7% of the vote, electing 10 MPs in the Hellenic Parliament.

In the Elections of May and June 2023, the party slightly increased its percentage, electing 16 and 12 MPs respectively.

In the 2024 European Parliament elections, the party more than doubled its vote share to 9.3%, electing 2 MEPs and becoming the fourth largest party, passing the KKE.

== Ideology and policies ==
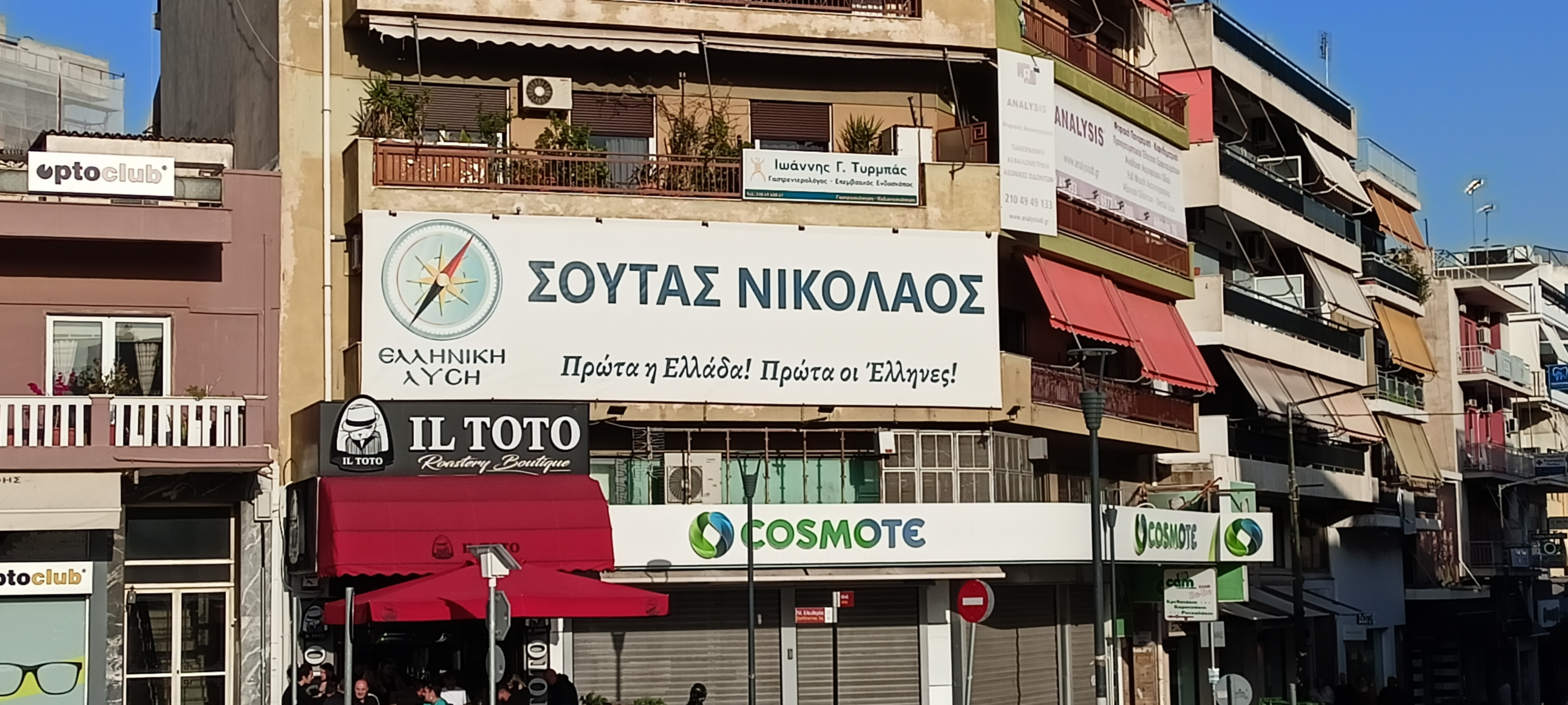
Poster for Greek Solution with the caption "Put Greece First! Put Greeks First!"

Greek Solution is a conservative, religious nationalist party that emphasizes action against illegal immigration, including installation of an electric fence on the Greece–Turkey border and detaining illegal immigrants on uninhabited islands as they await deportation. It supports a strict stance on illegal immigration. The party also advocates for shutting down NGOs operating in Greece, describing them as "trafficking companies". Velopoulos has expressed admiration for Hungarian Prime Minister Viktor Orbán and the governance of his Fidesz party in Hungary, particularly the country's economic and migration policies. Although, he has also mentioned that Orbán is not an ally for Greece due to his friendly stance with Turkey. He has also claimed the party stands for "Greece first", in reference to U.S. President Donald Trump's America First policy agenda.

According to the party's website, Greek Solution plans to primarily invest in the primary sector of the economy and geostrategy. The party opposes the Prespa agreement and the usage of the word "Macedonia" in the name of the neighbouring Republic of North Macedonia. Greek Solution is in favour of the proclamation of an EEZ and exploitation of the mineral wealth of Greece for heavy industry. It also supports the restructuring of the educational and health system. Greek Solution supports positions that are favorable to the Church of Greece. Alongside these, the party seeks to fix the demographic crisis through economic development, incentives for large families and promoting traditional family values.

The party expresses its support for economic nationalism. It seeks to develop the Greek industry and agricultural sector and launch various economic reforms according to its program, while also claiming that it seeks to govern in favour of the lower working class and the poor. Greek Solution seeks friendly relations with China, India, as well as Russia by taking pro-Russian stances, while being skeptical of increased defense cooperation with the United States.

In April 2024 Velopoulos stated that Vladimir Putin was forced to invade Ukraine. "They forced him to go to war. Imagine if the Russians sent troops to Mexico, to the border. The Americans would have invaded Mexico. They've sent troops all over Eastern Europe, they've made an anti-missile umbrella, and they've been waiting for Putin to swallow it. He's not going to swallow it. He's a strong leader." Εxpressed, also, the opinion that Greece needs leaders like Putin and Donald Trump. However, the party claims that it is not pro-Russian, but only cares for Greek national interests.

Greek Solution also takes a pro-Israel stance, citing strong Palestine-Turkey relations. However they have expressed that Palestinians need a state. Alongside these, the party supports the fulfillment of the EastMed pipeline. In addition, the party expresses mild Euroscepticism. The party supported a military agreement with France since 2019, and eventually voted in favor of the Greek-French military agreement in 2021, after proposing himself to the prime minister the purchase of Rafales by the Greek government.

The party has also said that if it comes to power it will ban pride parades and repeal the law of marriage of same sex people as well as the adoption by same sex couples. It has also promised to bring a law that will castrate any pedophile and give them and drug dealers a life imprisonment.

== Election results ==
=== Hellenic Parliament ===
| Election | Leader | Votes | % | ±pp | Seats | +/− | Rank | Government |
|---|---|---|---|---|---|---|---|---|
| 2019 | Kyriakos Velopoulos | 208,805 | 3.70% | New | 10 / 300 | New | 5th | Opposition |
| May 2023 | Kyriakos Velopoulos | 262,529 | 4.45% | +0.75 | 16 / 300 | ▲6 | 5th | Snap election |
| Jun 2023 | Kyriakos Velopoulos | 231,378 | 4.44% | −0.01 | 12 / 300 | ▼4 | 6th | Opposition |

=== European Parliament ===
| Election | Leader | Votes | % | ±pp | Seats | +/− | Rank | EP Group |
|---|---|---|---|---|---|---|---|---|
| 2019 | Kyriakos Velopoulos | 236,349 | 4.18% | New | 1 / 21 | New | 6th | ECR |
| 2024 | Kyriakos Velopoulos | 369,727 | 9.30% | +5.12 | 2 / 21 | ▲1 | 4th | ECR |
