= Lasithi (constituency) =

Parliamentary constituency of Greece

- Electoral constituency for the Hellenic Parliament
- Lasithi within Greece
- Regional units: Lasithi
- Administrative region: Crete
- Population: 68,791 (2015)

Current constituency
- Created: 2012
- Number of members: 2

The Lasithi electoral constituency (Greek: περιφέρεια Λασιθίου) is a parliamentary constituency of Greece.

== See also ==
- List of parliamentary constituencies of Greece
