= 2019 Greek parliamentary election =

- 7 July 2019

All 300 seats in the Hellenic Parliament 151 seats needed for a majority
- Opinion polls
- Registered: 9,962,261
- Turnout: 57.78% (▲1.62 pp)
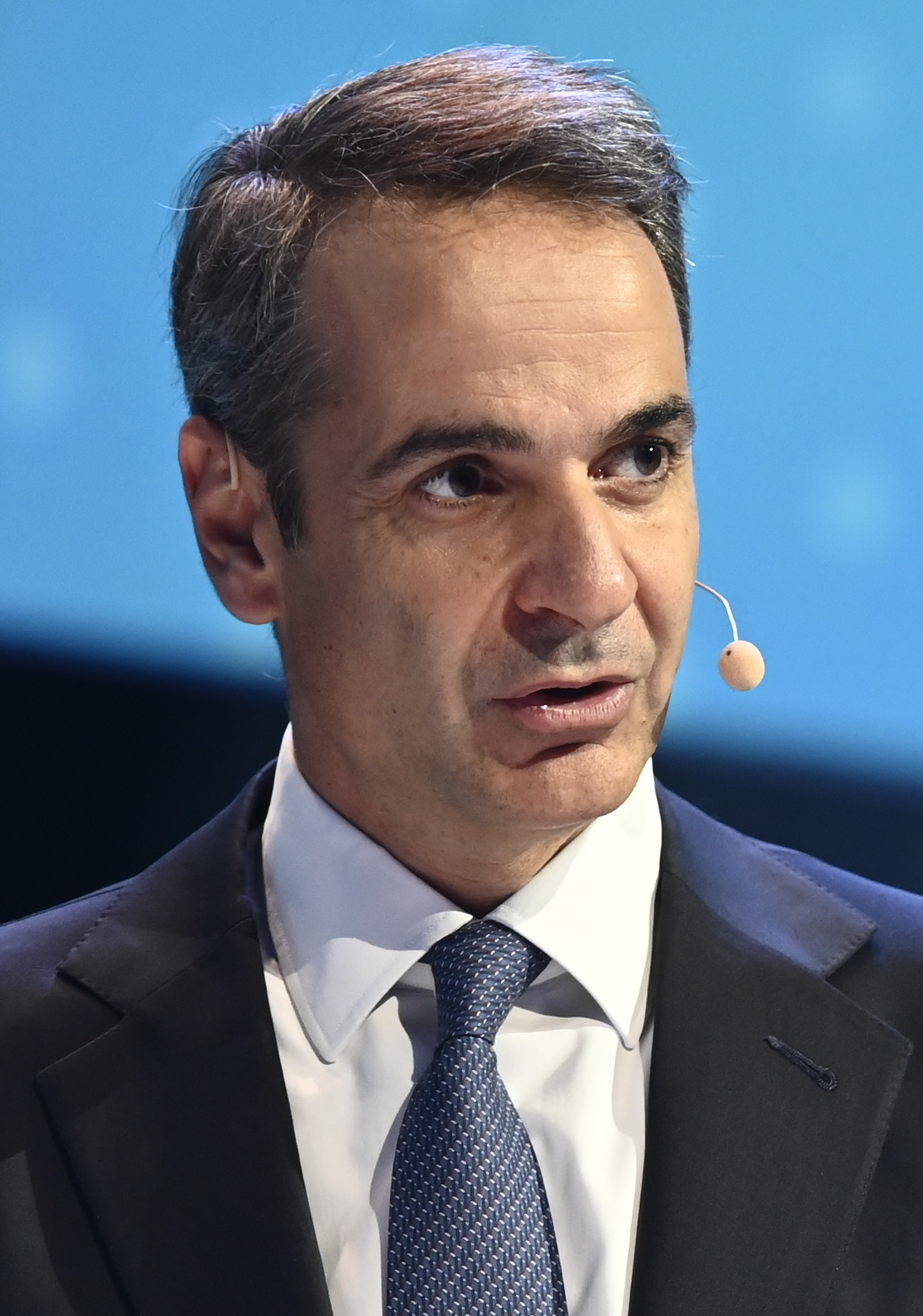

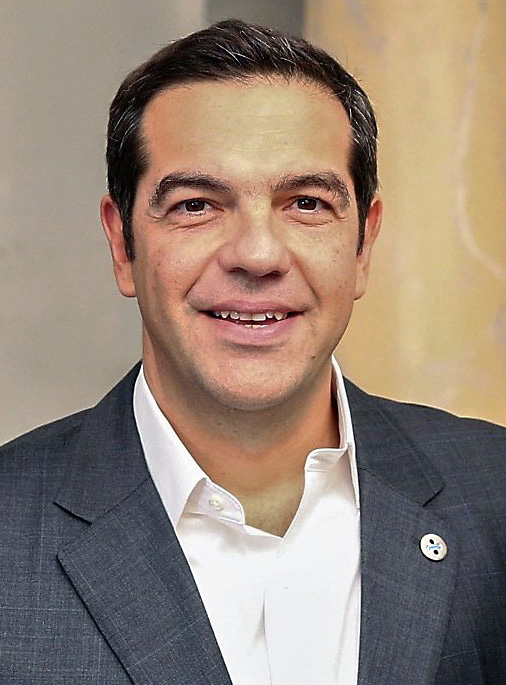

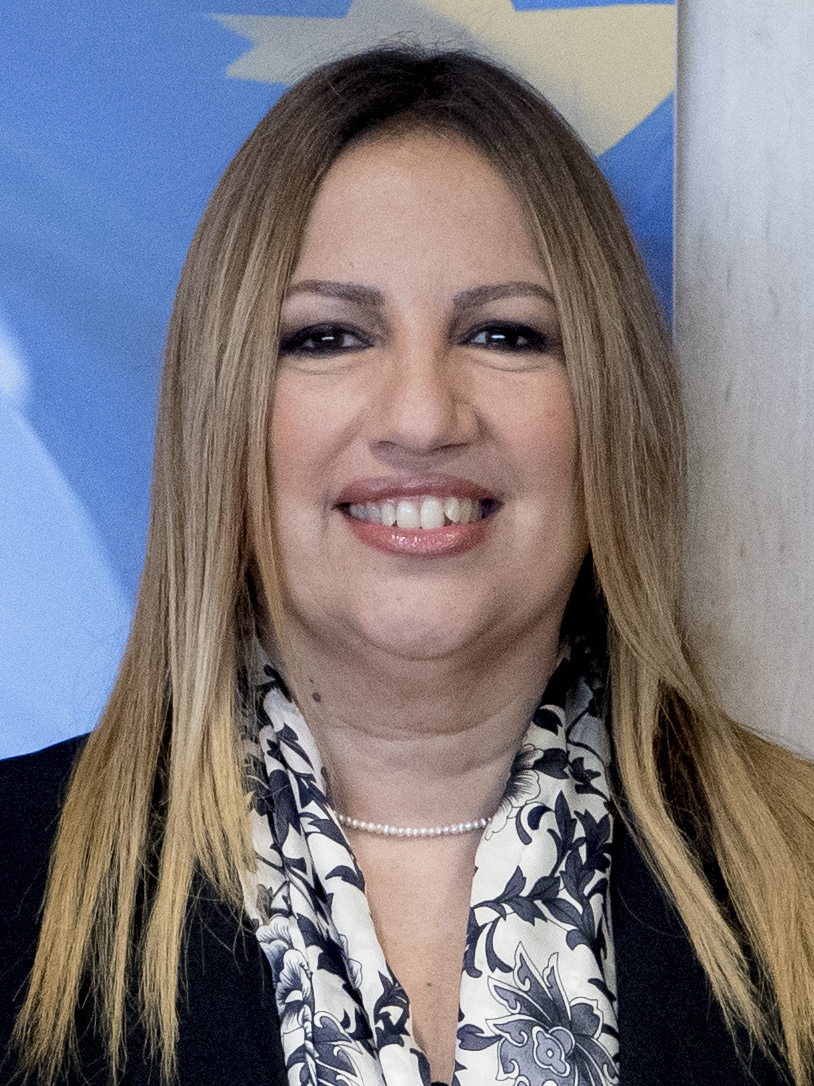

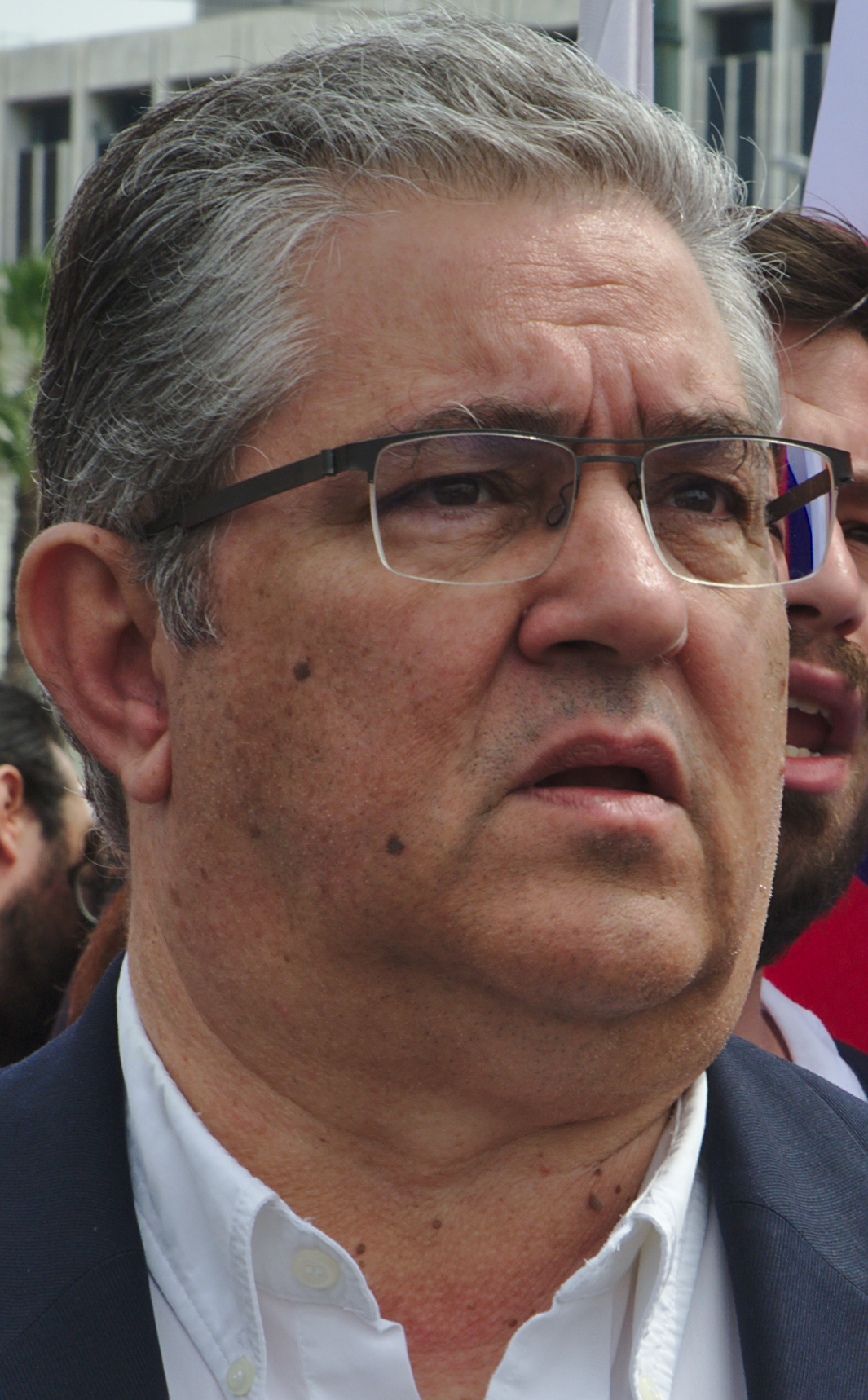

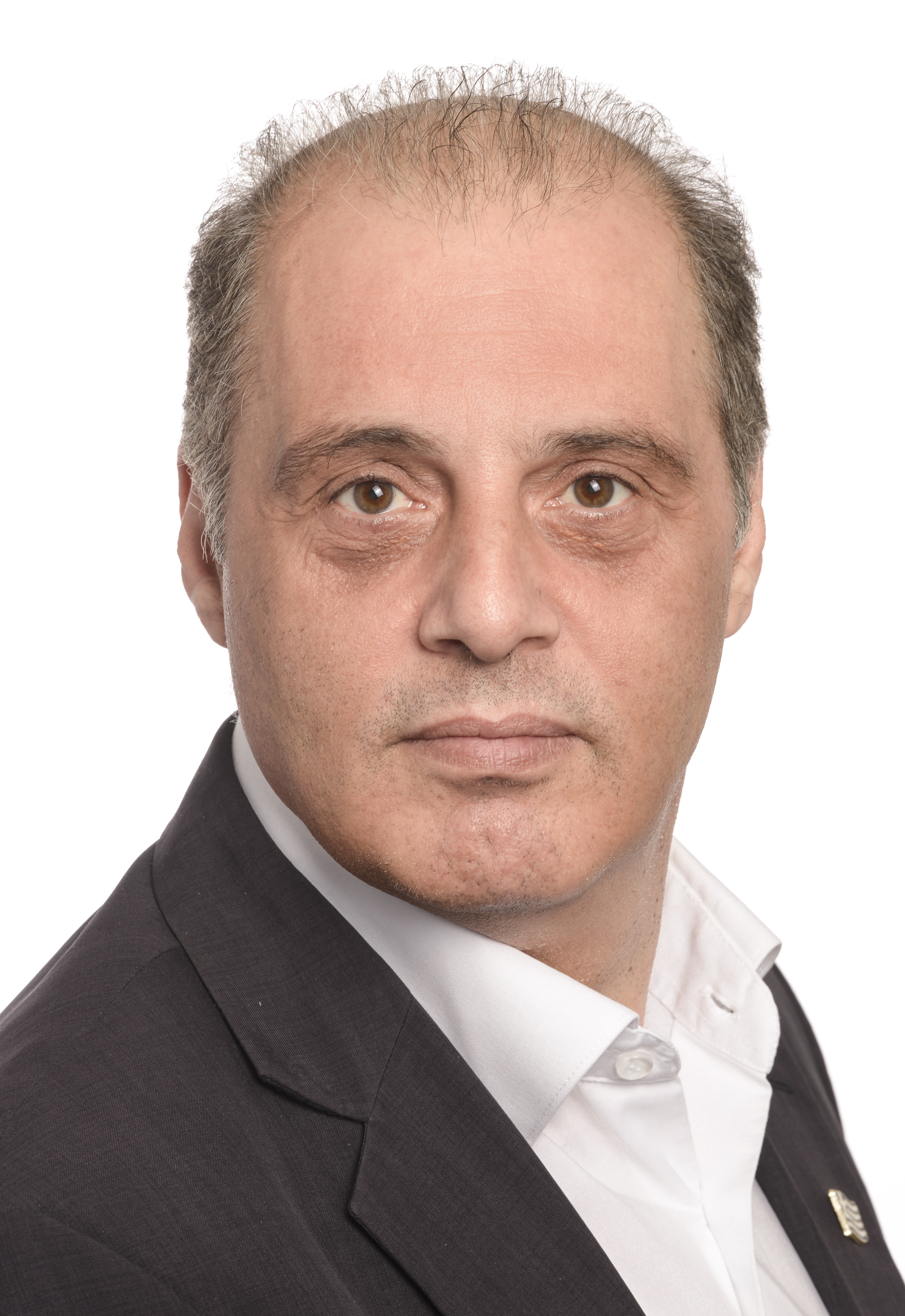

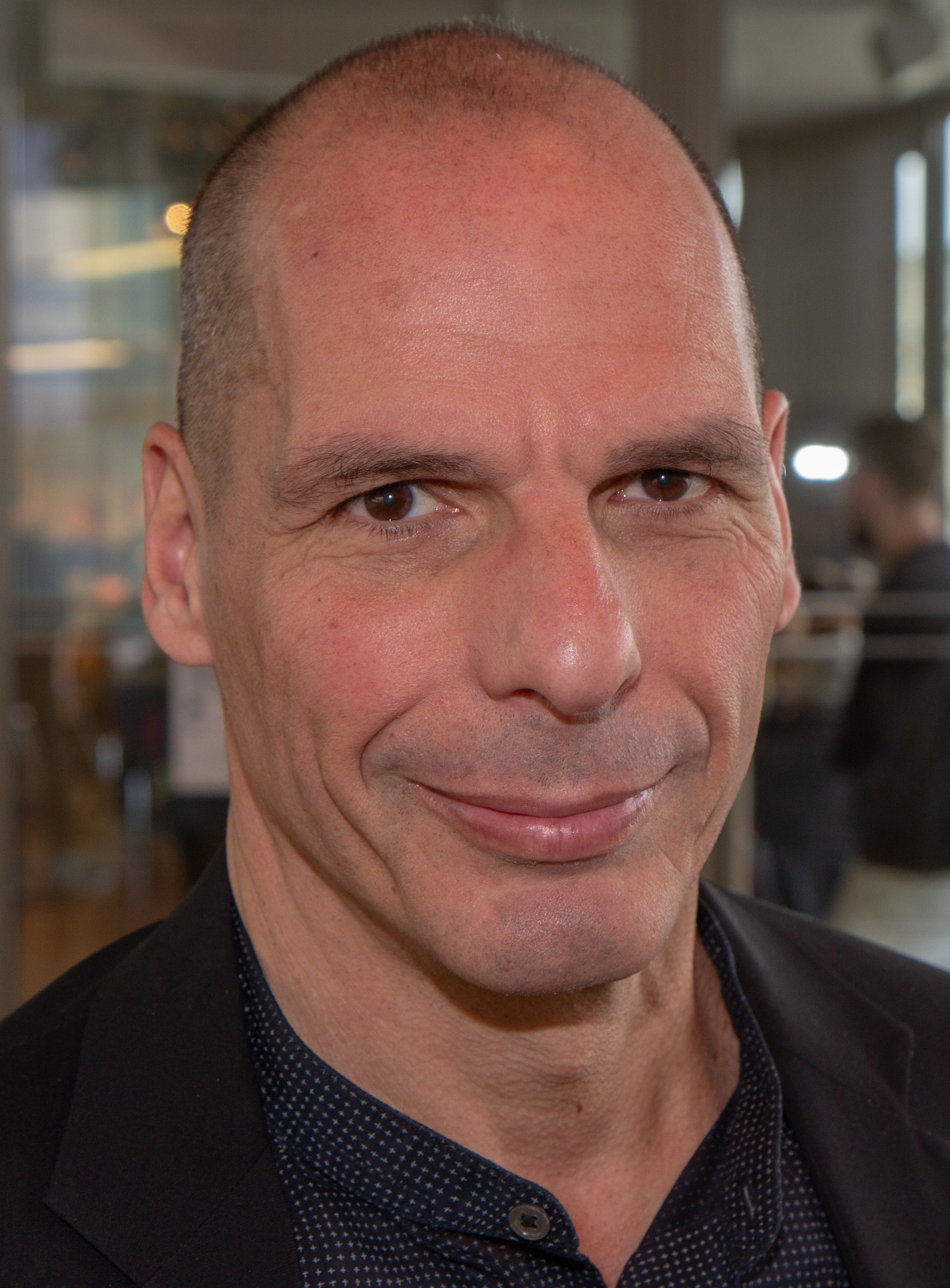
	First party	Second party	Third party
Leader	Kyriakos Mitsotakis	Alexis Tsipras	Fofi Gennimata
Party	ND	Syriza	KINAL
Last election	28.09%, 75 seats	35.46%, 145 seats	6.28%, 17 seats
Seats won	158	86	22
Seat change	▲83	▼59	▲5
Popular vote	2,251,618	1,781,057	457,623
Percentage	39.85%	31.53%	8.10%
Swing	▲11.76 pp	▼3.93 pp	▲1.72 pp
	Fourth party	Fifth party	Sixth party
Leader	Dimitris Koutsoumpas	Kyriakos Velopoulos	Yanis Varoufakis
Party	KKE	EL	MeRA25
Last election	5.55%, 15 seats	–	–
Seats won	15	10	9
Seat change	Steady	New	New
Popular vote	299,621	209,290	194,576
Percentage	5.30%	3.70%	3.44%
Swing	▼0.25 pp	New	New
- Results by constituency
Prime Minister before election
Alexis Tsipras
Syriza
Prime Minister after election
Kyriakos Mitsotakis
ND

Parliamentary elections were held in Greece on 7 July 2019. The elections were called by Prime Minister Alexis Tsipras on 26 May 2019 after the ruling Syriza party lost the European and local elections. They were the first national elections since the voting age was lowered to 17, and the number of parliamentary constituencies was increased from 56 to 59. Athens B, the largest constituency before the 2018 reforms, with 44 seats, was broken up into smaller constituencies, the largest of which had 18 seats.

The result was a landslide victory for the centre-right liberal conservative New Democracy party led by Kyriakos Mitsotakis, which received nearly 40% of the vote and won 158 seats, an outright majority. This was Greece's first single-party majority government since 2009.

== Electoral system ==
A visual representation of the seat allocation system used in Greece

Compulsory voting was in force for the elections, with voter registration being automatic. However, none of the legally existing penalties or sanctions have ever been enforced.

A number of changes to the electoral system were introduced following the September 2015 elections. The voting age was reduced from 18 to 17 in July 2016, with the same law also abolishing the majority bonus system, which gave a 50-seat bonus to the largest party. Instead, all 300 seats would be awarded proportionally. However, this law did not come into effect for the 2019 elections, as it was not approved with the required supermajority despite the Syriza-led government expressing support for its introduction for the 2019 elections. As a result, the previous system remained in force, with 250 seats elected in multi-member constituencies using a 3% electoral threshold, plus 50 bonus seats for the largest party.

The number of parliamentary constituencies was also modified in December 2018, with Athens B split into Athens B1 (North), Athens B2 (West), and Athens B3 (South), while Attica was split into East Attica and West Attica.

== Opinion polls ==
Local regression trend line of poll results from 20 September 2015 to 7 July 2019, with each line corresponding to a political party.

== Conduct ==
A few minutes before the polls closed, a group of young protesters stormed the 33rd polling station in the district of Exarcheia, Athens, and stole the ballot box. A previously-unknown anarchist group, Ballot-seeking Arsonists, later claimed responsibility. It claimed to have burned the stolen ballot box. As a result, a repeat election at the same polling station was held a week later, on 14 July. The results did not change the final allocation of seats because of the small volume of votes.

== Results ==
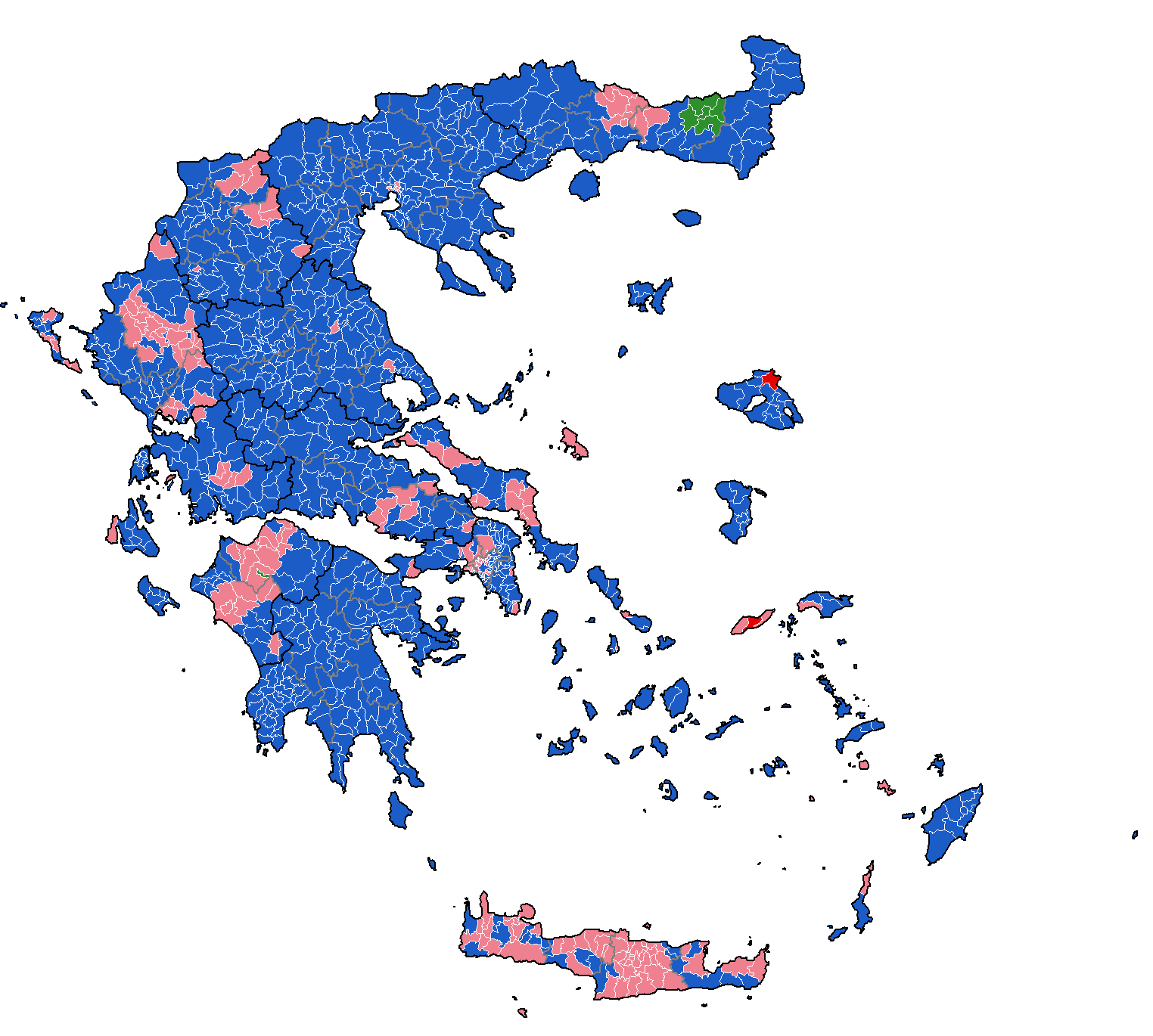
Results, showing the winning party in each municipal unit. ND (820) SYRIZA (197) PASOK (5) KKE (2)

Party	Votes	%	Seats	+/–
New Democracy	2,251,618	39.85	158	+83
Syriza	1,781,057	31.53	86	–59
Movement for Change	457,623	8.10	22	+5
Communist Party of Greece	299,621	5.30	15	0
Greek Solution	209,290	3.70	10	New
MeRA25	194,576	3.44	9	New
Golden Dawn	165,620	2.93	0	–18
Course of Freedom	82,786	1.47	0	New
Union of Centrists	70,178	1.24	0	–9
Recreate Greece	41,631	0.74	0	0
United Popular Front–Agricultural Livestock Party	28,313	0.50	0	0
Antarsya	23,239	0.41	0	0
Popular Unity	15,612	0.28	0	0
Assembly of Greeks	14,079	0.25	0	New
Communist Party of Greece (Marxist–Leninist)	7,760	0.14	0	0
Marxist–Leninist Communist Party of Greece	2,706	0.05	0	0
Workers Revolutionary Party	1,719	0.03	0	0
Organisation of Internationalist Communists	1,576	0.03	0	0
Syn...Fonia Politikon Kommaton	51	0.00	0	New
Greek Ecologists	0	0.00	0	0
Independents	472	0.01	0	0
Total	5,649,527	100.00	300	0
Valid votes	5,649,527	97.92		
Invalid votes	77,477	1.34		
Blank votes	42,640	0.74		
Total votes	5,769,644	100.00		
Registered voters/turnout	9,984,934	57.78		
Source: Ministry of the Interior

=== By region ===
Constituency	ND		SYRIZA		KINAL (Note: Compared to DISY)		KKE		EL		MERA25		XA		PE		EK	
Constituency	%	±	%	±	%	±	%	±	%	±	%	±	%	±	%	±	%	±
Achaea	32.43	▲10.06	40.27	▼1.20	8.91	▲1.28	5.45	▼0.37	3.24	New	3.14	New	2.12	▼3.43	1.60	New	1.17	▼1.47
Aetolia-Akarnania	40.95	▲10.24	33.89	▼1.23	10.24	▲1.75	4.93	▼1.12	1.69	New	2.13	New	2.74	▼4.26	0.89	New	0.75	▼1.20
Argolis	43.43	▲9.71	24.99	▼4.52	14.84	▲5.25	3.56	▼0.68	3.25	New	3.12	New	2.68	▼5.87	1.15	New	0.69	▼1.71
Arkadia	42.56	▲8.75	30.14	▼0.53	10.81	▲0.90	4.54	▼0.36	2.75	New	2.67	New	2.58	▼4.17	1.07	New	0.88	▼1.60
Arta	38.99	▲8.22	39.94	▼0.82	8.44	▲1.36	4.83	▼0.89	1.43	New	1.98	New	1.50	▼2.71	0.66	New	0.56	▼1.33
Athens A	42.32	▲11.20	31.29	▼0.26	5.16	▲0.48	6.37	▲0.54	2.58	New	3.84	New	3.09	▼3.82	1.51	New	1.18	▼2.21
Athens B1	45.81	▲13.04	28.22	▼2.88	5.59	▲0.98	6.19	▲0.50	2.54	New	4.15	New	2.00	▼2.84	1.39	New	1.31	▼2.15
Athens B2	29.69	▲10.05	38.60	▼2.58	6.00	▲1.52	8.65	▲0.14	3.51	New	4.28	New	3.16	▼3.82	1.73	New	1.54	▼2.00
Athens B3	39.49	▲12.30	32.03	▼3.29	5.72	▲0.95	7.13	▲0.37	2.99	New	4.44	New	2.42	▼3.14	1.51	New	1.47	▼2.32
East Attica	43.13	▲14.11	29.60	▼5.42	5.03	▲1.00	4.96	▲0.11	4.85	New	3.87	New	3.16	▼4.64	1.61	New	1.44	▼1.78
West Attica	34.28	▲12.88	36.24	▼4.56	5.24	▲1.01	5.93	▼0.17	5.24	New	3.20	New	4.62	▼6.70	1.58	New	1.21	▼1.69
Boeotia	36.25	▲12.95	32.27	▼5.42	9.70	▲3.04	7.01	▲0.01	3.39	New	3.41	New	3.23	▼4.47	1.44	New	0.99	▼1.36
Cephalonia	37.94	▲10.39	32.45	▼1.50	5.82	▲0.07	9.52	▼0.60	2.49	New	3.45	New	2.99	▼4.39	1.78	New	0.92	▼1.67
Chalkidiki	42.59	▲9.30	24.32	▼8.58	10.37	▲3.31	3.14	▼0.15	4.33	New	3.81	New	5.26	▼1.96	1.91	New	1.58	▼2.57
Chania	34.05	▲14.65	37.35	▼4.32	6.54	▼0.03	5.02	▼0.43	3.13	New	4.85	New	2.45	▼3.67	2.42	New	1.10	▼1.35
Chios	45.65	▲13.07	22.14	▼5.77	14.94	▲1.83	4.78	▼0.25	2.43	New	2.89	New	2.98	▼2.84	1.36	New	1.27	▼1.94
Corfu	35.14	▲12.95	34.41	▼6.18	7.50	▲1.81	6.99	▼0.07	2.40	New	4.84	New	3.18	▼4.37	2.13	New	0.97	▼1.78
Corinthia	41.80	▲12.15	30.73	▼4.31	8.47	▲1.51	2.80	▼0.29	4.11	New	3.68	New	3.41	▼5.25	1.53	New	1.07	▼2.12
Cyclades	43.55	▲12.27	28.32	▼5.36	8.52	▲1.68	4.20	▼0.24	2.88	New	4.10	New	2.78	▼3.41	1.85	New	1.38	▼2.09
Dodecanese	41.28	▲13.15	29.73	▼4.81	10.37	▲0.88	3.20	▼0.20	3.87	New	3.01	New	3.69	▼4.36	1.70	New	1.03	▼1.97
Drama	43.90	▲12.03	22.72	▼7.00	12.31	▲3.76	2.78	▼0.32	6.70	New	3.10	New	2.96	▼4.13	1.57	New	1.37	▼2.98
Elis	36.03	▲9.11	34.82	▼2.49	14.79	▲4.04	3.62	▼1.00	2.88	New	2.21	New	2.40	▼5.19	1.28	New	0.61	▼1.36
Euboea	36.61	▲12.64	34.91	▼5.03	8.53	▲2.00	4.98	▼0.41	4.16	New	3.14	New	2.64	▼5.29	1.96	New	1.10	▼1.85
Evros	44.99	▲11.29	27.55	▼4.32	8.17	▲1.34	2.95	▼0.01	5.86	New	2.39	New	3.52	▼5.19	0.81	New	1.32	▼1.91
Evrytania	48.87	▲14.54	29.54	▼3.93	9.94	▲0.34	2.79	▼0.15	2.14	New	1.84	New	1.61	▼3.09	0.85	New	0.90	▼1.33
Florina	39.02	▲8.74	35.51	▼2.33	6.24	▲0.13	3.07	▼1.24	7.27	New	2.78	New	2.37	▼4.37	1.10	New	1.10	▼1.70
Grevena	43.16	▲11.01	29.49	▼5.02	9.89	▲0.53	5.82	▼0.42	2.74	New	2.32	New	2.87	▼2.74	0.84	New	0.99	▼1.74
Imathia	41.92	▲14.36	26.98	▼7.30	8.24	▲1.41	4.68	▼0.46	5.63	New	3.06	New	4.04	▼5.22	1.71	New	1.39	▼2.57
Ioannina	37.42	▲9.09	36.30	▼3.22	9.53	▲2.17	4.99	▼0.51	2.34	New	2.79	New	1.94	▼2.81	1.02	New	0.91	▼1.62
Heraklion	30.15	▲9.82	43.22	▼1.99	11.38	▲1.66	3.57	▼0.67	2.18	New	4.03	New	1.51	▼2.43	1.00	New	0.81	▼1.39
Karditsa	44.91	▲14.06	30.45	▼5.29	9.42	▲2.26	5.60	▲0.88	2.49	New	1.87	New	2.29	▼5.05	0.75	New	0.59	▼1.77
Kastoria	50.23	▲13.29	27.10	▼1.86	7.00	▲0.96	2.53	▼0.54	2.73	New	2.98	New	2.98	▼5.58	1.01	New	1.10	▼3.11
Kavala	42.55	▲11.50	26.20	▼6.20	8.48	▲1.53	4.18	▼0.18	5.86	New	3.13	New	3.35	▼4.45	1.59	New	1.71	▼2.60
Kilkis	42.35	▲9.94	23.22	▼7.67	11.21	▲4.15	5.05	▼0.93	5.16	New	2.70	New	5.24	▼4.23	1.40	New	1.34	▼2.86
Kozani	39.39	▲11.50	31.39	▼2.47	10.30	▲2.52	4.64	▼0.79	4.01	New	2.96	New	2.54	▼3.66	1.39	New	1.43	▼2.15
Laconia	49.91	▲12.37	19.63	▼3.44	14.39	▲1.98	3.57	▼0.53	3.19	New	2.01	New	3.64	▼7.80	1.00	New	0.61	▼1.34
Larissa	39.30	▲11.31	31.25	▼3.68	8.79	▲2.54	6.25	▼1.00	4.34	New	2.81	New	2.82	▼4.23	1.19	New	1.15	▼2.10
Lasithi	34.32	▲8.34	34.57	▼4.62	15.40	▲4.06	2.93	▼0.33	2.64	New	3.08	New	1.52	▼2.43	1.32	New	0.94	▼1.18
Lefkada	44.37	▲12.37	28.19	▼2.49	9.60	▲1.73	8.16	▼2.32	1.30	New	2.81	New	1.83	▼3.44	1.04	New	0.69	▼1.47
Lesbos	38.99	▲10.44	29.01	▼0.01	8.57	▲0.88	10.04	▼0.64	2.62	New	2.25	New	3.48	▼4.30	1.04	New	1.20	▼1.14
Magnesia	38.76	▲12.58	32.16	▼3.90	6.58	▲1.79	5.33	▼0.91	4.34	New	3.78	New	3.89	▼4.57	1.49	New	0.97	▼2.02
Messenia	44.37	▲8.91	30.66	▲0.16	6.85	▲0.91	4.69	▼0.74	3.35	New	3.02	New	2.86	▼5.24	1.00	New	0.80	▼1.93
Pella	42.29	▲10.74	28.52	▼4.74	9.31	▲2.62	2.59	▼1.06	5.60	New	2.50	New	3.59	▼5.83	1.60	New	1.54	▼3.26
Phocis	44.75	▲12.59	29.16	▼3.82	7.35	▲0.81	6.04	▼0.20	3.01	New	3.00	New	2.62	▼4.48	1.23	New	0.77	▼1.38
Phthiotis	43.79	▲12.74	31.64	▼2.98	7.59	▲0.86	4.38	▼0.40	3.19	New	2.58	New	2.82	▼4.95	1.38	New	0.81	▼1.46
Pieria	47.45	▲14.77	23.33	▼9.10	8.52	▲1.90	3.98	▼0.47	5.73	New	2.78	New	3.21	▼4.22	1.50	New	1.37	▼2.90
Piraeus A	43.73	▲14.28	29.72	▼3.91	4.94	▲0.54	5.51	▲0.37	3.39	New	3.88	New	3.18	▼4.64	1.70	New	1.60	▼2.77
Piraeus B	30.19	▲11.87	38.22	▼3.80	5.09	▲1.07	8.02	▲0.08	4.20	New	4.40	New	3.69	▼4.71	2.06	New	1.57	▼2.20
Preveza	43.47	▲11.02	34.38	▼1.07	8.25	▲0.23	5.49	▼1.27	1.39	New	2.07	New	1.65	▼3.43	0.78	New	0.63	▼1.10
Rethymno	36.55	▲9.18	36.99	▼1.14	9.82	▼0.49	3.33	▼0.04	2.30	New	3.45	New	1.72	▼2.32	2.25	New	0.82	▼1.37
Rhodope	37.84	▲15.10	27.17	▼12.18	21.94	▲17.38	4.25	▲2.17	2.57	New	1.38	New	2.17	▼3.29	0.54	New	0.56	▼1.48
Samos	34.13	▲11.65	29.08	▼1.93	6.85	▲0.79	14.47	▼1.67	3.30	New	2.81	New	3.55	▼4.11	1.93	New	0.88	▼1.55
Serres	48.04	▲12.83	23.25	▼5.83	8.68	▲1.68	3.41	▼0.23	6.11	New	3.13	New	2.94	▼4.97	1.09	New	1.22	▼2.91
Thesprotia	41.14	▲9.75	31.54	▼5.58	13.28	▲4.12	3.73	▼0.71	1.81	New	2.50	New	1.61	▼3.11	0.79	New	0.53	▼1.50
Thessaloniki A	35.52	▲10.23	31.31	▼4.50	6.05	▲1.73	5.30	▼0.01	5.39	New	4.76	New	3.92	▼3.35	2.19	New	2.29	▼4.49
Thessaloniki B	43.02	▲13.52	25.14	▼7.74	6.65	▲1.91	4.61	▼0.20	5.65	New	4.06	New	4.20	▼4.24	1.72	New	2.00	▼4.01
Trikala	44.40	▲13.59	29.54	▼6.26	9.71	▲2.37	6.07	▼1.04	2.85	New	2.05	New	1.82	▼3.83	0.84	New	0.78	▼1.95
Xanthi	36.78	▲12.95	39.60	▼10.01	8.78	▲4.68	2.19	▼0.45	3.44	New	2.35	New	2.62	▼2.97	1.08	New	0.78	▼2.20
Zakynthos	41.91	▲14.40	31.44	▼4.72	5.37	▼1.09	9.04	▼1.16	2.21	New	3.32	New	2.36	▼4.37	1.22	New	0.67	▼1.15

== See also ==
- List of members of the Hellenic Parliament, 2019
