= 2019 European Parliament election in Greece =

- 26 May 2019

All 21 Greek seats in the European Parliament
- Turnout: 58.69%
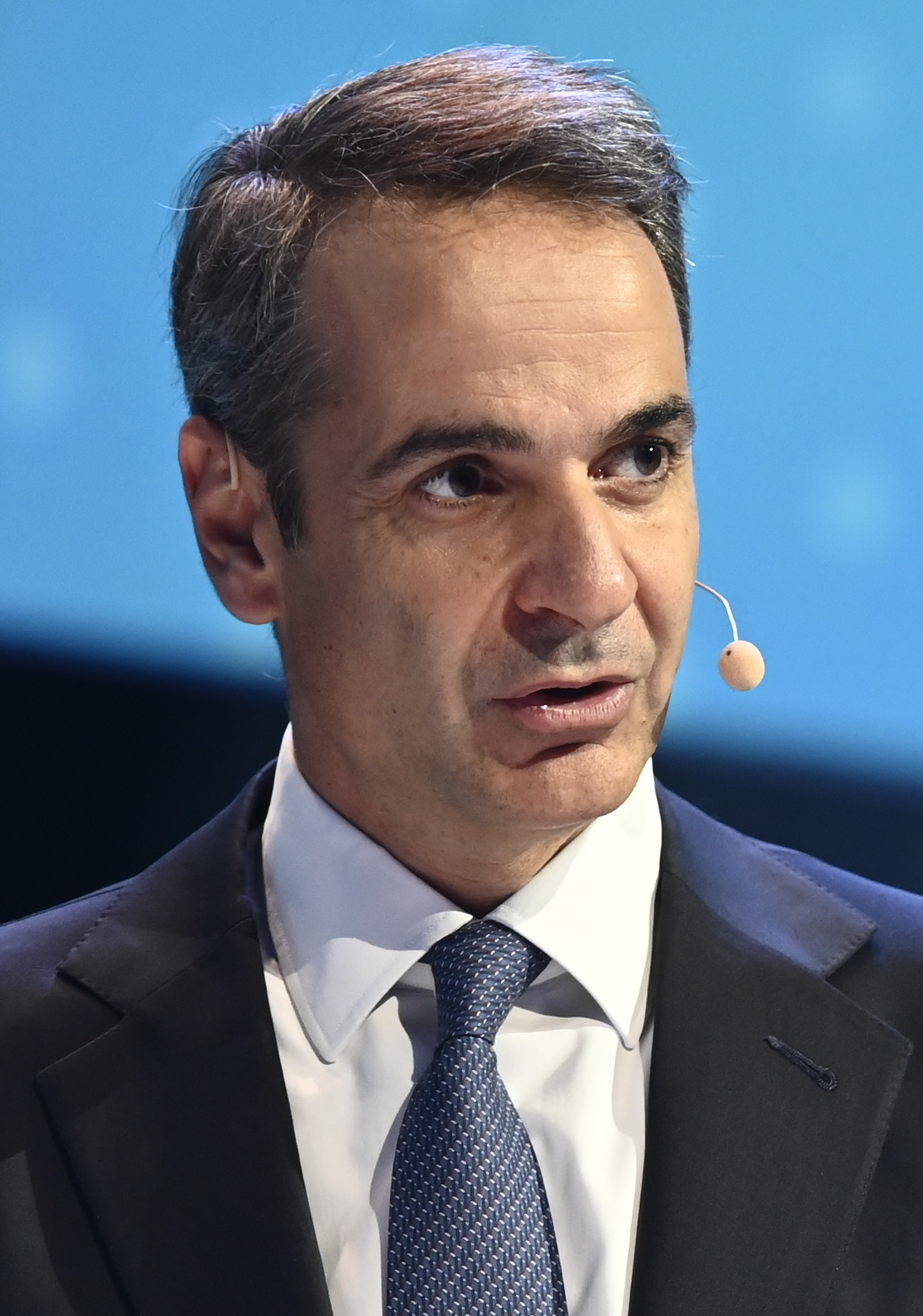

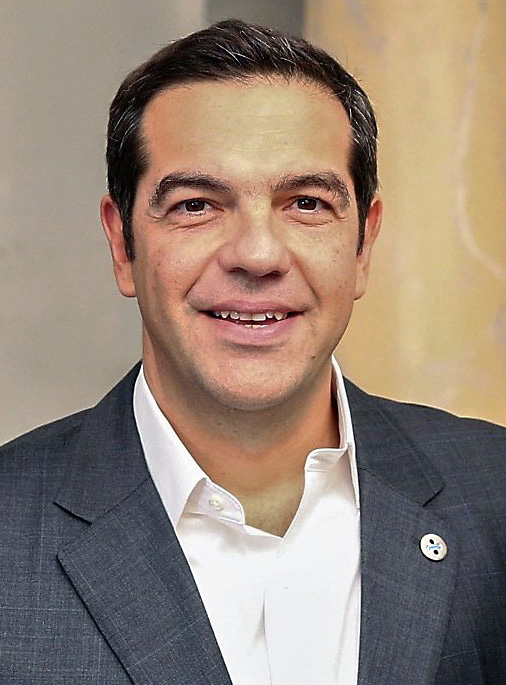

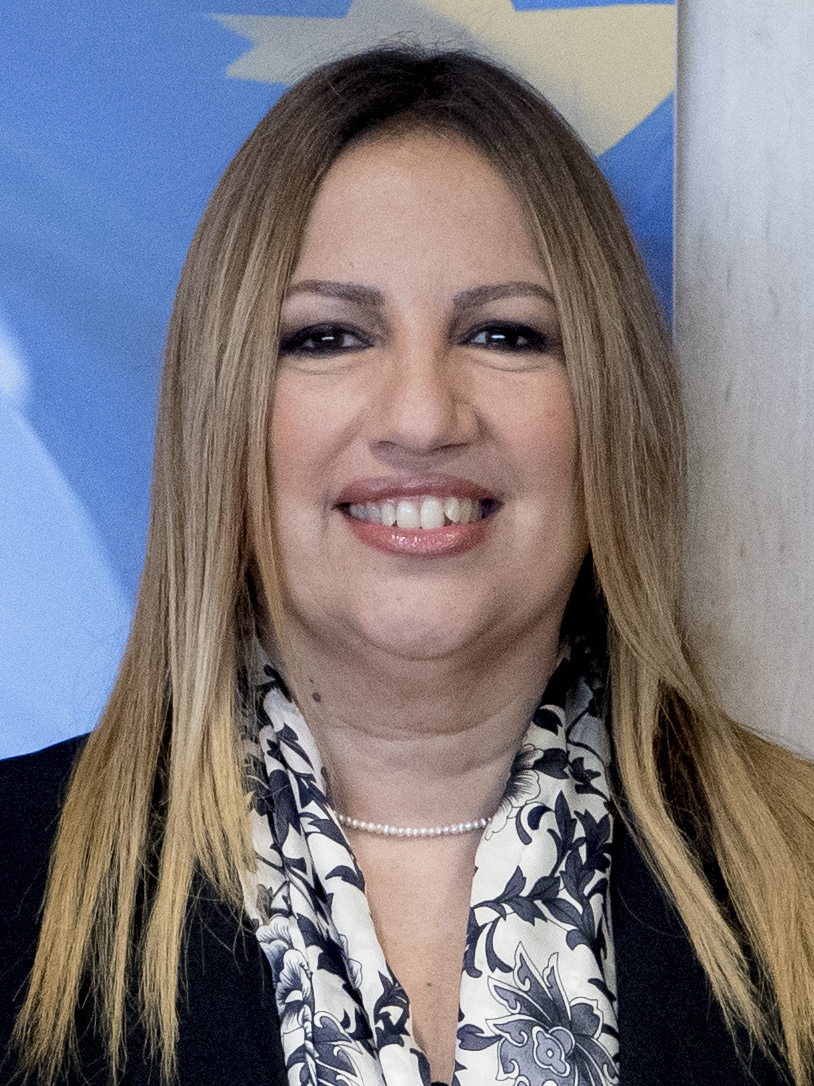

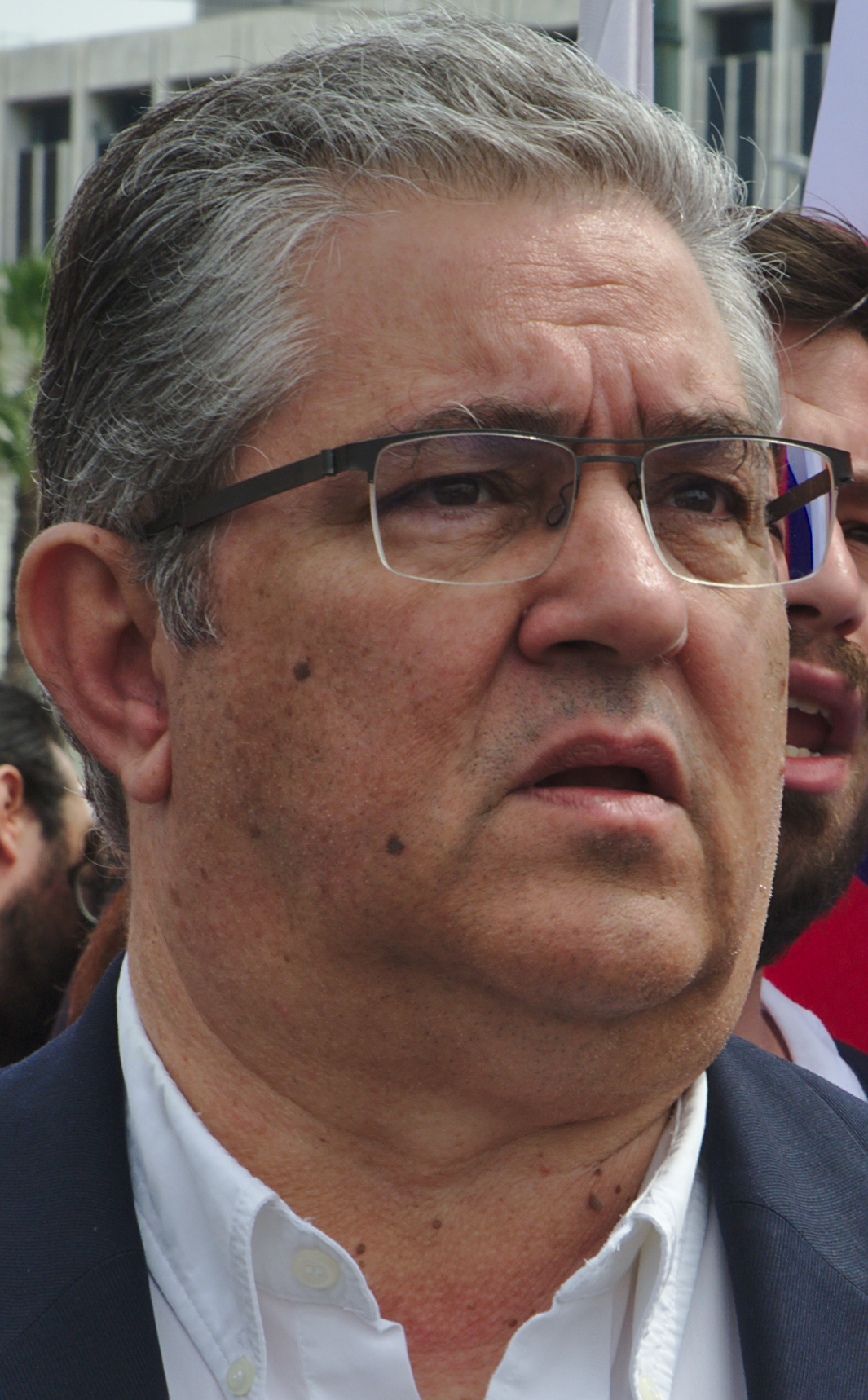

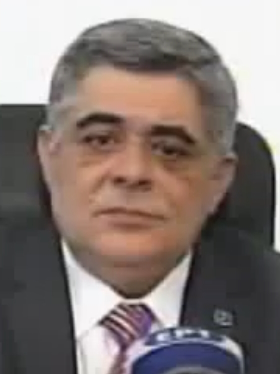

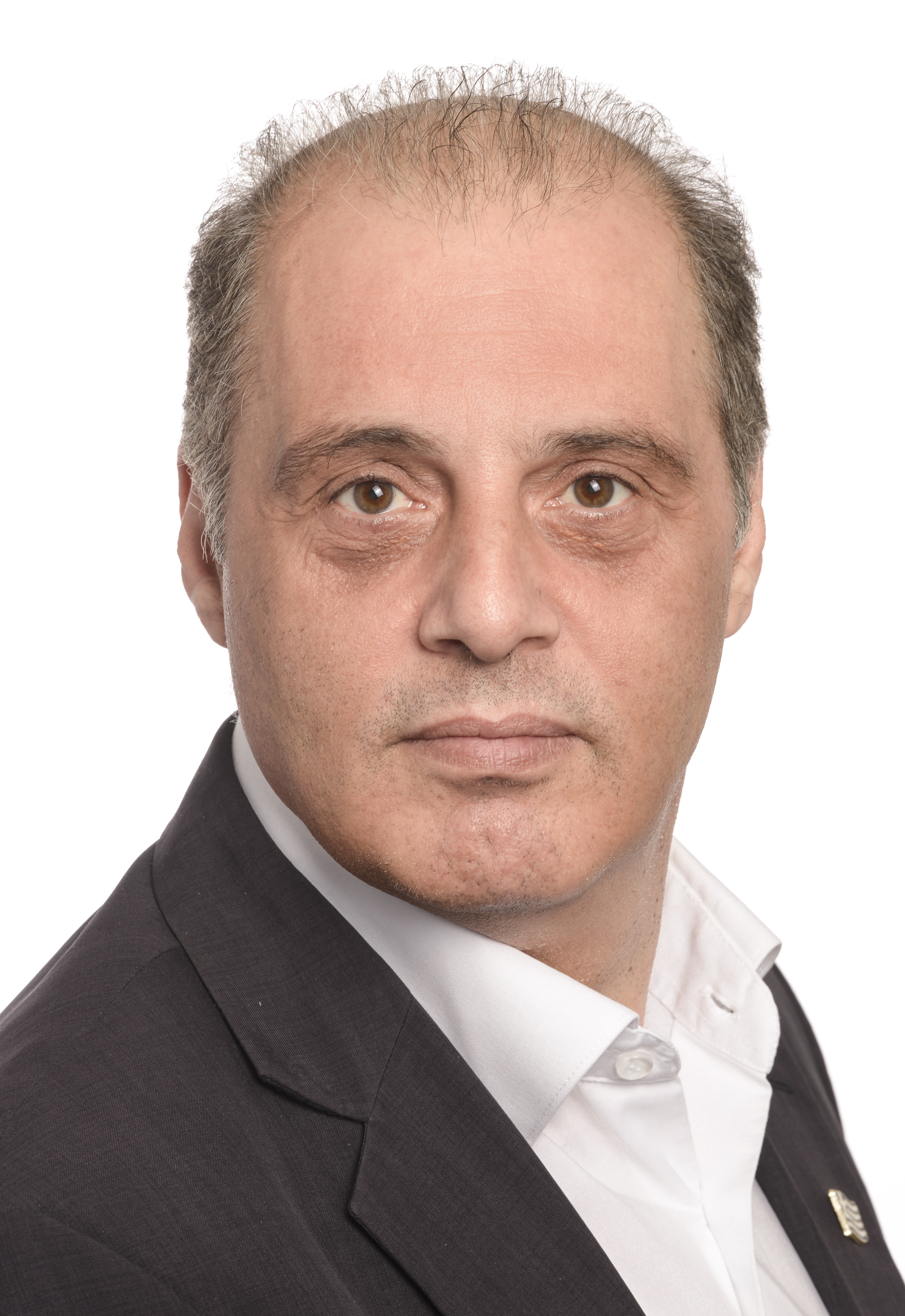
	First party	Second party	Third party
Leader	Kyriakos Mitsotakis	Alexis Tsipras	Fofi Gennimata
Party	ND	Syriza	KINAL
Alliance	EPP	European Left	PES
Last election	22.72%, 5 seats	26.56%, 6 seats	8.02%, 2 seats
Seats won	8	6	2
Seat change	▲3	Steady	Steady
Popular vote	1,873,137	1,343,595	436,726
Percentage	33.12%	23.75%	7.72%
Swing	▲10.40	▼2.81	▼0.30
	Fourth party	Fifth party	Sixth party
Leader	Dimitris Koutsoumpas	Nikolaos Michaloliakos	Kyriakos Velopoulos
Party	KKE	ΧΑ	EL
Alliance	INITIATIVE
Last election	6.11%, 2 seats	9.39%, 3 seats	–
Seats won	2	2	1
Seat change	Steady	▼1	New
Popular vote	302,603	275,734	236,347
Percentage	5.35%	4.87%	4.18%
Swing	▼0.76	▼4.52	New
- Map of Greek electoral districts, showing the largest party by share of votes. Darker shades indicate stronger vote share.

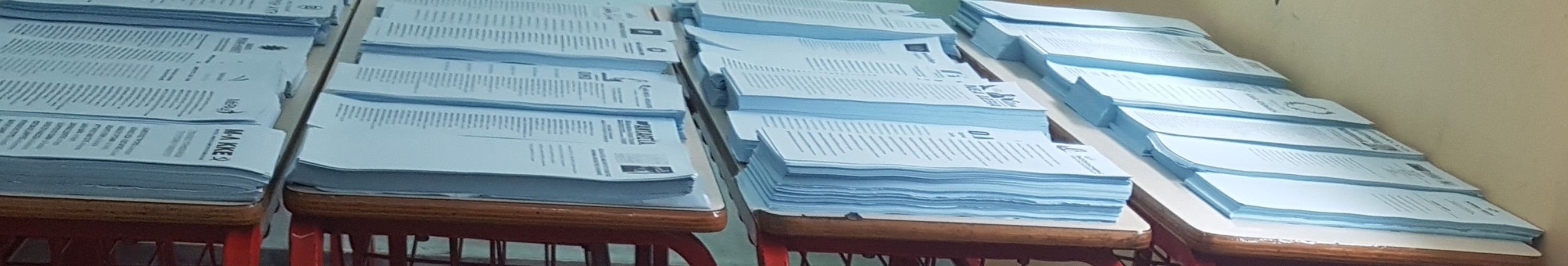
Ballots for European elections in Greece 2019

European Parliament elections were held in Greece on 26 May 2019 to elect the 21 Greek members of the European Parliament. The elections were held alongside the first round of the local and regional government elections, resulting in a major defeat for the governing Syriza party, and leading to Prime Minister Alexis Tsipras bringing forward the scheduled parliamentary elections for 7 July 2019.

== Participating parties ==
Parties and coalitions participating in the elections:

- Syriza
- Communist Party of Greece (KKE)
- Course of Freedom
- Democracy Left
- Democratic Responsibility
- Ecologist Greens
- European Realistic Disobedience Front (MeRA25)
- Front of the Greek Anticapitalist Left
- Golden Dawn (XA)
- Greece, the Other Way [el]
- Greek Ecologists
- Greek Solution
- Greens
- Independent Greeks
- Liberal Alliance
- Marxist–Leninist Communist Party of Greece
- Movement for Change (KINAL)
- National Front-Patriotic League-Lions' Movement
- New Democracy (ND)
- New Greek Momentum [el]
- New Right
- Organisation of Internationalist Communists of Greece
- Panhellenic Citizen Chariot
- Party of Friendship, Equality and Peace
- Popular Orthodox Rally-Patriotic Radical Union [el]
- Popular Unity-Pirate Party of Greece
- Rainbow
- Recreate Greece
- The River
- Union of Centrists

== Opinion polls ==
Polling firm/Commissioner	Fieldwork date	Sample size	Syriza	ND	KINAL	XA	KKE	Union of Centrists	EL	Potami	ANEL	M25	LAE	PE	EG	Lead
Pulse/Skai	18–20 Apr 2019	1,010	25.0	35.5	8.5	8.5	6.5	2.5	2.5	1.5	1.5	1.5	1.5	1.0	-	10.5
Interview/Vergina TV	15–17 Apr 2019	1,005	22.7	36.4	7.9	7.2	7.0	2.0	2.3	1.4	1.3	0.6	1.3	1.3	-	13.7
Metron Analysis/Alpha TV	15–17 Apr 2019	1,200	25.6	35.0	8.5	5.9	7.5	2.6	2.4	2.1	1.2	2.1	-	-	1.9	9.4
Marc/Proto Thema	26 Mar–1 Apr 2019	1,200	24.8	39.2	8.9	7.2	6.3	2.0	2.0	1.5	-	2.1	-	-	1.3	14.4
MRB/Star	1–3 Apr 2019	1,003	25.6	36.5	7.5	7.5	6.7	2.4	1.9	2.1	1.2	1.2	-	-	2.3	10.9
Metron Analysis/To Vima	18–20 Mar 2019	1,204	23.9	36.1	7.7	7.1	6.4	1.5	-	2.0	1.5	1.5	1.6	-	3.1	12.2

== Results ==
Party	Votes	%	Seats	+/–
New Democracy	1,873,137	33.12	8	+3
Syriza	1,343,595	23.75	6	0
Movement for Change	436,726	7.72	2	0
Communist Party of Greece	302,603	5.35	2	0
Golden Dawn	275,734	4.87	2	−1
Greek Solution	236,347	4.18	1	New
Mera 25	169,635	3.00	0	New
Course of Freedom	90,927	1.61	0	New
The River	85,934	1.52	0	−2
Union of Centrists	82,084	1.45	0	0
Greece, the Other Way	70,347	1.24	0	New
Popular Orthodox Rally–Patriotic Radical Union	69,779	1.23	0	0
Citizens	51,398	0.91	0	New
Ecologist Greens	49,418	0.87	0	0
Independent Greeks	45,148	0.80	0	–1
Free Homeland	41,269	0.73	0	New
Party of Friendship, Equality and Peace	40,211	0.71	0	0
Recreate Greece	39,217	0.69	0	0
New Right	37,540	0.66	0	New
Antarsya	36,361	0.64	0	0
Agricultural Livestock Party of Greece	32,014	0.57	0	0
Popular Unity–Pirate Party of Greece	31,648	0.56	0	0
Assembly of Greeks	29,509	0.52	0	New
Greens – Solidarity	25,245	0.45	0	0
Union for the Defense of Labour and the Social State – Strong Greece	22,341	0.39	0	New
Youth Party	18,458	0.33	0	New
Democratic Responsibility	18,207	0.32	0	New
New Greek Momentum	12,278	0.22	0	New
Marxist–Leninist Communist Party of Greece	12,231	0.22	0	0
Greek Ecologists	11,511	0.20	0	0
National Front–Patriotic League–Lions' Movement	10,742	0.19	0	0
People's European Social Groups	10,264	0.18	0	0
Panhellenic Citizen Chariot	9,893	0.17	0	0
Greek Radicals	9,242	0.16	0	New
Rainbow	6,364	0.11	0	0
Liberal Alliance	6,032	0.11	0	New
Organisation of Internationalist Communists of Greece	4,803	0.08	0	0
Kollatos	3,065	0.05	0	0
LEFKO–AKE–EPKA	2,886	0.05	0	New
Greek Vision	1,976	0.03	0	New
Total	5,656,119	100.00	21	0
Valid votes	5,656,119	95.54		
Invalid/blank votes	264,236	4.46		
Total votes	5,920,355	100.00		
Registered voters/turnout	10,088,325	58.69		
Source: Ministry of the Interior

=== Elected MEPs ===
==== New Democracy ====
- Stelios Kympouropoulos (577,114 votes)
- Vangelis Meimarakis (496,600 votes)
- Maria Spyraki (319,237 votes)
- Eliza Vozemberg (288,427 votes)
- Manolis Kefalogiannis (257,819 votes)
- Anna-Michelle Assimakopoulou (225,211 votes)
- Giorgos Kyrtsos (196,929 votes)
- Thodoris Zagorakis (195,264 votes)

==== Coalition of the Radical Left ====
- Dimitrios Papadimoulis (272,835 votes)
- Elena Kountoura (236,961 votes)
- Kostas Arvanitis (220,816 votes)
- Stelios Kouloglou (198,436 votes)
- Alexis Georgoulis (162,974 votes)
- Petros Kokkalis (140,404 votes)

==== Movement for Change ====
- Nikos Androulakis (180,822 votes)
- Eva Kaili (145,650 votes)

==== Communist Party of Greece ====
- Kostas Papadakis (55,956 votes)
- Lefteris Nikolaou-Alavanos (34,457 votes)

==== Golden Dawn ====
- Ioannis Lagos (130,488 votes)
- Athanasios Konstantinou (50,360 votes)

==== Greek Solution ====
- Emmanouil Fragkos (27,665 votes)
