= List of political parties in Greece =

From the restoration of democracy in 1974 to the 2012 elections, the characteristic Greek political system was predominantly a two-party system. The historically dominant parties were New Democracy and the Panhellenic Socialist Movement (PASOK). Under the electoral system, a party needs to surpass a 3% threshold in the popular vote in order to enter parliament. Until 2023, the largest party used to get a 50-seat bonus (out of 300 seats), ostensibly to ensure elections returned viable governing majorities. The 2023 Greek legislative election was the first and only that was held without the 50-seat bonus rule. Although New Democracy achieved a large percentage of 40.7% and beat the opposition party by 20%, they fell short of forming a majority by 5 seats. The Hellenic Republic had a caretaker prime minister until the June 2023 Greek parliamentary election was held.

== History ==
=== 1915–1967 ===
This period was mainly ruled between the right-wing and the centre.

The major parties that emerged were the People’s Party and the Liberal Party. In 1926, the Communist Party of Greece (KKE), which would later define the left for years, entered the parliament.

From 1950 to 1963, the predominant parties that won all elections in this period were the People’s Party (later Hellenic Rally) and the National Radical Union (ERE) (both from the right).

=== 1974–2009 ===
After the seven-year dictatorship ended, the former leader of ERE, Konstantinos Karamanlis, was called back from exile to form a new government and then created the New Democracy (ND) party. Monarchy was abolished in 1974, making the political parties the sole determinants of politics in Greece.

Further, 1974 saw the establishment of a new party, the Panhellenic Socialist Movement (PASOK) under Andreas Papandreou, representing a socialist ideology. For the decades to come, PASOK and New Democracy were the two parties that dominated Greek politics, creating a formidable two-party system, with the communist party KKE coming third.

The party system during this period was characterised by strong bureaucratic clientelism.

=== 2009–present ===
The 2008 financial crisis and the Greek government-debt crisis had an impact in reshaping the party system that had been stagnant for decades. Confidence in the traditional parties declined; this led to the end of the continuous two-party system and single-party governments. There was new movement towards the creation of coalitions and an increase in the number of parties entering parliament.

The party that rose through the crisis was the Coalition of the Radical Left (SYRIZA). It finished second on the crucial May 2012 legislative elections and later won the 2015 elections. It was the first party from the left wing in Greece's history to win an election.

A new split in the party system ideology (created during the economic crisis) which was evident in the 2012 elections was a pro- or anti-European stance. This resulted in an unprecedented coalition between the major traditional parties New Democracy and PASOK and the minor party DIMAR. Similarly, the coalition that was created after the 2015 elections between SYRIZA, a left-wing party, and ANEL, a populist right party, was based on their common views regarding Europe.

This period of turmoil also saw the rise of the controversial far-right party Golden Dawn. It became a third party in parliament after the 2015 elections.

In 2018, the past major party PASOK merged with other centrist parties and created the Movement of Change (KINAL) formation.

The elections in 2019 saw a return to a single party government with the continuously dominant New Democracy claiming the majority in parliament.

== Parties represented in the current Parliament or European Parliament ==
| Party | Abbr. | Leader | MPs (2023) | MEPs (2024) | Ideology | Political position | Int'l affiliation | European affiliation |
|---|---|---|---|---|---|---|---|---|
| New Democracy; Νέα Δημοκρατία; Néa Dimokratía | ND; ΝΔ | Kyriakos Mitsotakis president | 155 / 300 | 7 / 21 | Liberal conservatism; Christian democracy | Centre-right to right-wing | IDU; CDI | EPP |
| Panhellenic Socialist Movement – Movement For Change; Πανελλήνιο Σοσιαλιστικό Κίνημα – Κίνημα Αλλαγής; Panellinio Sosialistiko Kinima – Kínima Allagís | PASOK–KINAL; ΠΑΣΟΚ – ΚΙΝΑΛ | Nikos Androulakis president | 32 / 300 | 4 / 21 | Social democracy | Centre-left | SI; PA | PES |
| Coalition of the Radical Left; Συνασπισμός Ριζοσπαστικής Αριστεράς; Sinaspismós Rizospastikís Aristerás | SYRIZA; ΣΥΡΙΖΑ | Vacant | 12 / 300 | 2 / 21 | Democratic socialism; Social democracy | Centre-left to left-wing | —N/a | PEL |
| Communist Party of Greece; Κομμουνιστικό Κόμμα Ελλάδας; Kommounistikó Kómma Elládas | KKE | Dimitris Koutsoumpas general secretary | 21 / 300 | 2 / 21 | Communism; Marxism–Leninism | Far-left | IMCWP | ECA |
| New Left; Νέα Αριστερά; Néa Aristerá | NEAR; ΝΕΑΡ | Gabriel Sakellaridis president | 4 / 300 | 0 / 21 | Democratic socialism | Centre-left to left-wing | —N/a | PEL |
| Greek Solution; Ελληνική Λύση; Ellinikí Lýsi | EL; ΕΛ | Kyriakos Velopoulos president | 11 / 300 | 2 / 21 | Ultranationalism; National conservatism; Right-wing populism | Right-wing to far-right | —N/a | ECR |
| Democratic Patriotic Movement – Victory; Δημοκρατικό Πατριωτικό Κίνημα – Νίκη; Dimokratikó Patriotikó Kínima – Níki | NIKI; NIKH | Dimitris Natsios chairman | 8 / 300 | 1 / 21 | National conservatism; Ultraconservatism | Far-right | —N/a | —N/a |
| Course of Freedom; Πλεύση Ελευθερίας; Plefsi Eleftherias | PE; ΠE | Zoe Konstantopoulou president | 5 / 300 | 1 / 21 | Anti-establishment; Left-wing nationalism Left-wing populism | Left-wing to far-left | —N/a | —N/a |
| Voice of Reason; Φωνή Λογικής; Foní Loyikís | FL; ΦΛ | Afroditi Latinopoulou president | 0 / 300 | 1 / 21 | Ultraconservatism; Ultranationalism | Far-right | —N/a | Patriots |
| Democrats – Progressive Centre; Δημοκράτες – Προοδευτικό Κέντρο; Dimokrates Proodeftiko Kentro | | Stefanos Kasselakis president | 4 / 300 | 0 / 21 | Pro-Europeanism | Centre | —N/a | EDP |
| Spartans; Σπαρτιάτες; Spartiátes | S Σ | Vasilis Stigkas president | 2 / 300 | 0 / 21 | Neo-fascism; Ultranationalism | Far-right | —N/a | —N/a |
| National Rally – Patriotic Radical Momentum of Victory; Εθνική Συσπείρωση – Πατριωτική Ριζοσπαστική Ορμή Νίκης; Ethnikí Syspeírosi – Patriotikí Rizospastikí Ormí Níkis | PARON; ΠΑΡΟΝ | Michalis Gavgiotakis president | 2 / 300 | 0 / 21 | Greek nationalism; National conservatism | Far-right | —N/a | —N/a |
| Greek Pulse; Ελληνικός Παλμός; Ellinikos Palmos | EP; ΕΠ | Nikos Papadopoulos chairman | 1 / 300 | 0 / 21 | National conservatism; Ultraconservatism | Far-right | —N/a | —N/a |

== Minor parties ==
| Name | Abbreviation | Position | Ideology | Leader | National affiliation | European affiliation |
|---|---|---|---|---|---|---|
| Agricultural Livestock Party of Greece; Αγροτικό Κτηνοτροφικό Κόμμα Ελλάδος | AKKEL; ΑΚΚΕΛ | Centre | Agrarianism; Agrarian reform | Vakis Tsiompanidis | ANEL (2015); EPAM-AKKEL (2019) | ESN |
| Anticapitalist Left Cooperation for the Overthrow; Αντικαπιταλιστική Αριστερή Συνεργασία για την Ανατροπή | ANTARSYA; ΑΝΤΑΡΣΥΑ | Left-wing to far-left | Socialism; Anti-capitalism | 21 member committee | None | None |
| Assembly of Greeks; Ελλήνων Συνέλευσις | ESY; ΕΣΥ | Far-right | Ultranationalism; Greek nationalism | Artemis Sorras | None | None |
| Christian Democracy; Χριστιανική Δημοκρατία | XD; ΧΔ | Left-wing | Christian socialism Democratic socialism | Giannis Zervos | Political Initiative (since 2023) | None |
| Christian Democratic Party of the Overthrow; Χριστιανοδημοκρατικό Κόμμα Ανατροπής | XPIKA; ΧΡΙΚΑ | Centre-right | Christian democracy Conservatism | Nikos Nikolopoulos | EPAL (2014); ANEL (2015); EK (2019); KELAN (2021) | None |
| Communist Organization of Greece; Κομμουνιστική Οργάνωση Ελλάδας | KOE; ΚΟΕ | Far-left | Communism; Maoism | | Left!–M-L KKE (2000); SYRIZA (2004-2015) | None |
| Communist Party of Greece (Marxist–Leninist); Κομμουνιστικό Κόμμα Ελλάδας (Μαρξιστικό – Λενινιστικό) | KKE(m–l); ΚΚΕ(μ-λ) | Far-left | Marxism–Leninism–Maoism; Anti-revisionism | Grigoris Konstantopoulos | | None |
| Creation; Δημιουργία | | Right-wing | Neoliberalism; Anti-immigration | vacant | None | ALDE |
| Cynical Party of Greece-Diogenis; Κυνικό Κόμμα Ελλάδος-Διογένης | KKE-D; ΚΚΕ-Δ | Big tent | Political satire | Unknown | None | None |
| Democratic National Reform Union; Ένωση Δημοκρατικής Εθνικής Μεταρρύθμισης | EDEM; ΕΔΕΜ | Centre | Liberalism | Apostolos Pontas | PASOK-KINAL (since 2018) | None |
| Democratic Revival; Δημοκρατική Αναγέννηση | DIMAN; ΔΗMAN | Right-wing | Social conservatism Christian democracy | Theodoros Pantoulas | Political Initiative (since 2023) | None |
| Democratic Social Movement; Δημοκρατικό Κοινωνικό Κίνημα | DΙΚΚΙ; ΔHKKI | Left-wing | Social democracy Socialism | Giorgos Boutris | LAE-AA (2016–2019); Alliance of Subversion (2022–2023) | None |
| Democrats; Δημοκρατικοί | Dem; Δημ | Centre | Social liberalism Economic liberalism | Theodoros Polyzoidis | ND | None |
| Ecologist Greens; Οικολόγοι Πράσινοι | OP; ΟΠ | Left-wing | Green politics | Konstantinos Ziavras, Alexandra Datseri | OP–KPE (2014); SYRIZA (2015–2020); OP–Green Unity (since 2023) | EGP, G-EFA |
| Ecologists of Greece; Οικολόγοι Ελλάδας | | Right-wing | Green conservatism | Panagiotis Mantzanas | None | None |
| European Realistic Disobedience Front 25; Μέτωπο Ευρωπαϊκής Ρεαλιστικής Ανυπακοής 25 | MeRA25; ΜέΡΑ25 | Left-wing | Democratic socialism Market socialism | Gianis Varoufakis | None | DiEM25 |
| Fighting Socialist Party of Greece; Αγωνιστικό Σοσιαλιστικό Κόμμα Ελλάδας | ASKE; ΑΣΚΕ | Left-wing | Democratic socialism Left-wing nationalism | | None | None |
| Free Citizens; Ελεύθεροι Πολίτες | | Centre-left | Social democracy | Michalis Nikitakis | None | None |
| Green Movement; Πράσινο Κίνημα | P.K . Π.Κ. | Centre-left | Green politics | Elena Choreva, Kostas Kalogranis | None | Greens/EFA |
| Greens-Ecology; Πράσινοι-Οικολογία | | Centre-left | Green politics | Vaso Nakou, Kostas Papakonstantinou | Kosmos (since 2024) | Greens/EFA |
| Hellenic Left Alignment; Ελληνική Αριστερή Συμπαράταξη | EL.A.S. ΕΛ.Α.Σ. | Centre-left to left-wing | | Alexis Tsipras | None | None |
| Hope for Democracy; Ελπίδα για την Δημοκρατία | | Big Tent | Anti-establishment | Maria Karystianou | None | None |
| I Don't Pay Movement; Κίνημα Δεν Πληρώνω | | Left-wing to Far-left | Socialism; Anti-capitalism | Vasilis Papadopoulos | LAE-AA (2015–2016) PE (2019–2023) | None |
| Kosmos; Κόσμος | | Centre-left | Green politics Political ecology | Petros S. Kokkalis | None | Greens/EFA |
| Marxist-Leninist Communist Party of Greece; Μαρξιστικό-Λενινιστικό Κομμουνιστικό Κόμμα Ελλάδας | M-L KKE; Μ-Λ ΚΚΕ | Far-left | Marxism–Leninism-Maoism; Anti-revisionism | Antonis Papadopoulos | | None |
| Movement 21; Κίνημα 21 | Κ21 | Far-right | Ultranationalism; Greek nationalism | Zois Mpechlis | None | None |
| Movement of Democratic Socialists; Κίνημα Δημοκρατών Σοσιαλιστών | KIDISO; ΚΙΔΗΣΟ | Centre-left | Social democracy | George Papandreou | PASOK-KINAL | None |
| National Front; Εθνικό Mέτωπο | EM; ΕΜ | Far-right | Ultranationalism; Greek nationalism | Emmanouil Konstas | None | None |
| National Independence Movement; Κίνημα Εθνικής Ανεξαρτησίας | KEAN | Far-right | Ultranationalism; Greek nationalism | Christos Tsiartas | None | None |
| National Party - Greeks; Εθνικό Kόμμα - Έλληνες | GREEKS; ΕΛΛΗΝΕΣ | Far-right | National conservatism Anti-immigration | Dimitris Chatziliadis | None | None |
| National Unity Association; Σύνδεσμος Εθνικής Ενότητας | SEE; ΣΕΕ | Right-wing | Patriotism; National conservatism | Nikos Alikakos | None | None |
| Organization for the Reconstruction of the Communist Party of Greece; Οργάνωση για την Ανασυγκρότηση του Κομουνιστικού Κόμματος Ελλάδας | OAKKE; ΟΑΚΚΕ | Far-left | Communism | Elias Zafiropoulos | None | None |
| Organisation of Internationalist Communists of Greece; Οργάνωση Κομμουνιστών Διεθνιστών Ελλάδας | OKDE; ΟΚΔΕ | Far-left | Communism; Trotskyism | committee | ANTARSYA (2009) | None |
| Panathinaikos Movement; Παναθηναικό Κίνημα | PAN.KI. ΠΑN.KI. | Centre | Single-issue politics (Note: PANKI was founded with the sole aim of promoting the construction of the new Panathinaikos FC stadium.) | Ioannis Alevizos | None | None |
| Panhellenic Citizen Chariot; Πανελλήνιο Άρμα Πολιτών | PARP; ΠΑΡΠ | Centre-left | Social Democracy; Populism; Euroscepticism | Giannis Dimaras | ANEL (2012–2014); EK (2019); KELAN (2021) | None |
| Party of Friendship, Equality and Peace; Κόμμα Ισότητας, Ειρήνης και Φιλίας; Dostluk-Eşitlik-Barış Partisi | KIEF; ΚΙΕΦ; DEBP | Centre | Turkish minority interests | Tsigdem Asafoglou | None | None |
| Party of Greek Hunters-Fishermen; Κόμμα Ελλήνων Κυνηγών-Αλιέων | KEKA; ΚΕΚΑ | Centre-right | Hunter interests Conservatism | Michalis Zougris | None | None |
| Patriots; Πατριώτες | P - PE; Π - ΠΕ | Far-right | National conservatism Anti-immigration | Prodromos Emfietzoglou | None | None |
| Pirate Party of Greece; Κόμμα Πειρατών Ελλάδας | PPGR; ΠΕΙΡ | Centre-left to Left-wing | Pirate politics Freedom of information Direct democracy Anti-corruption; Secularism | Collective leadership (management board) | OP–KPE (2014); Prasino+Mov (2022-2023) | None |
| Popular Greek Patriotic Union; Λαϊκή Ελληνική Πατριωτική Ένωση | LE.P.EN. ΛΕ.Π.ΕΝ. | Far-right | Greek nationalism Anti-immigration | Christos Rigas | EP (2023) | APF |
| Popular Orthodox Rally; Λαϊκός Ορθόδοξος Συναγερμός | LA.O.S; ΛΑ.Ο.Σ | Far-right | Greek nationalism Conservatism | Filippos Kampouris | None | MELD |
| Popular Unions of Bipartisan Social Groups; Λαϊκές Ενώσεις Υπερκομματικών Κοινωνικών Ομάδων | L.E.F.K.O. Λ.Ε.Υ.Κ.Ο. | Centre-right to Center-left | Greek nationalism Euroscepticism | Konstantinos Dalios | ANEL (2015) | None |
| Popular Unity-Insubordinate Left; Λαϊκή Ενότητα-Ανυπότακτη Αριστερά | LAE-AA; ΛΑΕ-AA | Left-wing to far-left | Democratic socialism Left-wing populism | Dimitris Stratoulis, Marianna Tsixli | None | None |
| Rainbow; Ουράνιο Τόξο; Виножито | | Centre | Slavic minority rights | Collective leadership | None | EFA |
| Revolutionary Communist Movement of Greece; Επαναστατικό Κομμουνιστικό Κίνημα Ελλάδος | EKKE; ΕΚΚΕ | Far left | Communism; Maoism | Committee | ANTARSYA | None |
| Socialist Workers' Party; Σοσιαλιστικό Εργατικό Κόμμα | SEK; ΣΕΚ | Far-left | Communism; Socialism; Trotskyism | Committee | ANTARSYA | None |
| Society First; Η Κοινωνία Πρώτα | H.K.P; Η.Κ.Π | Left wing | Democratic socialism Socialism | Stefanos Katsaras | SYRIZA | None |
| Society of Values; Κοινωνία Αξιών | | Centre | Liberalism | Stelios Fenekos | The River (2019); KA–FISY | None |
| Smoking Groups for Art and Visual Art; Καπνιστικές Ομάδες για την Τέχνη και την Εικαστική Συγκρότηση | K.O.T.E.S. Κ.Ο.Τ.Ε.Σ. | Single-issue | Legalization of smoking | Nikos Louvros | SYRIZA (2019); KKE | None |
| Union of Centrists; Ένωση Κεντρώων | E.K. Ε.Κ. | Centre | Venizelism; National liberalism | vacant | None | EDP |
| Union of the Democratic Centre; Ένωση Δημοκρατικού Κέντρου | E.ΔΗ.K. E.DH.K. | Centre | Venizelism; Liberalism | Stavros Karampelas | DIKKI (2000); DA (2009); SYRIZA (2012-2015) | None |
| United Popular Front; Ενιαίο Παλλαϊκό Μέτωπο | EPAM; ΕΠΑΜ | Big tent | Patriotism; Greek nationalism | Dimitris Kazakis | Nο (2012); KELAN (2021); Alliance of Subversion (2022–2023) | None |
| Volt Greece; Βολτ Ελλάδας | VOLT; ΒΟΛΤ | Centre | Social liberalism Progressivism | Evangelos Liaras, Electra Rome Dochtsi | Prasino+Mov (2022–2023); Kosmos (2024) | Volt |
| Workers Revolutionary Party; Εργατικό Επαναστατικό Κόμμα | EEK; ΕΕΚ | Far-left | Communism; Trotskyism | Savas Matsas | None | None |

== Defunct parties ==
=== Parties during the reign of King Otto (1833–1862) ===
- English Party (Greek: Αγγλικό Κόμμα) (liberal, pro-English) (1824–1863)
- French Party (Greek: Γαλλικό Κόμμα) (liberal, pro-French) (1824–1863)
- Russian Party (Greek: Ρώσικο Κόμμα) (conservative, pro-Russian) (1825–1863)
- Party of Radicals (Greek: Κόμμα των Ριζοσπαστών) (radical, pro-union) (1848–1864) in the United States of the Ionian Islands

=== Parties during the reign of King George I (1863–1913) ===
- Liberal Party (Greek: Κόμμα Φιλελευθέρων) (Liberal) (1910–1961)
- National Party (Greek: Κόμμα Εθνικόφρονων, K.E.) – Komma Ethnikofronon, KE (conservative, nationalist) (1865–1909)
- Modernist Party (Greek: Νεωτεριστικόν Κομμα, Ν.Κ.) – Neoteristikon Komma, ΝΚ (Liberal, Liberal Nationalist) (1875–1910)

=== Parties during the reign of King Constantine I - Alexander – George II (1913–1924) ===
- Freethinkers' Party (Greek: Κόμμα των Ελευθερόφρονων K.E.) – Komma Eleftherofronon (Nationalist, Royalist) (1922–1936)
- Liberal Party (Greek: Κόμμα Φιλελευθέρων) (Liberal, Liberal Nationalist) (1910–1961)
- People's Party (Greek: Λαϊκόν Κόμμα Λ.Κ.) – Laiko Komma, LK (Conservative, Royalist) (1920–1958)

=== Parties during the Second Hellenic Republic (1924–1935) ===
- Agrarian Party (Greek: Άγροτικό Κόμμα, A.K.) – Agrotikon Komma, AK (1926–1956)
- Conservative Democratic Party (Greek: Συντιριτικό Δημοκρατικόν Κόμμα, Σ.Δ.Κ.) – Syntiritiko Demokratikon Komma, SDK (1932–1936)
- Democratic Union (Greek: Δημοκρατική Ένωσις, Δ.E.) – Demokratiki Enosis (Liberal) (1926–?)
- Democratic Socialist Party of Greece (Greek: Δημοκρατικό Σοσιαλιστικό Κόμμα Ελλάδος, ΔΣΚ) – Demokratiko Sosialistiko Komma Ellados, DSK (Democratic Socialist) (1935–1950)
- Farmers' and Workers' Party (Greek: Άγροτικόν και Έργατικόν Κόμμα, Α.Ε.Κ.) – Agrotikon kai Ergatikon Komma/Agrotergatiko Komma, AEK (Rural radical) (1932–1936)
- General People's Radical Union (Greek: Γενική Λαïκή Ριζοσπαστική Ένωση, Γ.Λ.Ρ.Ε) – Geniki Laiki Rizospastiki Enosis, GLRE (1932–1936)
- Liberal Party (Greek: Κόμμα Φιλελευθέρων) – Komma Fileleutheron (Liberal, Liberal Nationalist) (1910–1961)
- Greek National Socialist Party (Greek: Ελληνικό Εθνικό Σοσιαλιστικό Κόμμα) – Elliniko Ethniko Sosialistiko Komma (National Socialist) (1932)
- Jewish Political Union (Greek: Εβραϊκή Πολιτική Ένωση) – Evraiki Politiki Enosi (1926–1932)
- Macedonian Union (Greek: Μακεδονική Ένωση) – Makedoniki Enosi (Conservative) (1935)
- National Radical Party (Greek: Εθνική Ριζοσπαστική Κόμμα, E.Ρ.K.) – Ethnikon Rizospastikon Komma, ERK (Conservative) (1932–1936)
- National Unionist Party (Greek: Εθνικόν Ενωτικόν Κόμμα, Ε.Ε.Κ.) – Ethnikon Enotikon Komma, EEK (1935–1950)
- People's Party (Greek: Λαϊκόν Κόμμα, Λ.Κ.) – Laiko Komma, LK (Conservative, Royalist) (1920–1958)
- Progressive Party (Greek: Προοδευτικόν Κόμμα, Π.Κ.) – Proodeftikon Komma, PK (1928–1964, 1981)
- Refugees' Liberal Party (Greek: Φιλελευθέρων Προσφιγικόν Κόμμα, Φ.Π.Κ.) – Fileleftheron Prosfijikon Komma, FPK (1926–?)
- Socialist Party of Greece (Greek: Σοσιαλιστικό Κόμμα Ελλάδας, ΣΚΕ) – Socialistikó Kómma Elládas, SKE (Socialist, Svolist) (1920–1953)
- Union of Royalists (Greek: Ένωσις Βασιλικών, EB) – Enosis Vasilikon (Monarchist-Conservative) (1935)

=== Parties during the restoration of King George II (1936–1946) ===
- Agrarian Party (Greek: Άγροτικό Κόμμα, A.K.) – Agrotikon Komma, AK (1926–1956)
- Conservative Democratic Party (Greek: Συντιριτικό Δημοκρατικόν Κόμμα, Σ.Δ.Κ.) – Syntiritiko Demokratikon Komma, SDK (1932–1936)
- Democratic Socialist Party of Greece (Greek: Δημοκρατικό Σοσιαλιστικό Κόμμα Ελλάδος, ΔΣΚ) – Demokratiko Sosialistiko Komma Ellados, DSK (Democratic Socialist) (1935–1950)
- Democratic Union (Greek: Δημοκρατική Ένωσις, Δ.E.) – Demokratiki Enosis (Liberal) (1926–?)
- Farmers' and Workers' Party (Greek: Άγροτικόν και Έργατικόν Κόμμα, Α.Ε.Κ.) – Agrotikon kai Ergatikon Komma/Agrotergatiko Komma, AEK (Rural radical) (1932–1936)
- General People's Radical Union (Greek: Γενική Λαïκή Ριζοσπαστική Ένωση, Γ.Λ.Ρ.Ε) – Geniki Laiki Rizospastiki Enosis, GLRE (??) (1932–1936)
- Liberal Party (Greek: Κόμμα Φιλελευθέρων) – Komma Fileleutheron (Liberal, Liberal Nationalist) (1910–1961)
- National Party of Greece (Greek: Εθνικόν Κόμμα 'Ελλάδος, E.Κ.E.) – Ethnikon Komma Ellados, E.K.E. (Monarchist, Conservative) (1946–1967)
- National People's Party (Greek: Εθνικόν Λαϊκόν Κόμμα, E.Λ.Κ.) – Ethniko Laiko Komma, E.L.K. (1936)
- National Political Union (Greek: Εθνική Πολιτική Ένωσις, Ε.Π.Ε.) – Ethniki Politiki Enosis, E.P.E. (Liberal) (1946)
- National Radical Party (Greek: Εθνική Ριζοσπαστική Κόμμα, E.Ρ.K.) – Ethnikon Rizospastikon Komma, ERK (Conservative) (1932–1936)
- National Unionist Party (Greek: Εθνικόν Ενωτικόν Κόμμα, Ε.Ε.Κ.)– Ethnikon Enotikon Komma, EEK (1935–1950)
- People's Party (Greek: Λαϊκόν Κόμμα, Λ.Κ.) – Laiko Komma, LK (Conservative, Royalist) (1920–1958)
- Progressive Party (Greek: Προοδευτικόν Κόμμα, Π.Κ.) – Proodeftikon Komma, PK (1928–1964, 1981)
- Reform Party (Greek: Μεταρρυθμιστικόν Κόμμα, M.K.) – Metarrythmistikon Komma, MK (1936)
- Union of Agrarian Parties (Greek: Ένωσις Άγροτικόν Κομμάτων, Ε.Α.Κ.) – Enosis Agrotikon Kommaton, EAK (Agrarian) (1946)
- Union of the Nationally Minded (Greek: Ένωσις Εθνικοφρόνων, Ε.Ε.) – Enosis Ethnikofronon, ΕΕ (Monarchist, Conservative) (1946)
- United Order of Patriot-Thinkers (Greek: Ηνωμένη Παράταξις Εθνικοφρόνων, Η.Π.Ε.) – Inomeni Parataxis Ethnikofronon, I.P.E. (Conservative) (1946)

=== Parties during the reigns of Kings Paul and Constantine II (1946–1973) ===
- 4th of August Party (Greek: Κόμμα 4ης Αυγούστου) – Kómma 4is Avgoústou, Κ4Α (Nationalist) (1965–1977)
- Center Union (Greek: Ένωση Κέντρου) – Enosi Kentrou, E.K. (Liberal) (1961–1967)
- Christian Democracy (Greek: Χριστιανική Δημοκρατία) – Christianikē Dēmokratia (socialist) (1963)
- Communist Party of Greece (Interior) (Greek: Κομμουνιστικό Κόμμα Ελλάδας Εσωτερικού) – KKE Esoterikou (Eurocommunism) (1968–1986)
- Democratic Socialist Party of Greece (Greek: Δημοκρατικό Σοσιαλιστικό Κόμμα Ελλάδος, ΔΣΚ) – Demokratiko Sosialistiko Komma Ellados, DSK (Democratic Socialist) (1935–1950)
- Greek Rally (Greek: Ελληνικός Συναγερμός, Ε.Σ.) – Ellinikos Synagermos, E.S. (Conservative, Royalist) (1951–1956)
- Politically Independent Alignment (Greek: Πολιτική Ανεξάρτητός Παράταξις, Π.Α.Π.) – Politiki Anexartitos Parataxis, PAP (Metaxist) (1950–?)
- Left Liberals (Greek: Αριστεροί Φιλελεύθεροι, Α.Φ.) – Aristeroi Fileleutheroi, AF (communist) (1950–?)
- Liberal Democratic Center (Greek: Φιλελεύθερον Δημοκρατικόν Κέντρον, Φ.Δ.Κ.) – Filelefthero Dimokratiko Kentro, FDK (Liberal) (1965–1966)
- Liberal Democratic Union (Greek: Φιλελεύθερη Δημοκρατική Ένωση, Φ.Δ.Ε.) (1956–1957)
- Liberal Party (Greek: Κόμμα Φιλελευθέρων) (Liberal, Liberal Nationalist) (1910–1961)
- Movement for Democracy and Socialism (Greek: Κίνημα Δημοκρατίας και Σοσιαλισμού) – (socialist) (1963)
- National Party of Greece (Greek: Εθνικόν Κόμμα 'Ελλάδος, E.Κ.E.) – Ethnikon Komma Ellados, E.K.E. (Monarchist-Conservative) (1946–1967)
- National Progressive Center Union (Greek: Εθνική Προοδευτική Ένωσις Κέντρου, E.Π.Ε.Κ.) – Ethniki Proodeutiki Enosi Kentrou, EPEK (1952)
- National Progressive Party (Greek: Δημοκρατικό Προοδευτικό Κόμμα, Δ.Π.Κ.) – Dimokratiko Proodeutiko Komma, DPK (1950–?)
- National Radical Union (Greek: Εθνική Ριζοσπαστική Ένωσις, E.Ρ.E.) – Ethniki Rizospastiki Enosis, E.R.E. (Conservative, Royalist) (1955–1967)
- New Party (Greek: Νέο Κόμμα, N.K.) – Neo Komma, NK (conservative) (1947–1951)
- Organisation of Marxists–Leninists of Greece (1964–1976)
- Pandemocratic Agrarian Front (Greek: Πανδημοκρατικόν Αγροτικόν Μέτωπον) – Pandimokratikon Agrotikon Metopon (Socialist) (1961)
- Party of Christian Democracy (1956)
- Party of I. Sofianopoulos (Greek: Κόμμα του Ι. Σοφιανόπουλου) – Komma tou I. Sofianopoulou (communist) (1950–?)
- Party of Progressive Liberals (Greek: Κόμμα των Προοδευτικών Φιλελευθέρων) – Komma ton Prodethikon Fileleutheron (liberal) (1950–?)
- People's Social Party (Greek: Λαϊκόν Κοινωνικόν Κόμμα, Λ.Κ.Κ.) – Laikon Koinonikon Komma, LKK (1955)
- Progressive Party (Greek: Προοδευτικόν Κόμμα, Π.Κ.) – Proodeftikon Komma, PK (1928–1964, 1981)
- Progressive Rural Democratic Union (1958)
- Rally of Farmers and Workers (Parataxis Agroton kai Ergazomenon) – ?? (Agrarian) (1951–1952)
- Socialist Party-Democratic Popular Union (Greek: Σοσιαλιστικό Κόμμα-Ένωση Λαïκής Δημοκρατίας, Σ.Κ.-Ε.Λ.Δ.) – Sosialistiko Komma-Enosi Laikis Dimokratias, SK-ELD (Socialist) (1950–1952)
- Union of the People's Party (1958)
- United Democratic Left (Greek: Ενιαία Δημοκρατική Αριστερά, Ε.Δ.Α. – Eniaia Dimokratiki Aristera, EDA (Communist) (1951–1977)

=== Parties during the Third Hellenic Republic (1974–present) ===
- Centre Union - New Forces (Greek: Ένωσις Κέντρου-Νέες Δυνάμεις) – Enosi Kentrou-Nees Dynameis (Social Democratic, Liberal) (1974–1977)
- Coalition of Left, of Movements and Ecology (Greek: Συνασπισμός της Αριστεράς,των Κινημάτων και της Οικολογίας, ΣΥΝ.) – Synaspismos tis Aristeras, ton Kinimaton kai tis Oikologias, SYN (Eurocommunism, Democratic socialism) (1991–2013)
- Democratic Alignment (Greek: Δημοκρατική Παράταξη, Δ.Π.) – Dimokratiki Parataxi, DP (1977)
- Democratic Alliance (Greek: Δημοκρατική Συμμαχία, ΔΗ.ΣΥ.) – Dimokratiki Symmahia, DS (Centrist, Neoliberal) (2010–2012)
- Democratic Left (Greek: Δημοκρατική Αριστερά, ΔΗΜ.ΑΡ.) – Dimokratiki Aristera, DIM.AR. (Social Democratic, Democratic Socialist) (2010–2022)
- Democratic Regional Union (Greek: Δημοκρατική Περφιφερειακή Ένωση) – Dimokratiki Perifereiaki Enosi (Social democracy, regionalism) (2000-2004)
- Democratic Renewal (Greek: Δημοκρατική Ανανέωση, DH.ANA) – Dimokratiki Ananeosi, DIANA (Conservative) (1985–1994)
- Democratic Responsibility (Greek: Δημοκρατική Ευθύνη, DHM.E. – Dimokratiki Efthini, DE) (Patriotism, Social liberalism, Economic Liberalism, Pro-Europeanism, Syncretic politics) (2016–2022)
- Democrats (Greek: Δημοκράτες, romanized: Dimokrátes) (Liberalism, Pro-europeanism) (2024–2025)
- Drassi (Greek: Δράση) (Liberalism, Classical liberalism, Postnationalism, Decentralization, Economic liberalism) (2009–2019)
- Drachmi Greek Democratic Movement Five Stars (Patriotic Socialism, Eurosceptic, Single-issue politics, Populism) (2013–2015)
- Fate (Greek: Πεπρωμένο) – Pepromeno (Turkish minority interests) (1989-1993)
- Free People (Greek: Ελεύθεροι Άνθρωποι or Κίνημα Ελευθέρων Ανθρώπων, Κ.ΕΛ.ΑΝ.) (Populism, National conservatism, Euroscepticism) (2021–2023)
- Greece, Another Path (Greek: Ελλάδα, ο άλλος δρόμος) (National conservatism, Euroscepticism) (2017-2023)
- Greek Ecologists (Greek: Έλληνες Οικολόγοι, romanized: Ellines Oikologoi), (ecologism, political satire, progressivism) (1986–2023)
- Greek Left (Greek: Ελληνική Αριστερά) (Eurocommunism, Radicalism, Democratic Socialism) (1987–1992)
- Greek Radical Movement (Greek: Ελληνικό Ριζοσπαστικό Κίνημα) – Elliniko Rizospastiko Kinima (Social democracy, Radicalism) (1989-1992)
- Greek Unity (Greek: Ελληνική Ενότητα) – Elliniki Enotita (Nationalism) (1990-2009)
- Greens – Solidarity (Greek: Πράσινοι - Αλληλεγγύη, romanized: Prasinoi - Allilengii) (green politics, ecologism) (2014-2024)
- Hellenic Front (Greek: Ελληνικό Μέτωπο) – Elliniko Metopo (Nationalist, Rightist) (1994–2004)
- Hellenic Women's Political Party (Greek: Κόμμα Ελληνίδων Γυναικών) – Komma Ellinidon Ginaikon (Feminist) (?–?)
- Independent Greeks (Greek: Ανεξάρτητοι Έλληνες) (National conservatism, Social conservatism, Euroscepticism) (2012–2020)
- Left Radical Movement (Greek: Αριστερή Ριζοσπαστική Κίνηση) – Aristeri Rizospastiki Kinisi, A.R.K. (Socialism) (2015–2021)
- Left Struggle (Greek: Μαχόμενη Αριστερά) – Maxomeni Aristera (Communism, Anti-capitalism) (1993-1999)
- Liberal Alliance (Greek: Φιλελεύθερη Συμμαχία) –, FI.SY), Fileleftheri Summaxia, FS (Neoliberalism, Progressivism) (2007-2023)
- Liberal Democratic Union-Socialist Party (Greek: Φιλελεύθερη Δημοκρατική Ένωση-Σοσιαλιστικό Κόμμα, Φ.Δ.Ε.-Σ.Κ.) (1974)
- Liberal Party (Κόμμα Φιλελευθέρων) (1980–2012)
- The Liberals (Greek: Οι Φιλελεύθεροι) – Oi Fileleftheroi (Liberal) (1999–2004)
- Movement of Free Citizens (Greek: Κίνημα Ελευθέρων Πολιτών, Κ.Ε.Π.) – Kinima Eleftheron Politon, K.E.P. (Liberal, Liberal Conservative) (2001–2002)
- Movement for a United Communist Party of Greece (Greek: Κίνηση για Ενιαίο, ΚΚΕ) (Communist) (1993–1996)
- National Alignment (Greek: Εθνική Παράταξις, Ε.Π.)- Ethniki Parataxis, E.P. (Nationalist, Royalist) (1977–1981)
- National Creation (Greek: Εθνική Δημιουργία- Ethniki Dhmiourgia, (Rightist, Nationalist) (2022–2023)
- National Democratic Union (Greek: Εθνική Δημοκρατική Ένωσις) – Ethniki Dimokratiki Enosis (Rightist) (1974)
- National Hope (Greek: Eθνική Eλπίδα, ΕΘ.ΕΛ.) – Ethniki Elpida, ETH.EL. (Far Right, Greek Nationalism, Monarchism) (2010–2019)
- National Political Union (Greek: Εθνική Πολιτική Ένωσις, Ε.Π.ΕΝ.) – Ethniki Politiki Enosis, E.P.EN. (Rightist, Nationalist) (1984–1996)
- National Popular Consciousness (Greek: Eθνική Λαϊκή Συνείδηση, Ε.ΛΑ.ΣΥΝ.) - Ethniki Laiki Syneidisi, E.LA.SYN. (Far Right, Greek Nationalism, Anti - immigration, National Conservatism, Euroscepticism) (2019-2023)
- New Left Current (Greek: Νέο Αριστερό Ρεύμα (για την Κομμουνιστική Απελευθέρωση), ΝΑΡ; Neo Aristero Revma, NAR) (Communism, Anti-capitalism) (1990–2025)
- New Reformist Radical Reconstruction (Greek: Νέα Μεταρρυθμιστική Ριζοσπαστική Ανασυγκρότηση, ΝΕΑ ΜΕ.Ρ.Α.) (National Conservative, Liberal Conservative) (2014–2015)
- New Right (Greek: Νέα Δεξιά Nea Dexia) (National conservatism) (2016–2023)
- Organisation of Communists Marxists-Leninists of Greece (Greek: Οργάνωση Κομμουνιστών Μαρξιστών-Λενινιστών Ελλάδας, ΟΚΜΛΕ) (Communist, Maoist) (1982–1993)
- Panhellenic Macedonian Front (Greek: Πανελλήνιο Μακεδονικό Μέτωπο, ΠΑ.Μ.ΜΕ.) (2009)
- Party of Democratic Socialism (Greek: Κόμμα του Δημοκρατικού Σοσιαλισμού, ΚΟΔΗΣΟ) – Komma tou Dimokratikou Sosialismou, KODISO (social democratic, democratic socialist) (1979–1989)
- Party of Hellenism (Greek: Κόμμα Ελληνισμού) – Komma Ellinismou (Nationalist, Populist) (1984–2004)
- Party of New Liberals (Greek: Kόμμα των Nεοφιλελευθέρων, K.N.) – Komma ton Neofileftheron, KN (Liberal, Liberal Conservative) (1977–1978)
- Patriotic Alliance (Greek: Πατριωτική Συμμαχία) – Patriotiki Symmachia, PATRI.S. (Nationalist, Far Right) (2004–2007)
- Patriotic Force for Change (Greek: Πατριωτική Δύναμη Αλλαγής, Patriotikí Dýnami Allagís) (National conservatism, Social conservatism, Economic liberalism, Right-wing populism, Anti-immigration) (2022–2023)
- Peasants and Workers Party (Greek: Κόμμα Αγροτών και Εργαζομένων) - KAE (Agrarian Socialism) (1981)
- Peoples Democratic Unity – LDE (1977)
- Political Spring (Greek: Πολιτική Άνοιξη) – POL.AN (Conservative, Nationalist) (1993–2004)
- Prasino+Mov (Greek: Πράσινο & Μωβ, lit. 'Green & Purple') (Green politics) (2022–2023)
- Progress and Left Forces Alliance (Greek: Συμμαχία Προοδευτικών και Αριστερών Δυνάμεων) (Democratic socialism, Christian socialism, Eurocommunism, Radicalism) (1977–1981)
- Progressive Party (Greek: Προοδευτικόν Κόμμα, Π.Κ.) – Proodeftikon Komma, PK (1928–1964, 1981)
- Front Line (Greek: Πρώτη Γραμμή) – Proti Grammi (Nationalist) (1999–2000)
- Radical Left Front (Greek: Μέτωπο Ριζοσπαστικής Αριστεράς) – ME.R.A. (Radical Left) (1999–2009)
- Radical Movement of Social Democratic Alliance (Greek: Ριζοσπαστική Κίνηση Σοσιαλδημοκρατικής Συμμαχίας) – RIKSSY (Social democracy) (2012–2013)
- Radical National Rally (Greek: Ριζοσπαστικός Εθνικός Συναγερμός) – Rizospastikós Ethnikós Synagermós, RIZ.ES (National conservatism) (2015-2018)
- Renewing Communist Ecological Left (Greek: Ανανεωτική Κομμουνιστική Οικολογική Αριστερά) – AKOA (Eurocommunism, environmentalism) (1987–2013)
- Reformers for Democracy and Development (Μεταρρυθμιστές της Αριστεράς για τη Δημοκρατία και την Ανάπτυξη) (2014–2019)
- Republican Union (Greek: Δημοκρατική Ένωσις, Δ.Ε.) – Dimokratiki Enosis, DE
- Revolutionary Communist Party of Greece (Greek: Επαναστατικό Κουμουνιστικό Κόμμα 'Ελλάδος) – Epanastatiko Koumounistiko Komma Ellados, EKKE (Communist) (1974–?)
- Social Agreement (Κοινωνική Συμφωνία) (Democratic socialism, Social democracy) (2012-2019)
- Society – Political Party of the Successors of Kapodistrias (Greek: Κοινωνία - Πολιτική παράταξη συνεχιστών του Καποδίστρια) – Koinonía - Politikí parátaxi synechistón tou Kapodístria, KOINONIA (kapodistrism) (2008-2020)
- Teleia (Greek: Τελεία) – Teleia (Liberalism) (2014–2017)
- The River (Greek: Το Ποτάμι) – To Potami (Social Liberalism, Social democracy) (2014–2019)
- Trust (Greek: Εμπιστοσύνη) – Empistosini (Turkish minority interests) (1985-1993)
- Union for the Homeland and the People (Greek: Ένωση για την Πατρίδα και τον Λαό) – Enosi gia tin Patrida kai ton Lao, EPAL (Christian Democracy) (2014–2015)
- Unitary Front (Greek: Ενωτική Κίνηση) – Enotiki Kinisi, (Democratic socialism) (2011–2013)
- United Democratic Left (Greek: Ενιαία Δημοκρατική Αριστερά) – Eniaia Dimokratiki Aristera (Democratic socialism, Communism, Pacifism) (1951–1977)
- United Left (Greek: Ενωμένη Αριστερά) (Communism, Democratic socialism, Eurocommunism) (1974–1977)
- United Nationalist Movement (Greek: Ενιαίο Εθνικιστικό Κίνημα, ΕΝ.Ε.Κ.) – Eniaio Ethnikistiko Kinima, ENEK (Extreme Right, Nationalist) (1979–1989)
- United Socialist Alignment of Greece (Greek: Ενιαία Σοσιαλιστική Παράταξη Ελλάδας, Ε.Σ.Π.Ε.) – Eniaia Sosialistiki Parataxi Elladas (Socialist) (1984–1989)
- Golden Dawn (Greek: Λαϊκός Σύνδεσμος – Χρυσή Αυγή) – Laïkós Sýndesmos – Chrysí Avgí (Ultranationalism) (1983–)

== See also ==
- Politics of Greece
- Elections in Greece
