= Meganisi =

Greek island in the Ionian Sea

Meganisi Μεγανήσι
- Municipality
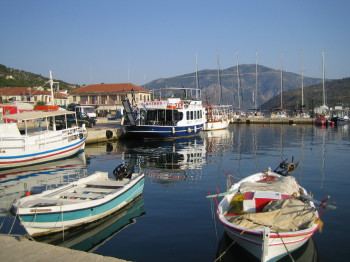
- Vathy Harbor

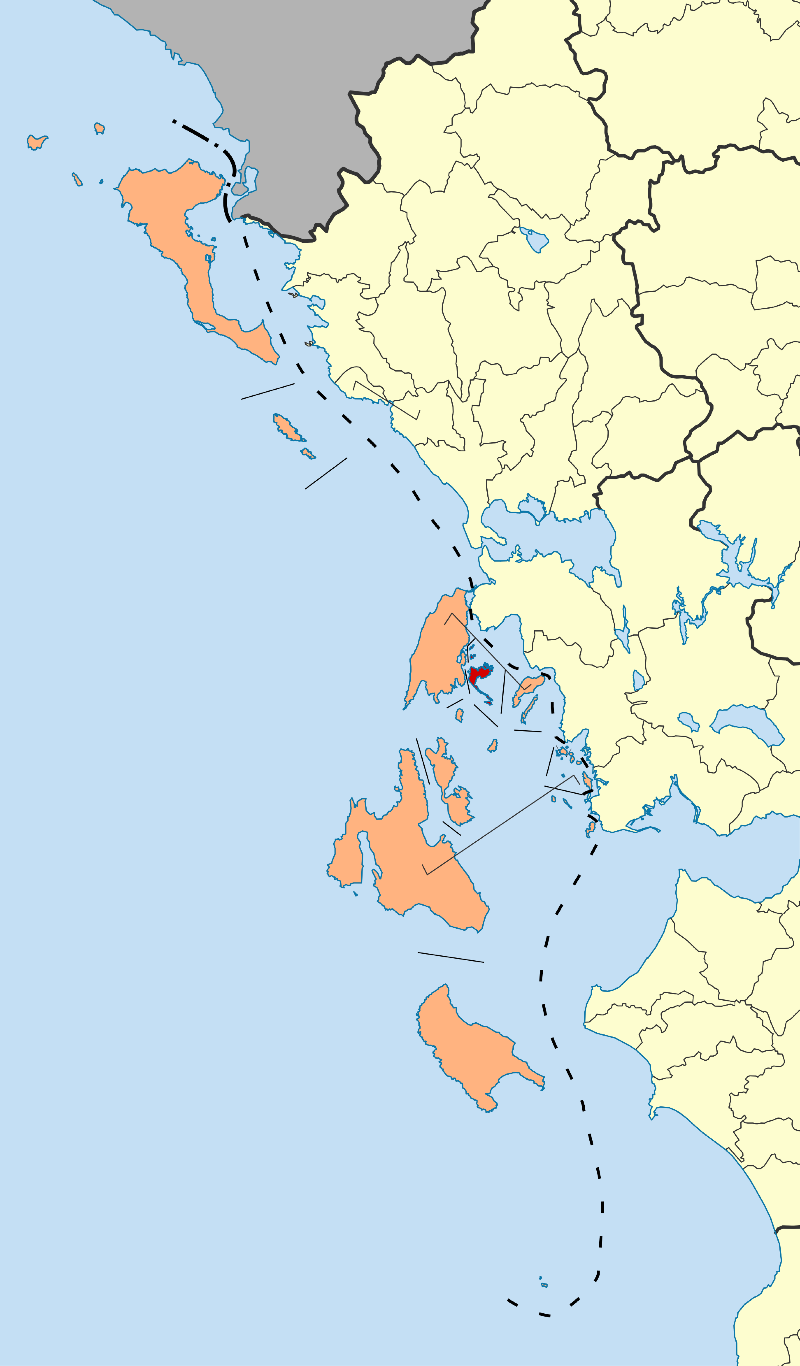

- Location within Greece
- Coordinates: 38°40′N 20°47′E
- Country: Greece
- Administrative region: Ionian Islands
- Regional unit: Lefkada
- Seat: Katomeri

Area
  - Municipality: 22.356 km^{2} (8.632 sq mi)
- Highest elevation: 309 m (1,014 ft)
- Lowest elevation: 0 m (0 ft)

Population (2021)
  - Municipality: 926
  - Density: 41.4/km^{2} (107/sq mi)
- Time zone: UTC+2 (EET)
  - Summer (DST): UTC+3 (EEST)
- Postal code: 310 83
- Area code: 26450
- Vehicle registration: EY
- Website: meganisi.gov.gr

Meganisi (Greek: Μεγανήσι, literally "big island") is a Greek island and municipality immediately to the east-southeast of the island of Lefkada. The municipality includes the offshore islands of Skorpios (pop. 2 persons) and Sparti. The municipality has an area of 22.356 km^{2}.

The island has three villages: the central village of Katomeri and the ports of Vathy and Spartochori. There is also a harbour at Atheni Bay used mainly by fishing boats. Meganisi is connected with Lefkada by a car ferry service from Vathy and Spartochori. Meganisi has a school, a lyceum (middle school), an ATM, churches and a few squares (plateies). The island has no secondary school, so pupils attend the nearby school in Nydri, on Lefkada.

Some researchers, including Wilhelm Dörpfeld, believe that Meganisi was the Homeric island of Krocylea, which was part of Odysseus' kingdom.

== Municipality ==
=== Municipal districts ===
- Katomeri
- Spartochori
- Vathy

=== Islands ===
- Skorpios - private island
- Sparti

== Historical population ==
Year	Island population
1981	1,149
1991	1,246
2001	1,092
2011	1,041
2021	926

== Gallery ==
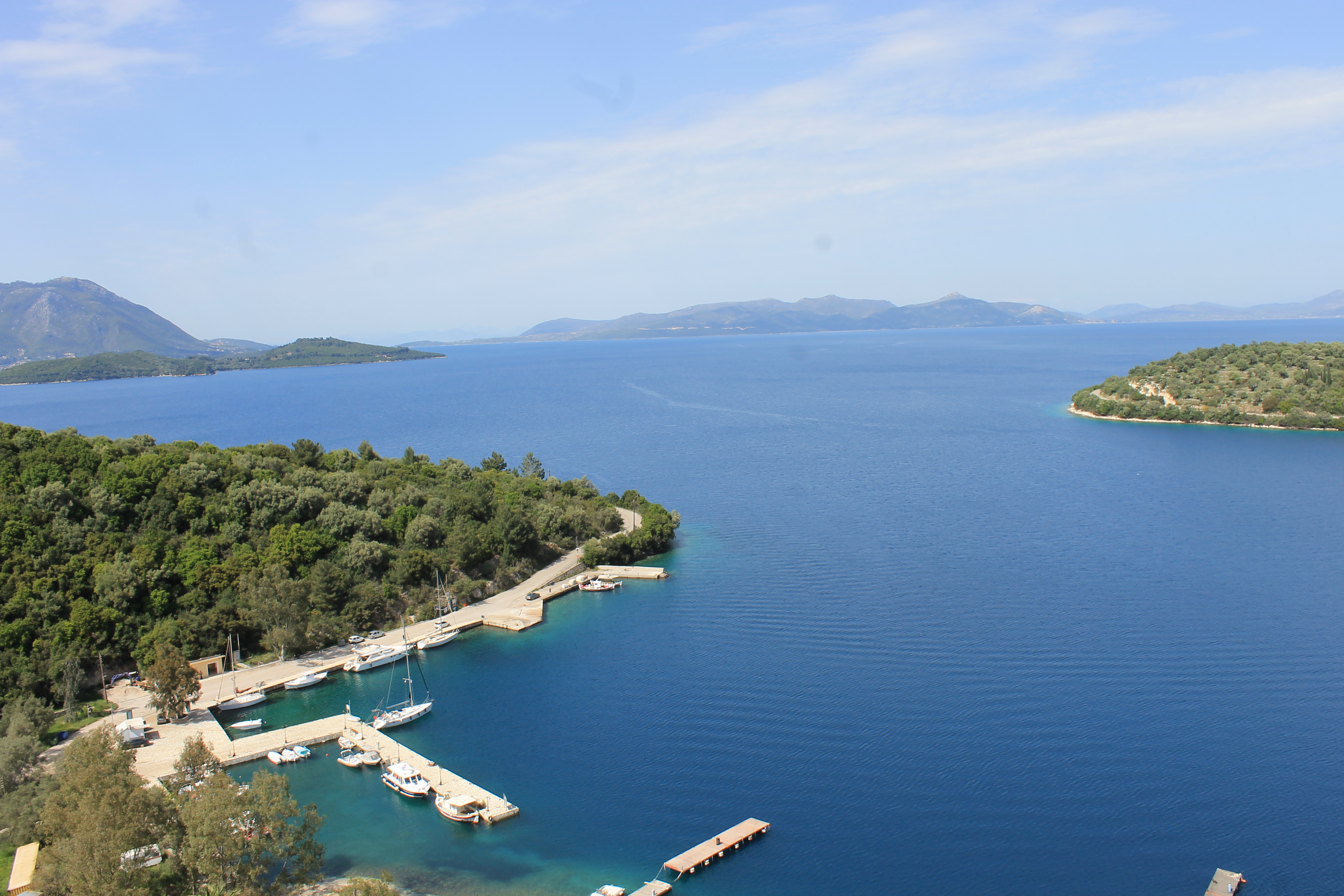
Spilia Port

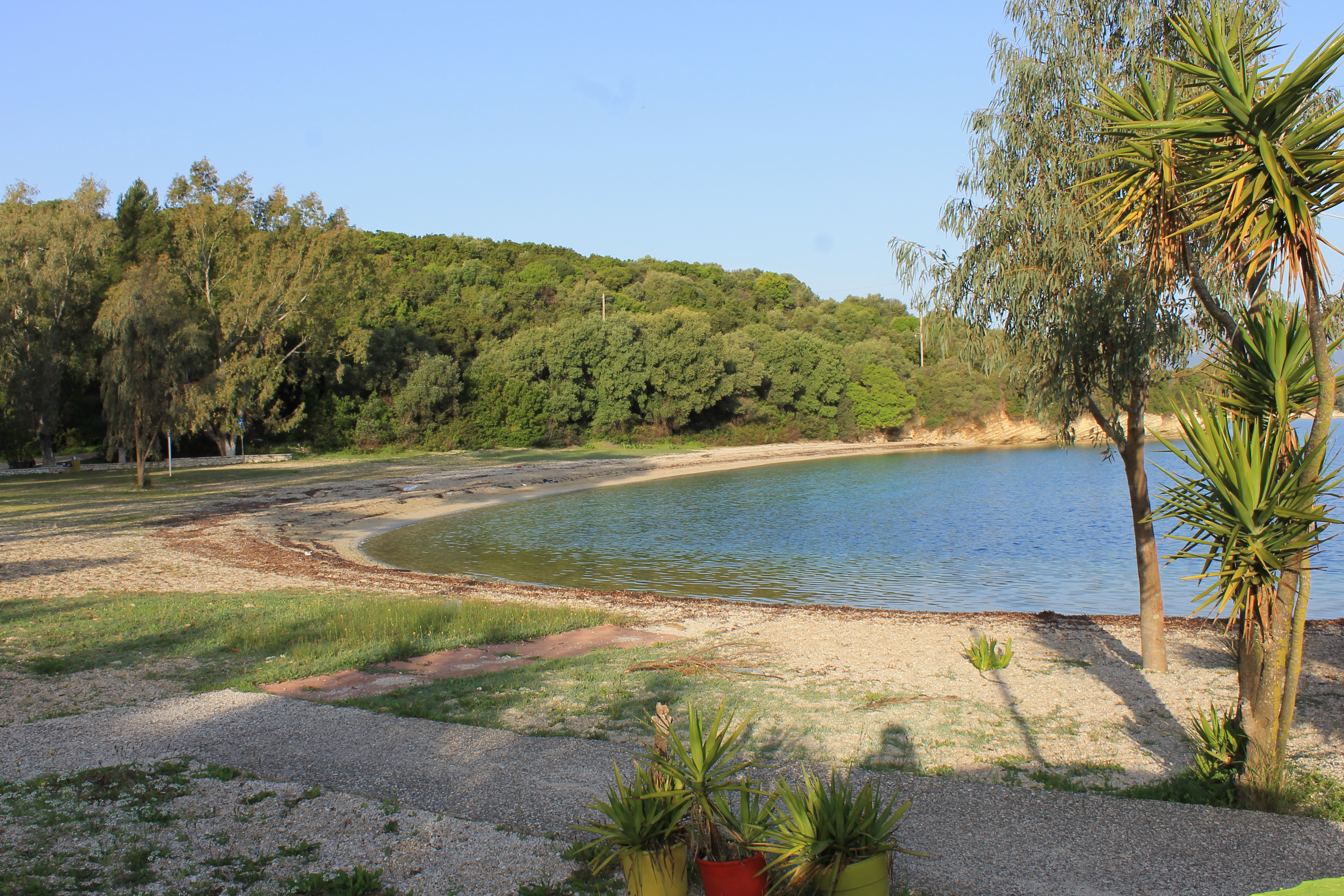
Fanari Beach

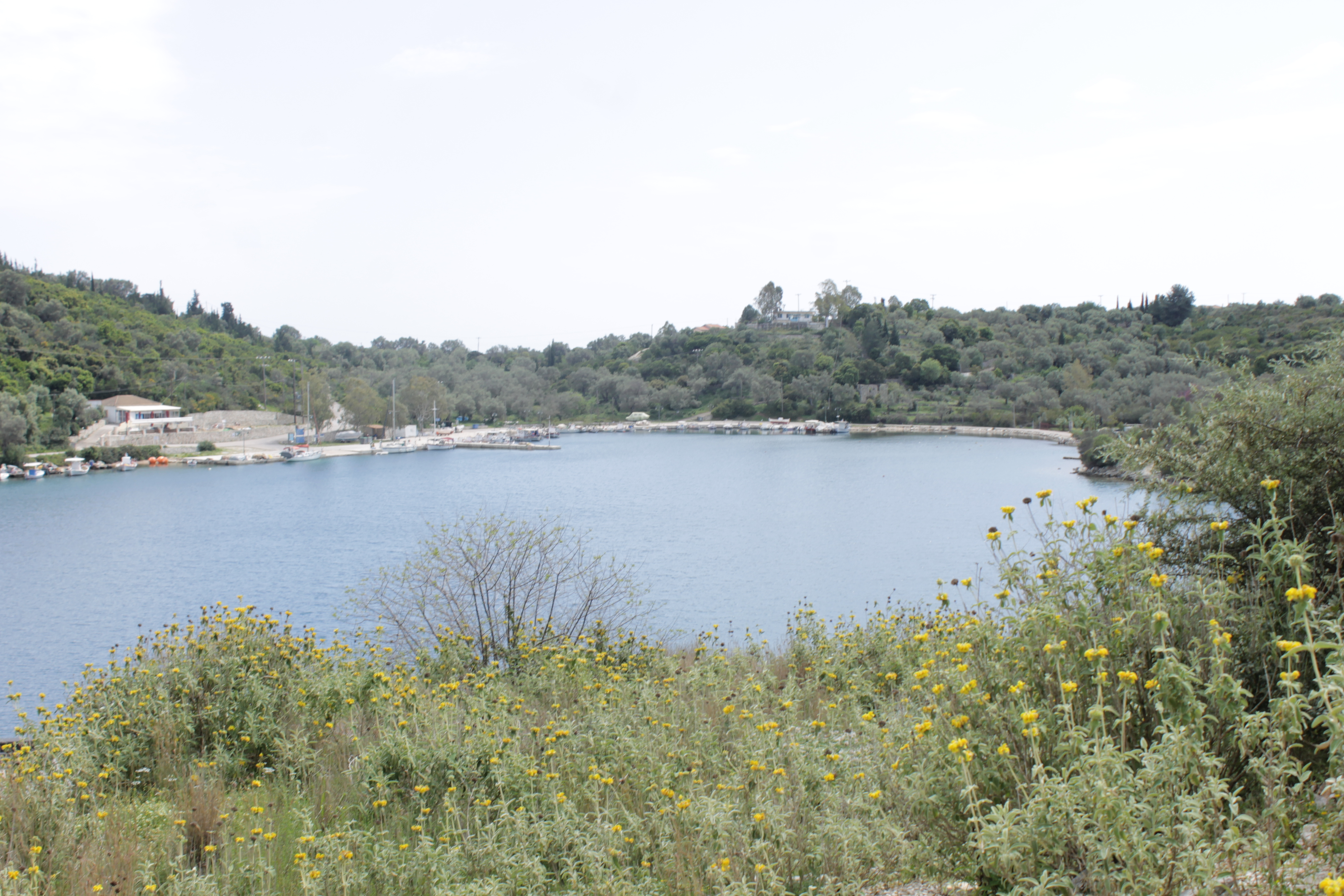
Atherinos Port

== Politics ==
Parliamentary election results since 2000
6/2023	5/2023	2019	9/2015	1/2015	6/2012
1. ND 39.59%; 2. SYRIZA 20.18%; 3. PASOK 15.99%; 4. KKE 12.69%; 5. MERA25 3.55%; 6. PE 2.16%; 7. Spartans 1.40%; 8. ANTARSYA 1.14%; 9. Others 3.30%	1. ND 46.12%; 2. SYRIZA 21.44%; 3. KKE 10.78%; 4. PASOK 10.45%; 5. MERA25 2.80%; 6. ANTARSYA 1.94%; 7. PE 1.40%; 8. EL 1.08%; 9. Others 3.99%	1. ND 42.94%; 2. SYRIZA 30.31%; 3. PASOK 10.76%; 4. KKE 9.48%; 5. MERA25 2.76%; 6. Others 3.75%	1. ND 30.28%; 2. SYRIZA 30.15%; 3. KKE 14.82%; 4. PASOK 11.81%; 5. XA 3.14%; 6. LAE 2.14%; 7. River 2.01%; 8. EK 1.88%; 9. ANEL 1.51%; 10. ANTARSYA 1.51%; 11. Others 0.75%	1. SYRIZA 34.48%; 2. ND 24.17%; 3. KIDISO 12.80%; 4. KKE 11.02%; 5. PASOK 5.21%; 6. River 2.96%; 7. ANEL 2.84%; 8. XA 2.73%; 9. ANTARSYA 1.42%; 10. Others 2.37%	1. SYRIZA 25.85%; 2. ND 24.72%; 3. PASOK 19.03%; 4. KKE 11.58%; 5. XA 5.58%; 6. DIMAR 4.45%; 7. ANEL 4.34%; 8. Others 4.45%
5/2012	2009	2007	2004	2000	
1. ND 22.26%; 2. PASOK 18.94%; 3. SYRIZA 17.91%; 4. KKE 16.15%; 5. ANEL 5.59%; 6. XA 4.97%; 7. DIMAR 3.83%; 8. ANTARSYA 2.28%; 9. OP 1.55%; 10. KKE M-L–M-L KKE 1.35%; 11. DIXA 1.04%; 12. Others 4.13%	1. PASOK 51.34%; 2. ND 27.66%; 3. KKE 11.32%; 4. SYRIZA 4.67%; 5. LAOS 1.38%; 6. ANTARSYA 1.38%; 7. OP 1.21%; 8. Others 1.04%	1. PASOK 50.86%; 2. ND 30.38%; 3. KKE 11.63%; 4. SYRIZA 3.69%; 5. LAOS 1.39%; 6. Others 2.05%	1. PASOK 52.05%; 2. ND 32.36%; 3. KKE 11.12%; 4. SYRIZA 2.63%; 5. Others 1.84%	1. PASOK 53.02%; 2. ND 26.58%; 3. KKE 11.29%; 4. Coalition 4.22%; 5. DIKKI 3.64%; 6. Others 1.25%	

European Parliament election results since 1999
2024	2019	2014	2009	2004	1999
1. ND 23.65%; 2. PASOK 21.12%; 3. KKE 17.15%; 4. SYRIZA 14.62%; 5. MERA25 4.51%; 6. KEKA–AKKEL 3.07%; 7. EL 2.89%; 8. PE 1.99%; 9. Victory 1.81%; 10. FL 1.44%; 11. NA 1.44%; 12. ANTARSYA 1.44%; 13. Democrats 1.08%; 14. Others 3.79%	1. ND 26.58%; 2. SYRIZA 24.44%; 3. PASOK 14.18%; 4. KKE 12.85%; 5. MERA25 5.00%; 6. XA 1.78%; 7. EL 1.34%; 8. ANTARSYA 1.25%; 9. ESY 1.16%; 10. PE 1.07%; 11. ANEL 1.07%; 12. Others 9.28%	1. SYRIZA 27.82%; 2. ND 20.70%; 3. PASOK 10.10%; 4. KKE 9.77%; 5. XA 7.99%; 6. River 5.25%; 7. ANEL 2.39%; 8. EEP 1.95%; 9. PANKI 1.74%; 10. ANTARSYA 1.49%; 11. LAOS 1.41%; 12. KEK 1.38%; 13. DIMAR 1.28%; 14. OP-KPE 1.18%; 15. Others 5.55%	1. PASOK 45.77%; 2. ND 23.34%; 3. KKE 13.98%; 4. SYRIZA 5.07%; 5. ANTARSYA 2.82%; 6. LAOS 2.59%; 7. OP 1.80%; 8. KEK 1.13%; 9. EO 1.13%; 10. Others 2.37%	1. PASOK 46.93%; 2. ND 28.21%; 3. KKE 16.50%; 4. Coalition 3.46%; 5. LAOS 1.67%; 6. Others 3.23%	1. PASOK 43.07%; 2. ND 22.89%; 3. KKE 13.25%; 4. DIKKI 7.43%; 5. Coalition 6.02%; 6. POLAN 4.12%; 7. Others 3.22%

== See also ==
- List of settlements in the Lefkada regional unit
