= Movement of Free Citizens =

Movement of Free Citizens may refer to:

- Movement of Free Citizens (Greece), former political party in Greece.
- Movement of Free Citizens (Serbia), political movement in Serbia.
