= Electra Rome Dochtsi =

Greek politician (born 1998)

- Ηλέκτρα Ρώμη Δόχτση

Co-President of Volt Greece
- Incumbent
- Assumed office 10 April 2025 Serving with Evangelos Liaras
- Preceded by: Stella Psarropoulou

General Secretary of Volt Greece
- In office 19 November 2024 – 10 April 2025
- Preceded by: Konstantinos Kalafatakis
- Succeeded by: office abolished
- In office July 2022 – 13 March 2023
- Succeeded by: Konstantinos Kalafatakis

Personal details
- Born: 15 July 1998 (age 28) Athens, Greece
- Party: Volt Greece

Electra Rome Dochtsi (Athens, 1998) is a Greek politician, management consultant, co-president of Volt Greece, musician, and LGBTQ+ rights activist.

She is the first trans woman leader of a legally recognized political party in Greece. In 2026 she was a candidate for the Co-Presidency of Volt Europa.

== Early life ==
She was born in 1998 in Athens, and raised in Katerini. She originally entered the Audio Visual Arts school of the Ionian University, she then transferred to the University of Piraeus, where she studied Computer Science for four years and at the University of Oulu (under Erasmus), while she is currently studying International Business and Politics at the Copenhagen Business School.

== Political career ==
She is a member of Volt Greece and of Volt Europa from 2021. She was elected its General Secretary in July 2022 until the party's first congress in 2023 and again from its General Assembly in November 2024, till its second Congress in March–April 2025. She ran as part of Haris Doukas’ municipal list in the 2023 Athens municipal election. On 10 April 2025, she was elected Co-President of Volt Greece which makes her the first trans woman to become the leader of a Greek political party.

== Political positions ==
Electra Rome is a Eurofederalist, she seeks the further digitization of the public sector, particularly in Greece with digital courts, and she supports an Open Borders policy with migrant quotas among EU countries. She also backs reforms to the political system of the EU, such as the removal of the veto powers in the European Council and the introduction of funding cuts to countries that stray away from the rule of law. Her platform is that of progressivism and evidence-based policy, -whereby she rejects the left-right political dichotomy,- in contrast to a “toxic, populist opposition”. She herself, identifies as a "professional" and "problem-solving" politician, and seeks to be active in politics without being considered a "diversity hire".
