= Vathy =

Vathy (Greek: Βαθύ), also Vathi may refer to numerous places throughout Greece:

- Vathy, Aegina, a village in the Attica regional unit
- Vathi, Athens, a neighbourhood in the city of Athens, Attica
- Vathy, Euboea, a village in the municipality Chalcis, Euboea, Central Greece
- Vathy, Ithaca, a capital of the island of Ithaca, Ionian Islands
- Vathy, Methana, a village in Methana, Islands regional unit, Attica
- Vathy, Meganisi, a village in the municipality Meganisi, Lefkada regional unit, Ionian Islands
- Vathy, Preveza, a village in the municipality Ziros, Preveza regional unit, Epirus; see Nicopolis § 1st century
- Vathy, Samos, a town in the municipality Samos, North Aegean
- Vathy, Apollonia, a village in the municipality Sifnos, Milos regional unit, South Aegean

== See also ==
- Vathys, a village and valley in the municipality Kalymnos, Kalymnos regional unit, South Aegean
- Vathia (Laconia), Greece, a village in the municipality East Mani, Laconia, Peloponnese
