= 2023 Athens municipal election =

- 8 October 2023 (first round); 15 October 2023 (second round)
- Registered: 449,902
- Turnout: 32.32% (First Round); 26.73% (Second Round)
- Mayoral election (second round)
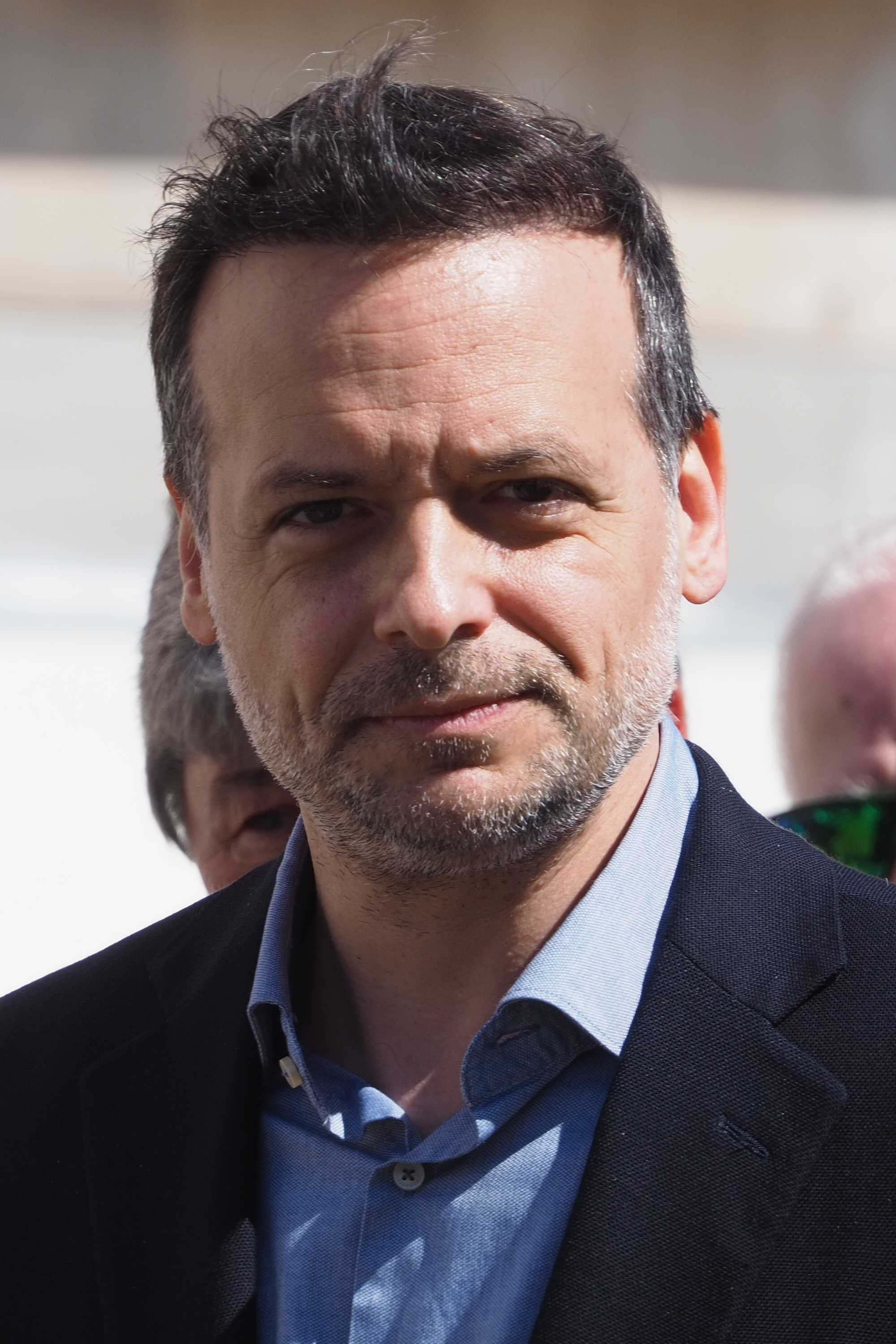

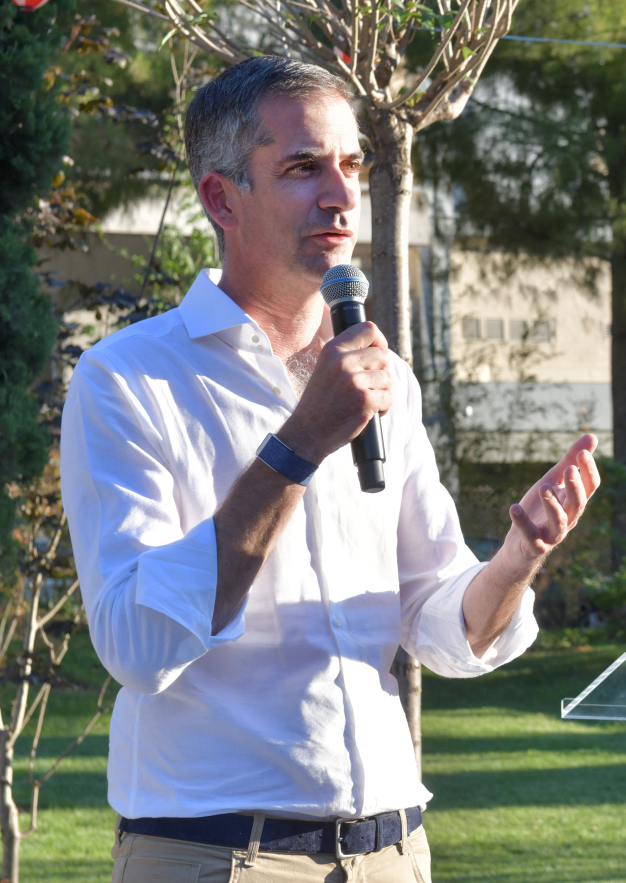
| Candidate | Haris Doukas | Kostas Bakoyiannis |
| Alliance | Athina Tora (Athens Now) | Athina Psila (Athens High Up) |
| First round | 19,842; 14.19% | 57,802; 41.35% |
| Second round | 64,062; 55.97% | 50,397; 44.03% |
- Map of the Second Round per municipal community, showing the difference between the first and second candidates
- Council election
- 8 October 2023
| Electoral list | Leader | Vote % | Seats | +/– |
|---|---|---|---|---|
| Athina Tora (Athens Now) (Note: List endorsed by PASOK, Volt) | Haris Doukas | 14.19% (Note: (first round)); 55.97% (Note: (second round)) | 26 | +20 |
| Athina Psila (Athens High Up) | Kostas Bakoyiannis | 41.35% 44.03% | 8 | −13 |
| Anoixti Poli (Open City) | Kostas Zachariadis | 13.35% | 3 | −5 |
| Laiki Syspeirosi Athinas (Popular Athenian Coalition) | Nikolaos Sofianos | 12.88% | 2 | −2 |
| Eleftheroi Athineoi (Free Athenians) (Note: List endorsed by Kasidiaris' satellite parties, National Party – Greeks, Spartiates) | Ilias Kasidiaris | 8.33% | 2 | −3 |
| Anatreptiki Symmahia gia tin Athina (Subversive Alliance for Athens) (Note: List endorsed by Antarsya, MeRA25) | Kostas Papadakis | 6.09% (Note: Back in 2019, the two main parties making up Antarsya, NAR) and SEK backed separate factions.) | 1 | −1 |
| I Athina Mas (Our Athens) | Eleni Papadopoulou | 3.80% | 1 | +1 |
This lists parties that won seats. See the complete results below.
Results by Municipal Community in the First Round
| Mayor before | Mayor after |
|---|---|
| Kostas Bakoyiannis; ND | Haris Doukas; PASOK |

The 2023 Athens Municipal election was held on 8 October and 15 October 2023 to elect the mayor of Athens as a part of the 2023 Greek Local elections. The first round was inconclusive, and a second round run-off took place a week later, between the two candidates having the most votes, the incumbent Kostas Bakoyannis from conservative New Democracy (ND) party and Haris Doukas from social democratic PASOK party.

In the second round, PASOK candidate Haris Doukas defeated the incumbent Kostas Bakoyiannis. This victory was achieved with the unified backing of Syriza, Volt, the Pirate Party, and other green parties. As a result, Doukas secured an absolute 3/5 majority in the municipal council under the new electoral law.

== Background ==
=== Previous Election ===
In the previous election incumbent PASOK list, with its former candidate not running, was defeated by challenger Bakoyannis winning 21 out of the 49 seats, with Syriza candidate Nasos Iliopoulos coming second being defeated in the second round with ND candidate being ahead with an over 40 point margin, yet this being with the previous electoral law Bakoyannis failed to achieve a full majority in the council. Other smaller candidates also picked up seats, such as Pavlos Geroulanos of PASOK, managing to elect eight seats, Golden Dawn candidate and former spokesman Ilias Kasidiaris electing five, and communist KKE candidate Nikos Sofianos electing four, other more minor lists took up one or fewer seats each.

2019 Athens municipal election result
| List | Seats | 1st round Vote share (%) | 2nd round Vote share (%) |
|---|---|---|---|
| Athina Psila | 21 | 42.65 | 65.25 |
| Anihti Poli | 8 | 16.98 | 24.75 |
| Athina eisai Esy | 6 | 13.19 | |
| Elliniki Avgi gia tin Athina | 5 | 10.53 | |
| Laiki Syspirosi Athinas | 4 | 7.47 | |
| Athina Gia tin Ellada | 1 | 2.21 | |
| Athina kai pali Athina | 1 | 2.04 | |
| Athina, to spiti mas | 1 | 1.57 | |
| Antarsia Stis Geitonies tis Athinas | 1 | 1.54 | |
| Antikapitalistiki Anatropi - Antarsia stin Athina | 1 | 0.99 | |
| Metopo Anatropis gia tin Athina | 0 | 0.82 | |

=== 2021 electoral system ===
The New Democracy government enacted "Law 4804/2021," which replaced the previous law on local elections. According to the new law, in all municipal elections in Greece, the system used is one of 2-round proportional representation with reinforced proportinality. Specifically, "the distribution of municipal or regional council seats between the successful and runner-up list is done by a system of reinforced proportionality so that the successful combination holds at least 3/5 of the council seats." Also, it also provided the requirements for a list to enter the council, "[...] in order for a list to be entitled to at least one seat on the municipal or district council, it must receive at least 3% of the valid ballots in the first round of elections. The combination that received at least 43% of the valid ballots plus one vote in the first round is declared successful, and its head is elected mayor or regional governor." The law faced backlash with parties on the threshold, including the parties conjoined in Antarsya (New Left Current (NAR), Socialist Workers' Party, Revolutionary Communist Movement of Greece (EKKE), Alternative Ecologists) calling the law undemocratic and that ND was attempting to reinforce their own position by removing simple proportionality.

== Candidates ==
=== Athens NOW (Athina TORA) ===
Athens NOW (Greek: Αθήνα ΤΩΡΑ, romanized: Athina TORA) was a municipal list formed in August 2023 based on an environmentalist, anti-tourist ideology with its candidate being PASOK member Haris Doukas. Specifically, Doukas' 5-year goals were to plant 25,000 trees throughout Athens, reduce the temperature in the summer months, reduce noise pollution, and improve the air quality of Athens by 25%. The Athens NOW list surpassed Syriza's candidate and entered the second round, whereby securing the support of Syriza, as well as the support from PASOK, Volt Greece, Pirate Party, and other small Green parties. Doukas, with unified support, defeated incumbent ND affiliate Kostas Bakoyannis and elected 26 councilors.

=== Athens High Up (Athina Psila) ===
Athens High Up (Greek: Αθήνα Ψηλά, romanized: Athina Psila) was the incumbent list endorsed by the governing party New Democracy with its candidate being incumbent mayor Kostas Bakoyannis. The list of Athens High Up was defeated by the challenger, Doukas, with a 10-point difference.

=== Open City (Anoihti Poli) ===
Open City (Greek: Ανοιχτή Πόλη, romanized: Anoihti Poli) was the list endorsed by the then main opposition party Syriza, its candidate being Kostas Zachariadis who was chosen through a slim margin 17–15 in the political secretary, with other options being basketballer Nikos Pappas. Zachariadis was eliminated in the first round of voting, receiving approximately 13% of the vote. In the second round, Zachariadis endorsed Doukas and his list.

=== Popular Athenian Coalition (Laiki Syspeirosi Athinas) ===
Popular Athenian Coalition (Greek: Λαϊκή Συσπείρωση Αθήνας, romanized: Laiki Syspeirosi Athinas) was the list endorsed by the Communist Party of Greece (KKE) with their candidate Nikolaos Sofianos. The list saw a rise parallel to the one that their party saw in the May and June 2023 parliamentary elections.

=== Free Athenians (Eleftheroi Athineoi) ===
Free Athenians (Greek: Ελεύθεροι Αθηναίοι, romanized: Eleftheroi Athineoi) was the list endorsed by National Party – Greeks and the Spartiates party, and used to be endorsed by the now illegal Golden Dawn party. It was led by Ilias Kasidiaris, a convicted felon. The list managed to elect two councilors, including Kasidiaris.

=== Subversive Alliance for Athens (Anatreptiki Symmahia gia tin Athina) ===
Subversive alliance for Athens (Greek: Ανατρεπτική Συμμαχία για την Αθήνα, romanized: Anatreptiki Symmahia gia tin Athina) was a list of a coalition of Far-Left Groups that united when ND enacted a new election law that made it mandatory for a list to reach at least 3% to elect a councilor. Uniting behind the lawyer of the Golden Dawn trials Kostas Papadakis, the group was backed by Antarsya and MeRA25. The group reached 6% in the election, electing Kostas Papadakis as its Councilor.

=== Our Athens (I Athina Mas) ===
Our Athens (Greek: Η Αθήνα Μας, romanized: I Athina Mas) was the only independent list in the elections with their candidate being Eleni Papadopoulou, the list's beliefs tend to be in line with more right-wing thought with their candidate criticizing pride parades and illegal immigration. The list elected its candidate as councilor with almost 4% of the vote.

== Opinion polls ==
| Fieldwork Date | Polling firm | Doukas | Bakoyiannis | Zachariadis | Sofianos | Kasidiaris | Papadakis | Papadopoulou | Abstain | DK/DA | Undecided | Lead |
| 15 Oct | Second Round Results | 55.97 | 44.03 | | | | | | | | | 11.94 |
|---|---|---|---|---|---|---|---|---|---|---|---|---|
| 13 Oct | Realpolls | 46.4 | 35.5 | – | | | | | 8.7 | 9.4 | – | 10.9 |
| 8 Oct | First Round Results | 14.19 | 41.35 | 13.35 | 12.88 | 8.33 | 6.09 | 3.80 | | | | 27.16 |
| 6 Oct | Realpolls | 12.1 | 26.3 | 10.5 | 9.1 | 8.4 | 6.4 | 3.6 | 4 | 2.9 | 16.7 | 14.2 |
| 6 Oct | Realpolls | 32.3 | 31.4 | – | | | | | 25.9 | 10.4 | – | 0.9 |
| 6 Oct | Realpolls | – | 35.2 | 29.8 | – | | | | 26.1 | 8.8 | – | 5.4 |
| 3 Oct | Prorata | 9 | 38 | 14.5 | 8.5 | 8.5 | – | | | | 15.5 | 5.4 |

== Results ==
| Candidate | Party | First round | | Second round | | Seats | +/– |
| Candidate | Party | Votes | % | Votes | % | Seats | +/– |
|---|---|---|---|---|---|---|---|
| Kostas Bakoyiannis | Athens High Up | 57,802 | 41.35 | 50,397 | 44.03 | 8 | –13 |
| Haris Doukas | Athens Now | 19,842 | 14.19 | 64,062 | 55.97 | 26 | +20 |
| Kostas Zachariadis | Open City | 18,668 | 13.35 | | | 3 | –5 |
| Nikolaos Sofianos | Popular Athenian Coalition | 18,002 | 12.88 | | | 2 | –2 |
| Ilias Kasidiaris | Free Athenians | 11,643 | 8.33 | | | 2 | –3 |
| Kostas Papadakis | Subversive Alliance for Athens | 8,515 | 6.09 | | | 1 | –1 |
| Eleni Papadopoulou | Our Athens | 5,311 | 3.80 | | | 1 | New |
| Total | | 139,783 | 100.00 | 114,459 | 100.00 | 43 | – |
| Valid votes | | 139,783 | 96.14 | 114,459 | 95.18 | | |
| Invalid votes | | 3,277 | 2.25 | 3,102 | 2.58 | | |
| Blank votes | | 2,334 | 1.61 | 2,700 | 2.25 | | |
| Total votes | | 145,394 | 100.00 | 120,261 | 100.00 | | |
| Registered voters/turnout | | 449,902 | 32.32 | 449,902 | 26.73 | | |

=== Members Elected ===
Members Elected to Municipal Council
| List | Full name |
|---|---|
| Athens NOW | Haris Doukas |
| Athens NOW | Roxani-Evangelia Bei-Karampotsou |
| Athens NOW | Georgios Apostolopoulos |
| Athens NOW | Ioanna (Tzini) Gennimata |
| Athens NOW | Maria Stratigaki |
| Athens NOW | Olga Dourou |
| Athens NOW | Christina Vasileiou |
| Athens NOW | Kalliopi (Popi) Giannopoulou |
| Athens NOW | Zacharoula Agrogianni – Moukriotou |
| Athens NOW | Nikolaos Laliotis |
| Athens NOW | Athanasios Cheimonas |
| Athens NOW | Georgios-Konstantinos Giannaros |
| Athens NOW | Artemis Skoumpourdi |
| Athens NOW | Eleni Zontirou |
| Athens NOW | Vasiliki Barka |
| Athens NOW | Maro Evangelidou |
| Athens NOW | Nikos Chrysogelos |
| Athens NOW | Dimitra Sideri |
| Athens NOW | Thomas Georgiadis |
| Athens NOW | Evangelos Giannopoulos |
| Athens NOW | Mina Fountzoula |
| Athens NOW | Panagiotis – Paris Charlaftis |
| Athens NOW | Elena Mantzavinou |
| Athens NOW | Andreas Grammatikogiannis |
| Athens NOW | Manolis Velegrakis |
| Athens NOW | Despoina Limniotaki |
| Athens High Up | Kostas Bakoyannis |
| Athens High Up | Nikolaos Avramidis |
| Athens High Up | Christos Tentomas |
| Athens High Up | Manolis Kalampokas |
| Athens High Up | Alexia Evert Alverti |
| Athens High Up | Georgios Voulgarakis |
| Athens High Up | Katerina Gkagkaki Dimitriadou |
| Athens High Up | Sakis Kollatos |
| Open City | Kostas Zachariadis |
| Open City | Despoina Alevyzaki |
| Open City | Diana Voutyrakou |
| Popular Athenian Coalition | Nikolaos Sofianos |
| Popular Athenian Coalition | Charis Vourdoumpas |
| Free Athenians | Ilias Kasidiaris |
| Free Athenians | Gianna Betty |
| Subversive Alliance for Athens | Kostas Papadakis |
| Our Athens | Papadopoulou Eleni |

== Community Results ==
All seven Municipal Communities were won by Kostas Bakoyannis in the first round (see tables below). However, Haris Doukas won a 3/5 majority due to his victory in the second round, with all other lists getting either one or no seats in every Community Council, based on the new electoral law in all individual councils.

=== First Municipal Community ===
| List | Seats | 1st Round | | 2nd Round | |
| List | Seats | Vote share | % | Vote share | % |
|---|---|---|---|---|---|
| Athens Now | 9 | 3,485 | 18.9 | 9,439 | 51.9 |
| Athens High Up | 3 | 7,259 | 39.5 | 7,037 | 48.1 |
| Open City | 1 | 2,310 | 12.5 | | |
| Popular Athenian Coalition | 1 | 1,901 | 10.3 | | |
| Subversive Alliance for Athens | 1 | 1,533 | 8.3 | | |
| Free Athenians | 0 | 1,209 | 6.5 | | |
| Our Athens | 0 | 664 | 3.6 | | |

=== Second Municipal Community ===
| List | Seats | 1st Round | | 2nd Round | |
| List | Seats | Vote share | % | Vote share | % |
|---|---|---|---|---|---|
| Athens Now | 9 | 3,548 | 14.9 | 9,985 | 56.7 |
| Athens High Up | 3 | 9,925 | 41.7 | 7,613 | 43.3 |
| Open City | 1 | 3,252 | 13.6 | | |
| Popular Athenian Coalition | 1 | 3,073 | 12.9 | | |
| Free Athenians | 1 | 1,849 | 7.7 | | |
| Subversive Alliance for Athens | 0 | 1,305 | 5.4 | | |
| Our Athens | 0 | 847 | 3.5 | | |

=== Third Municipal Community ===
| List | Seats | 1st Round | | 2nd Round | |
| List | Seats | Vote share | % | Vote share | % |
|---|---|---|---|---|---|
| Athens Now | 7 | 1,471 | 11.1 | 5,843 | 56.1 |
| Athens High Up | 2 | 5,634 | 42.6 | 4,678 | 43.9 |
| Open City | 1 | 1,904 | 14.4 | | |
| Popular Athenian Coalition | 1 | 1,801 | 13.6 | | |
| Free Athenians | 0 | 1,151 | 8.7 | | |
| Subversive Alliance for Athens | 0 | 780 | 5.9 | | |
| Our Athens | 0 | 470 | 3.5 | | |

=== Fourth Municipal Community ===
| List | Seats | 1st Round | | 2nd Round | |
| List | Seats | Vote share | % | Vote share | % |
|---|---|---|---|---|---|
| Athens Now | 9 | 2,063 | 11.6 | 7,795 | 53.0 |
| Athens High Up | 3 | 7,671 | 43.4 | 6,930 | 47.0 |
| Popular Athenian Coalition | 1 | 2,421 | 13.7 | | |
| Open City | 1 | 2,160 | 12.2 | | |
| Free Athenians | 1 | 1,919 | 10.8 | | |
| Subversive Alliance for Athens | 0 | 790 | 4.4 | | |
| Our Athens | 0 | 620 | 3.5 | | |

=== Fifth Municipal Community ===
| List | Seats | 1st Round | | 2nd Round | |
| List | Seats | Vote share | % | Vote share | % |
|---|---|---|---|---|---|
| Athens Now | 9 | 2,620 | 13.2 | 9,560 | 56.2 |
| Athens High Up | 2 | 8,139 | 41.1 | 7,447 | 43.8 |
| Popular Athenian Coalition | 1 | 2,811 | 14.2 | | |
| Open City | 1 | 2,688 | 13.5 | | |
| Free Athenians | 0 | 1,664 | 8.4 | | |
| Subversive Alliance for Athens | 0 | 1,076 | 5.4 | | |
| Our Athens | 0 | 791 | 3.9 | | |

=== Sixth Municipal Community ===
| List | Seats | 1st Round | | 2nd Round | |
| List | Seats | Vote share | % | Vote share | % |
|---|---|---|---|---|---|
| Athens Now | 9 | 2,949 | 13.7 | 8,021 | 55.2 |
| Athens High Up | 2 | 8,722 | 40.6 | 6,503 | 44.8 |
| Open City | 1 | 2,903 | 13.5 | | |
| Popular Athenian Coalition | 1 | 2,632 | 12.2 | | |
| Free Athenians | 1 | 2,006 | 9.3 | | |
| Subversive Alliance for Athens | 0 | 1,301 | 6.0 | | |
| Our Athens | 0 | 962 | 4.4 | | |

=== Seventh Municipal Community ===
| List | Seats | 1st Round | | 2nd Round | |
| List | Seats | Vote share | % | Vote share | % |
|---|---|---|---|---|---|
| Athens Now | 9 | 3,688 | 14.4 | 7,356 | 53.6 |
| Athens High Up | 2 | 10,452 | 40.9 | 6,368 | 46.4 |
| Open City | 1 | 3,451 | 13.5 | | |
| Popular Athenian Coalition | 1 | 3,363 | 13.1 | | |
| Free Athenians | 1 | 1,845 | 7.2 | | |
| Subversive Alliance for Athens | 0 | 1,730 | 6.7 | | |
| Our Athens | 0 | 975 | 3.8 | | |

Note: The results of the second round are not stated for each Community, but they are stated for every polling place. This may be because the seats are distributed independently of how the community voted in the second round and distributed according to the results of the first round and the overall victor of the second round.

== Aftermath ==
=== Reactions ===
After the election results, PASOK, having supported Doukas' ecologist list, asserted itself as the second most popular political party nationwide in the local elections. Syriza also congratulated Doukas, as their leader Stefanos Kasselakis endorsed him in the second round. The victory of Doukas attracted nationwide press and media attention. Doukas was the second most popular candidate in the elections in October 2024 for the leadership of PASOK, receiving 40.08%.

==== Post-Election proposed reforms ====
After the second round of elections, the New Democracy government raised the possibility of proposing new reforms for local elections. These proposed reforms became known as the "Livanios Plan" and they entail the following: new digital voting and the possibility of by-elections, also removing "crosses," (Note: Crosses being the selective voting of individual councilor candidates of one particular list.) the selective voting of individual councilors of one particular list, the lack of crosses being the same model followed by the state in Parliamentary elections. There was a backlash from opposition parties to the proposed reforms. Syriza's parliamentary group spokesman Nikos Pappas rejected the plan, stating that "this plan [The one proposed by ND] is not steering in this direction," and instead proposed a plan with second choice votes. PASOK's leader Nikos Androulakis exclaimed criticism, stating that ND is undermining local governance, which was described as "fundamental to our democracy."

=== The resignation of Ilias Kasidiaris ===
In the results of the election Ilias Kasidiaris' list, two councilors, including himself, were elected. But due to his participation in convicted far-right criminal organization Golden Dawn as chairman, his reelection came under fire from antifascist groups with protests being held against him. Due to legal issues that would disallow him from serving as councilor and complaints from groups such as the members of the list of Kostas Papadakis, Kasidiaris resigned on 1 January 2024, having just taken the position.
