= Nikos Chrysogelos =

Greek chemist and politician

- Νίκος Χρυσόγελος
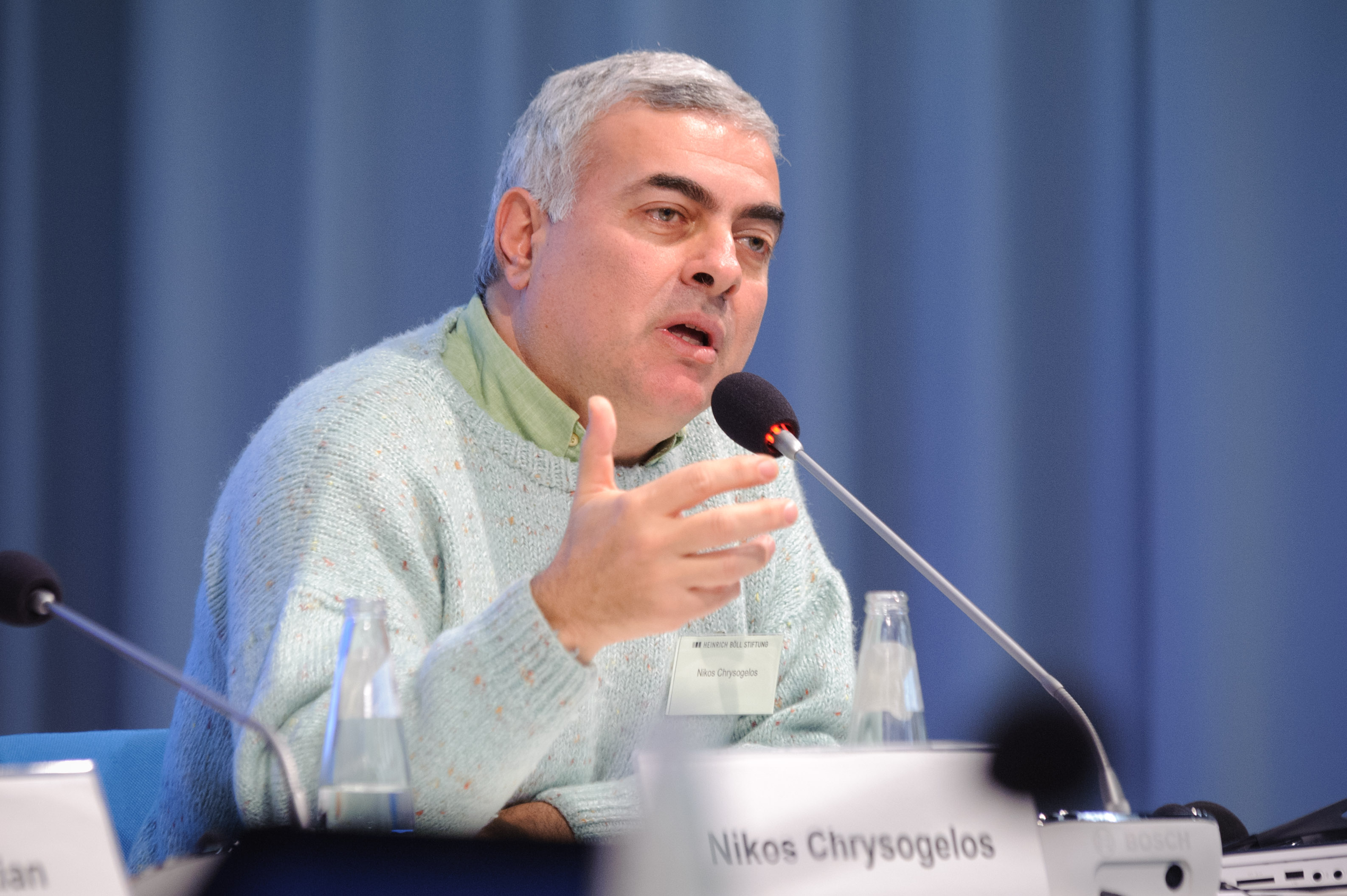

Member of the European Parliament for Greece
- Incumbent
- Assumed office 2 February 2012
- Preceded by: Michalis Tremopoulos

Personal details
- Born: May 13, 1959 (age 66) Sifnos, Greece
- Party: Greens (since 2014); Ecologist Greens (2002–2014)
- Profession: Chemist

Nikos Chrysogelos (Greek: Νίκος Χρυσόγελος; born 13 May 1959) is a Greek chemist and politician. In 2012, he replaced Michalis Tremopoulos as a member of the European Parliament (MEP) for the Ecologist Greens. In 2014 he however left his party to found the new Greens party which in the January 2015 legislative election formed a common electoral list with Democratic Left, but missed the 3% electoral threshold.
