= Panhellenic Citizen Chariot =

Political party in Greece

Panhellenic Citizen Chariot Πανελλήνιο Άρμα Πολιτών
- Leader: Giannis Dimaras
- Founded: April 2011
- Dissolved: 2022
- Split from: Panhellenic Socialist Movement
- Headquarters: Anthimou Gazi 9; 10 561 Athens
- Ideology: Social democracy Democratic socialism Populism; Euroscepticism
- Political position: Centre-left
- National affiliation: Free People
- Colours: Green, red, orange

Website
- www.armapoliton.eu

Panhellenic Citizen Chariot (Greek: Πανελλήνιο Άρμα Πολιτών) was a Greek anti-austerity party.

The party was formed by two MPs of the Panhellenic Socialist Movement, Giannis Dimaras and Vasilis Oikonomou. On October 20, 2011, Vasilis Oikonomou decided to form his own movement under the name "Free Citizens".

On 17 April 2012, an election cooperation agreement with the conservative anti-austerity party Independent Greeks was reached. The leader Giannis Dimaras and Gabriel Avramidis were elected with the Independent Greeks in Athens B and Thessaloniki A constituencies, respectively.
