= Kosmos (political party) =

Kosmos Κόσμος
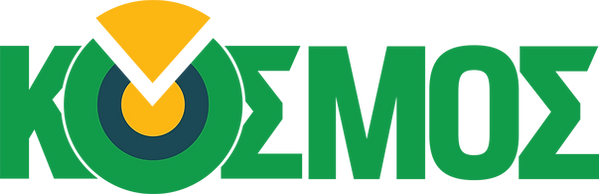
- Leader: Petros S. Kokkalis
- Founders: Petros S. Kokkalis; Maria Vassilakou; Lefteris Papagiannakis
- Founded: 13 February 2024
- Split from: Syriza
- Headquarters: Voulis 21, 10563 Athens
- Ideology: Green politics Political ecology Pro-Europeanism
- Political position: Centre-left
- European Parliament group: Greens/EFA
- Colours: Green
- Hellenic Parliament: 0 / 300
- European Parliament: 0 / 21

Website
- kosmos.gr

Kosmos (Greek: Κόσμος, romanized: Kósmos, lit. 'World' or 'People') is a green political party in Greece, founded in 2024 by MEP Petros S. Kokkalis, Maria Vassilakou and Lefteris Papagiannakis.

== History ==
"Kosmos" ecological citizens' movement was founded Petros S. Kokkalis in 2019, while at the same time he joined the "Progressive Alliance", an attempt to expand Syriza party. Kokkalis participated in the 2019 European Parliament election in Greece as a Syriza candidate and was elected as MEP.

In November 2023, Kokkalis left Syriza, and a few months later he left The Left in the European Parliament and joined the Greens/EFA.

In February 2024, "Kosmos" was officially founded as a political party, with Kokkalis, Maria Vassilakou and Lefteris Papagiannakis forming the governing committee. In March, the temporary bodies of Kosmos were elected, while Kokkalis was appointed secretary of the party.

On 9 April 2024, the participation of the Volt Greece party in the Kosmos ballot was announced. On 18 April, the participation of the Greens – Ecology party in the Kosmos ballot was announced, after the signing of a bilateral agreement between the co-presidents Vassilikis Grammatikoyannis and Ilias Gianniris with Petros Kokkalis.

On 9 June 2024, the party participated in the 2024 European Parliament elections with its slogan "Because our life matters" («Γιατί η ζωή μας έχει σημασία») but failing to retain its one seat.

== Election results ==
=== European Parliament ===
European Parliament
Election	Votes	%	±pp	Seats won	+/−	Rank	Leader	EP Group
2024	42,762	1.08%	New	0 / 21	New	13th	Petros S. Kokkalis	−
