= Democratic Revival =

Democratic Revival Δημοκρατική Αναγέννηση Dimokratiki Anagennisi
- Leader: Theodoros Pantoulas
- Founded: 17 December 2003
- Headquarters: Navarchou Nikodimou 2, 10557 Athens; 55, Ermou Str., 54623 Thessaloniki
- Ideology: Greek nationalism Christian democracy Social conservatism
- Political position: Centre to centre-right
- Colours: blue, red, green

Website
- danagennisi.gr

The Democratic Revival (Greek: Δημοκρατική Αναγέννηση Dimokratiki Anagennisi) is a political party in Greece, initially founded in 2004 by Stelios Papathemelis. It was deactivated after its leader participated in the legislative elections of 2004 with PASOK and New Democracy and was elected MP.

The party was reactivated in March 2007. In the legislative elections of 2007 the party cooperated with Christian Democracy.

== Ideology ==
According to party literature, Democratic Revival characterizes itself as "democratic, progressive, patriotic, and social". Party leader Papathemelis has defined the party as belonging "politically to the center. Socially, however, as Christians, we surpass all forms of social leftism and progressivism". Papathemelis has stated that Democratic Revival is made up of "groups and cadres which, naturally, come from diverse political positions. With us is Christian Democracy, a movement of the Christian left with history. With us are many cadres from Democratic Social Movement. With us are cadres from PASOK, and cadres from even New Democracy. With us also are cadres from Popular Orthodox Rally who left and recently joined us for reasons they have made public".

In regards to the latter, one such individual included Efthimios Droulias, though he later left Democratic Revival as well.

== Electoral results ==
Results, 2004-2012 (year links to election page)
Year	Type of Election	Votes	%	Mandates
2004	Parliament	participated with ND	-	1
2007	Parliament	57,189	0.80	0
2009	Parliament	30,784	0.45	0
May 2012	Parliament	58,459	0.92	0
