= Christian Democracy (Greece) =

Christian Democracy Χριστιανική Δημοκρατία
- President: Giannis Zervos
- Founder: Nikos Psaroudakis
- Founded: 1953
- Ideology: Christian socialism Democratic socialism
- Political position: Left-wing

Website
- xristianiki.gr

Christian Democracy (Greek: Χριστιανική Δημοκρατία, Christianiki Dimokratia) is a Greek Christian socialist political party and movement founded on November 29, 1953, by Nikolaos Psaroudakis. Its political activity was banned during the dictatorship of the Colonels (1967-1974). It was re-established on 6 January 1975 as a social movement that activates its party character whenever it considers appropriate. Since the founding of the Movement, the newspaper "Christianiki" (originally with the title "Christianiki Dimokratia") has been continuously published, with the exception of the period when the dictatorship of the Colonels had imposed preventive censorship (21.4.1967 until the whole of 1969) and from December 1973 to July 1974, when the dictatorial regime closed the newspaper.

In the national elections of 1956 the party participated only in the Samos district and got 449 votes and 0.01%. Its youth organization, Greek Christian Democratic Youth Organisation (Ελληνική Χριστιανοδημοκρατική Οργάνωση Νέων (Ε.Χ.Ο.Ν.)), was established in 1961. In the National Elections of 1963 the party participated only in the Cania district and got 1267 votes and 0.03%.

During the Greek military junta of 1967–1974, its leader Nikos Psaroudakis was exiled by the regime in Gyaros (Greek: Γυάρος).

After the restoration of democracy, the party participated with Centre Union – New Forces in the national elections of 1974. In the national elections of 1977 it participated in the Progress and Left Forces Alliance, a coalition of small left-wing parties. In the elections for the European Parliament in 1981, the party received 1.15% of the total votes. Further, the National Elections of 1981, it received 0.15% of the total votes. It also participated in the elections for the European Parliament in 1984 and got 0.45%; in the national elections of June 1989, it got 0.2%.

It supported PASOK in the national elections of 1985 and Democratic Revival in the national elections of 2007.

In the national elections of May 2023, Christian Democracy participated in the coalition "Political Initiative" (Politiki Protovoulia- Πολιτική Πρωτοβουλία).
