= Pirate Party of Greece =

Pirate Party of Greece Κόμμα Πειρατών Ελλάδας
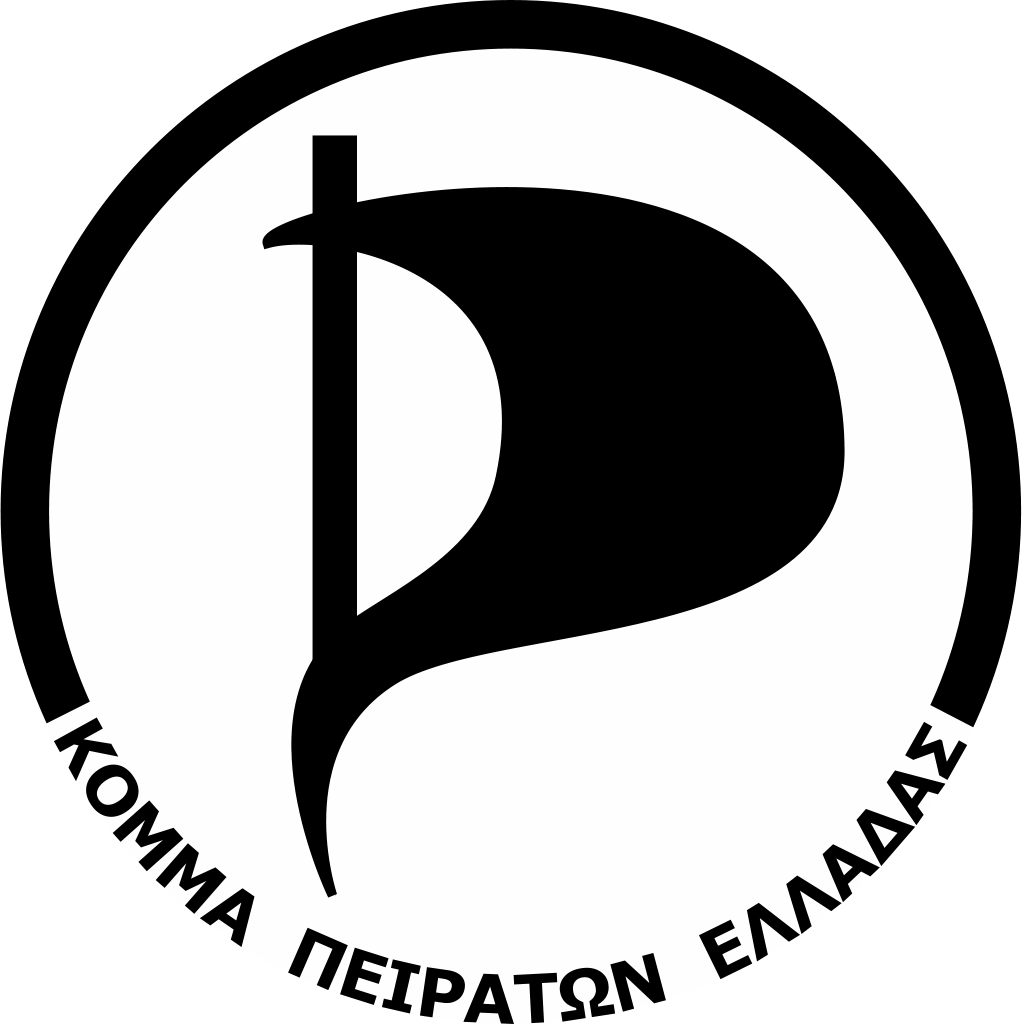
- Leader: Has no leader, but a Governing Board.
- Founded: 14 January 2012; 14 years ago
- Headquarters: Athens
- Ideology: Pirate politics Direct democracy Participatory democracy E-democracy; Anti-corruption; Secularism
- International affiliation: Pirate Parties International (until 2025)
- European political alliance: European Pirate Party (until 2025)

Website
- pirateparty.gr

The Pirate Party of Greece (Greek: Κόμμα Πειρατών Ελλάδας) is a political party in Greece. Initially based on the model of the Swedish Pirate Party, its basic platform is aligned with the global Pirate movement, and supports reform of copyright law to reflect open source and free culture values, government transparency, evidence-based policy, egalitarianism, the abolition or severe reform of patents, and respect for privacy and civil liberties. In recent years, it has expanded its scope to a broader range of policy topics, such as its support for a fully secular state, the adoption of universal basic income, its call for stronger protection of reproductive rights, its opposition to militarism, nationalism, colonialism, and its drive for the further democratization of the European Union.

The party was founded on 14 January 2012. It was officially recognized on 10 February 2012, and had 480 members on that date. In 2013, during its 2nd Congress, its members voted to remove an explicit reference to direct democracy from its principles. This decision was reversed in the 12th Congress of June 2025 with the adoption of the Rethymno Declaration, which explicitly mentions direct and participatory democracy (i.e. the combination of the two) as a prerequisite for the strengthening of democracy and the rule of law. This decision was also reflected in an amendment to the party's declaration of principles and priorities.

It was a full member of the Pirate Parties International (PPI) and the European Pirate Party (PPEU) until June 2025, when its members unanimously voted to leave the two entities, citing ideological issues, a lack of political added value, and a lack of room for "constructive and productive political discourse". Their departure from the PPI was followed by the United States Pirate Party's own resignation from the entity on February 1, 2026, explicitly citing the PPI's stance on the Gaza genocide and the Israeli occupation of the West Bank.

== History ==
=== May/June Legislative Elections 2012 ===
In the 6 May 2012 Greek legislative election, the party managed to present candidates in 31 of the 56 constituencies and secured 0.51% (32,484) of the total votes. Out of 32 parties, the Pirate Party came 19th. In the June 2012 election the party received 0.23% of the vote (14,169), coming 14th out of 21 parties.

=== 2nd Congress of 2013 ===
In the 2nd Congress (2013), the party's members voted to remove an explicit reference to direct democracy from its principles. This was reverted in the 12th Congress of 2025, with the adoption of the Rethymno Declaration.

=== European Elections 2014 ===
On 25 May 2014, the party participated in the 2014 European elections in a coalition with Ecologist Greens. The coalition received 0.90% (51,573) of the vote. Noted that Ecologist Greens (standalone with no coalition and before their breakup in two separate parties) received in the May 2012 election 2.93% (185,366) of the vote, and in the June 2012 election 0.88% (54,420) of the vote. Their second half, Prasinoi, participated separately in the European elections and received 0.50% (28,460 votes).

=== European Elections 2019 ===
In May 2019, the party participated in the 2019 European elections in a coalition with Popular Unity. The coalition received 0.56% (31,674) of the vote.

=== 11th Congress of 2023 ===
In November 2023, the party's 11th Congress adopted new, more comprehensive, Statutes and decided to expand its scope by trying to address areas such as education, healthcare, public administration, and immigration. In this Congress, marking a break from classic Pirate practice, it abolished the "not left, not center, not right" approach adopted by many other Pirate Parties, deeming it "neo-LePenist" and a backdoor for ideological and political derailment into the far-right.

=== 12th Congress of June 2025 ===
On 1 June 2025, the 12th Congress of the party unanimously decided to furter expand and strengthen its Statutes, affirming its alignment with the progressive parties of the political spectrum, domestically and internationally; among other things, it explicitly strengthened in-party protections for people with disabilities, women, LGBTQI+ persons, and extended these protections to people outside the party. It also unanimously decided to leave the European Pirate Party and the Pirate Parties International, with its resignation pointing to a deep ideological and moral schism. Finally, it decided to replace the Uppsala Declaration with the Rethymno Declaration.

=== The Rethymno Declaration ===
The Rethymno Declaration, adopted by the party in its 12th Congress of 2025, is its new official ideological manifesto, which supersedes the Uppsala Declaration. It complements its Statutes, as approved in 2025, and seeks to be a more concrete and coherent political and ideological document than the Uppsala Declaration, maintaining Pirate principles at its core.

It begins with a sharp criticism of the transnational and international Pirate institutions (PPEU and PPI) for their inaction and silence on serious incidents of backslide in press freedom, erosion of democracy and the rule of law, lack of government accountability in Greece, the Gaza genocide, as well as procedural abuses by the leaderships of the PPEU and PPI to prevent any actual political discourse from taking place.

It then presents what the party views as the "seven plagues" of the Pirate Movement, before proceeding to make the case for an independent and radical Pirate Movement, and puts forward eight axes of political mobilization, which are further expanded upon:

1. Human-Civil-Social Rights
2. Strengthening of Democracy and the Rule of Law – Improvement of Public Administration
3. Economic/Financial, Social, Gender, and Environmental Justice – Protection of Social Goods
4. Free and Equitable Access to Education for All
5. Digital, Intellectual, and Communication Rights
6. A New Economic Model
7. Active, Practical Opposition to Nationalism, Imperialism, and Militarism
8. The European Vision of the New Pirate Movement

Among its many provisions is the reinstatement of direct and participatory democracy among the party's principles and in its platform, calling for government (local and central) decisions to be made "through open, equitable, inclusive, participatory procedures." The party explicitly cites direct and participatory democracy as a prerequisite for strengthening democracy and the rule of law.

== Positions ==
=== Reproductive Rights ===
Driven by a rise in instances of Greek public hospitals refusing to perform abortions on grounds of doctors' conscientious objection, the party issued a sharp critique of the Greek Medical Code of Ethics in April 2024, in which it pointed at certain provisions which the party views as a targeted assault on women's reproductive rights, right to bodily autonomy, and couples' right to conduct their own family planning without coercion. In its statement, the party criticized what it views as a prioritization of doctors' religious views over women's needs. Aiming to address this issue, it proposed a comprehensive reform of the provisions in question, as well as the adoption of more inclusive and gender-neutral language, reversing the dynamic: the Pirates' proposal obliges the doctor to perform all legal medical procedures, placing "the health and well-being of the patient above their personal beliefs" and demanding that they "perform all lawful medical acts with conscientiousness, sensitivity, compassion, empathy, and responsibility, taking into account scientific evidence and the patient’s needs." It also proposes that the scope of the counseling w.r.t. abortion that the current Medical Code of Ethics mandates be strictly limited to "the protection of the health and well-being of the pregnant individual," with any kind of psychological or emotional pressure to the pregnant individual being explicitly and strictly prohibited. In July 2025, the party published the English translation of its proposal.

== Election results ==
=== Hellenic Parliament ===
Election	Hellenic Parliament					Rank	Government	Leader
Election	Votes	%	±pp	Seats won	+/−	Rank	Government	Leader
May 2012	32,519	0.51%	New	0 / 300	New	19th	Extra-parliamentary	Collective leadership
Jun 2012	14,170	0.23%	−0.28	0 / 300	0	15th	Extra-parliamentary	Collective leadership
Jan 2015	Did not contest			0 / 300	0	—N/a	Extra-parliamentary	Collective leadership
Sep 2015 (Note: Ran in coalition with Democrats and Society of Values.)	15,282	0.28%	+0.05	0 / 300	0	14th	Extra-parliamentary	Collective leadership
2019	Did not contest			0 / 300	0	—N/a	Extra-parliamentary	Collective leadership
May 2023	Did not contest			0 / 300	0	—N/a	Extra-parliamentary	Collective leadership
Jun 2023 (Note: Ran as part of the Green & Purple coalition.)	15,911	0.31%	+0.03	0 / 300	0	15th	Extra-parliamentary	Collective leadership
