= Volt Greece =

Political party in Greece

Volt Greece Βόλτ Ελλάδας
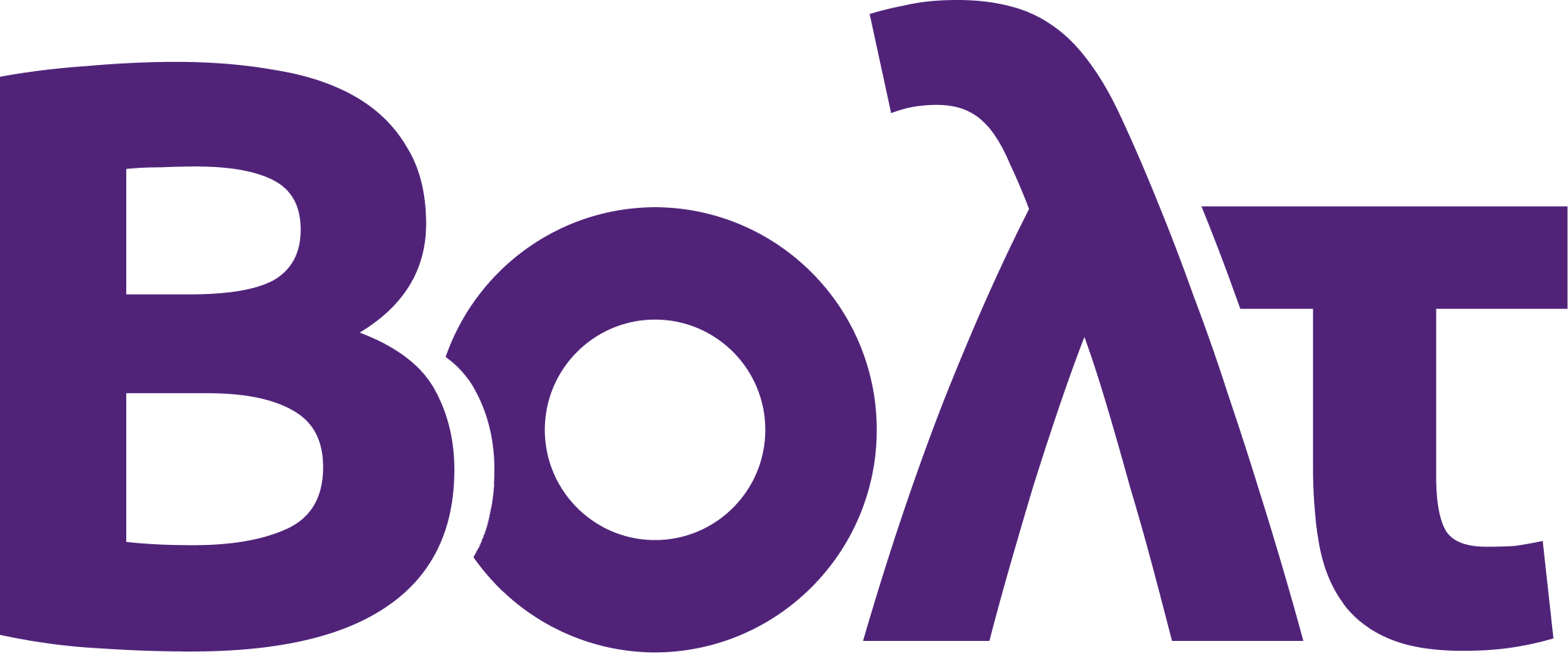
- Abbreviation: Βολτ/Volt
- President: Electra Rome Dochtsi; Evangelos Liaras
- Treasurer: Florents Bitri
- Founded: 2018
- Registered: 4 October 2022; 3 years ago
- Headquarters: Athens
- Ideology: Social liberalism Progressivism; Pro-Europeanism
- Political position: Centre
- National affiliation: Prasino+Mov (2022–2023)
- European political alliance: Volt Europa
- Colors: Purple

Website
- voltgreece.org

Volt Greece (Greek: Βόλτ Ελλάδας) is a social liberal political party in Greece and the Greek branch of Volt Europa.

== History ==
Volt Greece was founded in 2018. In July 2022, the group elected its first executive secretariat, with Nikolas Fournarakis and Olga Dourou as co-chairs, and Electra Rome Dochtsi as General Secretary. An ethics committee was also established, chaired by Demetrios Velis. The two bodies were tasked with preparing its establishment as a party. On 4 October 2022, the party was officially registered, becoming the 18th registered party of Volt Europa.

In December 2022, Volt co-founded the new political alliance Prasino & Mov (Greek: Πράσινο & Μωβ) together with other green parties.

National sections of Volt Europa. The borders of the European Union are shown in red

On 11 and 12 March, the party held its first founding congress in Athens and elected Nikolas Fournarakis and Theodora Famprikezi as co-presidents, and Konstantinos Kalafatakis as the General Secretary.

The party planned to contest the national parliamentary elections in May 2023 with the Prasino+Mov alliance but the alliance was disqualified from the election by the Supreme Court for lack of required documents. In the June 2023 parliamentary elections, the Prasino+Mov Alliance was admitted to the ballot and participated with 259 candidates in 59 constituencies (51 from Volt), marking Volt's first participation in an election in Greece. The alliance achieved 0.31% of the vote. On July 12, 2023, the party announced its decision to leave the alliance.

In the 2023 regional and local elections, the party officially supported lists in Athens, Pylaia-Chortiatis (with its own mayoral candidate), Thessaloniki, Patras, Larissa and Central Macedonia. In total, Volt won 5 seats. The party won one seat on the Athens Municipal Council and two more in the city's seventh district in the Athens Municipal Elections, as well as one seat in Pylaia-Chortiatis and one in Spata-Artemida. In December 2023, Volt local councillor Olga Dourou was elected deputy mayor of Athens, making her the second in Volt Europa after Federica Vinci in Isernia and the first in her party to hold such an office.

The party ran in the European elections 2024 with a joint list with Kosmos.

In November 2024, a General Assembly was conducted, where the vacant positions of the male co-president and General Secretary were filled by Evangelos Liaras and Electra Rome Dochtsi respectively.

During the months of March and April 2025, Volt Greece held its second Congress, in which the statute was reformed, Evangelos Liaras and Electra Rome Dochtsi were elected co-presidents, Florents Bitri was elected Treasurer, and the new bodies were elected.

== Policies ==
As part of the European network, Volt Greece follows a pan-European approach to many policy areas such as climate change, energy crises or the COVID-19 pandemic.

=== European reform ===
The party aims to create a European federation with geostrategic autonomy.

Volt wants to strengthen the European Parliament, a President elected by the European citizens and a unified European government led by a Prime Minister, with joint foreign, finance and economy ministries and a European army.

=== Social and health policy ===
Volt wants unemployment benefits to be gradually reduced after someone finds a job. This is to increase the incentive to work and reduce unregistered work. A universal basic income is to be gradually introduced to reduce poverty and a decentralised universal health care system is to be created for all inhabitants of the country.

Childcare centres are to be introduced throughout the country. Inequalities based on gender, sexual orientation, gender identity, religion and origin should be countered.

=== Economy ===
The party wants to modernise the Greek economy and aims to create more high value-added jobs. The aim is to increase productivity and reduce the unemployment rate to below 5%. The role of the European Central Bank is to be expanded to include the fight against unemployment.

=== Education ===
Volt aims to strengthen the autonomy of school institutions administratively, financially, pedagogically and academically.

The administrative structure of the Ministry of Education is to be decentralised and its central and regional departments subjected to performance evaluation.

=== Digitalisation ===
The party supports the use of open source software as an instrument of a transparent state and wants to digitise the state system and administration.

The fundamental right of (digital) privacy of correspondence should be strengthened.

=== Environmental and climate protection ===
Volt aims to significantly reduce greenhouse gas emissions in order to reduce the impact of climate change. Imported products are to be subject to a carbon tax in order to also achieve emission reductions in other regions of the world. Massive investments are to be made in public transport in order to achieve emission reductions in the transport sector. In addition, the energy sector is to be transformed through investments in renewable energy sources and storage. To this end, the party is striving for green growth in connection with the energy transition, the protection of biodiversity and sustainable environmental management.

=== Immigration and asylum policy ===
The party advocates a controlled admission of migrants and refugees and their integration, as a means of countering the demographic problem of Greece.

== Organisation ==
=== Leadership ===
The co-presidents and the Treasurer are directly elected by the party members during a General Assembly. The statute requires different gender identities for the chairpersons.

=== Executive Board ===
There is a six-member executive board, called the "Political Council" (the co-presidents and the Treasurer fully participate in this body ex officio, thus increasing the number of members to 9), which is responsible for implementation and administration in accordance with the decisions of the party's General Assembly and Council of the Members.

=== Council of the Members ===
The Council of the Members is a non-directly-elected body, whose members consist of party officials elected onto public office, and the co-ordinators of both regional groups and task groups.

=== Ethics Board ===
The five-member Ethics Board monitors compliance with the Statue, Rules of Procedure, the Code of Conduct, the decisions of the General Assemblies, the Council of the Members, the executive board and the Leadership of the party. It also serves as a conflict resolution body and facilitates proper in-party human resources management. The members of the Ethics Board are directly elected by the party members during a General Assembly.

=== Finances ===
The party is financed by membership fees but also donations.

=== Relationship with other organisations ===
Volt Greece is a member organisation of the Volt Europa movement and was a co-founder and a member of the Greek alliance Prasino+Mov.

== Election results ==
=== Hellenic Parliament ===
Election	Hellenic Parliament					Rank	Government	Leader
Election	Votes	%	±pp	Seats won	+/−	Rank	Government	Leader
Jun 2023 (Note: Run as part of the Prasino+Mov coalition.)	15,911	0.31%	New	0 / 300	New	15th	Extra-parliamentary	Nikolas Fournarakis; Theodora Famprikezi

=== European Parliament ===
Election	European Parliament					Rank	Leader
Election	Votes	%	±pp	Seats won	+/−	Rank	Leader
June 2024 (Note: Run via a common ballot with Kosmos.)	42,762	1.08%	New	0 / 21	New	13th	Nikolas Fournarakis; Stella Psarropoulou
