= Greens – Solidarity =

Greens – Solidarity Πράσινοι Prasinoi
- Leader: Nikos Chrysogelos
- Founded: 24 March 2014
- Dissolved: 25 February 2024
- Split from: Ecologist Greens
- Merged into: Greens-Ecology
- Ideology: Green politics
- Political position: Centre-left
- Parliament: 0 / 300
- European Parliament: 0 / 22

Website
- Official website

The Greens – Solidarity (Greek: Πράσινοι - Αλληλεγγύη, romanized: Prasinoi - Allilengii) was a Greek political party that supports the principles of political ecology. It was founded by MEP Nikos Chrysogelos after his retirement from the Ecologist Greens party.

The Party's founding purpose was their participation in the 2014 European Parliament election.

On 4 January 2015, it was announced that the party would cooperate with the Democratic Left in the January 2015 legislative election under the name "Greens – Democratic Left."

== Election results ==
=== Hellenic Parliament ===
Election	Hellenic Parliament					Rank	Government	Leader
Election	Votes	%	±pp	Seats won	+/−	Rank	Government	Leader
Jan 2015 (Note: Run in coalition with Democratic Left.)	29,820	0.48%	New	0 / 300	New	13th	Extra-parliamentary	Nikos Chrysogelos
Sep 2015	Did not contest			0 / 300	0	—	Extra-parliamentary	Nikos Chrysogelos
2019	Did not contest			0 / 300	0	—	Extra-parliamentary	Nikos Chrysogelos
May 2023	Did not contest			0 / 300	0	—	Extra-parliamentary	Nikos Chrysogelos
Jun 2023 (Note: Run as part of the Green & Purple coalition.)	15,911	0.31%	−0.17	0 / 300	0	15th	Extra-parliamentary	Nikos Chrysogelos
