= Vathy, Meganisi =

Town in Greece

Vathy Βαθύ
- Community
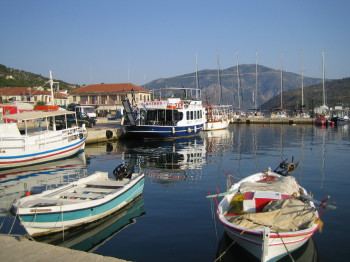
- Vathy Harbour

- Location within Greece
- Coordinates: 38°39′47″N 20°47′01″E
- Country: Greece
- Administrative region: Ionian Islands
- Regional unit: Lefkada
- Municipality: Meganisi

Population (2021)
  - Community: 177
- Time zone: UTC+2 (EET)
  - Summer (DST): UTC+3 (EEST)

Vathy (Greek: Βαθύ) is a town on the Greek Ionian island of Meganisi, which is part of the Lefkada regional unit. The Bay of Vathy in one of the world's largest natural harbors.
