= Katerina Papakosta =

Greek politician

Katerina Papakosta Κατερίνα Παπακώστα

Leader of the New Greek Momentum
- Incumbent
- Assumed office 20 July 2018

Personal details
- Born: 19 January 1961 (age 65) Piraeus, Greece
- Party: New Democracy (1988–2017); New Greek Momentum (2018–2019)
- Spouse: Theodoros Sidiropoulos
- Education: Aristotle University of Thessaloniki

Katerina Papakosta (Greek: Κατερίνα Παπακώστα, 19 January 1961) is a Greek politician and former MP. She is the president of the New Greek Momentum (NEO), while she had served as Deputy Minister of Civil Protection in the second cabinet of Alexis Tsipras in September 2015.

== Biography ==
=== Personal life and studies ===
Papakosta was born in 1961 in Piraeus. She studied at the Law School of the Aristotle University of Thessaloniki and specialized in Commercial and Tax Law. She is married to General Theodoros Sidiropoulos, with whom they have two children.

In addition to her native Greek, Papakosta speaks English, French, Italian and Turkish.

=== Political career ===
Papakosta had been a political figure of New Democracy since 1988, responsible for updating the political program. In 1990, she was a candidate for Mayor in Agia Varvara, while in 1997, she was elected a member of the Central Committee of New Democracy.

In the parliamentary elections of 2000, Papakosta was elected for the first time a deputy of Athens II, a position in which she was re-elected for two consecutive electoral contests (2004 and 2007). As a Member of Parliament, she was a member of the Standing Committee on Home Affairs, Public Administration, Public Order and Justice, the Standing Committee on Education, the Standing Committee on Social Affairs and the Special Standing Committee on European Affairs, of which she was first vice-chairman. She also participated in the Inter-Party Committee for the Examination of the Penitentiary System and the living conditions of the prisoners, in which he served as president. In May 2004, the prime minister and president of New Democracy, Kostas Karamanlis, appointed her Secretary of Women's Affairs, a position she held until September 2013. She is a member of the European Union of Women (EUW) and in 2006, she was elected Vice-President of Women's Organizations in the European People's Party (EPP-WOMEN). In 2012, she was elected president of the Women's Political Association.

Papakosta was elected in the May 2012 parliamentary elections and in the June elections. As a Member of Parliament, she was chair of the Special Standing Committee on Equality, Youth and Human Rights and a member of the Standing Committee on Public Administration, Public Order and Justice. In June 2014, Prime Minister Antonis Samaras appointed her Deputy Minister of Health, following a reshuffle in his government. She failed to get elected in the January 2015 elections, but was elected in the early elections in September. She was a member of the Standing Committee on Public Administration, Public Order and Justice and the Special Standing Committee on Equality, Youth and Human Rights.

In November 2016, Papakosta was appointed by the president of New Democracy, Kyriakos Mitsotakis, deputy minister of health, while in 2017 she was removed from her position and replaced by Iason Fotilas. On 26 October 2017, by decision of Mitsotakis, Papakosta was expelled from the parliamentary Group of the party.

On 20 July 2018, she founded the New Greek Momentum and on 29 August, she joined the Tsipras government, taking over the portfolio of the Deputy Minister of Civil Protection. In June 2019, her candidacy was announced in the 2019 parliamentary elections with SYRIZA in the B3 'Southern Sector region of Athens, however she was not elected.
