= Free Citizens =

Free Citizens Ελεύθεροι Πολίτες
- Founded: November 2011
- Split from: Panhellenic Citizen Chariot
- Headquarters: 2 King Konstantinos Ave., Kallimarmaro, Athens
- Ideology: Democratic socialism Social democracy
- Political position: Centre-left
- Colours: Red, green, orange, yellow
- Regions: 2 / 725

Website
- Official Website

Free Citizens (Greek: Ελεύθεροι Πολίτες) is a political party that was founded in November 2011 by the independent deputy Vasilis Oikonomou, who had voted "present" in the vote for the memorandum and afterwards was expelled from the parliamentary group of the Panhellenic Socialist Movement (PASOK), and other 250 people who withdrew from the political party Panhellenic Citizen Chariot.

Apart from parliament deputies and former ministers, personalities of the local self-government as well as representatives of the youth and social movements also take part in the organization.

On March 22, 2012, Vasilis Oikonomou joined the Democratic Left (DIMAR) party and is a member of the parliamentary group for Democratic Left party.

On October 4, 2012, V. Oikonomou and 100 other members of the party joined DIMAR as its members. On December 17, 2012, the majority of the party decided to expel V. Oikonomou and 26 more members and then announced the dissolution of its coalition with DIMAR.

The Free Citizens (Free Youth) is the party's youth organisation.
