= Prasino & Mov =

Green & Purple Πράσινο & Μωβ
- Leader: Vasiliki Grammatikogianni; Dominikos Kyriakos Chrysides
- Founded: 20 December 2022; 3 years ago
- Dissolved: 2023
- Headquarters: Athens
- Ideology: Green politics
- Colors: Green; Purple

Website
- prasinomov.gr

Prasino & Mov (Greek: Πράσινο & Μωβ, lit. 'Green & Purple') was a Greek party alliance of seven parties that was officially founded in December 2022. The alliance advocates for renewable energy, opposes fossil fuel exploration, and supports green and digital investments, railway expansion, and comprehensive European refugee integration policy. They contested in the 2023 parliamentary elections, securing around 0.3% of votes, winning no seats. In July 2023, Volt Greece left the alliance.

== History ==
The Alliance was founded by the parties Volt Greece, Ecology – Green Solution (Οικολογία – Πράσινη Λύση), Greens, Pirate Party of Greece, Greens – Solidarity, Greek Party for the Animals and the ecofeminist movement Kyklos. The alliance was officially presented on 20 December 2022.

The alliance planned to contest the 2023 parliamentary elections together until they were barred from running. However, the alliance did run in the parliamentary elections in June, after Mitsotakis called new elections. They secured around 0,3% of the votes, which wasn't enough to gain any seats in parliament. In July 2023, the Greek Party for the Animals and Volt Greece announced that they were leaving the Alliance.

== Policies ==
=== Energy and environment ===
Prasino & Mov is committed to promoting renewable energy.

The alliance opposes fossil fuel exploration, the construction of the EAST-MED pipeline and new gas-fired power plants, and plans for Greek funding of the new nuclear power plant in Kozloduy.

=== Economy ===
With investments in green and digital transformation, rural revitalisation, circular economy, promotion of small and medium enterprises, the aim is to boost the economy.

=== Transportation ===
The railway network should be expanded and given greater consideration in planning as a supplement to and substitute for car traffic.

=== Refugee policy ===
Prasino & Mov rejects the human rights violations and practices of turning back refugees and sees the need for a comprehensive European integration policy and legal channels of entry. To achieve this, a more federal Europe should be developed.

== Election results ==
=== Hellenic Parliament ===
Election	Hellenic Parliament					Rank	Government	Leader
Election	Votes	%	±pp	Seats won	+/−	Rank	Government	Leader
Jun 2023	15,911	0.31%	New	0 / 300	New	15th	Extra-parliamentary	Vasiliki Grammatikogianni; Dominikos Kyriakos Chrysides
