= Democratic Social Movement =

Greek political party

Democratic Social Movement Δημοκρατικό Κοινωνικό Κίνημα
- Abbreviation: DIKKI
- Founder: Dimitris Tsovolas
- Founded: 20 December 1995; 30 years ago
- Split from: Panhellenic Socialist Movement (PASOK)
- Ideology: Socialism; Social democracy Soft Euroscepticism; Left-wing nationalism
- Political position: Left-wing
- National affiliation: SYRIZA (2007–15); Popular Unity (2015–19); United Popular Front-Agricultural Livestock Party of Greece (2019–?); Free People (2021)

Website
- dikki.org

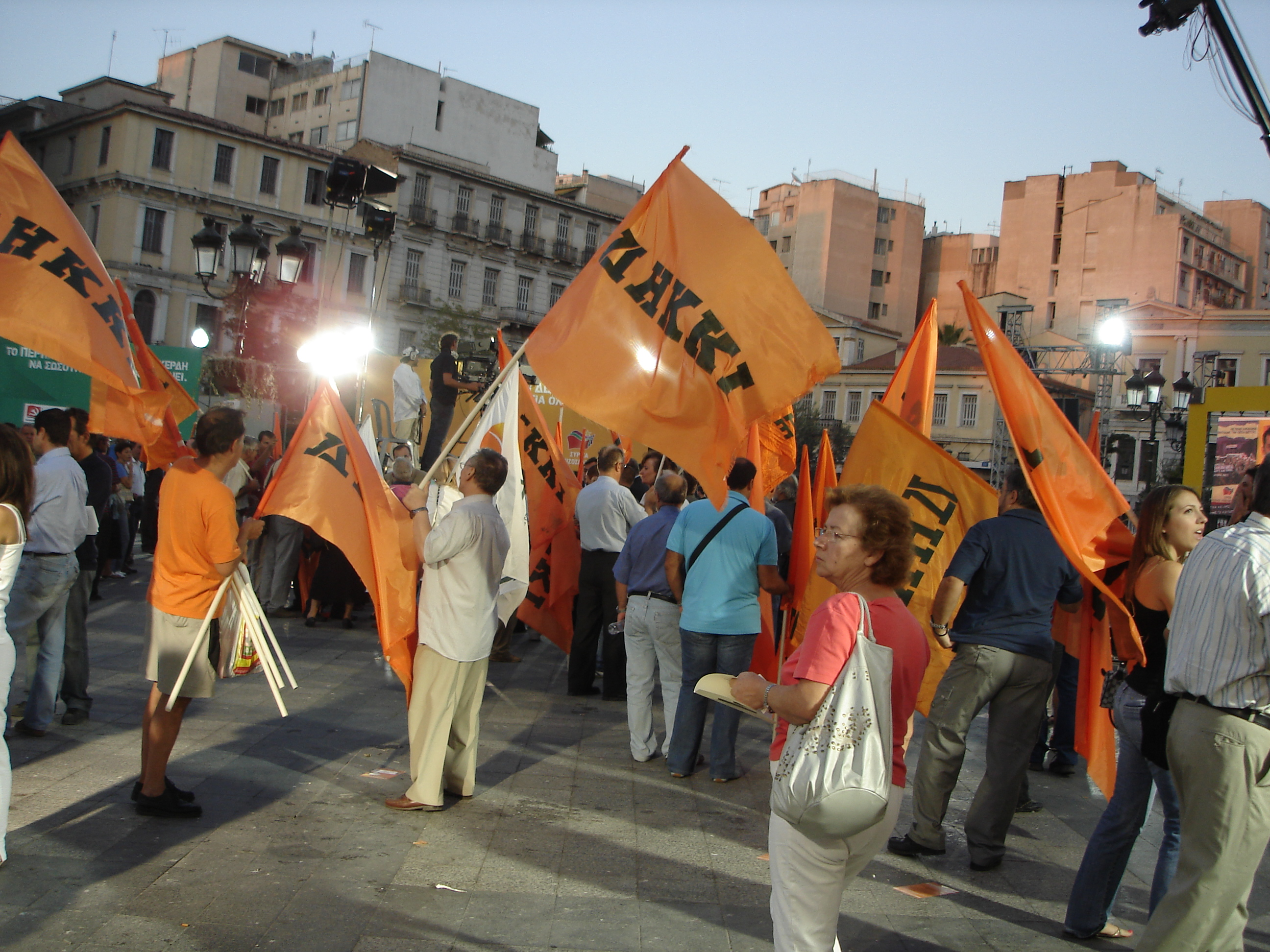
DIKKI supporters in a Coalition of the Radical Left rally in 2007

The Democratic Social Movement (Greek: Δημοκρατικό Κοινωνικό Κίνημα, ΔΗΚΚΙ; Dimokratiko Koinoniko Kinima, DIKKI) is a social-democratic political party in Greece. The party was founded in 1995 by Dimitris Tsovolas and several ex-members of the Panhellenic Socialist Movement (PASOK), the then ruling social-democratic party.

== History ==
=== Formation and early success ===
In the 1996 legislative election, DIKKI received 4.43% of the vote and 9 seats in the Hellenic Parliament. In the 1999 election to the European Parliament, the party received 6.85% of the vote and 2 seats in the European Parliament, and was a full member of the European United Left - Nordic Green Left group.

=== Failures and disputes ===
After these initial successes, however, DIKKI failed to elect members to the Hellenic Parliament on two consecutive elections; it received 2.69% of the vote in the 2000 legislative election and 1.8% of the vote in the 2004 legislative election.

After the 2004 election, Tsovolas unilaterally decided to dissolve DIKKI and give the party possessions away to the Greek state. That decision led to a conflict between the party leader and the National Committee, who voted against the dissolution; there are accusations that Tsovolas went through these actions, because he was planning to be readmitted in PASOK in the near future. The National Committee went to law and the court ruled that the party is legally administered by the national executive bodies, thus it cannot cease to exist unless the National Congress or the National Committee takes such decision. The party possessions were returned and Tsovolas was expelled.

=== Reorientation ===
In the local elections of 2006 DIKKI supported many tickets led by the Communist Party of Greece (KKE), and numerous party members (for the size of the party) were elected in local councils. Moreover, DIKKI participated in All Workers Militant Front (PAME), a trade unionist coordination centre closely related with KKE.

Although it was expected that co-operation between the two parties would become permanent, on August 22, 2007 DIKKI announced that it was participating in the Coalition of the Radical Left (SYRIZA), which received 5.04% of the vote in the legislative election held on September 16, 2007.

On February 20, 2015, the party announced it was severing ties with SYRIZA.

In the summer of 2015, it joined an alliance with Popular Unity. It would remain affiliated until June 2019, when it joined an electoral coalition with the United Popular Front and Agricultural Livestock Party of Greece.

In March 2021, it joined the Free People of George Trangas, from which it left a few months later.

== Electoral results ==
=== Parliament ===
Election year	# of overall votes	% of overall vote	# of seats won	+/-
1996	300.954	4.4 (#5)	9 / 300	
2000	184.598	2.7 (#5)	0 / 300	▼9
2004	132.933	1.8 (#6)	0 / 300	Steady

=== European Parliament ===
Election year	# of overall votes	% of overall vote	# of seats won	+/-
1999	440.191	4.7 (#4)	2 / 25	
