= Democrats (Greece, 2009) =

Democrats Δημοκρατικοί
- Leader: Theodoros Polyzoidis
- Founded: 2009
- Ideology: Fiscal conservatism Cultural liberalism Centrism
- Political position: Centre

The Democrats (Greek: Δημοκρατικοί) are a Greek political party founded in January 2009 in Athens and emblem the olive branch.

The political philosophy of the Democrats, according to the same party, based on the measure and is equally at both ends of the political spectrum reject dogmatism, obsessions and unilateralism.

The Democrats have applied to participate in elections, which was rejected by the Supreme Court and the party participated regularly in the national elections of 2009.

In 2011, participated as co-founders of the party Recreate Greece, whose ballots participated in the elections on May 6, 2012 and 17 June 2012 to 44 candidates, continuing the fraternal relations with the party of Thanos Tzimeros. A few months later Democrats disagreed with Thanos Tzimeros and broke away.

== Background and objectives ==
The Democrats came from open procedures online consultation and dialogue between citizens.

=== Core objectives ===
According to the declarations of the party's central objectives are:

1. Radical separation of powers
2. Eliminating patronage system
3. The abolition of nepotism
4. The continuous and direct involvement of citizens in governing the country

=== The main priorities ===
According to the party, the main priorities are:

1. Support of motherhood, women's, youth and family
2. Environmental protection and enhancement of public space,
3. Minimizing the state's role as an entrepreneur and enhance the supervisory and regulatory role.

Suggested an economic system that promotes healthy entrepreneurship in a context governed by rules and controls combined with a powerful and efficient welfare state. The creation of a model that combines both the development of employment and environmental protection, social cohesion on the other hand with technological progress.

== See also ==
- Democrats (Greece, 2024)
