= Democrats (Greece, 2024) =

Democrats Δημοκράτες
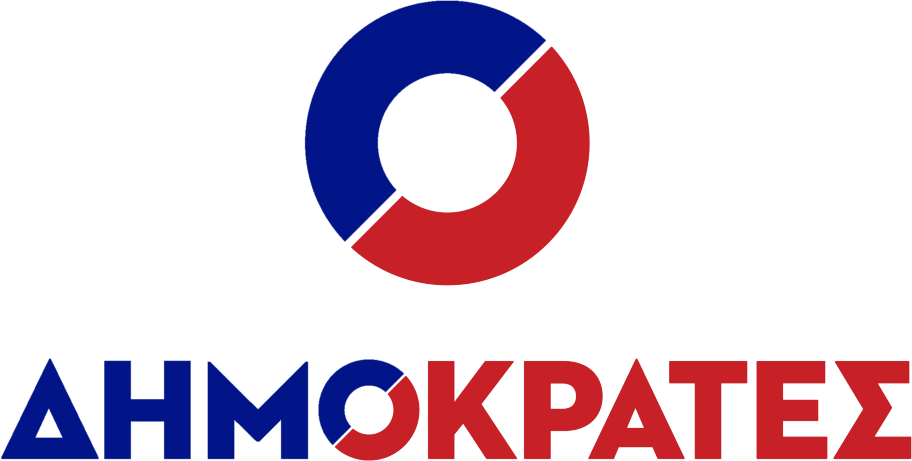
- President: Andreas Loverdos
- Vice President: Theodoros Papatheodorou
- Press Spokesperson: Tatiana Douvara
- Founder: Andreas Loverdos
- Founded: 7 February 2024
- Dissolved: 16 September 2025
- Split from: PASOK – Movement for Change
- Merged into: New Democracy
- Headquarters: Akadimias 60, Athens
- Ideology: Liberalism; Pro-Europeanism
- Political position: Centre
- European Parliament group: Renew Europe
- Colours: Blue Red

Website
- dimokrates.net

The Democrats (Greek: Δημοκράτες, romanized: Dimokrátes) was a Greek political party founded in 2024 by former PASOK–KINAL politician Andreas Loverdos.

It described itself as a "patriotic, popular, politically liberal, modernizing, reformist, digital and pluralist" party.

== History ==
On 7 February 2024, Andreas Loverdos filed the necessary documents and supporting documents for the establishment of the party, at the Supreme Civil and Criminal Court. On 4 March 2024, the new party was presented through a Loverdos' video message from Evros.

On 20 March 2024, in Brussels, it was announced that the party had joined the European parliamentary group Renew Europe, after a meeting of party officials with the RE leader Valérie Hayer.

On 21 March 2024, Panagiotis Konsoulas was elected by the temporary Political Committee of the party as the first Secretary of the party. On 26 March, it was announced that the criminologist Tatiana Douvara took over as Press Spokesperson, while a day later it was announced that the president of the Athens Central Fish Market, Vassilis Simos, took over as Political Spokesperson.

On 28 March 2024, the former Hellenic Parliament member of the Democratic Alignment and PASOK–KINAL, Theodoros Papatheodorou, took over as vice president of the party.

On 9 June 2024, in the 2024 European Parliament election, the party failed to elect an MEP, underperforming compared to opinion polls and taking 1.45% of the vote.

The party was disestablished on 16 September 2025, when its members joined the governing New Democracy.

== Election results ==
=== European Parliament election ===
European Parliament
Election	Votes	%	±pp	Seats won	+/−	Rank	Leader	EP Group
2024	57,496	1.45%	New	0 / 21	New	11th	Andreas Loverdos	−

== See also ==
- Democrats (Greece, 2009)
