= Free People (Greece) =

Free People Ελεύθεροι Άνθρωποι
- Abbreviation: KELAN
- Leader: Paris Kourtzidis
- Founder: Giorgos Tragas
- Founded: 8 February 2021
- Dissolved: 2023
- Ideology: Right-wing populism National conservatism Euroscepticism
- Political position: Right-wing to far-right
- National affiliation: Greek Overthrow
- Colours: Cyan
- Hellenic Parliament: 0 / 300

Website
- kelan.gr

The Free People (Greek: Ελεύθεροι Άνθρωποι or Κίνημα Ελευθέρων Ανθρώπων, Κ.ΕΛ.ΑΝ.; KELAN) was a political party founded in February 2021 by journalist Giorgos Tragas.

== History ==
Giorgos Tragas founded the party in February 2021 in the middle of a lockdown due to COVID-19. The purpose of the party was, according to Tragas, to ensure democracy, and to fight against unemployment and against the economic crisis that emerged from the lockdown due to the COVID-19 pandemic.

According to President Tragas, the party transcended the divisions of the political spectrum and was not placed on this axis, but was characterized by patriotism and multi-collectivity.

A few days after the founding of the party, the inclusion of numerous parties was announced on the ballots of the Free People, such as the Christian Democratic Party of the Overthrow of Nikolaos Nikolopoulos, the Victory Front of Rachel Makris, the United Popular Front of Dimitris Kazakis and others.

Tragas died due to COVID-19 complications on 14 December 2021.
