= Loverdos =

Loverdos (Greek: Λοβέρδος) is a Greek surname. The surname derives from Lombardy. Notable people with the surname include:

- Andreas Loverdos (born 1956), Greek politician
