= Opinion polling for the 2019 Greek parliamentary election =

In the run up to the 2019 Greek parliamentary election, various organizations carried out opinion polling to gauge voting intention in Greece during the term of the 17th Hellenic Parliament. Results of such polls are displayed in this article. The date range for these opinion polls is from the previous parliamentary election, held on 20 September 2015, to the day the next election was held, on 7 July 2019.

Polls are listed in reverse chronological order, showing the most recent first and using the dates when the survey fieldwork was done, as opposed to the date of publication. Where the fieldwork dates are unknown, the date of publication is given instead. The highest percentage figure in each polling survey is displayed with its background shaded in the leading party's colour. If a tie ensues, this is applied to the figures with the highest percentages. The "Lead" columns on the right shows the percentage-point difference between the parties with the highest percentages in a given poll.

== Voting intention estimates ==
=== Graphical summary ===
Local regression trend line of poll results from 20 September 2015 to 7 July 2019, with each line corresponding to a political party.

=== Polling ===
The table below lists nationwide voting intention estimates. Refusals are generally excluded from the party vote percentages, while question wording and the treatment of "don't know" responses and those not intending to vote may vary between polling organisations. Polls that show their results without disregarding those respondents who were undecided or said they would abstain from voting (either physically or by voting blank) have been re-calculated by disregarding these numbers from the totals offered through a simple rule of three in order to obtain results comparable to other polls and the official election results. When available, seat projections are displayed below the percentages in a smaller font. 151 seats are required for an absolute majority in the Hellenic Parliament.

Color key:

Exit poll

Polling firm/Commissioner	Fieldwork date	Sample size	Syriza	ND	XA	DISI	KKE	Potami	ANEL	EK	LAE	ANT	PE	EL	KINAL	MeRA25	Lead
2019 parliamentary election	7 Jul 2019	—	31.5; 86	39.9; 158	2.9; 0	(Note: The Democratic Coalition (DISI) and The River (Potami) merged in late 2017 to form the Movement for Change (KINAL).)	5.3; 15	–	–	1.2; 0	0.3; 0	0.4; 0	1.5; 0	3.7; 10	8.1; 22	3.4; 9	8.4
Pulse–Alco–Marc–MRB–Metron	7 Jul 2019 (21:00)	?	29.0– 32.0	38.0– 41.0	2.7– 3.4		5.0– 6.0	–	–	1.0– 2.0	–	–	1.0– 2.0	3.5– 4.5	7.0– 9.0	2.8– 3.8	9.0
Singular Logic (Note: Quick count.)	7 Jul 2019 (20:45)	?	31.6; 86	39.8; 158	2.9; 0		5.3; 14	–	–	–	–	–	1.4; 0	3.7; 10	8.3; 23	3.4; 9	8.2
Pulse–Alco–Marc–MRB–Metron	7 Jul 2019 (20:00)	?	27.0– 30.0	38.5– 41.5	2.8– 3.8		5.0– 6.0	–	–	1.0– 2.0	–	–	1.0– 2.0	2.8– 3.5	6.5– 8.0	3.0– 4.0	11.5
Pulse–Alco–Marc–MRB–Metron	7 Jul 2019 (19:00)	?	26.5– 30.5; 77/82	38.0– 42.0; 155/167	2.8– 4.8; 0/13		5.0– 7.0; 16/19	–	–	1.0– 2.0; 0	–	–	1.0– 2.0; 0	2.5– 4.5; 0/13	6.0– 8.0; 19/22	3.0– 5.0; 8/14	11.5
Kapa Research/Ethnos	1–5 Jul 2019	1,241	28.0	40.0	3.9		5.4	–	–	1.5	–	–	1.5	3.1	7.3	3.4	12.0
Marc/ΑΝΤ1	2–4 Jul 2019	1,412	27.5; 70/82	38.9; 151/165	3.6; 0/13		5.5; 12/18	–	–	1.2; 0	–	–	1.9; 0	3.9; 0/14	7.0; 16/24	3.7; 0/13	11.4
MRB/Star	1–4 Jul 2019	1,205	28.5; 77/84	38.8; 155/164	3.9; 0/11		5.7; 16/17	–	–	2.4; 0	–	–	1.7; 0	3.4; 0/9	7.8; 21/23	4.1; 0/11	10.3
Rass/Action24	1–4 Jul 2019	?	27.7	39.4	2.7		5.9	–	–	2.0	–	–	1.8	3.2	8.2	3.0	11.7
Pulse RC/Skai	2–3 Jul 2019	1,206	30.3; 81/84	38.9; 155/159	4.3; 12		5.4; 14/15	–	–	1.6; 0	–	–	1.6; 0	3.2; 0/9	7.6; 20/21	3.2; 0/9	8.6
Interview/Vergina TV	1–3 Jul 2019	1,005	25.1; 77	35.7; 160	4.3; 13		5.3; 16	–	–	1.7; 0	–	–	–	4.0; 12	7.2; 22	2.4; 0	10.6
Public Issue	18 Jun–3 Jul 2019	1,003	27.0; 66/80	42.5; 158/172	3.5; 0/12		5.5; 12/18	–	–	2.0; 0	–	–	–	3.0; 0/11	8.0; 18/26	3.0; 0/11	15.5
Alco/Open TV	28 Jun–2 Jul 2019	1,000	27.8; 74/84	38.9; 155/165	4.1; 10/12		4.9; 14/16	–	–	1.6; 0	–	–	1.5; 0	3.6; 0/11	8.0; 21/24	3.0; 0/11	11.1
ProRata/Newpost	28 Jun–1 Jul 2019	1,000	26.5	39.5	3.6		5.5	–	–	–	–	–	–	3.2	7.0	3.2	13.0
Metron Analysis/Alpha TV	27 Jun–1 Jul 2019	?	29.2; 79	38.6; 155	4.0; 11		5.2; 14	–	–	2.0; 0	–	–	1.7; 0	3.4; 9	7.5; 20	4.5; 12	9.4
Rass/in.gr	24–27 Jun 2019	1,002	28.7	38.8	3.5		6.7	–	–	1.4	–	–	–	3.7	9.5	3.1	10.1
MRB/Ta Nea	24–26 Jun 2019	?	29.0; 80/87	37.9; 155/163	3.8; 10/11		5.0; 14/15	–	–	2.3; 0	–	–	1.3; 0	3.7; 0/10	8.1; 22/24	3.3; 0/9	8.9
Interview/Politik	24–26 Jun 2019	1,005	28.5	39.1	4.6		5.2	–	–	1.7	–	–	–	4.5	7.5	2.8	10.6
Pulse RC/Skai	24–26 Jun 2019	1,504	29.0; 78/85	39.0; 155/164	4.3; 12/13		5.4; 15/16	–	–	1.6; 0	–	–	1.1; 0	3.8; 0/10	7.6; 20/22	3.8; 0/10	10.0
Marc/ΑΝΤ1	19–23 Jun 2019	?	27.0; 75	38.3; 156	3.7; 10		5.7; 16	–	–	1.3; 0	–	–	1.6; 0	3.7; 10	8.0; 22	3.9; 11	11.3
Metron Analysis/To Vima	18–22 Jun 2019	?	29.5; 87	38.5; 164	3.5; 10		5.2; 15	–	–	2.5; 0	–	–	1.0; 0	2.8; 0	8.0; 24	2.5; 0	9.0
ProRata/Newpost	18–20 Jun 2019	1,000	27.5	40.0	4.0		5.0	–	–	1.0	–	–	1.0	3.0	7.5	3.5	12.5
Interview/Vergina TV	18–20 Jun 2019	1,000	26.5	37.6	3.9		5.8	–	–	1.8	–	–	–	4.6	7.2	3.0	11.1
Opinion Poll/The TOC	17–19 Jun 2019	1,302	27.0	39.8	3.3		4.6	–	–	1.1	–	–	2.3	3.6	6.4	4.1	12.8
Alco/Open TV	13–19 Jun 2019	1,000	27.3; 71/81	38.1; 149/161	4.5; 10/15		5.6; 12/16	–	–	1.3; 0	–	–	2.1; 0	3.5; 0/10	7.6; 18/22	4.1; 0/12	10.8
Pulse RC/Skai	18–19 Jun 2019	1,221	29.5; 79/82	38.0; 152/156	5.0; 13/14		6.0; 16/17	–	–	1.5; 0	–	–	1.5; 0	3.5; 0/9	7.5; 21	4.0; 0/10	8.5
Pulse RC/Skai	10–12 Jun 2019	1,356	28.5; 77/80	38.0; 152/156	5.5; 15		6.0; 16/17	–	–	1.0; 0	–	–	–	3.5; 0/9	7.5; 21	4.0; 0/10	9.5
MRB/Star	10–12 Jun 2019	1,003	28.0	37.0	5.4		6.0	–	–	2.1	–	–	–	3.0	7.3	4.0	9.0
Metron Analysis/Alpha TV	3–5 Jun 2019	1,203	29.6; 82	39.8; 162	4.7; 13		4.8; 13	–	–	–	–	–	1.3; 0	2.5; 0	7.7; 22	3.6; 10	10.2
Pulse RC/Skai	30 May–1 Jun 2019	1,358	26.5	36.5	5.5		6.0	1.5	–	1.5	–	–	1.5	4.5	8.5	3.0	10.0
2019 EP election	26 May 2019	—	23.8	33.1	4.9		5.4	1.5	0.8	1.5	0.6	0.6	1.6	4.2	7.7	3.0	9.3
Vox Pop Analysis/neaselida.gr	24 May 2019	?	32.0	33.2	7.0		4.5	1.3	–	1.5	–	–	1.2	2.2	5.5	2.4	1.2
Rass/Action24	15–17 May 2019	1,003	26.4	36.0	7.3		7.6	–	1.7	3.0	–	–	–	2.4	9.9	–	9.6
MRB/Star	6–8 May 2019	?	27.3	36.2	7.3		6.9	1.9	–	2.8	–	–	–	2.0	7.5	–	8.9
Palmos Analysis/tvxs	23–25 Apr 2019	1,004	28.5	34.0	5.5		7.5	1.5	1.0	3.0	–	1.8	–	3.5	9.0	–	5.5
Opinion Poll/Théma 104.6	15–17 Apr 2019	1,204	21.8	40.6	6.7		6.3	1.7	0.4	2.3	1.6	–	1.4	3.2	7.1	1.3	18.8
Interview/Vergina TV	15–17 Apr 2019	1,005	25.4	36.8	8.7		7.0	1.4	1.5	2.4	1.6	–	1.7	2.9	8.1	0.6	11.4
Metron Analysis/Alpha TV (Note: Includes two scenarios. Scenario A is based on an even distribution of undecided voters among all parties. Scenario B is based on a distribution of undecided voters based on their 2015 vote.)	15–17 Apr 2019	1,200	28.8; 85	35.4; 154	6.2; 18		6.1; 18	2.1; 0	1.8; 0	2.8; 0	1.2; 0	–	–	2.9; 0	8.4; 25	–	6.6
Metron Analysis/Alpha TV	15–17 Apr 2019	1,200	27.3; 76	37.5; 154	6.7; 19		6.4; 18	2.0; 0	1.3; 0	2.2; 0	–	–	–	3.1; 9	8.7; 24	–	10.2
MRB/Star	1–3 Apr 2019	1,003	27.4	37.3	7.3		7.2	1.6	1.2	2.4	–	1.2	–	2.7	7.6	–	9.9
Marc/Proto Thema	26 Mar–1 Apr 2019	1,200	25.9	37.1	7.1		6.4	1.3	–	3.1	1.2	–	1.2	3.1	7.8	1.8	11.2
Rass/in.gr	26–28 Mar 2019	1,005	25.3	35.9	8.3		8.5	–	1.7	3.3	–	–	–	2.0	10.7	–	10.6
Pulse RC/Skai	23–27 Mar 2019	1,452	25.5	36.5	8.5		6.5	1.5	1.5	2.0	1.5	1.0	1.5	2.5	8.5	–	11.0
Vox Pop Analysis/Documento	18–20 Mar 2019	1,000	31.8	34.4	8.8		5.0	0.9	0.5	0.8	–	–	–	–	6.5	–	2.6
Metron Analysis/To Vima	18–20 Mar 2019	1,204	26.0; 77	36.8; 160	7.5; 22		6.2; 19	1.5; 0	1.4; 0	1.8; 0	1.7; 0	–	–	2.1; 0	7.4; 22	–	10.8
Pulse RC/Skai	24–26 Feb 2019	1,323	24.5	37.0	9.0		7.0	1.0	1.0	2.5	1.0	–	1.5	3.0	8.0	–	12.5
Alco/Open TV	18–23 Feb 2019	1,000	25.0	32.8	7.3		7.0	1.8	1.9	3.7	3.6	–	–	1.9	5.7	–	7.8
Public Issue	1–14 Feb 2019	1,002	24.5; 60/77	39.0; 150/170	7.5; 17/25		6.5; 15/21	1.0; 0	1.0; 0	1.5; 0	–	–	–	3.0; 0/11	8.5; 18/30	–	14.5
Interview/Vergina TV	4–5 Feb 2019	1,000	24.7	36.7	7.5		6.5	1.4	1.7	2.8	1.6	–	1.5	3.3	6.1	–	12.0
ProRata/EfSyn	1–4 Feb 2019	1,000	29.5	36.5	8.5		6.5	0.5	0.0	2.0	0.5	1.0	1.0	3.0	7.5	0.5	7.0
Metron Analysis/To Vima	1–2 Feb 2019	1,205	25.1	37.2	9.1		6.1	1.9	1.3	2.7	1.5	1.3	–	2.8	7.0	–	12.1
Vox Pop Analysis/Documento	28–29 Jan 2019	7.536	31.9	34.3	10.7		4.1	0.8	1.0	2.2	1.0	–	1.5	2.6	5.6	–	2.4
Rass/in.gr	21–24 Jan 2019	1,004	25.2	36.6	8.4		8.6	–	1.9	2.8	–	–	–	1.8	10.3	–	11.4
Pulse RC/Skai	20–22 Jan 2019	1,326	26.0	38.0	9.0		6.5	1.0	1.0	2.0	1.0	–	1.0	2.0	7.5	–	12.0
Marc/Proto Thema	14–17 Jan 2019	1,002	26.9; 78	37.3; 158	7.5; 22		6.9; 20	2.2; 0	1.7; 0	2.7; 0	1.4; 0	1.1; 0	–	2.6; 0	7.5; 22	–	10.4
Opinion Poll	10–16 Jan 2019	1,000	22.2	42.5	5.8		5.5	1.0	0.5	2.0	1.7	–	2.0	2.9	5.1	–	20.3
Pulse RC/Skai	16–18 Dec 2018	1,359	26.0	38.0	8.0		7.0	1.5	1.5	2.0	–	1.0	–	2.0	8.0	–	12.0
Alco/Open TV	5–10 Dec 2018	1,000	25.4	32.8	8.6		7.4	1.5	2.4	2.3	3.4	–	–	2.4	6.4	–	7.4
MRB/Real.gr	28 Nov–6 Dec 2018	2,000	27.6	37.1	8.1		7.1	1.7	1.7	2.7	–	1.2	–	1.5	8.1	–	9.5
Kapa Research/thebest.gr	4–6 Dec 2018	1,004	25.7	31.7	10.0		7.4	1.9	2.8	2.9	1.6	1.4	–	2.3	8.1	–	6.0
Palmos Analysis/tvxs	20–23 Nov 2018	1,025	28.5	34.0	7.5		6.5	2.5	1.5	3.5	–	–	–	2.0	6.5	–	5.5
Metron Analysis/Ta Nea	19–21 Nov 2018	1,205	26.9	37.8	7.2		6.3	2.5	1.3	2.4	–	–	–	2.0	6.9	–	10.9
Pulse RC/Skai	18–20 Nov 2018	1,354	25.5	36.5	8.5		7.5	2.0	2.0	2.5	1.0	–	–	2.0	9.0	–	11.0
Public Issue	6–16 Nov 2018	1,000	22.0; 56/74	38.5; 154/174	7.0; 16/25		7.5; 18/26	2.0; 0	2.0; 0	2.0; 0	–	–	–	–	9.5; 22/34	–	16.5
Marc/Proto Thema	22–24 Oct 2018	1,002	23.7; 71	36.8; 160	7.6; 22		7.3; 22	2.3; 0	1.5; 0	2.8; 0	1.5; 0	–	–	2.2; 0	8.4; 25	–	13.1
Rass/Action24	15–18 Oct 2018	1,004	24.2	35.6	8.7		8.4	–	2.5	3.2	–	–	–	1.3	11.5	–	11.4
Pulse RC/Skai	14–16 Oct 2018	1,355	25.0	38.0	9.0		7.5	2.0	2.0	2.0	1.0	–	–	2.5	8.5	–	13.0
Palmos Analysis/tvxs	18–21 Sep 2018	1,016	28.0	34.0	5.5		6.0	2.5	1.5	2.5	–	–	–	–	8.0	–	6.0
Metron Analysis/Ta Nea	18–20 Sep 2018	1,000	25.2	36.9	6.0		6.7	2.3	1.3	3.2	1.6	–	1.6	1.4	8.1	–	11.7
MRB/Star	17–19 Sep 2018	1,004	27.0	37.7	7.3		7.2	1.2	1.8	3.2	–	1.3	–	1.6	7.9	–	10.7
Alco/Kontra Channel	17–19 Sep 2018	1,000	25.8	33.3	8.0		7.5	1.7	2.6	2.9	2.5	1.8	–	1.5	6.5	–	7.5
Kapa Research/Ethnos	17–18 Sep 2018	1,005	25.2	31.4	10.1		7.1	1.7	3.2	2.9	2.0	1.5	–	1.9	8.5	–	6.2
Pulse RC/Skai	16–18 Sep 2018	1,354	26.0	38.0	9.0		7.0	2.0	2.0	2.5	1.0	–	–	2.5	8.0	–	12.0
Vox Pop Analysis/Documento	12–14 Sep 2018	?	29.6	33.6	9.2		4.6	0.5	0.7	1.5	1.1	–	1.1	3.0	6.4	–	4.0
ProRata/EfSyn	11–12 Sep 2018	1,000	26.5	34.5	8.5		6.5	3.0	1.5	2.0	2.0	–	–	2.0	10.0	–	8.0
Marc/Proto Thema	8 Sep 2018	?	23.2; 67	36.4; 156	8.4; 24		7.3; 21	1.8; 0	1.4; 0	3.1; 9	1.7; 0	1.5; 0	–	2.5; 0	7.8; 23	–	13.2
Public Issue	2–12 Jul 2018	1,009	22.5; 55/72	38.0; 148/168	7.5; 17/25		7.5; 17/25	2.5; 0	2.5; 0	3.0; 0/12	–	–	–	–	9.5; 21/33	–	15.5
Vox Pop Analysis/Documento	7 Jul 2018	?	27.2	32.5	9.7		6.6		1.3	2.5	–	–	–	–	8.5	–	5.3
Kapa Research/Ethnos	25 Jun–2 Jul 2018	?	23.4	30.6	11.4		7.5		2.6	3.4	2.0	1.3	–	2.8	9.1	–	7.2
MRB/Real.gr	22–29 Jun 2018	2,000	25.2	36.8	8.4		6.9		2.1	3.4	–	1.2	–	1.3	10.6	–	11.6
Metron Analysis/Ta Nea	26–28 Jun 2018	1,000	22.6	36.7	8.0		6.8		2.0	3.2	–	–	1.6	2.8	9.9	–	14.1
Alco/Kontra Channel	23–27 Jun 2018	1,000	23.6	32.5	7.5		8.5		1.5	3.6	2.5	1.7	–	2.1	7.4	1.6	8.9
Pulse RC/Skai	24–26 Jun 2018	1,323	24.5	39.0	8.5		7.0		2.0	2.9	1.0	1.0	1.0	2.0	8.5	–	14.5
Marc/Proto Thema	13–15 Jun 2018	1,000	20.1; 57	37.9; 158	9.0; 26		7.8; 22		2.1; 0	3.4; 10	2.0; 0	1.4; 0	–	2.1; 0	9.3; 27	–	17.8
Rass/Action 24	29–31 May 2018	1,002	23.7	36.2	8.5		8.3		3.0	3.4	–	–	–	–	11.8	–	12.5
Alco/Kontra Channel	16–20 May 2018	1,000	25.1	32.0	8.7		7.5		2.2	2.9	2.6	1.6	–	1.6	8.0	1.5	6.9
Pulse RC/Skai	13–15 May 2018	1,341	25.0	37.0	9.0		7.0		2.5	2.5	1.0	1.0	1.0	1.5	9.0	–	12.0
Public Issue	23 Apr–7 May 2018	1,003	20.0; 48/65	39.0; 150/170	8.5; 20/28		6.5; 14/23		1.5; 0	3.5; 0/13	–	–	–	–	11.0; 26/37	–	19.0
Metron Analysis/Ta Nea	21 Apr 2018	?	23.3	36.3	7.1		6.7		2.5	3.3	1.5	–	2.3	1.6	9.0	1.4	13.0
Pulse RC/Skai	15–17 Apr 2018	1,356	24.5	36.0	9.0		7.5		2.5	2.5	–	1.0	–	1.5	10.5	–	11.5
Alco/News247	11–16 Apr 2018	1,000	24.5	31.4	8.8		6.3		2.6	2.6	3.7	–	1.9	–	7.9	–	6.9
Palmos Analysis/tvxs	12–15 Apr 2018	1,009	25.5	32.5	7.5		8.5		2.5	3.0	–	–	–	–	9.5	–	7.0
Kapa Research/Ethnos	3 Apr 2018	8,000	22.6	28.4	10.3		8.3		3.3	3.0	2.0	1.6	1.8	2.2	10.3	1.6	5.8
Marc/Proto Thema	23 Mar 2018	?	22.7	35.3	8.9		7.8		2.1	3.2	2.1	–	1.3	1.3	9.8	–	12.6
Pulse RC/Skai	11–13 Mar 2018	1,304	24.5	36.0	9.0		7.0		2.5	2.5	–	1.0	1.0	1.0	10.0	–	11.5
Rass/Action24	6–8 Mar 2018	1,002	23.4	35.8	8.8		7.7		3.0	3.3	–	–	–	–	12.4	–	12.4
Pulse RC/Dimokratia	3 Mar 2018	?	25.0	35.5	9.5		7.0		2.5	2.5	1.0	1.0	2.5	1.0	9.5	–	10.5
Opinion Poll/Paraskhnio	3 Mar 2018	?	25.6	38.7	7.0		7.1		1.2	2.9	2.6	–	–	–	9.1	–	13.1
Alco/Ethnos	22–24 Feb 2018	1,000	24.7	32.0	10.3		7.5		3.0	2.7	3.0	–	1.3	–	9.3	–	7.3
Metron Analysis/To Vima	12–23 Feb 2018	2,300	25.2	34.9	9.4		7.0		2.5	3.0	1.9	–	–	1.5	8.4	–	9.7
Pulse RC/Action24	25–29 Jan 2018	1,518	24.0	36.5	9.5		6.5		2.5	2.5	1.0	1.0	1.0	1.0	10.5	–	12.5
Metron Analysis/Ta Nea	20 Jan 2018	?	24.9	35.4	6.6		6.9		2.7	3.2	–	1.3	2.7	1.9	9.8	–	10.5
Alco/News247	16–18 Jan 2018	1,000	25.0	32.7	9.3		7.3		2.9	2.6	4.0	–	–	–	9.7	–	7.7
Public Issue	8–18 Jan 2018	1,010	21.5; 53/70	37.0; 148/165	8.0; 19/28		7.5; 17/26	1.0; 0	2.0; 0/9	2.5; 0/10	–	–	–	–	13.0; 30/44	–	15.5
Marc/Proto Thema	13 Jan 2018	?	22.9; 65	35.2; 150	8.1; 23		7.7; 22		2.9; 0	3.4; 9	2.2; 0	–	1.5; 0	–	11.0; 31	–	12.3
Pulse RC/bankingnews.gr	8–10 Jan 2018	1,207	25.0	36.5	8.5		6.5		2.5	2.5	–	–	–	–	10.0	–	11.5
Alco/News247	15–18 Dec 2017	1,000	24.4	32.5	8.6		7.5		3.0	3.0	3.7	–	–	–	11.2	–	8.1
PAMAK/Skai	13–15 Dec 2017	1,058	21.0	35.5	9.0		7.5		2.5	3.0	2.0	2.5	1.0	–	11.0	–	14.5
MRB/Real.gr	1–8 Dec 2017	2,000	24.4	35.2	7.8		7.5		2.5	3.2	1.1	2.4	1.7	–	11.6	–	10.8
Kapa Research	13 Nov–6 Dec 2017	12,783	22.9	29.4	9.6		8.0		3.2	3.0	2.3	1.5	1.9	–	11.7	–	6.5
Opinion Poll/iefimerida	28 Nov–4 Dec 2017	1,010	21.0	37.7	5.7		7.8		1.3	3.0	0.9	0.5	1.3	–	11.5	–	16.7
Metron Analysis/Ta Nea	20–25 Nov 2017	1,000	24.1	35.6	7.4	12.5	6.0	1.5	2.6	3.1	–	–	2.3	–	–	–	11.5
PAMAK/Skai	15–16 Nov 2017	1,112	22.0	36.5	8.5	10.0	7.5	0.5	2.0	2.5	–	–	–	–	–	–	14.5
Alco/Newsit	12–14 Nov 2017	1,000	23.4	31.9	8.8	7.5	7.0	2.6	2.8	2.8	3.6	–	1.4	–	–	–	8.5
Pulse RC/Dimokratia	7–10 Nov 2017	1,114	24.5	37.0	9.0	9.0	7.0	1.5	2.0	2.0	–	–	–	–	–	–	12.5
PAMAK/Skai	24–25 Oct 2017	1,135	21.5	37.0	8.5	7.5	6.5	2.0	3.0	3.5	–	–	2.5	–	–	–	15.5
Marc/Proto Thema	20–25 Oct 2017	?	22.3; 64	36.8; 155	8.1; 23	8.6; 25	8.1; 23	2.5; 0	2.5; 0	3.6; 10	1.9; 0	–	1.3; 0	1.3; 0	–	–	14.5
Palmos Analysis/tvxs	9–12 Oct 2017	1,010	22.0	30.0	8.5	8.0	8.5	3.0	2.0	3.0	2.0	2.0	2.0	–	–	–	8.0
Alco/Newsit	25–28 Sep 2017	1,000	23.6	32.9	9.2	7.6	7.5	2.5	2.9	3.2	2.9	–	1.9	–	–	–	9.3
PAMAK/Skai	20–22 Sep 2017	1,025	21.0	35.5	8.5	9.0	7.5	1.0	2.5	2.5	–	–	–	–	–	–	14.5
Metron Analysis/Ta Nea	18–20 Sep 2017	1,201	22.7	36.7	7.3	8.8	7.1	2.8	2.9	3.4	1.7	–	1.9	–	–	–	14.0
Kapa Research/To Vima	7–11 Sep 2017	1,215	22.6	30.9	8.9	9.4	8.2	2.0	3.5	3.0	1.8	1.8	1.8	–	–	–	8.3
Marc/Proto Thema	4–7 Sep 2017	?	22.3; 64	36.8; 156	8.4; 24	8.1; 23	8.1; 24	2.7; 0	2.8; 0	3.2; 9	1.8; 0	–	1.4; 0	1.5; 0	–	–	14.5
Alco/Newsit	4–6 Sep 2017	1,000	22.9	33.2	9.0	7.9	8.6	1.7	3.0	3.0	2.8	–	1.4	–	–	–	10.3
Metron Analysis/Parapolitika	3–5 Jul 2017	1,003	22.2	37.0	8.3	8.1	8.0	2.7	2.7	3.8	1.6	–	2.0	–	–	–	14.8
MRB/Real News	20–29 Jun 2017	2,000	21.7	36.1	9.0	9.0	8.4	2.4	3.0	3.5	–	1.2	2.8	–	–	–	14.4
PAMAK/Skai	21–23 Jun 2017	1,145	18.0	39.5	8.5	7.0	9.0	2.5	2.5	3.0	2.0	2.0	1.0	–	–	–	21.5
Κapa Research/To Vima	21–22 Jun 2017	1,006	22.2	31.8	9.0	8.8	8.4	2.2	3.6	3.2	1.5	1.6	2.2	–	–	–	9.6
PAMAK/Skai	24–26 May 2017	1,187	19.5	38.0	9.0	6.5	9.0	2.0	2.5	3.0	1.0	2.5	2.0	1.0	–	–	18.5
Marc/Proto Thema	24–26 May 2017	1,000	18.4; 55	37.7; 164	8.2; 25	6.8; 20	8.3; 25	2.7; 0	2.8; 0	3.5; 11	1.9; 0	1.6; 0	1.6; 0	1.4; 0	–	–	19.3
Pulse RC/Action24	21–23 May 2017	1,202	21.0	37.0	8.5	8.0	7.5	2.0	2.0	2.0	1.0	1.0	3.0	1.5	–	–	16.0
Metron Analysis/Parapolitika	6 May 2017	?	22.0	36.8	8.4	7.0	8.1	2.4	2.8	4.1	2.0	2.6	1.4	–	–	–	14.8
Kapa Research/To Vima	19–20 Apr 2017	1,200	22.2	31.8	9.2	8.9	8.0	2.4	3.4	3.2	1.8	1.4	2.4	–	–	–	9.6
PAMAK/Skai	6–8 Apr 2017	1,084	18.0	38.5	9.0	7.5	8.0	2.5	2.5	2.5	1.0	–	2.5	–	–	–	20.5
Pulse RC/Action24	2–5 Apr 2017	1,156	21.5	36.5	8.5	8.0	7.0	2.5	2.5	2.5	2.5	1.0	3.0	1.0	–	–	15.0
Palmos Analysis/tvxs	23–30 Mar 2017	1,001	24.5	35.0	6.5	7.0	9.0	2.0	2.0	3.0	1.5	1.5	2.0	–	–	–	10.5
Marc/Proto Thema	18 Mar 2017	?	18.1; 54	37.7; 163	8.4; 25	7.3; 22	8.6; 25	2.9; 0	2.9; 0	3.6; 11	1.4; 0	1.3; 0	2.1; 0	–	–	–	19.6
Pulse RC/Action24	13–15 Mar 2017	2,305	22.0	37.0	8.5	7.5	7.5	2.5	2.5	3.0	1.0	1.0	3.0	–	–	–	15.0
Opinion Poll/Eleftheros Typos	10 Mar 2017	?	17.7	37.9	8.2	6.7	6.8	1.2	2.4	3.1	2.4	2.4	3.2	–	–	–	20.2
PAMAK/Skai	8–10 Mar 2017	1,069	18.0	38.0	9.0	7.5	9.0	2.0	3.0	2.5	1.5	–	2.5	–	–	–	20.0
MRB/Star	13–15 Feb 2017	?	18.4	35.3	9.1	9.0	8.9	2.8	3.0	3.0	–	–	2.8	–	–	–	16.9
PAMAK/Skai	9–10 Feb 2017	1,016	20.0	39.5	9.0	8.0	8.5	2.0	2.0	2.5	1.5	–	2.0	–	–	–	19.5
Rass/iefimerida	31 Jan–3 Feb 2017	1,504	20.3	34.6	9.4	9.8	8.8	2.7	3.4	3.6	–	1.5	2.2	–	–	–	14.3
Metron Analysis/ANT1	26–28 Jan 2017	1,005	22.3	36.9	8.0	7.0	7.2	2.5	3.0	3.2	2.2	1.6	2.2	–	–	–	14.6
Marc/Proto Thema	23–26 Jan 2017	1,008	18.9; 54	38.3; 159	7.9; 22	7.7; 22	8.5; 24	2.7; 0	3.1; 9	3.7; 10	1.6; 0	–	2.7; 0	–	–	–	19.4
Interview/Vergina	20–24 Jan 2017	1,000	23.8	36.7	7.4	6.1	6.1	2.5	3.1	3.1	1.2	–	2.2	1.5	–	–	12.9
Alco/Parapolitika	17–19 Jan 2017	1,000	21.7	32.7	10.3	7.6	8.7	1.7	3.0	3.3	1.8	–	2.9	–	–	–	11.0
PAMAK/Skai	15–17 Jan 2017	1,064	19.5	36.5	9.0	7.5	7.5	2.5	2.5	3.0	1.0	–	3.0	–	–	–	17.0
Kapa Research/To Vima	21–22 Dec 2016	1,002	22.9	31.6	9.0	7.6	7.2	2.5	3.1	3.5	1.7	1.4	3.1	–	–	–	8.7
MRB/Newsit	10–12 Dec 2016	1,013	20.1	35.7	10.3	8.3	8.3	2.1	3.3	3.7	–	1.4	3.3	–	–	–	15.6
MRB/Newsit	2–9 Dec 2016	2,000	20.0	36.0	10.3	8.0	7.9	2.5	3.0	3.7	–	1.5	3.8	–	–	–	16.0
Marc/Proto Thema	3–7 Dec 2016	?	18.6; 44/57	37.7; 144/160	8.3; 18/27	6.5; 13/21	8.3; 18/27	2.2; 0/8	3.3; 8/12	3.5; 8/12	1.6; 0	–	3.3; 8/12	–	–	–	19.1
Pulse RC/Action24	2–3 Dec 2016	1,209	23.5	36.5	8.5	7.0	6.5	2.5	2.5	3.0	1.0	1.0	3.5	–	–	–	13.0
PAMAK/Skai	28–30 Nov 2016	1,082	19.0	38.0	9.5	6.5	7.0	2.0	2.5	3.5	1.0	–	3.5	–	–	–	19.0
PAMAK/Skai	3–4 Nov 2016	1,080	18.5	37.0	8.5	5.5	7.0	2.5	2.5	3.5	1.0	2.0	3.5	–	–	–	18.5
Alco/Parapolitika	31 Oct–3 Nov 2016	1,000	22.3	31.4	9.3	7.1	7.1	2.5	3.2	3.0	3.2	–	4.2	–	–	–	9.1
Public Issue	20–27 Oct 2016	1,004	18.0	42.0	8.0	8.0	7.5	2.5	2.0	2.0	–	–	2.5	–	–	–	24.0
Alco/Newsit	11–14 Oct 2016	1,000	21.9	31.2	10.0	6.7	7.4	2.3	3.2	3.3	3.6	–	3.6	–	–	–	9.3
PAMAK/Skai	30 Sep–1 Oct 2016	1,059	20.0	36.0	9.5	5.5	7.0	2.0	2.5	2.5	2.0	2.5	2.5	–	–	–	16.0
MRB/Real News	24 Sep 2016	?	23.8	34.0	8.9	7.9	6.4	2.9	3.4	3.5	1.8	–	2.9	–	–	–	10.2
Opinion Poll/Eleftheros Typos	24 Sep 2016	?	23.0	39.0	8.0	6.5	7.0	2.0	2.5	2.5	2.0	–	4.0	–	–	–	16.0
Pulse RC/iefimerida	20–21 Sep 2016	1,261	26.0	35.5	8.0	6.5	6.5	2.5	2.5	3.5	2.0	–	2.5	–	–	–	9.5
Marc/Alpha TV	19–21 Sep 2016	1,005	21.4	32.2	9.1	6.8	8.4	2.7	3.6	3.6	1.7	–	2.9	–	–	–	10.8
Palmos Analysis/tvxs	13–15 Sep 2016	1,004	27.0	32.0	7.5	6.5	7.5	2.5	2.0	2.5	1.5	–	3.5	–	–	–	5.0
Alco/Parapolitika	12–15 Sep 2016	1,000	22.9	31.5	9.6	5.5	7.4	2.2	3.1	4.1	3.0	–	3.8	–	–	–	8.6
Kapa Research/To Vima	6–8 Sep 2016	1,002	25.6	31.1	8.8	6.7	7.6	2.5	3.0	3.8	1.4	2.0	2.4	–	–	–	5.5
PAMAK/Skai	1–2 Sep 2016	1,034	21.5	34.0	9.0	7.0	7.0	2.0	2.5	4.5	2.0	–	2.0	–	–	–	12.5
Alco/Parapolitika	3 Jul 2016	?	21.4	30.1	10.3	5.7	7.6	3.6	3.1	4.7	3.7	–	3.6	–	–	–	8.7
PAMAK/Skai	27–29 Jun 2016	1,044	21.0	35.0	10.0	5.5	7.5	2.0	2.5	3.5	2.0	3.0	2.0	–	–	–	14.0
Pulse RC/Action24	24–27 Jun 2016	1,115	26.5	34.5	7.5	6.0	6.0	3.0	3.0	3.5	3.0	1.0	3.0	–	–	–	8.0
MRB/Real.gr	16–24 Jun 2016	2,000	25.6	33.1	8.4	7.4	7.3	2.8	3.3	4.5	1.2	–	3.2	–	–	–	7.5
Kapa Research/To Vima	7–9 Jun 2016	1,003	25.6	30.8	8.7	7.4	7.5	3.0	3.4	4.6	1.8	–	3.2	–	–	–	5.2
Alco/Proto Thema	30 May–2 Jun 2016	1,000	22.3	31.6	10.1	5.3	8.0	2.7	3.1	3.7	3.9	–	3.0	–	–	–	9.3
PAMAK/Skai	24–26 May 2016	1,070	22.0	32.5	9.0	5.5	7.0	2.5	2.5	5.0	1.5	–	3.0	–	–	–	10.5
AUEB–STAT	10–16 May 2016	1,705	22.0	27.5	13.5	5.6	6.6	3.3	3.0	4.3	3.6	2.7	4.4	–	–	–	5.5
Kapa Research/To Vima	12–14 Apr 2016	1,005	27.0	31.4	8.0	8.7	7.2	2.7	3.7	3.8	–	–	–	–	–	–	4.4
Pulse RC/Action24	11–13 Apr 2016	1,208	28.0	35.0	7.5	6.5	6.5	2.5	2.5	3.0	3.0	1.0	–	–	–	–	7.0
PAMAK/Skai	29–30 Mar 2016	1,026	21.5	32.5	8.5	5.5	8.5	3.5	3.5	5.5	2.0	–	–	–	–	–	11.0
Alco/Proto Thema	15–17 Mar 2016	1,000	25.7	31.4	9.1	5.3	7.4	2.7	3.3	3.9	3.3	–	–	–	–	–	5.7
Rass/To Paron	1–4 Mar 2016	1,001	28.6	32.0	7.8	6.5	7.6	2.8	3.4	5.7	2.4	–	–	–	–	–	3.4
Metron Analysis/Parapolitika	26 Feb 2016	?	27.7	33.9	7.3	6.0	6.7	3.1	3.3	5.3	3.0	2.0	–	–	–	–	6.2
PAMAK/Skai	22–24 Feb 2016	1,205	23.0	31.5	8.0	6.0	7.0	2.5	3.5	6.0	2.5	–	–	–	–	–	8.5
MRB/Real.gr	4–11 Feb 2016	2,000	27.4	31.8	7.7	6.7	7.8	3.1	3.5	4.8	2.8	2.2	–	–	–	–	4.4
Kapa Research/To Vima	18–21 Jan 2016	1,003	29.0	30.9	8.6	6.1	7.9	3.1	4.3	3.6	2.5	–	–	–	–	–	1.9
Pulse RC/Action24	18–19 Jan 2016	1,207	29.5	34.5	6.5	5.5	6.5	2.5	2.5	3.0	3.5	1.0	–	–	–	–	5.0
Metron Analysis/Parapolitika	15 Jan 2016	?	29.1	34.5	6.7	6.0	6.7	3.2	3.1	3.9	3.4	–	–	–	–	–	5.4
Alco/Proto Thema	12–15 Jan 2016	1,000	27.9	33.0	8.1	4.8	8.4	2.5	2.9	4.0	2.0	–	–	–	–	–	5.1
MRB/Real News	21–22 Dec 2015	1,003	28.6	27.4	8.4	7.1	8.2	3.9	4.2	4.5	3.9	–	–	–	–	–	1.2
ProRata/iefimerida	15–16 Dec 2015	1,000	29.0	27.5	9.5	6.0	8.5	3.5	3.0	4.5	3.5	–	–	–	–	–	1.5
Kapa Research/To Vima	25–26 Nov 2015	1,006	30.8	24.9	9.3	7.5	7.4	3.7	3.5	3.8	3.2	–	–	–	–	–	5.9
September 2015 parliamentary election	20 Sep 2015	—	35.5; 145	28.1; 75	7.0; 18	6.3; 17	5.6; 15	4.1; 11	3.7; 10	3.4; 9	2.9; 0	0.9; 0	–	–	–	–	7.4
