= Babiniotis Dictionary =

Dictionary of Modern Greek

The Dictionary of Modern Greek (Greek: Λεξικό της Νέας Ελληνικής Γλώσσας, ΛΝΕΓ), more commonly known as Babiniotis Dictionary (Λεξικό Μπαμπινιώτη), is a well-known dictionary of Modern Greek published in Greece by Lexicology Centre and supervised by Greek linguist Georgios Babiniotis.

== Editions ==
The dictionary has gone through several editions:

- 1998, first edition
- 2002, second edition, reprinted (with minor corrections and optimizations) in 2003, 2004, 2006
- July 2008, third edition, 2,032 pages, some notable new words entered in the Greek language include viagra (βιάγκρα), bluetooth (μπλουτούθ), bio-fuel (βιοκαύσιμο), and blogger (μπλόγκερ).
- 2012, fourth edition, 2,256 pages. ISBN 978-960-89751-5-6
- 2019, fifth edition, 2,316 pages. ISBN 978-960-9582-14-8
- 2024, sixth edition

== Quotations ==
- The giant called Greek language cannot be tamed easily! The language constantly evolves, ideas and the world change, and so do our communication needs. (Ο "γίγαντας" που λέγεται Ελληνική γλώσσα δεν δαμάζεται εύκολα! Η γλώσσα εξελίσσεται συνεχώς, τα δεδομένα αλλάζουν, ο κόσμος μας μεταβάλλεται και μαζί αλλάζουν οι επικοινωνιακές μας ανάγκες)

About the book

[this book] is a landmark in Greek linguistics and lexicography. It provides the largest scale picture of the Greek language after the demise of diglossia, offering a plethora of invaluable information about the multiple resources of Greek. Its breadth and scope render it a useful tool for teachers of Greek, for learners, translators, creative writers, and—generally—anyone who uses the language with some frequency. However, it is not only its size that makes Babiniotis’s dictionary an outstanding work. Its distinctive character is that, with the exception of Kriaras’s smaller and less-broadly focused work (1995), it is the only dictionary of the contemporary Greek language compiled by a professional linguist on the basis of expert rather than amateurish standards and principles. This major oeuvre by the doyen of modern Greek linguistics is bound to constitute one of the standard reference works for years to come, alongside Stamatakos’s and Dimitrakos’s earlier accomplishments.

This massive volume of 2,064 pages was met with huge public debate and became a bestseller. It offers 150,000 "words and phrases" and is credited (by Goutsos) with giving the fullest picture of Greek since the demise of diglossia and having the most scientifically arranged lemmata, trying not to give synonyms as definitions, and including comment boxes with both prescriptive and descriptive mini-essays.

== See also ==
- Babiniotis Dictionary court case
- Triantafyllidis Dictionary

== Bibliography ==
- Peter Mackridge, Review of the Dictionary of the Modern Greek Language, G. Babiniotis, Journal of Greek Linguistics 2:1 (2002)
