= Radical Movement of Social Democratic Alliance =

Radical Movement of Social Democratic Alliance RIKSSY Ριζοσπαστική Κίνηση Σοσιαλδημοκρατικής Συμμαχίας ΡΙΚΣΣΥ
- Leader: Andreas Loverdos
- Founded: 3 December 2012
- Dissolved: 15 April 2013
- Split from: PASOK
- Succeeded by: Agreement for the New Greece
- Ideology: Social democracy Social liberalism Pro-Europeanism
- Political position: Centre-left

Radical Movement of Social Democratic Alliance (RIKSSY) (Greek: Ριζοσπαστική Κίνηση Σοσιαλδημοκρατικής Συμμαχίας, ΡΙΚΣΣΥ (a play on words with the homophone ρήξη, "rupture"), was a short-lived (2012-2013) political party in Greece, established in December 2012. It was formed by Andreas Loverdos a former minister of the PASOK.

== Founding Declaration ==
- The promotion of social democratic ideas, as recorded in its founding declaration.
- The reflection and action on national, political, social and cultural issues, with the aim of contributing to convergence, integration and unification of the forces of radical social democracy, reform of modern European Left, democratic-progressive forces of the Greek society, with the ultimate aim of creating a political entity.
- Coordination with other similar movements, organizations, networks and individuals in our field, which will respond to the need of citizens for collective action with the active presence as a necessary and sufficient condition for the achievement of common goals.
