= Georgios Babiniotis =

Greek linguist and philologist (born 1939)

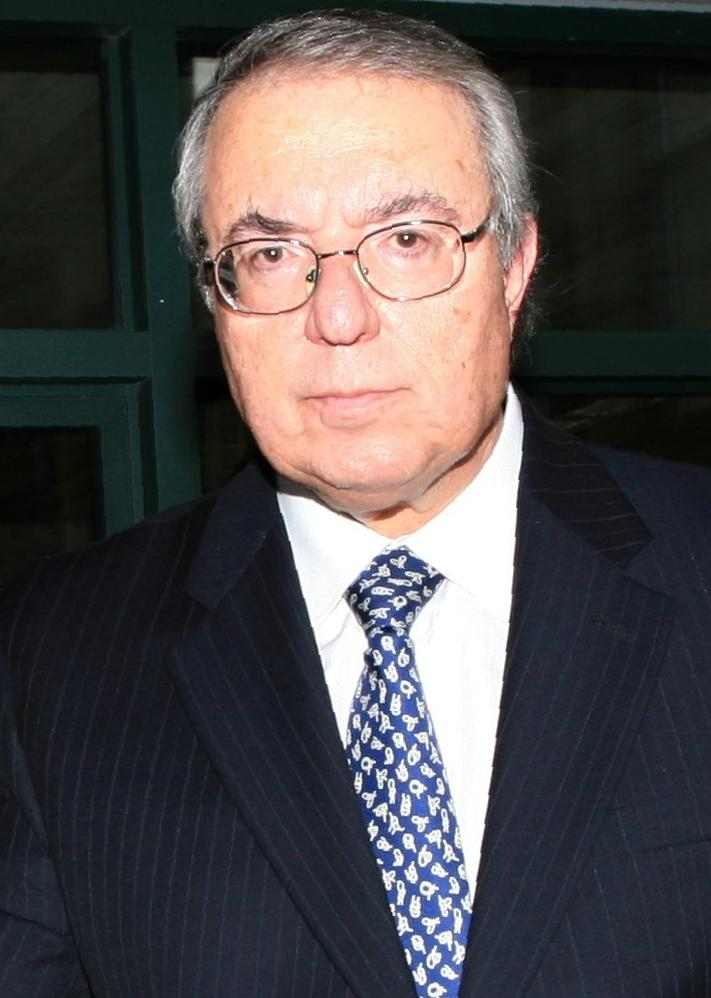
Georgios Babiniotis

Georgios Babiniotis (Greek: Γεώργιος Μπαμπινιώτης [ʝeˌorʝios babiˈɲotis]; born 6 January 1939) is a Greek linguist and philologist and former Minister of Education and Religious Affairs of Greece. He previously served as rector of Athens University. As a linguist, he is best known as the author of a Dictionary of Modern Greek (Λεξικό της νέας ελληνικής γλώσσας), which was published in 1998.

== Biography ==
He was born in Athens in 1939. He graduated from the 9th Boys' Gymnasium of Athens and then he studied philology at the School of Philosophy of the University of Athens. In 1962 he earned his bachelor's degree from the University of Athens and he continued his studies in Greece and Germany. Before his 35th birthday, he became a full professor of linguistics at the Department of Philology of the School of Philosophy of the University of Athens. In 1991 he was elected president of the Philology Section of the Philosophy School and in 2000 he was elected rector of Athens University, a position he held until 2006.

He is also president of the Arsakeio-Tositseio Schools Educationalist Society (Φιλεκπαιδευτική Εταιρεία Αρσακείων-Τοσιτσείων Σχολείων), president of the management council of the Greek Civilization Foundation (Ίδρυμα Ελληνικού Πολιτισμού) and president of the Athens Linguistics Society (Γλωσσική Εταιρεία των Αθηνών). In 2009 he was assigned manager of the Council of Primary and Secondary Education (Συμβούλιο Πρωτοβάθμιας και Δευτεροβάθμιας Εκπαίδευσης) and he works on the changes of the examinations system in Greek secondary schools (Lyceums) that allow students to undertake tertiary education. He frequently writes articles for the daily newspaper To Vima and was also scientific advisor for the Greek public television stations. He manages the Lexicology Centre (Κέντρο Λεξικολογίας) which in 1998 published the Dictionary of Modern Greek (Λεξικό της νέας ελληνικής γλώσσας), which has also come to be known as the "Babiniotis dictionary".

On 7 March 2012, he was appointed Minister of National Education and Religious Affairs in the coalition cabinet of Prime Minister Lucas Papademos, a post which he held until 17 May 2012.

== See also ==
- Babiniotis dictionary court case

Political offices
Preceded by Anna Diamantopoulou	Minister for National Education and Religious Affairs; 7 March – 17 May 2012	Succeeded by Frosso Kiaou
