= Aristides Baltas =

Greek politician

- Αριστείδης Μπαλτάς
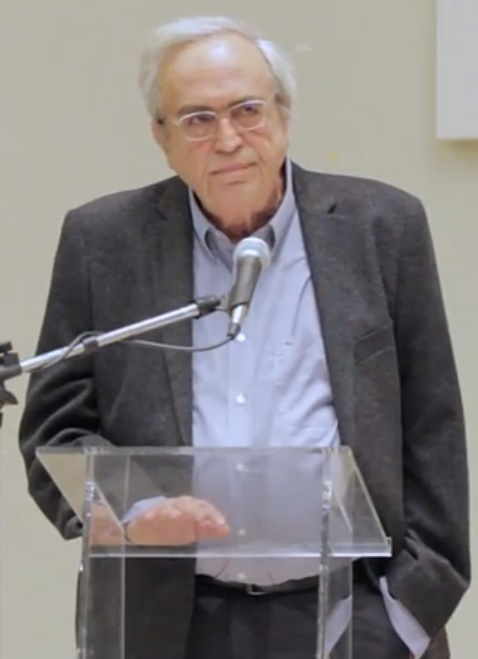

Minister of Culture and Sports
- In office 23 September 2015 – 5 November 2016
- Prime Minister: Alexis Tsipras
- Preceded by: Frosso Kiaou as Minister of Culture, Education and Religious Affairs
- Succeeded by: Lydia Koniordou

Minister of Culture, Education and Religious Affairs
- In office 27 January – 28 August 2015
- Prime Minister: Alexis Tsipras
- Preceded by: Andreas Loverdos as Minister of Education and Religious Affairs; Konstantinos Tasoulas as Minister of Culture and Sport
- Succeeded by: Frosso Kiaou

Personal details
- Born: 9 February 1943 (age 83) Corfu, Greece
- Party: SYRIZA
- Education: NTUA; University of Paris XI
- Profession: Philosopher of science, physicist, politician

Aristides Baltas (Greek: Αριστείδης Μπαλτάς; born 9 February 1943) is a philosopher of science and physicist who served as the Minister of Culture and Sports of Greece and as the Minister of Culture, Education and Religious Affairs in the cabinet of Alexis Tsipras from 27 January 2015 to 4 November 2016.

He is currently the Emeritus Professor of Philosophy of Science at the National Technical University of Athens and President of the Nicos Poulantzas Institute. In the September 2015 Greek legislative election, he was elected MP for the Attica constituency with SYRIZA.

== Education and academic career ==
Baltas trained in electrical and mechanical engineering at the National Technical University of Athens (NTUA) from 1962 to 1967 before going on to complete a doctorate in theoretical physics under François Lurçat at University of Paris XI in 1971. His thesis title was La Neutrino-Production des Résonances Baryoniques dans le Modèle des Quarks ("Neutrino Production of Baryonic Resonances in the Quark Model"). In 1982, he returned to NTUA to become a lecturer at the Department of Physics. From 1984 to 1985 he was a visiting fellow at the Center for Philosophy of Science of the University of Pittsburgh, a capacity he later resumed in 2005–6. He was appointed assistant professor of philosophy and methodology of physics at NTUA in 1984, then associate professor of the philosophy of science in 1992 and professor in 2002.

Baltas's research has dealt particularly with the epistemology of Louis Althusser, and more generally with the relationship between philosophy of science and epistemology and between analytic and continental philosophy. His work encompasses the fields of physics, mathematics, psychoanalysis, and historical materialism. Other philosophers studied by Baltas include Ludwig Wittgenstein, Friedrich Nietzsche, Baruch Spinoza, Jacques Derrida, John McDowell, and Walter Benjamin.

=== Awards ===
In 2002, Baltas was awarded the National Prize for Nonfiction for his book Objects and Aspects of Self (Αντικείμενα και όψεις εαυτού). In December 2010, he received the Xanthopoulos–Pneumatikos Award for Excellence in Academic Teaching.

== Political career ==
A founding member of the Coalition of the Radical Left (SYRIZA), in 2012 Baltas was a coordinating member of its policy planning committee. Following the victory of SYRIZA in the Greek legislative election of January 2015, Baltas was appointed Minister of Culture, Education and Religious Affairs in the Tsipras Cabinet. Soon after entering office, Baltas stated that beyond the immediate objectives of relieving the humanitarian crisis in Greek schools and resolving the problem of "eternal students" who are forced to suspend their studies in order to find work to sustain themselves, his long-term goals as minister would be to restore the independence of secondary education from higher education, to abolish pan-Hellenic examinations, and to support free access to higher education.

== Books in English ==
- Peeling Potatoes or Grinding Lenses: Spinoza and Young Wittgenstein Converse on Immanence and Its Logic. Pittsburgh: University of Pittsburgh Press, 2012 (ISBN 0822944162)

Political offices
Preceded by Frosso Kiaou as Minister of Culture, Education and Religious Affairs	Minister of Culture and Sports; 23 September 2015 – 5 November 2016	Succeeded by Lydia Koniordou
Preceded by Andreas Loverdos as Minister of Education and Religious Affairs	Minister of Culture, Education and Religious Affairs; 27 January – 28 August 2015	Succeeded by Frosso Kiaou
Preceded by Konstantinos Tasoulas as Minister of Culture and Sport	Minister of Culture, Education and Religious Affairs; 27 January – 28 August 2015	Succeeded by Frosso Kiaou
