= Babiniotis Dictionary court case =

1998 court case in Greece

The court case of the Babiniotis Dictionary (Greek: Υπόθεση Λεξικoύ Μπαμπινιώτη) was fought in Greece over the legality of the publication of a Modern Greek dictionary that included a definition of the word "Bulgarian" (referring to a person or persons).

George Babiniotis, professor of linguistics at Athens University, managed the publication of a dictionary in 1998, named Dictionary of Modern Greek, more commonly known as Babiniotis Dictionary. The dictionary was published by the Lexicology Centre.

For the word "Bulgarian" the dictionary provided a dual definition, first its normal use referring to persons descended from Bulgaria, and second a definition marked as vulgar and derogatory to denote a fan of PAOK football team.

On 23 May 1998 a person took legal action asking for the second definition to be deleted. The courts accepted the case with number 18134/1998 and agreed that the obscene definition had no place in a dictionary, so the publisher had to delete the second definition from every unsold copy of the dictionary or otherwise it couldn't be legally sold anymore. The author, faced prison time and a fine should he defy the ruling.

This was criticized by some people, including some law professors, and later the court case was reviewed by a higher court. On 22 April 1999 the higher court, with case number 13/1999, decided to overturn the decision of the lower court.
