= Frosso Kiaou =

Greek politician and lawyer

- Φρόσω Κιάου

Minister of Culture, Education and Religious Affairs Education, Lifelong Learning and Religious Affairs (2012)
- In office 28 August 2015 – 23 September 2015
- Prime Minister: Vassiliki Thanou-Christophilou
- Preceded by: Aristides Baltas
- In office 17 May 2012 – 21 June 2012
- Prime Minister: Panagiotis Pikrammenos
- Preceded by: Georgios Babiniotis
- Succeeded by: Konstantinos Arvanitopoulos

Personal details
- Party: Independent
- Spouse: Nikos Kiaos
- Education: University of Hamburg

Angeliki-Efrosini Kiaou (Greek: Αγγελική - Ευφροσύνη Κιάου), known as Frosso Kiaou (Greek: Φρόσω Κιάου), is a Greek politician who was the Minister of Culture, Education and Religious Affairs in the Caretaker Cabinet of Vassiliki Thanou-Christophilou. She previously served as the Minister for Education, Lifelong Learning and Religious Affairs from May to June 2012 in the Caretaker Cabinet of Panagiotis Pikrammenos.

== Education ==
Kiaou studied law at the University of Hamburg.

== Professional career ==
Kiaou worked as a lawyer, and served at one time as vice president of the Athens Bar Association.

== Political career ==
In 2012, Kiaou wrote to Günter Grass to thank him for a recent poem in which he criticized the European Union's handling of the Greek government-debt crisis.

== Personal life ==
Kiaou is married to Nikos Kiaos, a journalist and former President of the ESIEA, the journalists' union of Athens newspapers.
