= Manolis Triantafyllidis =

Greek linguist and educator (1883–1959)

Manolis A. Triantafyllidis
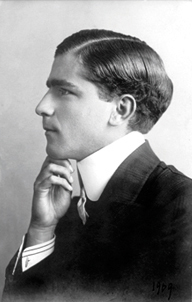
- Born: 15 November 1883; Athens, Greece
- Died: 20 April 1959 (aged 75); Athens, Greece
- Occupations: Educator, linguist
- Known for: Demotic movement in education, Triantafyllidis Dictionary

Manolis A. Triantafyllidis (Greek: Μανόλης Α. Τριανταφυλλίδης; 15 November 1883 – 20 April 1959) was a Greek linguist and educator. He was a major representative of the demotic movement.

He was mostly active in Thessaloniki, at the Aristotle University of Thessaloniki. He is well known for his comprehensive grammar of Modern Greek.

There is an institute named after him at the University of Thessaloniki (the Manolis Triantafyllidis Foundation, also known as the Institute of Modern Greek Studies), under whose auspices the Triantafyllidis Dictionary (formally, Dictionary of Common Modern Greek [Λεξικό της κοινής νεοελληνικής], 1998) was published.
