= Triantafyllidis Dictionary =

Monolingual dictionary of Modern Greek

The Dictionary of Standard Modern Greek (Greek: Λεξικό της κοινής Νεοελληνικής) is a monolingual dictionary of Modern Greek published by the Institute of Modern Greek Studies (Manolis Triantafyllidis Foundation) (named after Manolis Triantafyllidis), at the Aristotle University of Thessaloniki in 1998. It is also called the University of Thessaloniki Dictionary, and is known to the public as Triantafyllidis Dictionary (Λεξικό Τριανταφυλλίδη).

It is searchable online at Portal for the Greek Language. It includes pronunciation in International Phonetic Alphabet (with slight alterations), and in Greek: definitions, examples and etymology. It does not include names and proper nouns. It includes inflectional paradigms for verbs and for nominals.

== History ==
The project was launched in 1968. Its board of directors has included prominent Greek philologists. Responsible for the etymologies was Evangelos Petrounias (Ευάγγελος Πετρούνιας 1935-2016).

Currently, the dictionary is hosted online, and is maintained by Scholarly Supervisor: D. Koutsogiannis, an assistant professor, linguistics, Aristotle University of Thessaloniki.

== See also ==
- Babiniotis Dictionary
