= Dynamic Greece =

- Ideology: Social democracy
- Political position: Centre-left

Website
- https://dynell.gr/

Dynamic Greece (Greek: Δυναμική Ελλάδα) is a citizens movement founded in 2012. However, according to their website, their latest Archive was in August 2015.

Dynamic Greece is part of the Olive Tree electoral alliance formed to contest the 2014 European election. The Olive Tree electoral alliance managed to receive 8.0% of the vote, electing 2 MEPs to the S&D group.
