= Agreement for the New Greece =

Agreement for the New Greece Συμφωνία για τη Νέα Ελλάδα
- Leader: Andreas Loverdos
- Founded: 15 April 2013
- Preceded by: RIKSSY
- Ideology: Social democracy Direct democracy Social liberalism Pro-Europeanism
- Political position: Centre-left
- National affiliation: PASOK, Olive Tree
- Parliament: 0 / 300
- European Parliament: 0 / 22

Website
- www.neel.gr

Agreement for the New Greece (Greek: Συμφωνία για τη Νέα Ελλάδα) is a social-democratic political party in Greece, established on 15 April 2013. It was formed by former Panhellenic Socialist Movement (PASOK) health minister Andreas Loverdos and former members of Radical Movement of Social Democratic Alliance (RIKSSY). It was also supported by Christos Aidonis, an independent MP (former member of PASOK) and Dimitris Tsironis (ex-MP for Arta). The party supports the idea of the Fourth Hellenic Republic.

The Agreement for the New Greece contested the 2014 European election as part of the PASOK-led Olive Tree electoral alliance.

On 22 August 2014, Loverdos returned to PASOK.
