= Andreas Loverdos =

Greek politician (born 1956)

- Ανδρέας Λοβέρδος
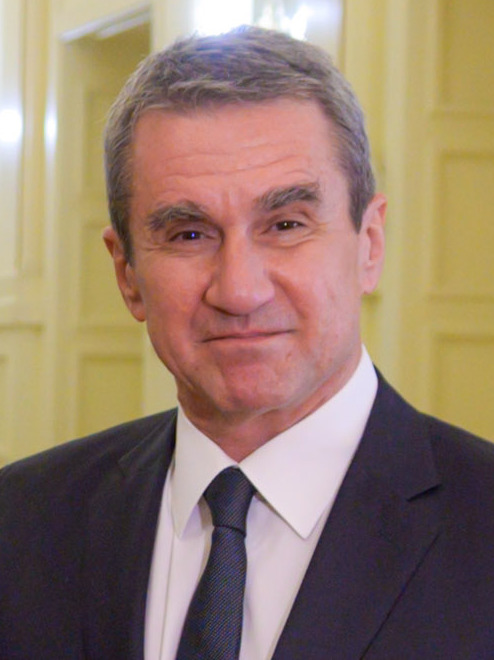
- Loverdos in 2022

Minister of Education and Research
- In office 10 June 2014 – 27 January 2015
- Prime Minister: Antonis Samaras
- Preceded by: Konstantinos Arvanitopoulos
- Succeeded by: Aristides Baltas (Culture, Education and Religious Affairs)

Minister of Health and Social Solidarity
- In office 7 September 2010 – 17 May 2012
- Prime Minister: George Papandreou; Lucas Papademos
- Preceded by: Mariliza Xenogiannakopoulou
- Succeeded by: Christos Kittas

Minister of Labour and Social Security
- In office 7 October 2009 – 7 September 2010
- Prime Minister: George Papandreou
- Preceded by: Fani Palli-Petralia (Employment and Social Protection)
- Succeeded by: Louka Katseli

Personal details
- Born: 15 May 1956 (age 70) Patras, Greece
- Party: New Democracy (2025–now); Democrats (2024–2025); Panhellenic Socialist Movement (Before 2012; 2014–2023); Radical Movement of Social Democratic Alliance (2012–2013); Agreement for the New Greece (2013–2014)
- Other political affiliations: Olive Tree (2014–2015)
- Spouse: Penelope Papaioannou
- Education: University of Thessaloniki; Free University of Brussels, French
- Website: Official website

Andreas Loverdos (Greek: Ανδρέας Λοβέρδος [anˈðreaz loˈverðos]; born 15 May 1956) is a Greek politician who was Minister for Education and Religious Affairs from 2014 to 2015.

== Early life ==
Loverdos was born in Patras. He graduated from the law school of the Aristotle University of Thessaloniki in 1978. From 1978 until 1980, he fulfilled his obligatory military service in the Hellenic Air Force. In 1982, he completed postgraduate studies in European law at the Université libre de Bruxelles. During his studies, he served as vice-president of the Thessaloniki law students' union as well as president of the Greek students' association of Belgium.

In 1986, Andreas Loverdos completed his PhD at the Aristotle University of Thessaloniki with the thesis Terrorism and Political Crime: Study from the Perspective of Law. In 1991, he undertook research at the London School of Economics on the function of government and in 1996 he researched the function of democratic constitutions at Boston University.

== Academic career ==
Andreas Loverdos was Associate Professor of Constitutional Law at Panteion University until 1986, when he was appointed Lecturer for the Department of Postgraduate Studies, a post he held until 1992. From 1992 until 1995, Andreas Loverdos worked as a full Professor of Constitutional Law.

He is an author of numerous articles in legal research journals.

== Political career ==
A leading cadre of the Panhellenic Socialist Movement, Loverdos was first elected to the Hellenic Parliament in the 2000 legislative election. From 23 January 2002 until 10 March 2004 he served as Deputy Minister for Foreign Affairs.

In October 2009, Loverdos was appointed Minister for Labour and Social Security. In September 2010, he was appointed Minister for Health and Social Solidarity. In this capacity, he launched a harsh reform of the pension system during Greece’s first bailout programme. He held this post until 17 May 2012, when the coalition government of Lucas Papademos was replaced by the caretaker government of Panagiotis Pikrammenos.

On 3 December 2012, Loverdos announced the launch of a new political movement, the Radical Movement of Social Democratic Alliance (RIKSSY), and was subsequently expelled from the PASOK parliamentary group. A new political party, the Agreement for the New Greece, was formed by Loverdos and other members of RIKSSY on 15 April 2013. Loverdos returned to the government as Minister for Education and Religious Affairs on 10 June 2014, and to the PASOK parliamentary group on 22 August 2014. In this role, he was given a brief to complete an overhaul of university administration and dismiss thousands of “perpetual students” who failed to meet the 10-year deadline for obtaining a first degree.

In January 2021, Loverdos was removed as the parliamentary leader of Movement for Change. On 5 July 2023 Loverdos left the Movement for Change. In an official statement he said that he left for political reasons and that he wishes the party good luck in its fight.

In 2024 he created the political party “Democrats”.

== Personal life ==
Andreas Loverdos is married to Penelope Papaioannou and has a daughter and two sons.

== Publications ==
- Προσηλυτισμός [Proselytism], Athens 1986, Ant. Sakkoulas Pub.
- Για την τρομοκρατία και το πολιτικό έγκλημα [On terrorism and political crime], Athens 1987, Interbooks Pub.
- Παρεκκλίσεις πολιτικής συμπεριφοράς και Σύνταγμα [Deviations of political behaviour and the Constitution], Athens 1988, Exantas Pub.
- Κυβέρνηση : συλλογική λειτουργία και πολιτική ευθύνη [Government: collective function and political responsibility], Athens 1991, Ant. Sakkoulas Pub.
- Η ποινική ευθύνη των μελών της Κυβέρνησης και των υφυπουργών στο κοινοβουλευτικό πολίτευμα [Penal responsibility of cabinet members and deputy ministers in a parliamentary polity], Athens 1995, Ant. Sakkoulas Pub.
- Μορφές του Δημοκρατικού Πολιτεύματος [Forms of Democracy], Athens 2000, Indiktos Pub.
- Πολιτική Ιστορία της Ελλάδας, 1828–1975 [Political History of Greece, 1828–1975], Athens 2000, Ant. Sakkoulas Pub.
- Η ΝΕΑ ΤΡΟΜΟΚΡΑΤΙΑ με αφορμή την 11η Σεπτεμβρίου [NEW TERRORISM on the occasion of 11 September], Athens 2002, Indiktos Pub.
- Tο Σύνταγμα της Ελλάδας και η αναθεώρησή του [The Constitution of Greece and its revision], Athens 2006, To Pontiki Pub.

Political offices
Preceded by Fani Palli-Petralia as Minister of Employment and Social Protection	Minister of Labour and Social Security; 2009–2010	Succeeded by Louka Katseli
Preceded by Mariliza Xenogiannakopoulou	Minister of Health and Social Solidarity; 2010–2012	Succeeded by Christos Kittas
Preceded by Konstantinos Arvanitopoulos	Minister of Education and Research; 2014–2015	Succeeded by Aristides Baltas as Minister of Culture, Education and Religious Affairs
