= Mariliza Xenogiannakopoulou =

Greek politician

- Μαριλίζα Ξενογιαννακοπούλου
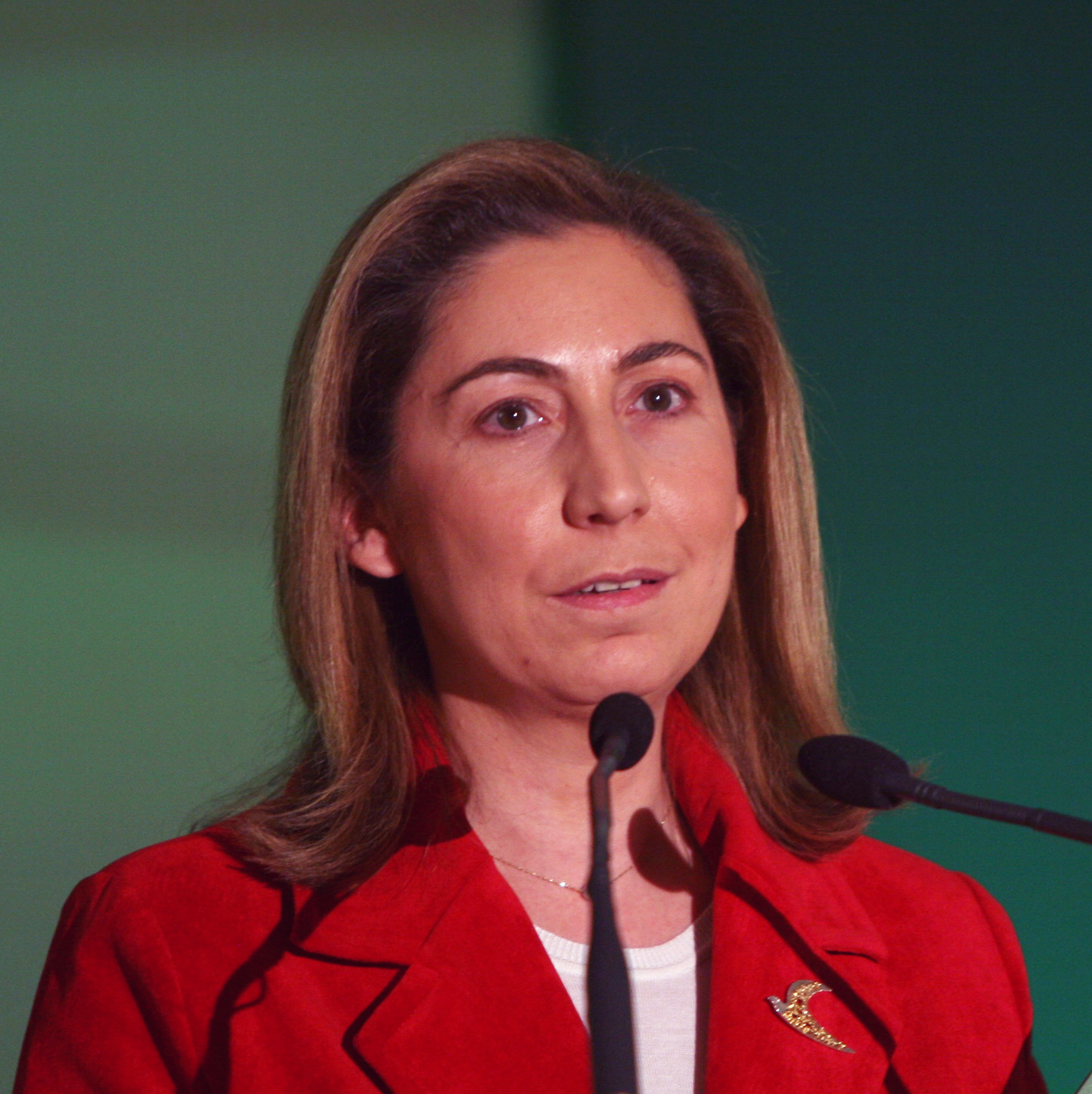
- Xenogiannakopoulou in 2009

Member of the Hellenic Parliament
- In office 7 July 2019 – 29 May 2023
- Constituency: Athens B
- In office 16 September 2007 – 11 April 2012
- Constituency: Athens B

Alternate Minister for Foreign Affairs
- In office 7 September 2010 – 10 February 2012

Minister for Health and Social Solidarity
- In office 7 October 2009 – 7 September 2010
- Preceded by: Dimitris Avramopoulos
- Succeeded by: Andreas Loverdos

Member of the European Parliament
- In office 20 July 2004 – 25 September 2007

Personal details
- Born: 20 February 1963 (age 63) Athens, Greece
- Party: Syriza (2012–present); Panhellenic Socialist Movement (before 2012)
- Education: National and Kapodistrian University of Athens
- Occupation: Lawyer

Mariliza Xenogiannakopoulou (Greek: Μαριλίζα Ξενογιαννακοπούλου, Greek pronunciation: [mariˈliza ksenoʝanakoˈpulu]) (born 1963) is a Greek politician and lawyer. She was Minister for Health and Social Solidarity (2009–2010), Alternate Minister for Foreign Affairs, responsible for European Affairs (2010–2012), Member of the Greek Parliament (2007–2012) and again from July 2019 for Syriza, and of the European Parliament (2004–2007). She served as secretary of the National Committee of PASOK -Panhellenic Socialist Movement, member of the Party of European Socialists (2005–2006).

On 10 February 2012, she resigned from the government, citing objections with the terms of the second EU-IMF bailout for Greece. On 1 November 2012, she resigned her membership of PASOK, expressing her objections on the new austerity measures adopted by the Greek coalition government, stating that the party no longer represented her "ideologically and politically".

== Early life and education ==
Mariliza Xenogiannakopoulou was born in Athens in 1963. Her origin is from Cephallonia and Messinia. She studied at the Law School of the National and Kapodistrian University of Athens (1980–1985) and continued her postgraduate studies at the Sorbonne University (Paris I)- DEA in Public Law (1986).

== Career ==
Mariliza Xenogiannakopoulou is an attorney at law (1987 to date). In 1986, she began working as a scientific associate of the PASOK Parliamentary Group at the European Parliament. From 1991 to 1995, she worked as a member of the Secretariat of the Parliamentary Group of the Party of European Socialists in the European Parliament, after which she was appointed Alternate Director of the office of the Greek Commissioner at the European Commission in Brussels (1995–1999).

From 2002 to the March 2004 elections, she served as Secretary General for Commerce at the Development Ministry in Greece. In this position, she worked for the support of small and medium enterprises (SMEs), the transparency in market prices, the incorporation of commerce into European programmes, the modernisation of the legal framework of street markets, and the strengthening of consumer protection. She was responsible for coordinating the initiatives of the Ministry of Development at the EU Presidency of Greece in 2003.

== Political career ==
Her involvement in public life dates from her schooldays. At university, she was an active member of PASP and PASOK Youth (1980–1985) and a member of the Board of the Law Students' Association (1982–1983). As a member of the International Relations Office of PASOK's Youth Committee, she had the opportunity to represent it at a number of international events (1983–1985). She was also representative of PASOK to the Presidency of the Party of European Socialists (1989–1991) and the Socialist International (1990–1992).

During her long career in the party, Mariliza Xenogiannakopoulou has been member of the PASOK Central Committee (1994–2005) and the National Council (2005–2012), member of the International Relations Committee (1985–1999), and alternate Secretary of the Local Administration Section (1999–2005).

In the 2004 European Elections, she was elected MEP (2004–2007), and was appointed leader of the PASOK Parliamentary Delegation in the European Parliament. She sat on the Parliamentary Committees for Budget, Budgetary Control, Energy, Industry and Research as well as on the Special Committee on the EU's New Financial Perspectives. At the European Parliament, she was the Rapporteur on the Implementation of the EU Budget for the financial year 2003, and the funding of the 7th EU Research and Technological Development Framework Programme.

On 16 March 2005, Mariliza Xenogiannakopoulou was elected as the first woman Secretary of the National Council (2005–2006) and from this position worked for the political and organisational reconstruction of PASOK and the 2006 local elections. As member of the Political Council of PASOK (2006–2009) she was responsible for organising the Policy Conference of PASOK (2007), and was appointed rapporteur for the new Statutes of PASOK at the party's Congress (2008), and the Electoral Programme of PASOK (2009).

Mariliza Xenogiannakopoulou was elected MP for the Athens' Second District in the 2007 and 2009 general elections. She served as Minister for Health and Social Solidarity (2009–2010) and as Alternate Minister of Foreign Affairs (2010–2012).

As Minister of Health she was responsible for the National Health System and the public health policy implemented. She participated at the Council of Health Ministers and worked closely with the European Commission and World Health Organisation for facing the H1N1 flu epidemic. She worked for the modernisation of the National Health System, the upgrading of the regional hospitals and the health services in the islands. She promoted procedures of transparency and restructuring of the National Health System, notably by the establishment of an electronic Observatory for medical procurement, electronic procurement procedures, and new provisions for medicine procurement. She introduced the law for the prohibition of smoking.

As Deputy Foreign Minister she was responsible for the European Affairs. She participated at the General Affairs Council and the Council of External Affairs. She had the responsibility of preparing the European Council meetings on behalf of the Greek government and followed the Institutional Issues of the E.U., the Enlargement Policy, E.U. relations with the Countries of South-Eastern Europe, and the negotiation for the new Financial Perspectives of the E.U. and the Community Budget for the period 2014–2020.

She supervised the Ministry's Legal Service in relation with the incorporation of E.U. law in the Greek legal system as well as the representation of Greece at the European Court of Justice.

Mariliza Xenogiannakopoulou resigned from the government on 10 February 2012, citing objections with the terms of the second EU-IMF bailout, notably concerning the provisions on collective bargaining and social rights, voted against it in the Parliament (12 -2-2012) and was expelled from the parliamentary group of PASOK. She took part at the May and June 2012 general elections as candidate of PASOK, while she supported publicly the prospect of a progressive coalition government that would renegotiate the bailout agreement after the elections.

On 1 November 2012, she resigned her membership of PASOK, expressing her objections on the new austerity measures and stating that the party no longer represented her "ideologically and politically".

In 2014, Mariliza Xenogiannakopoulou "called" for membership of SYRIZA in a post on social media (Facebook), describing Alexis Tsipras' position on the formation of a broad progressive political alliance as "positive".

On 29 August 2018, as part of a reshuffle of Alexis Tsipras' government, she was appointed Minister of Administrative Restructuring, a position she held until the end of the government's term.

In the elections of 7 July 2019, she was elected as a SYRIZA MP for the B1' North sector of Athens, coming in third place,[5] and was appointed by SYRIZA President Alexis Tsipras as SYRIZA's parliamentary representative.

Political offices
Preceded by Dimitris Avramopoulos	Minister for Health and Social Solidarity; 7 October 2009 – 7 September 2010	Succeeded by Andreas Loverdos
