= Olive Tree (Greece) =

Defunct political and electoral alliance in Greece

Olive Tree Ελιά
- Founded: 8 March 2014
- Dissolved: 7 July 2014
- Succeeded by: Democratic Alignment
- Ideology: Social democracy Pro-Europeanism
- Political position: Centre-left
- European affiliation: Party of European Socialists
- European Parliament group: Progressive Alliance of Socialists and Democrats
- Colours: Red, Green
- Slogan: With the power of the democratic alignment

Website
- elia-dimokratikiparataxi.gr

The Olive Tree (Greek: Ελιά, Elia), full name Olive Tree – Democratic Alignment (Ελιά – Δημοκρατική Παράταξη) was a centre-left electoral alliance. The alliance included the Panhellenic Socialist Movement (PASOK) and minor allies, the Agreement for the New Greece, Dynamic Greece and the New Reformers. The Olive Tree was endorsed by Martin Schulz, the Party of European Socialists' candidate for European Commission presidency.

In the May 2014 European elections, the Olive Tree list came in fourth place nationally, receiving 8.0% of the vote, electing 2 MEPs to the S&D group.

It remained legally active (albeit not as a political formation) alongside PASOK – KINAL, PASOK and Democratic Alignment until 2022, as balance sheets were published for 2019, 2020, 2021 and 2022

== See also ==
- Democratic Coalition (Greece, 2015)
