= Democratic Alignment (2015) =

Democratic Alignment Δημοκρατική Συμπαράταξη
- Leader: Fofi Gennimata
- Founded: 30 August 2015
- Dissolved: 16 March 2018
- Preceded by: Olive Tree – Democratic Alignment
- Merged into: Movement for Change
- Ideology: Majority: Social democracy Pro-Europeanism; Factions: Democratic socialism Social liberalism
- Political position: Centre-left

The Democratic Alignment (Greek: Δημοκρατική Συμπαράταξη (ΔΗΣΥ), romanized: Dimokratiki Symparataxi, DISI), also translated as Democratic Coalition, was a political alliance in Greece.

== History ==
The alliance was launched on 30 August 2015 by the Panhellenic Socialist Movement (PASOK) and the Democratic Left (DIMAR).

In the September 2015 legislative election, the alliance received 6.3% of the vote, providing the mandate for 17 seats in the Hellenic Parliament.

In January 2017, the Movement of Democratic Socialists joined Democratic Alignment.

Οn 13 January 2017, MPs Leonidas Grigorakos and Ilchan Achmet joined the Democratic Alignment.

On 16–18 March 2018, DISI and other Greek centre-left parties merged into Movement for Change.

It remained legally active (albeit not as a political formation) alongside PASOK – KINAL, PASOK and Olive Tree until 2022; balance sheets were published for 2019, 2020, 2021 and 2022.

== Election results ==
=== Hellenic Parliament ===
Election	Hellenic Parliament					Rank	Government	Leader
Election	Votes	%	±pp	Seats won	+/−	Rank	Government	Leader
September 2015	341,390	6.4%	+1.1	17 / 300	▲4	#4	Opposition	Fofi Gennimata

^{A} 09/2015 results compared to the combined totals for PASOK and DIMAR in the January 2015 election.

== Name ==
The name Democratic Alignment has been previously used by a 1950/51 centre-left coalition. It had previously been proposed in 2014 by Evangelos Venizelos as a new name for PASOK, but was rejected by former prime minister George Papandreou.

== See also ==
- Olive Tree (Greece)
