= List of streets in Athens =

This article is a list of every street in municipality (corresponding within Center of Athens) of Athens, Greece.

- Red background Includes parts that are not within the municipality of Athens

== 0-9 ==
Name	Namesake	Length	Start	End	Neighbourhood(s)	Numbering (even)	Numbering (odd)
3is Septemvriou; 3ης Σεπτεμβρίου	3 September 1843 Revolution	1,780 m (5,840 ft)	Omonoia Square, Omonoia	Agiou Meletiou Str., Amerikis Square	Omonoia, Vathi, Victoria, Amerikis Square	2-178	1-173

== Α ==
Name	Namesake	Length	Start	End	Neighbourhood(s)	Numbering (even)	Numbering (odd)
Avanton; Αβάντων	Abantes	105 m (344 ft)	Nileos Str., Thiseio	Erysichthonos Str., Thiseio	Thiseio	2-14	1-33
Avarikioti, Giannakou; Αβαρικιώτη, Γιαννάκου	Ioannis Avarikiotis	50 m (160 ft)	Vafeiochoriou Str., Polygono	Zinopoulou Str., Polygono	Polygono	2-4	1-7
Avdiron; Αβδήρων	Abdera	235 m (771 ft)	Kalama Str., Sepolia	Navarchou Lykoudi Str., Sepolia	Sepolia	2-44	1-43
Averof; Αβέρωφ	George Averoff	325 m (1,066 ft)	Acharnon Str., Vathi	Patission Str., Polytechneio	Vathi, Polytechneio	2-30	1-31
Avias; Αβίας	Avia	105 m (344 ft)	Thyssou Str., Lambrini	Siganeou Str., Lambrini	Lambrini	2-12	
Avlichou; Άβλιχου	Mikelis Avlichos	85 m (279 ft)	Ymittou St., Gouva	Chersifronos Str., Gouva	Gouva	2-14	1-11
Avramiotou; Αβραμιώτου	Ioannis-Dionysios Avramiotis	85 m (279 ft)	Agias Eirinis Str., Plaka	Voreou Str., Plaka	Plaka	2-10	1-11
Avradinou; Αβραντινού	Unknown	70 m (230 ft)	Agapinou Str., Polygono	Amfeias Str., Polygono	Polygono	2-8	1-7
Avydou; Αβύδου	Abydos	95 m (312 ft)	Tralleon Str., Lambrini	Kleonon Str., Lambrini	Lambrini	2-6	1-7
Agatharchou; Αγαθάρχου	Agatharchus	70 m (230 ft)	Lepeniotou Str., Psyri	Agion Anargyron Str., Psyri	Psyri	2-12	1-15
Agathimerou; Αγαθημέρου	Agathemerus	155 m (509 ft)	Tzaferi Str., Rouf	Alkminis Str., Rouf	Rouf	2-12	1-7
Agathiou; Αγαθίου	Agathias	250 m (820 ft)	Emmanouil Chrysolora Str., Exarcheia	Charilaou Trikoupi Str., Exarcheia	Exarcheia	2-32	1-25
Agathodaimonos; Αγαθοδαίμονος	Agathodaemon	455 m (1,493 ft)	Peiraios Str., Petralona	Ious Str., Petralona	Petralona	2-44	1-45
Agathokleous; Αγαθοκλέους	Agathocles	125 m (410 ft)	Ymittou Str., Gouva	Alkyonias Str., Gouva	Gouva	2-12	1-15
Agathoupoleos; Αγαθουπόλεως	Agathopolis	930 m (3,050 ft)	Fokionos Negri Str., Kypseli	Ionias Ave., Attiki	Amerikis Square, Attiki	2-108	1-107
Agathonos; Αγάθωνος	Agathon	55 m (180 ft)	Karori Str., Agora	Vyssis Str., Agora	Agora		
Agamemnonos; Αγαμέμνονος	Agamemnon	95 m (312 ft)	Thessalonikis Str., Petralona	Aeropis Str., Petralona	Petralona	2-12	1-15
Aganippis; Αγανίππης	Aganippe	30 m (98 ft)	Lykaiou Str., Polygono	Amfikleias Str., Polygono	Polygono	2-6	1
Agapinoros; Αγαπήνορος	Agapenor	55 m (180 ft)	Agiou Stylianou Str., Polygono	Megaloupoleos Str., Polygono	Polygono	2-8	1-7
Agapinou; Αγαπηνού	Tellos Agras	105 m (344 ft)					
Agaristis; Αγαρίστης	Agariste	100 m (330 ft)	Ymittou Str., Gouva	Meteoron Str., Gouva	Gouva	2-12	1-13
Angelidou, Foti; Αγγελίδου, Φώτη	Fotis Angelidis	95 m (312 ft)					
Angelikara; Αγγελικαρά	Nikolaos Angelikaras	75 m (246 ft)					
Angelopoulon; Αγγελόπουλων	Angelopoulos family	60 m (200 ft)					
Angistis; Αγγίστης	Angista	170 m (560 ft)					
Agelaou; Αγελάου	Agelaus	145 m (476 ft)	Sosou Str., Gouva	Filolaou Str., Gouva	Gouva	2-18	1-19
Aginoros; Αγήνορος	Agenor	145 m (476 ft)	Dimofontos Str., Thiseio	Galateias Str., Thiseio	Thiseio	2-12	1-11
Agisandrou; Αγησάνδρου	Agesander	105 m (344 ft)	Filolaou Str., Gouva	Iliados Str., Gouva	Gouva	2-18	1-13
Agisilaou; Αγησιλάου	Agesilaus	845 m (2,772 ft)	Iera Odos, Kerameikos	Voulgari Str., Omonoia	Kerameikos, Omonoia	2-108	1-79
Agias Annis; Αγίας Άννης	Saint Anne	2,570 m (8,430 ft) (Note: 1,200m. in Athens)					
Agias Eirinis; Αγίας Ειρήνης	Saint Irene	120 m (390 ft)					
Agias Eleousis; Αγίας Eλεούσης	Eleusa icon	90 m (300 ft)	Miaouli Str., Psyri	Protogenous Str., Psyri	Psyri	2-14	1-9
Agias Zonis; Αγίας Ζώνης	Cincture of the Theotokos	960 m (3,150 ft)	Keas Str., Kypseli	Fokionos Negri Str., Kypseli	Kypseli	2-124	1-111
Agias Theklas; Αγίας Θέκλας	Thecla	120 m (390 ft)	Ermou Str., Psyri	Karaiskaki Str., Psyri	Psyri	2-18	1-13
Agias Lavras; Αγίας Λαύρας	Agia Lavra	1,120 m (3,670 ft)	Patission Str., Ano Patisia	Chatzidaki Str., Ano Patisia	Ano Patisia	2-92	1-109
Agias Marinas; Αγίας Μαρίνας	Saint Marina	90 m (300 ft)					
Agias Markellas; Αγίας Μαρκέλλας	Saint Markella	180 m (590 ft)					
Agias Paraskevis; Αγίας Παρασκευής	Paraskevi of Rome	900 m (3,000 ft)					
Agias Sofias; Αγίας Σοφίας	Hagia Sophia	1,310 m (4,300 ft)					
Agias Philotheis; Αγίας Φιλοθέης	Philothei of Athens	140 m (460 ft)					
Agias Foteinis; Αγίας Φωτεινής	Samaritan woman at the well	190 m (620 ft)					
Agidos; Άγιδος	Agis	90 m (300 ft)	Amvrosiou Plyta Sq. Gouva	Damagitou Str., Gouva	Gouva	2-18	1-13
Agiou Aimilianou; Αγίου Αιμιλιανού	Saint Aimilianos	55 m (180 ft)					
Agiou Andreou; Αγίου Ανδρέου	Andrew the Apostle	55 m (180 ft)					
Agiou Antoniou; Αγίου Αντωνίου	Anthony the Great	300 m (980 ft)					
Agiou Artemiou; Αγίου Αρτεμίου	Artemius	215 m (705 ft)					
Agiou Dimitriou; Αγίου Δημητρίου	Demetrius of Thessaloniki	160 m (520 ft)					
Agiou Dimitriou Oplon; Αγίου Δημητρίου Όπλων	Demetrius of Thessaloniki	845 m (2,772 ft)	Tertipi Str., Kato Patisia	Miliaraki Str., Kato Patisia	Kato Patisia	2-100	1-105
Agiou Thoma; Αγίου Θωμά	Thomas the Apostle	365 m (1,198 ft)					
Agiou Isidorou; Αγίου Ισιδώρου	Isidore of Chios	215 m (705 ft)					
Agiou Konstantinou; Αγίου Κωνσταντίνου	Constantine the Great	500 m (1,600 ft)	Omonoia Sq., Omonoia	Karaiskaki Sq., Metaxourgeio	Omonoia, Metaxourgeio	2-60	1-61
Agiou Louka; Αγίου Λουκά	Luke the Evangelist	555 m (1,821 ft)					
Agiou Markou; Αγίου Μάρκου	Mark the Evangelist	220 m (720 ft)					
Agiou Meletiou; Αγίου Μελετίου	Meletius of Antioch	1,750 m (5,740 ft)	Kypselis Str., Kypseli	Dyrrachiou Str., Sepolia	Kypseli, Amerikis Square, Agios Panteleimonas, Attiki, Sepolia	2-204	1-193
Agiou Orous; Αγίου Όρους	Mount Athos	420 m (1,380 ft)					
Agiou Pavlou; Αγίου Παύλου	Paul the Apostle	340 m (1,120 ft)					
Agiou Petrou; Αγίου Πέτρου	Saint Peter	55 m (180 ft)					
Agiou Polykarpou; Αγίου Πολυκάρπου	Polycarp	1,460 m (4,790 ft)					
Agiou Savva; Αγίου Σάββα	Sabbas the Sanctified	340 m (1,120 ft)					
Agiou Spyridonos; Αγίου Σπυρίδωνος	Saint Spyridon	115 m (377 ft)					
Agiou Stefanou; Αγίου Στεφάνου	Saint Stephen	145 m (476 ft)					
Agiou Stylianou; Αγίου Στυλιανού	Stylianos of Paphlagonia	320 m (1,050 ft)					
Agiou Fanouriou; Αγίου Φανουρίου	Phanourios the Newly-Revealed	110 m (360 ft)					
Agiou Philippou; Αγίου Φιλίππου	Philip the Apostle	110 m (360 ft)					
Agiou Charalambous; Αγίου Χαραλάμπους	Charalambos	335 m (1,099 ft)					
Agion Anargyron; Αγίων Αναργύρων	Cosmas and Damian	185 m (607 ft)					
Agion Apostolon; Αγίων Αποστόλων	Apostles	75 m (246 ft)					
Agion Asomaton; Αγίων Ασωμάτων	Holy Archangels Church	285 m (935 ft)					
Agion Panton; Αγίων Πάντων	All Saints	110 m (360 ft)					
Agylis; Αγκύλης	Ancyle	690 m (2,260 ft)	Lassani Str., Kynosargous	Ilioupoleos Str., Kynosargous	Kynosargous	2-80	1-81
Agyras; Αγκύρας	Ankara	80 m (260 ft)					
Agonitou, Kyriakou; Αγκωνίτου, Κυριάκου	Cyriacus of Ancona	140 m (460 ft)					
Aglaonikis; Αγλαονίκης	Aglaonice	265 m (869 ft)					
Aglaofontos; Αγλαοφώντος	Aglaophon	80 m (260 ft)					
Aglavridon; Αγλαυρίδων	Aglaurus, Herse and Pandrosus	95 m (312 ft)					
Aglavrou; Αγλαύρου	Aglaurus	175 m (574 ft)					
Agnanton; Αγνάντων	Agnanta	185 m (607 ft)					
Agonaridou; Αγοναρίδου	Unknown	95 m (312 ft)					
Agorakritou; Αγορακρίτου	Agoracritus	445 m (1,460 ft)					
Agraion; Αγραίων	Agraeis	360 m (1,180 ft)					
Agras; Άγρας	Agrae	380 m (1,250 ft)					
Agrafon; Αγράφων	Agrafa	215 m (705 ft)					
Agriniou; Αγρινίου	Agrinio	220 m (720 ft)					
Anchialou; Αγχιάλου	Pomorie	450 m (1,480 ft)					
Anchisou; Αγχίσου	Anchises	50 m (160 ft)					
Adanon; Αδάνων	Adana	55 m (180 ft)					
Admitou; Αδμήτου	Admetus	630 m (2,070 ft)					
Adrastou; Αδράστου	Adrastus	80 m (260 ft)					
Adrianeiou; Αδριανείου	Hadrian's Aqueduct	545 m (1,788 ft)					
Adrianou; Αδριανού	Hadrian	1,180 m (3,870 ft)	Agion Asomaton Str., Thiseio	Lysikratous Str., Plaka	Thiseio, Plaka	2-154	1-131
Adrianoupoleos; Αδριανουπόλεως	Edirne	285 m (935 ft)					
Adonidos; Αδώνιδος	Adonis	225 m (738 ft)					
Aeropis; Αερόπης	Aerope	130 m (430 ft)					
Aeroporon; Αεροπόρων	Air Force officers	50 m (160 ft)					
Aetiou; Αετίου	Aetius	140 m (460 ft)					
Aetionos; Αετίωνος	Aetion	160 m (520 ft)					
Aetorrachis; Αετορράχης	Aetorrachi	550 m (1,800 ft)					
Aeton; Αετών	Unknown	255 m (837 ft)					
Aidonon; Αηδόνων	Unknown	115 m (377 ft)					
Athamanias; Αθαμανίας	Athamania	275 m (902 ft)					
Athamantos; Αθάμαντος	Athamas	145 m (476 ft)					
Athanasakis; Αθανασάκη	Ioannis Athanasakis	155 m (509 ft)					
Athanasiadou; Αθανασιάδου	Prodromos Bodosakis-Athanasiadis	85 m (279 ft)					
Athanasias; Αθανασίας	Unknown	225 m (738 ft)					
Athanaton; Αθανάτων	Unknown	290 m (950 ft)					
Athinagorou; Αθηναγόρου	Athenagoras of Athens	130 m (430 ft)					
Athinaidos; Αθηναΐδος	Aeilia Eudocia	160 m (520 ft)					
Athinaiou; Αθηναίου	Unknown	165 m (541 ft)					
Athinas; Αθηνάς	Athena	800 m (2,600 ft)	Omonoia Sq., Omonoia	Ermou Str., Plaka	Omonoia, Agora, Psyri, Plaka	2-64	1-69
Athinodorou; Αθηνοδώρου	Athenodorus Cananites	480 m (1,570 ft)					
Athinon; Αθηνών	Athens	10,840 m (35,560 ft) (Note: 2,230m. in Athens)	Konstantinoupoleos Ave., Kolonos	Schistou Ave., Skaramagas	Kolonos, Egaleo, Chaidari, Skaramagas	2-380 (Note: Including parts in Egaleo)	1-429 (Note: Including parts in Egaleo)
Aiakou; Αιακού	Aeacus	135 m (443 ft)					
Aiantos; Αίαντος	Ajax the Great	70 m (230 ft)					
Aigaiou; Αιγαίου	Aegean Sea	40 m (130 ft)					
Aigaleo; Αιγάλεω	Mount Aigaleo	310 m (1,020 ft)					
Aigeiras; Αιγείρας	Aigeira	60 m (200 ft)					
Aigeos; Αιγέως	Aegeus	280 m (920 ft)					
Aigiidon; Αιγηίδων	Aigeis	460 m (1,510 ft)					
Aigialeias; Αιγιαλείας	Aigialeia	65 m (213 ft)					
Aiginis; Αιγίνης	Aegina	510 m (1,670 ft)					
Aiginitou, Dimitriou; Αιγινήτου, Δημητρίου	Demetrios Eginitis	205 m (673 ft)					
Aigiou; Αιγίου	Aigio	330 m (1,080 ft)					
Aigisthou; Αιγίσθου	Aegisthus	160 m (520 ft)					
Aiglis; Αίγλης	Aegli	450 m (1,480 ft)					
Aigosthenon; Αιγοσθένων	Aigosthena	1,000 m (3,300 ft) (Note: 290m. in Athens)					
Aigyptou; Αιγύπτου	Egypt	230 m (750 ft)					
Aidesiou; Αιδεσίου	Aedesius	220 m (720 ft)					
Aithalidou; Αιθαλίδου	Aethalides	180 m (590 ft)					
Aithalidon; Αιθαλίδων	Aethalidae	85 m (279 ft)					
Aitherias; Αιθερίας	Aetheria	50 m (160 ft)					
Aitheros; Αιθέρος	Aether	150 m (490 ft)					
Aithras; Αίθρας	Aethra	100 m (330 ft)					
Ailianou; Αιλιανού	Claudius Aelianus	415 m (1,362 ft)					
Aimonos; Αίμονος	Haemon	1,110 m (3,640 ft)					
Aimou; Αίμου	Balkan Mountains	400 m (1,300 ft)					
Aineiou; Αινείου	Aeneas	165 m (541 ft)					
Ainianos; Αινιάνος	Ainis	100 m (330 ft)					
Ainou; Αίνου	Aenus	340 m (1,120 ft)					
Aixoneon; Αιξωνέων	Aexone	175 m (574 ft)					
Aioleon; Αιολέων	Aeolians	435 m (1,427 ft)					
Aiolidos; Αιολίδος	Aeolis	565 m (1,854 ft)					
Aiolou; Αιόλου	Aeolus	1,070 m (3,510 ft)	Panepistimiou Str., Omonoia	Pelopida Str., Plaka	Omonoia, Agora, Plaka	2-106	1-105
Akadimias; Ακαδημίας	Academy of Athens	1,270 m (4,170 ft)	Kanigos Str., Exarcheia	Vasilissis Sofias Ave., Kipos	Exarcheia, Akadimia, Kolonaki, Kipos	2-100	1-97
Alexandras; Αλεξάνδρας	Alexandra of Greece and Denmark	2,690 m (8,830 ft)	Patission Str., Pedion tou Areos	Kifissias Ave., Ampelokipoi	Pedion tou Areos, Exarcheia, Gyzi, Lycabettos, Kountouriotika, Ampelokipoi	2-200	1-227
Amfiaraou; Αμφιαράου	Amphiaraus	1,590 m (5,220 ft)	Apsou Str., Sepolia	Monastiriou Str., Kolonos	Sepolia, Kolonos	2-198	1-213
Anagnosti, Argyri; Αναγνώστη, Αργύρη	Argyris Anagnostis	40 m (130 ft)	Mysonos Str., Kynosargous	Irakleous Str., Kynosargous	Kynosargous		
Andokidou; Ανδοκίδου	Andocides	35 m (115 ft)	Lysiou Str., Plaka	Thrasyvoulou Str., Plaka	Plaka		1-5
Apollodorou; Απολλοδώρου	Apollodorus of Athens	90 m (300 ft)	Deinostratou Str., Kynosargous	Dead end near Theodoritou Vresthenis Str., Kynosargous	Kynosargous	2-6	1-9
Apostolou Pavlou; Αποστόλου Παύλου	Paul the Apostle	790 m (2,590 ft)	Dionysiou Areopagitou Str., Acropolis	Eptachalkou Str., Thiseio	Acropolis, Thiseio		1-61
Aretousas; Αρετούσας	Aretousa	125 m (410 ft)	Dioskouron Str., Plaka	Klepsydras Str., Plaka	Plaka	2-12	1-13
Areos; Άρεως	Ares	170 m (560 ft)	Monastiraki Sq., Plaka	Poikilis Str., Plaka	Plaka	2-20	1-9
Aristotelous; Αριστοτέλους	Aristotle	1,600 m (5,200 ft)	Chalkokondyli Str., Vathi	Agiou Meletiou Str., Amerikis Square	Vathi, Victoria, Amerikis Square	2-182	1-189
Arkesilaou; Αρκεσιλάου	Arcesilaus	135 m (443 ft)	Evdoxou Str., Kynosargous	Pytheou Str., Kynosargous	Kynosargous	2-18	1-19
Asklipiou; Ασκληπιού	Asclepius	1,490 m (4,890 ft)	Akadimias Str., Akadimia	Alexandras Ave., Exarcheia	Akadimia, Exarcheia, Neapoli	2-160	1-191
Acharnon; Αχαρνών	Acharnes	5,020 m (16,470 ft) (Note: 4,370m in Athens)	Marni Str., Vathi	Kifisou Ave., Nea Chalkidona	Vathi, Victoria, Agios Panteleimonas, Kato Patisia, Agios Eleftherios, Ano Patisia, Nea Chalkidona	2-472	1-481
Apsou; Αψού	Osum	330 m (1,080 ft)	Kifisou Ave., Sepolia	Dramas Str., Sepolia	Sepolia	2-22	1-23

== Β ==
Name	Namesake	Length	Start	End	Neighbourhood(s)	Numbering (even)	Numbering (odd)
Vasileos Alexandrou; Βασιλέως Αλεξάνδρου	Alexander of Greece	816 m (2,677 ft) (Note: 519m. in Athens)	Vasilissis Sofias Ave., Ilisia	Ymittou Str., Kaisariani	Ilisia, Pangrati, Kaisariani	2-10 (Note: Including parts in Kaisariani)	1-17 (Note: Including parts in Kaisariani)
Vasileos Konstantinou; Βασιλέως Κωνσταντίνου	Constantine I of Greece	1,330 m (4,360 ft)	Vasilissis Olgas Ave., Zappeio	Vasilissis Sofias Ave., Ilisia	Zappeio, Stadio, Pangrati, Ilisia	2-50	1-37
Vasilissis Amalias; Βασιλίσσης Αμαλίας	Amalia of Oldenburg	846 m (2,776 ft)	Vasilissis Sofias Ave., Syntagma	Dionysiou Areopagitou Str., Makrygianni	Syntagma, Plaka, Zappeio, Makrygianni	2-54	
Vasilissis Olgas; Βασιλίσσης Όλγας	Olga Constantinovna of Russia	506 m (1,660 ft)	Vasilissis Amalias Ave., Zappeio	Vasileos Konstantinou Ave., Zappeio	Zappeio		
Vasilissis Sofias; Βασιλίσσης Σοφίας	Sophia of Prussia	2,740 m (8,990 ft)	Vasilissis Amalias Ave., Syntagma	Alexandras Ave., Ampelokipoi	Syntagma, Kipos, Kolonaki, Ilisia, Kountouriotika, Ampelokipoi	2-126	1-137
Veranzerou; Βερανζέρου	Pierre-Jean de Béranger	569 m (1,867 ft)	Akadimias Str., Omonoia	Marni Str., Omonoia	Omonoia	2-50	1-59
Vlachou, Aggelou; Βλάχου, Αγγέλου	Aggelos Vlachos	91 m (299 ft)	Pandrosou Str., Plaka	Adrianou Str., Plaka	Plaka	2-10	1-11
Voukourestiou; Βουκουρεστίου	Treaty of Bucharest	711 m (2,333 ft)	Stadiou Str., Syntagma	Dead end between Stratiotikou Syndesmou Str. and Ilia Rogakou Str., Kolonaki	Syntagma, Kolonaki	2-58	1-55
Vouliagmenis; Βουλιαγμένης	Vouliagmeni	15,320 m (50,260 ft) (Note: 1,310m. in Athens)	Kallirrois Str., Kynosargous	Poseidonos Ave., Voula	Kynosargous, Dafni, Agios Dimitrios, Ilioupoli, Alimos, Argyroupoli, Elliniko, Glyfada, Voula	2-604 (Note: Including parts in Dafni, Agios Dimitrios and Ilioupoli)	1-591 (Note: Including parts in Dafni, Agios Dimitrios and Ilioupoli)

== Γ ==
Name	Namesake	Length	Start	End	Neighbourhood(s)	Numbering (even)	Numbering (odd)
Galatsiou; Γαλατσίου	Galatsi	1,630 m (5,350 ft) (Note: 874m. in Athens)	Patission Str., Ano Patissia	Veikou Ave., Galatsi	Ano Patisia, Galatsi	2-112 (Note: Including parts in Galatsi)	1-141 (Note: Including parts in Galatsi)

== Δ ==
Name	Namesake	Length	Start	End	Neighbourhood(s)	Numbering (even)	Numbering (odd)
David d'Angers; Δαυίδ ντ'Ανζέ	David d'Angers	25 m (82 ft)	Vasilissis Amalias Ave., Makrygianni	Tzireon Str., Makrygianni	Makrygianni		
Deinostratou; Δεινοστράτου	Dinostratus	777 m (2,549 ft)	Aglaonikis Str., Kynosargous	Karpou Str., Kynosargous	Kynosargous	2-110	1-115
Deligiorgi; Δεληγιώργη	Epameinondas Deligeorgis	369 m (1,211 ft)	Pireos Str., Omonoia	Karaiskaki Sq., Metaxourgeio	Omonoia	2-36	1-59
Derigny; Δεριγνύ	Henri de Rigny	521 m (1,709 ft)	Acharnon Str., Agios Panteleimonas	Mavrommataion Str., Victoria Square	Agios Panteleimonas, Victoria	2-74	1-63
Dexippou; Δεξίππου	Dexippus	91 m (299 ft)	Areos Str., Plaka	Panos Str., Plaka	Plaka		1-9
Afoi Diogenidi; Διογενίδη	Brothers of the Diogenis Family of the Byzantine Empire	95 m (312 ft)	Alexandras Avenue	Vasileou Voulgaroktonou	Exarcheia	2 - 6	1 - 5
Dionysiou Areopagitou; Διονυσίου Αρεοπαγίτου	Dionysios the Areopagite	840 m (2,760 ft)	Vasilissis Amalias Ave., Makrygianni	Apostolou Pavlou Str., Acropolis	Makrygianni, Acropolis	2-20	1-49
Dokou; Δοκού	Dokos	43 m (141 ft)	Naxou Str., Kypseli	Psyttaleias Str., Kypseli	Kypseli	2	1-3
Dousmani; Δούσμανη	Viktor Dousmanis	65 m (213 ft)	Nikopoleos Str., Kato Patisia	Serifou Str., Kato Patisia	Kato Patisia	2-10	1-7
Drosopoulou, Ioannou; Δροσοπούλου, Ιωάννου	Ioannis Drosopoulos	2,270 m (7,450 ft)	Kodrigtonos Str., Kypseli	Galatsiou Ave., Ano Patisia	Kypseli, Ano Patisia	2-256	1-239

== Ε ==
Name	Namesake	Length	Start	End	Neighbourhood(s)	Numbering (even)	Numbering (odd)
Ekataiou; Εκαταίου	Hecataeus of Miletus	674 m (2,211 ft)	Theodoritou Vresthenis Str., Kynosargous	Kasomouli Str., Kynosargous	Kynosargous	2-80	1-95
Emmanouil, Adelfon; Εμμανουήλ, Αδελφών	Ioannis and Panagiotis Emmanouil	225 m (738 ft)					
Eptanisou; Επτανήσου	Heptanese	920 m (3,020 ft)	Dead end between Kyprou and Kallifrona Sts., Kypseli	Kypselis Str., Kypseli	Kypseli	2-72	1-85
Ermou; Ερμού	Hermes	1,660 m (5,450 ft)	Syntagma Sq., Syntagma	Dimofontos Str., Gazi	Syntagma, Plaka, Psyri, Gazi	2-136	1-137
Erotokritou; Ερωτοκρίτου	Erotokritos	127 m (417 ft)	Lysiou Str., Plaka	Tripodon Str., Plaka	Plaka	2-16	1-11
Evdoxou; Ευδόξου	Eudoxus of Cnidus	730 m (2,400 ft)	Theodoritou Vresthenis Str., Kynosargous	Kasomouli Str., Kynosargous	Kynosargous	2-86	1-79
Efpalinou; Ευπαλίνου	Eupalinos	217 m (712 ft)	Lefkosias St., Kato Patisia	Patission Str., Kato Patisia	Kato Patissia	2-20	1-27
Evripidou; Ευριπίδου	Euripides	641 m (2,103 ft)	Sachtouri Str., Psyri	Aristeidou Str., Agora	Psyri, Plaka, Agora	2-94	1-91
Eftychiou Vonasera; Ευτυχίου Βονασέρα	Eftychios Vonaseras	61 m (200 ft)	Zefxidos Str., Kynosargous	Theonos Str., Kynosargous	Kynosargous	2-10	1-11

== Η ==
Name	Namesake	Length	Start	End	Neighbourhood(s)	Numbering (even)	Numbering (odd)
Ilia Iliou; Ηλία Ηλιού	Ilias Iliou	1,190 m (3,900 ft)	Ilioupoleos Str., Gouva	Lagoumitzi Str., Neos Kosmos	Neos Kosmos, Gouva	2-84	1-97
Irakleiou; Ηρακλείου	Irakleio	6,510 m (21,360 ft) (Note: 1,730m. in Athens)	Zambeliou Str., Ano Patisia	Amarousiou Ave., Palaio Iraklio	Ano Patisia, Rizoupoli, Nea Ionia, Irakleio, Palaio Iraklio	2-528 (Note: Including parts outside Athens)	1-531 (Note: Including parts outside Athens)
Irakleous; Ηρακλέους	Heracles	367 m (1,204 ft)	Kallirrois Str., Kynosargous	Theodorou Geometrou Str., Kynosargous	Kynosargous	2-36	1-41
Iras; Ήρας	Hera	91 m (299 ft)	Sismani Str., Kynosargous	Aglaonikis Str., Kynosargous	Kynosargous	2-10	1-9
Irodou Attikou; Ηρώδου Αττικού	Herodes Atticus	634 m (2,080 ft)	Vasilissis Sofias Ave., Kipos	Vasileos Konstantinou Ave., Stadio	Kipos, Stadio		1-25

== Θ ==
Name	Namesake	Length	Start	End	Neighbourhood(s)	Numbering (even)	Numbering (odd)
Themistokleous; Θεμιστοκλέους	Themistocles	764 m (2,507 ft)	Panepistimiou Str., Omonoia	Kallidromiou Str., Exarcheia	Omonoia, Exarcheia	2-110	1-99
Theodoritou Vresthenis; Θεοδώρητου Βρεσθένης	Theodoritos Vresthenis	717 m (2,352 ft)	Aglaonikis Str., Kynosargous	Mitrou Sarkoudinou Str., Neos Kosmos	Kynosargous, Neos Kosmos	2-102	1-83
Theodorou Diligianni; Θεοδώρου Δηλιγιάννη	Theodoros Deligiannis	755 m (2,477 ft)	Karaiskaki Sq., Metaxourgeio	Filadelfeias Str., Stathmos Larissis	Metaxourgeio, Stathmos Larissis	2-50	1-25
Thespidos; Θέσπιδος	Thespis	135 m (443 ft)	Epimenidou Str., Plaka	Adrianou Str., Plaka	Plaka	2-18	1-17
Thiras; Θήρας	Thira	1,030 m (3,380 ft)	Ionias Ave., Kato Patisia	Eptanisou Str., Kypseli	Kato Patissia, Kypseli	2-122	1-123
Thrasyvoulou; Θρασυβούλου	Thrasybulus	201 m (659 ft)	Panos Str., Plaka	Dead end near Erotokritou Str., Plaka	Plaka	2-18	1-19

== Ι ==
Name	Namesake	Length	Start	End	Neighbourhood(s)	Numbering (even)	Numbering (odd)
Iera Odos; Ιερά Οδός	Sacred Way	8,160 m (26,770 ft) (Note: 2,170m. in Athens)	Peiraios Str., Kerameikos	Athinon Ave., Haidari	Kerameikos, Gazi, Votanikos, Egaleo, Haidari	2-412 (Note: Including parts in Egaleo)	1-351 (Note: Including parts in Egaleo)
Ionias; Ιωνίας	Ionia	3,310 m (10,860 ft)	Sozopoleos Str., Attiki	Sekoundou Str., Probona	Attiki, Kato Patisia, Agios Eleftherios, Ano Patisia, Probona	2-310	1-317
Ioulianou; Ιουλιανού	Julian	994 m (3,261 ft)	Zaimi Str., Pedion tou Areos	Liosion Str., Stathmos Larissis	Pedion tou Areos, Victoria, Stathmos Larissis	2-96	1-89
Ipparchou; Ιππάρχου	Hipparchus	552 m (1,811 ft)	Sostratou Str., Kynosargous	Menekratous Str., Kynosargous	Kynosargous	2-70	1-69
Ippokratous; Ιπποκράτους	Hippocrates	1,630 m (5,350 ft)	Panepistimiou Str., Akadimia	Alexandras Ave., Exarcheia	Akadimia, Exarcheia, Neapoli	2-206	1-215
Ipponikou; Ιππονίκου	Hipponicus	88 m (289 ft)	Lassani Str., Kynosargous	Sostratou Str., Kynosargous	Kynosargous	2-12	1-9

== Κ ==
Name	Namesake	Length	Start	End	Neighbourhood(s)	Numbering (even)	Numbering (odd)
Kalinovou; Καλινόβου	Battle of Kalinovo	117 m (384 ft)	Evelpidon Str., Kypseli	Kerkyras Str., Kypseli	Kypseli	2-10	1-13
Kallinikou; Καλλινίκου	Callinicus	109 m (358 ft)	Patission Str., Kato Patisia	Patmou Str., Kato Patisia	Kato Patissia	2-12	1-9
Kalymnou; Καλύμνου	Kalymnos	500 m (1,600 ft)	Kodrigtonos Str., Victoria	Agiou Meletiou Str., Amerikis Square	Victoria, Amerikis Square	2-58	1-63
Kapnikareas; Καπνικαρέας	Church of Panagia Kapnikarea	175 m (574 ft)	Ermou Str., Plaka	Adrianou Str., Plaka	Plaka	2-16	1-37
Kapodistriou; Καποδιστρίου	Ioannis Kapodistrias	505 m (1,657 ft)	Botassi Str., Exarcheia	Marni Str., Vathi	Exarcheia, Omonoia, Vathi	2-54	1-47
Karamanlaki; Καραμανλάκη	Alexandros Karamanlakis	164 m (538 ft)	Sakellaridi St., Kato Patisia	Patission Str., Kato Patisia	Kato Patissia	2-18	1-13
Kasomouli; Κασομούλη	Nikolaos Kasomoulis	1,300 m (4,300 ft)	Kallirrois Str., Neos Kosmos	Vouliagmenis Ave., Gouva	Neos Kosmos, Gouva	2-108	1-101
Katechaki; Κατεχάκη	Georgios Katechakis	782 m (2,566 ft)	Kifisias Ave., Girokomeio	Mesogeion Ave., Ellinoroson	Erythros Stavros, Ellinoroson	2-76	1-75
Kifisou; Κηφισού	Cephissus	9,600 m (31,500 ft) (Note: 3,350m. in Athens)	Liosion Str., Treis Gefyres	Poseidonos Ave., Moschato-Piraeus border	Treis Gefyres, Sepolia, Kolokynthou, Votanikos, Peristeri, Egaleo, Rentis, Moschato, Piraeus		
Klepsydras; Κλεψύδρας	Klepsydra	99 m (325 ft)	Lysiou Str., Plaka	Theorias Str., Plaka	Plaka	2-10	1-9
Knosou; Κνωσού	Knossos	283 m (928 ft)	Agias Paraskevis St., Kato Patisia	Patission Str., Kato Patisia	Kato Patissia	2-12	1-11
Kodrigtonos; Κοδριγκτώνος	Edward Codrington	579 m (1,900 ft)	Kypselis Str., Kypseli	Acharnon Str., Agios Panteleimonas	Agios Panteleimonas, Victoria	2-62	1-69
Ko; Κω	Kos	117 m (384 ft)	Androu Str., Kypseli	Troias Str., Kypseli	Kypseli	2-40	1-35
Konstantinoupoleos; Κωνσταντινουπόλεως	Constantinople	18,760 m (61,550 ft) (Note: 4,980m. in Athens)	Paschalias Str., Acharnes	Kifisou Ave., Agios Ioannis Rentis	Acharnes, Agioi Anargyroi, Treis Gefyres, Thymarakia, Sepolia, Kolonos, Kerameikos, Votanikos, Gazi, Rouf, Tavros, Rentis	2-372	1-453

== Λ ==
Name	Namesake	Length	Start	End	Neighbourhood(s)	Numbering (even)	Numbering (odd)
Lassani; Λασσάνη	Georgios Lassanis	159 m (522 ft)	Lassani Str., Kynosargous	Ilioupoleos Str., Kynosargous	Kynosargous	2-14	1-27
Lenorman; Λένορμαν	François Lenormant	2,250 m (7,380 ft)	Achilleos Str., Metaxourgeio	Kifisos Ave., Kolokynthou	Metaxourgeio, Kolonos	2-272	1-255
Lefkados; Λευκάδος	Lefkada	286 m (938 ft)	Evelpidon Str., Kypseli	Kypselis Str., Kypseli	Kypseli	2-34	1-35
Lefkosias; Λευκωσίας	Nicosia	547 m (1,795 ft)	Spartis Str., Amerikis Square	William King Str., Kato Patisia	Amerikis Square, Kato Patisia	2-60	1-61
Liosion; Λιοσίων	Liosia area (Ilion, Petroupoli, Kamatero and Ano Liosia)	3,240 m (10,630 ft)	Marni Str., Vathi	Kifisou Ave., Treis Gefyres	Vathi, Stathmos Larissis, Attiki, Thymarakia, Treis Gefyres	2-302	1-319
Louizis Riankour; Λουίζης Ριανκούρ	Louise Riencourt	985 m (3,232 ft)	Agiou Dimitriou Sq., Ampelokipoi	Efstathiou Lampsa Str., Girokomeio	Ampelokipoi, Girokomeio	2-82	1-89
Lysiou; Λυσίου	Lysias	284 m (932 ft)	Panos Str., Plaka	Tripodon Str., Plaka	Plaka	2-26	1-17

== Μ ==
Name	Namesake	Length	Start	End	Neighbourhood(s)	Numbering (even)	Numbering (odd)
Maizonos; Μαιζώνος	Nicolas Joseph Maison	579 m (1,900 ft)	Marni Str., Vathi	Theodorou Deligianni Str., Metaxourgeio	Vathi, Metaxourgeio	2-84	1-71
Mak Millan; Μακ Μίλλαν	Harold Macmillan	90 m (300 ft)	Patission Str., Ano Patisia	Vallianon Str., Ano Patisia	Ano Patisia	2-14	1-13
Markou Avriliou; Μάρκου Αυρηλίου	Marcus Aurelius	89 m (292 ft)	Pelopida Str., Plaka	Thrasyvoulou Str., Plaka	Plaka	2-4	1-7
Markou Botsari; Μάρκου Μπότσαρη	Markos Botsaris	206 m (676 ft)	Despos Sechou Str., Kynosargous	Theodoritou Vresthenis Str., Kynosargous	Kynosargous	2-70	1-79
Marni; Μάρνη	Battle of the Marne	713 m (2,339 ft)	Karolou Str., Vathi	Patission Str., Polytechneio	Vathi, Polytechneio	2-56	1-59
Mavromichali; Μαυρομιχάλη	Mavromichalis family	1,370 m (4,490 ft)	Akadimias Str., Akadimia	Alexandras Ave., Exarcheia	Akadimia, Exarcheia	2-190	1-169
Machis Analatou; Μάχης Αναλάτου	Battle of Phaleron	670 m (2,200 ft)	Lagoumitzi Str., Neos Kosmos	Kratitos Str., Neos Kosmos	Neos Kosmos	2-90	1-111
Menaichmou; Μεναίχμου	Menaechmus	184 m (604 ft)	Aglaonikis Str., Kynosargous	Kallirrois Str., Kynosargous	Kynosargous	2-10	1-9
Menandrou; Μενάνδρου	Menander	733 m (2,405 ft)	Marni Str., Vathi	Evripidou Str., Omonoia	Omonoia	2-70	1-85
Mitrou Sarkoudinou; Μήτρου Σαρκουδίνου	Mitros Sarkoudinos	1,100 m (3,600 ft)	Theodoritou Vresthenis Str., Neos Kosmos	Kratitos Str., Neos Kosmos	Neos Kosmos	2-140	1-147
Michail Voda; Μιχαήλ Βόδα	Michael Soutzos	1,910 m (6,270 ft)	Liosion Str., Vathi	Ionias Ave., Kato Patisia	Vathi, Agios Panteleimonas, Kato Patisia	2-232	1-241
Michail Nomikou; Μιχαήλ Νομικού	Michail Nomikos	306 m (1,004 ft)	Patission Str., Kato Patisia	Agias Paraskevis Str., Kato Patisia	Kato Patisia	2-30	1-39
Michalakopoulou; Μιχαλακοπούλου	Andreas Michalakopoulos	2,490 m (8,170 ft)	Vasileos Konstantinou Ave., Pangrati	Mesogeion Ave., Erythros Stavros	Ilisia, Goudi	2-212	1-205
Mnisikleous; Μνησικλέους	Mnesikles	321 m (1,053 ft)	Mitropoleos Str., Plaka	Prytaneiou Str., Plaka	Plaka	2-28	1-33
Mysonos; Μύσωνος	Myson of Chenae	403 m (1,322 ft)	Theodoritou Vresthenis Str., Kynosargous	Spintharou Str., Kynosargous	Kynosargous	2-56	1-75

== Ν ==
Name	Namesake	Length	Start	End	Neighbourhood(s)	Numbering (even)	Numbering (odd)
Neigy; Νεϊγύ	Treaty of Neuilly-sur-Seine	595 m (1,952 ft)	Patission Str., Ano Patisia	Zafeiropoulou Str., Agios Eleftherios	Ano Patisia, Agios Eleftherios	2-62	1-37
Nikolaou Gyzi; Νικολάου Γύζη	Nikolaos Gyzis	416 m (1,365 ft)	Alexandras Ave., Gyzi	Gyzi Sq., Gyzi	Gyzi	2-46	1-59
Nikopoleos; Νικοπόλεως	Nicopolis	598 m (1,962 ft)	Ionias Ave., Kato Patisia	Patission Str., Kato Patisia	Kato Patissia	2-78	1-69

== Ο ==
Name	Namesake	Length	Start	End	Neighbourhood(s)	Numbering (even)	Numbering (odd)
Othonos; Όθωνος	Otto of Greece	123 m (404 ft)	Filelinnon Str., Syntagma	Vasilissis Amalias Ave., Syntagma	Syntagma	2-10	
Ouilliam King; Ουίλλιαμ Κινγκ	William Lyon Mackenzie King	295 m (968 ft)	Agias Paraskevis Str., Kato Patisia	Patission Str., Kato Patisia	Kato Patissia	2-38	1-35

== Π ==
Name	Namesake	Length	Start	End	Neighbourhood(s)	Numbering (even)	Numbering (odd)
Panepistimiou/Eleftheriou Venizelou; Πανεπιστημίου/Ελευθερίου Βενιζέλου	University of Athens, Eleftherios Venizelos	1,120 m (3,670 ft)	Omonoia Sq., Omonoia	Vasilissis Sofias Ave., Syntagma	Omonoia, Akadimia, Syntagma	2-68	1-73
Panormou; Πανόρμου	Panormus	1,190 m (3,900 ft)	Alexandras Ave., Ampelokipoi	Kifisias Ave., Giorkomeio	Ampelokipoi, Girokomeio	2-86	1-119
Paxon; Παξών	Paxoi	359 m (1,178 ft)	Evelpidon Str., Kypseli	Kypselis Str., Kypseli	Kypseli	2-40	1-35
Papanastasiou, Aeroporou; Παπαναστασίου, Αεροπόρου	Dimitrios Papanastasiou	305 m (1,001 ft)					
Patission/28is Oktovriou; Πατησίων/28ης Οκτωβρίου	Patisia, Ohi Day	4,470 m (14,670 ft)	Panepistimiou str., Omonoia	Ionias Ave., Ano Patisia	Omonoia, Polytechneio, Pedion tou Areos, Victoria, Kypseli, Amerikis Square, Kato Patisia, Ano Patisia	2-386	1-353
Patmou; Πάτμου	Patmos	862 m (2,828 ft)	Knossou Str., Kato Patisia	Kabouroglou Str., Kato Patisia	Kato Patisia	2-106	1-81
Pelopida; Πελοπίδα	Pelopidas	92 m (302 ft)	Panos Str., Plaka	Markou Avriliou Str., Plaka	Plaka		
Promitheos; Προμηθέως	Prometheus	576 m (1,890 ft)	Ionias Ave., Kato Patisia	Patission Str., Kato Patisia	Kato Patissia	2-74	1-83
Prytaneiou; Πρυτανείου	Prytaneion	222 m (728 ft)	Ragava Str., Plaka	Tholou Str., Plaka	Plaka	2-20	1-19
Pytheou; Πυθέου	Pytheas	1,030 m (3,380 ft)	Aglaonikis Str., Kynosargous	Filomilas Str., Kynosargous	Kynosargous	2-130	1-97

== Ρ ==
Name	Namesake	Length	Start	End	Neighbourhood(s)	Numbering (even)	Numbering (odd)
Ragava; Ραγκαβά	Church of Saint Nicholas Ragavas	192 m (630 ft)	Epimenidou Str., Plaka	Tripodon Str., Plaka	Plaka	2-10	1-15
Rodou; Ρόδου	Rhodes	1,530 m (5,020 ft)	Fylis Str., Kato Patisia	Nikolaou Chatziapostolou Str., Sepolia	Kato Patisia, Thymarakia, Sepolia	2-226	1-233

== Σ ==
Name	Namesake	Length	Start	End	Neighbourhood(s)	Numbering (even)	Numbering (odd)
Satovriandou; Σατωβριάνδου	François-René de Chateaubriand	477 m (1,565 ft)	Patission Str., Omonoia	Marni Str., Omonoia	Omonoia	2-54	1-47
Sevastoupoleos; Σεβαστουπόλεως	Sevastopol	1,270 m (4,170 ft)	Feidippidou Str., Ampelokipoi	Pappada Str., Erythros Stavros	Ampelokipoi, Erythros Stavros	2-158	1-137
Serifou; Σερίφου	Serifos	593 m (1,946 ft)	Ionias Ave., Kato Patisia	Patission Str., Kato Patisia	Kato Patissia	2-54	1-63
Sechou, Despos; Σέχου, Δέσπως	Despo Botsi	398 m (1,306 ft)	Kallirrois Str., Kynosargous	Menaichmou Str., Kynosargous	Kynosargous	2-46	1-43
Sifnou; Σίφνου	Sifnos	577 m (1,893 ft)	Ionias Ave., Kato Patisia	Patission Str., Kato Patisia	Kato Patissia	2-60	1-59
Skiathou; Σκιάθου	Skiathos	1,290 m (4,230 ft)	Acharnon Str., Kato Patisia	Dead end on Elikonos Hill, Ano Patisia	Kato Patisia, Ano Patisia	2-138	1-165
Skoufa; Σκουφά	Nikolaos Skoufas	705 m (2,313 ft)	Asklipiou Str., Kolonaki	Kolonaki Sq., Kolonaki	Kolonaki	2-68	1-81
Solonos; Σόλωνος	Solon	1,180 m (3,870 ft)	Kanari Str., Kolonaki	Kapodistriou Str., Exarcheia	Kolonaki, Exarcheia	2-142	1-139
Souri; Σουρή	Georgios Souris	95 m (312 ft)	Filellinon Str., Plaka	Vasilissis Amalias Ave., Plaka	Plaka		1-5
Spintharou; Σπινθάρου	Spintharus of Corinth	490 m (1,610 ft)	Artemonos Str., Kynosargous	Amvrosiou Frantzi Str., Kynosargous	Kynosargous	2-62	1-65
Stadiou; Σταδίου	Panathenaic Stadium	962 m (3,156 ft)	Omonoia Sq., Omonoia	Syntagma Sq., Syntagma	Omonoia, Akadimia, Syntagma	2-60	1-65
Stournari; Στουρνάρη	Nikolaos Stournaras	779 m (2,556 ft)	Oikonomou Str., Exarcheia	Acharnon Str., Vathi	Exarcheia, Polytechneio, Vathi	2-46	1-77
Stratigou Kallari; Στρατηγού Καλλάρη	Konstantinos Kallaris	784 m (2,572 ft)	Acharnon Str., Kato Patisia	Liossion Str., Treis Gefyres	Kato Patisia, Treis Gefyres	2-56	1-71
Streit; Στρέιτ	Stefanos Streit	49 m (161 ft)	Kratinou Str., Agora	Sofokleous Str., Agora	Agora		
Stromnitsis; Στρωμνίτσης	Strumica	69 m (226 ft)	Kalinovou Str., Kypseli	Kypselis Str., Kypseli	Kypseli	2-12	1-7
Syggrou, Andrea; Συγγρού, Ανδρέα	Andreas Syggros	4,930 m (16,170 ft) (Note: 2,210m. in Athens)	Dionysiou Areopagitou Str., Makrygianni	Poseidonos Ave., Palaio Faliro	Makrygianni, Koukaki, Neos Kosmos, Kallithea, Nea Smyrni, Palaio Faliro	2-362 (Note: Including municipalities other than Athens)	1-387 (Note: Including municipalities other than Athens)
Sostratou; Σωστράτου	Sostratus of Cnidus	311 m (1,020 ft)	Theodoritou Vresthenis Str., Kynosargous	Mysonos Str., Kynosargous	Kynosargous	2-36	1-29

== Τ ==
Name	Namesake	Length	Start	End	Neighbourhood(s)	Numbering (even)	Numbering (odd)
Taxiarchon; Ταξιαρχών	Gabriel and Michael	47 m (154 ft)	Dexippou Str., Plaka	Epameinonda Str., Plaka	Plaka	2-4	1-7
Taygetou; Ταϋγέτου	Taygetus	801 m (2,628 ft)	Kythiron Str., Kypseli	Chatzidaki Str., Ano Patisia	Kypseli, Ano Patisia	2-62	1-107
Tzortz; Τζωρτζ	Richard Church	232 m (761 ft)	Stournari Str., Exarcheia	Akadimias Str., Exarcheia	Exarcheia	2-34	1-35
Timanthous; Τιμάνθους	Timanthes	119 m (390 ft)	Evdoxou Str., Kynosargous	Dead end between Deinostratou Str. and Pytheou Str., Kynosargous	Kynosargous	2-16	1-19
Timoxenous; Τιμοξένους	Timoxenos	206 m (676 ft)	Agylis Str., Kynosargous	Spintharou Str., Kynosargous	Kynosargous	2-34	1-25
Tymfristou; Τυμφρηστού	Tymfristos	206 m (676 ft)	Kallirrois Str., Kynosargous	Theodoritou Vresthenis Str., Kynosargous	Kynosargous	2-18	1-17

== Υ ==
Name	Namesake	Length	Start	End	Neighbourhood(s)	Numbering (even)	Numbering (odd)
Yakinthou; Υακίνθου	Hyacinth	127 m (417 ft)	Kyprou Str., Kypseli	Kallifrona Str., Kypseli	Kypseli	2-14	1-15
Yvriou; Υβρίου	Unknown	80 m (260 ft)	Vouliagmenis Ave., Kynosargous	Menekratous Str., Kynosargous	Kynosargous	2-12	1-5
Ygeias; Υγείας	Hygieia	151 m (495 ft)	Alkiviadou Str., Agios Panteleimonas	Alkamenous Str., Agios Panteleimonas	Agios Panteleimonas	2-16	1-17
Ydras; Ύδρας	Hydra	307 m (1,007 ft)	Agiou Georgiou Sq., Kypseli	Evelpidon Str., Kypseli	Kypseli	2-40	1-33
Ylleon; Υλλέων	Hylleis	72 m (236 ft)	Keiriadon Str., Petralona	Thessalonikis Str., Petralona	Petralona	2-10	1-11
Yllou; Ύλλου	Hyllus	62 m (203 ft)	Alexandreias Str., Kolonos	Vasilikon Str., Kolonos	Kolonos	2-8	1-5
Ypsomatheion; Υψωμαθειών	Ypsomatheia	53 m (174 ft)	Konstantinoupoleos Ave., Sepolia	Dead end between Therapeion Str. and Agias Sofias Str., Sepolia	Sepolia	2-10	1-7

== Φ ==
Name	Namesake	Length	Start	End	Neighbourhood(s)	Numbering (even)	Numbering (odd)
Filellinon; Φιλελλήνων	Philhellenes	358 m (1,175 ft)	Syntagma Sq., Syntagma	Vasilissis Amalias Ave., Plaka	Syntagma, Plaka	2-34	1-27
Frantzi, Amvrosiou; Φραντζή, Αμβροσίου	Amvrosios Frantzis	879 m (2,884 ft)	Andrea Syngrou Ave., Koukaki	Kasomouli Str., Kynosargous	Neos Kosmos, Kynosargous	2-94	1-85
Fylis; Φυλής	Phyle	2,110 m (6,920 ft)	Symis Str., Kato Patisia	Dead end between Averof Str. and Makedonias Str., Vathi	Vathi, Victoria, Agios Panteleimonas, Kato Patisia	2-302	1-273
Fokionos Negri; Φωκίωνος Νέγρη	Fokion Negris	769 m (2,523 ft)	Patission Str., Kypseli	Kanari Sq., Kypseli	Kypseli	2-64	1-85

== Χ ==
Name	Namesake	Length	Start	End	Neighbourhood(s)	Numbering (even)	Numbering (odd)
Chali, Adelfon; Χάλη, Αδελφών	Stefanos, Vasileios and Ioannis Chalis	50 m (160 ft)					
Charilaou Trikoupi; Χαριλάου Τρικούπη	Charilaos Trikoupis	1,480 m (4,860 ft)	Panepistimiou Str., Akadimia	Alexandras Ave., Exarcheia	Akadimia, Exarcheia	2-180	1-177
Heyden; Χέυδεν	Lodewijk van Heiden	491 m (1,611 ft)	Acharnon Str., Agios Panteleimonas	Mavrommataion Str., Victoria	Agios Panteleimonas, Victoria	2-40	1-35

== Ψ ==
Name	Namesake	Length	Start	End	Neighbourhood(s)	Numbering (even)	Numbering (odd)
Psallida; Ψαλλίδα	Athanasios Psalidas	159 m (522 ft)	Alexandras Ave., Exarcheia	Poulcherias Str., Exarcheia	Exarcheia	2-20	1-19
Psamathis; Ψαμάθης	Psamathe	104 m (341 ft)	Efyras Str., Filopappou	Eoleon Str., Filopappou	Filopappou	2-6	1-19
Psaromiligou; Ψαρομηλίγκου	Psaromiligos family	247 m (810 ft)	Eleftherias Sq., Kerameikos	Salaminos Str., Kerameikos	Kerameikos	2-30	1-33
Psaroudaki; Ψαρουδάκη	Georgios Psaroudakis	379 m (1,243 ft)	Ionias Ave., Kato Patisia	Stratigou Dagli Str., Kato Patisia	Kato Patisia	2-44	1-53
Psarra; Ψάρρα	Xenofon Psarras	146 m (479 ft)	Perrikou Str., Agios Eleftherios	Ioannidi Theologou Str., Agios Eleftherios	Agios Eleftherios	2-20	
Psarrou; Ψαρρού	Dimitrios Psarros	40 m (130 ft)	Perrikou Str., Girokomeio	Ioannidi Theologou Str., Girokomeio	Girokomeio	2-6	1-7
Psaron; Ψαρών	Psara	540 m (1,770 ft)	Karaiskaki Sq., Metaxourgeio	Neofytou Metaxa Str., Stathmos Larissis	Metaxourgeio, Stathmos Larissis	2-68	1-63
Psaonos; Ψαώνος	Psaon	58 m (190 ft)	Sosigenous Str., Gouva	Alfeionias Str., Gouva	Gouva	2-10	1-11
Psellou; Ψελλού	Michael Psellos	130 m (430 ft)	Alexandras Ave., Exarcheia	Poulcherias Str., Exarcheia	Exarcheia	2-16	1-7
Psiloriti; Ψηλορείτη	Mount Ida	75 m (246 ft)	Theodorou Deligianni Str., Stathmos Larissis	Samou Str., Stathmos Larissis	Stathmos Larissis	2-6	1-5
Psylla; Ψύλλα	Georgios Psyllas	69 m (226 ft)	Filellinon Str., Plaka	Souri Str., Plaka	Plaka	2-6	
Psyttaleias; Ψυττάλειας	Psyttaleia	138 m (453 ft)	Mytilinis Str., Kypseli	Dead end between Lesvou and Kallifrona Str., Kypseli	Kypseli	2-18	1-13
Psychari; Ψυχάρη	Ioannis Psycharis	480 m (1,570 ft)	Galatsiou Ave., Ano Patisia	Aetorachis Str., Ano Patisia	Ano Patisia	2-56	1-47

== Ω ==
Name	Namesake	Length	Start	End	Neighbourhood(s)	Numbering (even)	Numbering (odd)
Ogygou; Ωγύγου	Ogyges	148 m (486 ft)	Navarchou Apostoli Str., Psyri	Dead end between Sarri Str. and Tombazi Str., Psyri	Psyri	2-26	1-23
Okeanidon; Ωκεανίδων	Oceanids	195 m (640 ft)	Theognidos Str., Neos Kosmos	Timokreontos Str., Neos Kosmos	Neos Kosmos	2-24	1-23
Olenou; Ωλένου	Olenus	221 m (725 ft)	Evelpidon Str., Kypseli	Evias Str., Kypseli	Kypseli	2-30	1-21
Omol; Ωμόλ	Théophile Homolle	72 m (236 ft)	Neigy Str., Agios Eleftherios	Konstanta Str., Agios Eleftherios	Agios Eleftherios		1-9
Orias; Ωριάς	Oria	77 m (253 ft)	Aniforiti Str., Nea Filothei	Dead end between Aniforiti Str. and Vardounioti Str., Nea Filothei	Nea Filothei	2-12	1-9
Origenous; Ωριγένους	Origen	119 m (390 ft)	Asklipiou Str., Neapoli	Dafnomili Str., Neapoli	Neapoli	2-8	1-15
Orionos; Ωρίωνος	Orion	47 m (154 ft)	Sikinou Str., Kypseli	Kyprou Str., Kypseli	Kypseli	2-6	1-3
Orkart; Ωρκάρτ	David Urquhart	21 m (69 ft)	Diovouniotou Str., Filopappou	Gennaiou Kolokotroni Str., Filopappou	Filopappou		
Orologa; Ωρολογά	Gregory Orologas	71 m (233 ft)	Koniari Str., Kountouriotika	Michail Mela Str., Kountouriotika	Kountouriotika	2-8	
Oromedontos; Ωρομέδοντος	Mount Dikaios	201 m (659 ft)	Amfitritis Str., Ano Kypseli	Akastou Str., Ano Kypseli	Ano Kypseli	2-26	1-31
Orou; Ώρου	Horus	79 m (259 ft)	Agraion Str., Gouva	Dikaiarchou Str., Gouva	Gouva	2-12	1-9
Oropou; Ωρωπού	Oropos	1,500 m (4,900 ft) (Note: 1,270m. in Athens)	Andreopoulou Str., Ano Patisia	Demirdesiou Str., Perissos	Ano Patisia, Lamprini, Perissos	2-154 (Note: Including parts outside Athens)	1-159 (Note: Including parts outside Athens)
Otou; Ώτου	Otus of Cyllene	48 m (157 ft)	Amitoros Str., Gouva	Dead end between Amitoros Str. and Agaristis Str., Gouva	Gouva	2-6	1-5
