= List of sports clubs in Athens Municipality =

This List of sports clubs in Athens Municipality recounts the major sports clubs currently located in the Municipality of Athens. They may not always have had the same name or have originated in the same places. Some offer one sport; others, a variety.

Notable sport clubs based in Athens Municipality
Club	Founded	Sports	District	Achievements
Panellinios G.S.	1891	Basketball, Volleyball, Handball, Track and Field and others	Kypseli	Panhellenic titles in Basketball, Volleyball, Handball, many honours in Track and Field
Apollon Smyrni	1891 (originally in Smyrni)	Football, Basketball, Volleyball and others	Rizoupoli	Earlier long-time presence in A Ethniki
Ethnikos G.S. Athens	1893	Track and field, Wrestling, Shooting and others	Zappeion	Many honours in Athletics and Wrestling
Panathinaikos AO	1908 (originally as Football Club of Athens)	Football, Basketball, Volleyball, Water Polo, Track and Field and others	Ampelokipoi	One of the most successful Greek clubs, many titles in many sports. Most successful Greek club in European competitions (football and basketball)
Ilisiakos AO	1927	Football, Basketball	Ilisia	Earlier presence in A1 Ethniki basketball
Asteras Exarchion	1928 (originally as Achilleus Neapoleos)	Football, Basketball	Exarcheia	Earlier presence in A1 Ethniki women basketball
Ampelokipoi B.C.	1929 (originally as Hephaestus Athens)	Basketball	Ampelokipoi	Earlier presence in A1 Ethniki basketball
Thriamvos Athens	1930 (originally as Doxa Athens)	Football, Basketball	Neos Kosmos	Panhellenic title in women Basketball
Sporting B.C.	1936	Basketball	Patisia	Many Panhellenic titles in women Basketball
Pagrati B.C.	1938	Basketball	Pagrati	Earlier presence in A1 Ethniki
PAO Rouf	1947	Football	Rouf	Earlier presence in Gamma Ethniki
Petralona F.C.	1963	Football	Petralona	Earlier presence in Beta Ethniki
Attikos F.C.	1919	Football	Kolonos	Short presence in Gamma Ethniki
Athinais	1938	Football	Kypseli	Short presence in Gamma Ethniki
Gyziakos	1937	Basketball	Gyzi	Short presence in Beta Ethniki basketball
Aetos B.C.	1992	Basketball	Agios Panteleimonas	Earlier presence in A2 Ethniki Basketball
Athens Tennis Club	1895	Tennis		Important offer for the Greek tennis
