= Erythros Stavros =

Erythros Stavros Ερυθρός Σταυρός
- Neighborhood
- Location within Athens
- Coordinates: 37°59′29″N 23°46′9″E
- Country: Greece
- Region: Attica
- City: Athens
- Postal code: 115 24
- Area code: 210
- Website: www.cityofathens.gr

Erythros Stavros (Greek: Ερυθρός Σταυρός, pronounced [eɾiˈθɾos staˈvɾos]), meaning "Red Cross", is a neighborhood of Athens, located between the districts of Ambelokipoi, Ellinoroson and Girokomeio. It was named after the Red Cross Hospital, which is located in the center. It is also considered part of the Ambelokipi neighborhood. Apart from the hospital, this district is home to the Police School and the Ministry of Justice, Transparency and Human Rights. It is serviced by the Line 3 of Athens Metro and a plurality of bus lines.
