= Father Antonios Papanikolaou =

Father Antonios Papanikolaou (born 1971) is a Greek orthodox cleric and philanthropist.

== Early life ==
Father Antonios was born in Chios, a Greek island in the Aegean Sea. He was raised in Drapetsona, a poor suburban area near Athens. He has 4 brothers. He studied education and theology. Right after his graduation, he took part in Christian missions in African countries.

== Work ==
In 1998 Father Antonios, then 26 years old, was ordinated a priest and founded the charity "Kivotos tou Kosmou" (Ark of the World) at Kolonos, an impoverished neighbourhood of Athens. He kept Kivotos independent from the official Church of Greece.

In 2015, amidst the Greek refugee crisis Kivotos tou Kosmou expanded to the island of Chios, to host refugees. It has since helped hundreds of orphans or abandoned children. Father Antonios utilized his basketball skills to approach teenagers. His inclusion of immigrants met the criticism of far-right activists and politicians.

In 2015, Kivotos also expanded in Pogoniani, a village near the city of Ioannina, with an agricultural school in a rural Greek area, that received European Union's GENE Global Education Award 2020/2021.

In 2020 he co-authored the book GROW – Stories of Management and Leadership.

In 2022, after allegations of child abuse at the Kivotos, Archbishop Ieronymos launched an inquiry.

== Personal life ==
Father Antonios is married.

== Awards ==
- 2008, Awarded by the Academy of Athens for his work helping unprotected children in Athens.
- 2018, European Citizens' Prize, by European Parliament.
- 2019, The Mary Chirwa Award for Courageous Leadership
