= Colonus (Attica) =

Deme of the phyle Aegeis of ancient Attica

Coordinates: 37°59′57″N 23°43′19″E

Colonus or Kolonos (/kəˈloʊnəs/; Ancient Greek: Κολωνός, translit. Kolōnós) was a deme of the phyle Aegeis, of ancient Attica, celebrated as the deme of Sophocles, and the scene of one of the poet's tragedies, was situated ten stadia from the gate of the city, called Dipylum, near Plato's Academy and the river Cephissus. It derived its name from two small but conspicuous heights, which rise from the plain a little to the north of the academy. Hence it is called by Sophocles "the white Colonus". It was under the especial care of Poseidon, and is called by Thucydides the ἱερόν of this god. It is frequently called Colonus Hippius or Kolonos Hippeios (Κολωνός Ἵππειος) or Hippius Colonus or Hippeios Kolonos (Ἵππειος Κολωνός), both meaning "Colonus of the Horses", to distinguish it from the "Colonus Agoraeus" in Athens. Besides the temple of Poseidon, it possessed a sacred grove of the Eumenides, altars of Athena Hippia, Demeter, Zeus, and Prometheus, together with sanctuaries of Peirithous, Theseus, Oedipus, and Adrastus. According to Greek mythology, Oedipus was buried there, as described by Sophocles, who was born there, in his Oedipus at Colonus. The natural beauties of the spot are described by Sophocles in the magnificent chorus: "Here the nightingale, a constant guest, trills her clear note under the trees of green glades, dwelling amid the wine-dark ivy and the god's inviolate foliage, rich in berries and fruit, unvisited by sun, unvexed by the wind of any storm. Here the reveller Dionysus ever walks the ground, companion of the nymphs that nursed him."

In the Athenian oligarchic revolution of 411 BCE, the oligarchs convened at the sanctuary of Poseidon Hippios at Colonus to frame their new constitution.

The site of Colonus is at Agia Eleousa in the modern neighborhood of Kolonos, which is named after the site.

== In literature ==
- At the beginning of Oedipus at Colonus by the playwright Sophocles, a character named Xenos describes the area to the blind outcast Oedipus. He claims that the area is sacred to the sea-god Poseidon and to Prometheus, the Titan who brought fire to mankind. It is also sacred to a former ruler and charioteer named Colonus, for whom the region was named and who is now venerated as a hero-god. Later, Oedipus prays to the Eumenides to allow him to take refuge there. At the end of the play, Oedipus' death and burial are described, but his gravesite is to be kept secret to avoid desecration.
- The Gospel at Colonus by Lee Breuer is a modern adaptation of Sophocles' play employing gospel music.
