= Kolokynthou =

Kolokynthou Κολοκυνθού
- Neighborhood
- Location within Athens
- Coordinates: 37°59′48″N 23°42′13″E
- Country: Greece
- Region: Attica
- City: Athens
- Postal code: 104 42
- Area code: 210
- Website: www.cityofathens.gr

Kolokynthou (Greek: Κολοκυνθού pronounced [ko.lo.cinˈθu]) is a neighborhood of Athens, Greece. In the past, in this area there were farms and gardens.

The neighbourhood's name likely relates with the Greek word kolokythi ("zucchini") that was ordinary in the gardens. Today this area is an industrial zone between Colonus and Peristeri.
