= Attiki, Athens =

Attiki Αττική
- Neighborhood
- Location within Athens municipality
- Coordinates: 37°59′47″N 23°43′21″E
- Country: Greece
- Region: Attica
- City: Athens
- Postal code: 104 40
- Area code: 210
- Website: www.cityofathens.gr

Attiki (Greek: Αττική pronounced [a.tiˈci]) is a neighbourhood of Athens, located northwest of the city centre.

The neighbourhood and its central square (Attiki Square) are named after Attica Railways, a railway company that constructed the line Athens-Kifissia-Lavrion. Attiki station was the terminus of this line.

== History ==
During antiquity, Attiki was part of Kolonos and was considered the most aristocratic neighbourhood of Ancient Athens, owing to its proximity to the Cephissus river. Nowadays, this river is hidden under Leoforos Kifissou.

The area was extensively urbanised during the 1960s and 1970s.

== Administrative divisions ==
Plateia Attikis is an ambiguous name as it refers to the square, the general area and official subdivisions of the Municipality of Athens. It is indeed both the name of a municipal district, a subdivion of the 6th municipal community., and one of its subdivision, i.e. a municipal neighbourghood.

This municipal district comprises four municipal neighbourhoods: Plateia Attikis (South-West), Agios Panteleimon (North-West), Aristotelous (North-East), and Plateia Viktorias (South-East).

Of note, the Attiki station, which gives its name to the area, is not included in this municipal district, but in another municipal neighbourhood, also called Plateia Attikis, part of the Nirvana municipal district.
