= Agios Eleftherios, Athens =

Agios Eleftherios Άγιος Ελευθέριος
- Neighborhood
- Location within municipality of Athens
- Coordinates: 38°1′17″N 23°43′50″E
- Country: Greece
- Region: Attica
- City: Athens
- Postal code: 111 43, 111 44, 111 45
- Area code: 210
- Website: www.cityofathens.gr

Agios Eleftherios (Greek: Άγιος Ελευθέριος pronounced [ˈaʝos elefˈθeri.os]) is a neighborhood of the center of Athens, Greece.

The neighbourhood takes its name from the church of the same name on Acharnon Street.

== Transport ==
Agios Eleftherios metro station on Line 1 of the Athens Metro serves the area.

== Historical population ==
Year	Population
1951	1,235
1961	1,734
1971	2,103
1981	2,843
1991	3,298
2001	3,929
