= Neapoli, Athens =

Neapoli Νεάπολη
- Neighborhood
- Location within Athens
- Country: Greece
- Region: Attica
- City: Athens
- Postal code: 114 71, 114 72
- Area code: 210
- Website: www.cityofathens.gr

Neapoli (Greek: Νεάπολη pronounced [neˈa.po.li]) is a neighborhood of Athens, Greece. It is located on the northern slope of Mount Lycabettus.

Neapoli means 'new city.' The name originally comes from the fact that it was a new area of Athens built beyond Praxitelous and Evripidou streets during the decades when the city was starting to become urbanised. Eventually, the name Neapoli came to refer to only the eastern side, while the western side became known as Metaxourgeio. Neapoli was built in the mid 19th century by constructors, plasterers and marble constructors who came in Athens searching for a better life. The land there was then outside the zoning area and consequently cheaper.

The area is well known for book publishing and some of the oldest bookstores of Athens are found there.
