= Akadimia, Athens =

Akadimia Ακαδημία
- Neighborhood
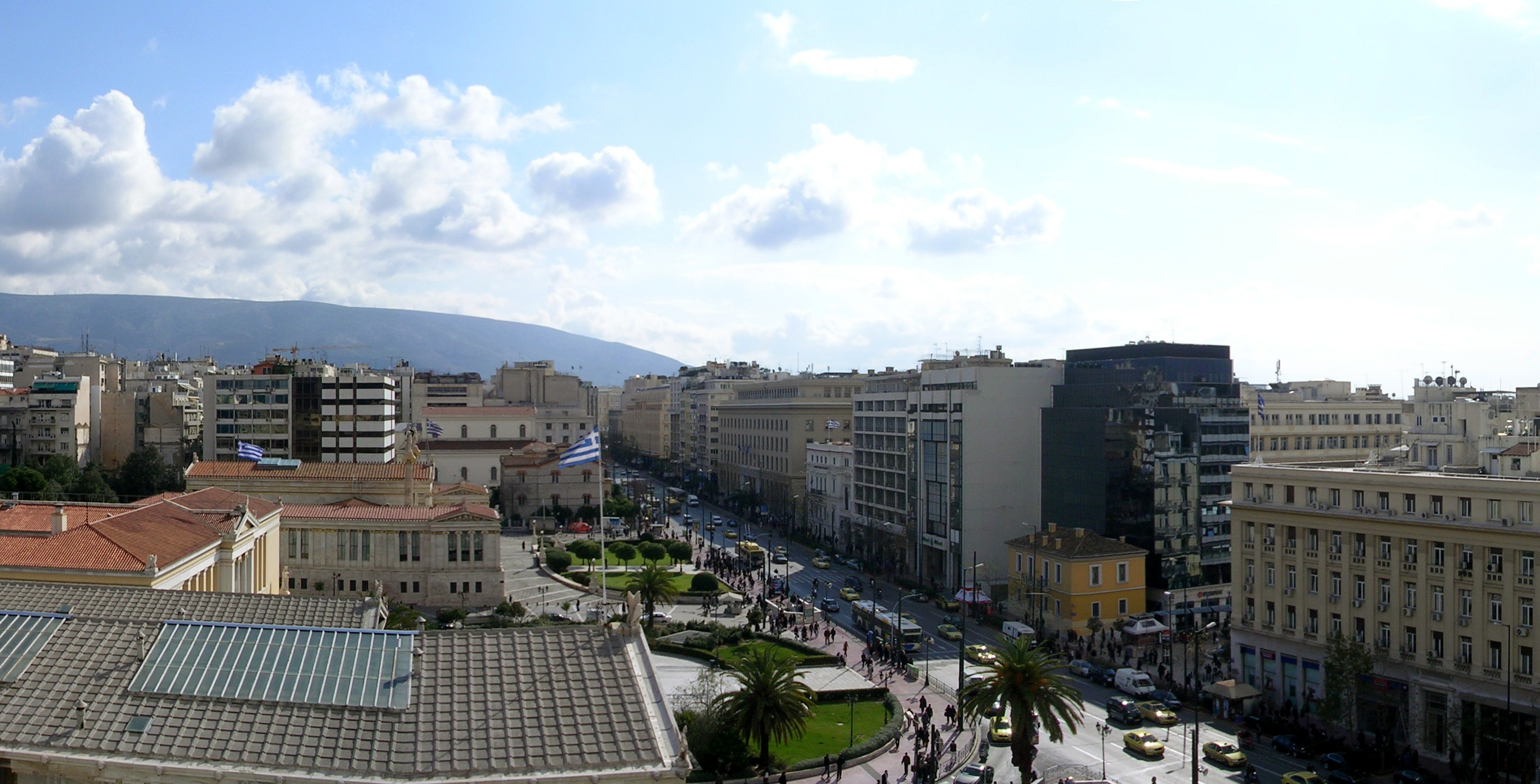
- Panepistimiou Street from above

- Location within municipality of Athens
- Coordinates: 37°58′48″N 23°44′3″E
- Country: Greece
- Region: Attica
- City: Athens
- Postal Code: 106 79
- Area code: 210
- Website: www.cityofathens.gr

Akadimia (Greek: Ακαδημία, pronounced [a.ka.ðiˈmi.a]), literally "Academy", is a neighborhood in central Athens, Greece.

Located directly north and slight west of Syntagma Square, it is bounded by Akadimias Street, Panepistimiou Street, Solonos Street and Stadiou Street. It is named after the Academy of Athens, since this was the first educational building to be built there in 1859. One of the busiest areas of Athens, many important buildings are found here.

The Panepistimio metro station serves Line 2 of the Athens Metro, while there is a tram stop at Plateia Klafthmonos.

== Notable buildings ==
- Academy of Athens
- Athens Law School
- Catholic Church of Agios Dionysios
- Central Offices of the Bank of Greece
- Council of State
- Eye Hospital
- National and Kapodistrian University of Athens
- National Library of Greece
- State Legal Council
