= Gouva, Athens =

Gouva Γούβα
- Neighborhood
- Location within Athens
- Coordinates: 37°57′31″N 23°44′16″E
- Country: Greece
- Region: Attica
- City: Athens
- Postal code: 116 31, 116 32
- Area code: 210
- Website: www.cityofathens.gr

Gouva (Greek: Γούβα, pronounced [ˈɣu.va]), also known as Agios Artemios (Greek: Άγιος Αρτέμιος, pronounced [ˈaʝos aɾˈte.mi.os]) is a neighborhood of Athens, Greece.

It is located to the southeast of central Athens between the First Cemetery of Athens and Dafni.

The district built at the beginning of the 20th century, initially by destitute Athenians. Later in this district were settled refugees from Asia Minor and laborers from Greek countryside.
