= Kynosargous =

Kynosargous Κυνοσάργους
- Neighborhood
- Location within Athens
- Coordinates: 37°57′47″N 23°43′50″E
- Country: Greece
- Region: Attica
- City: Athens
- Postal code: 116 36, 117 43
- Area code: 210
- Website: www.cityofathens.gr

Kynosargous (Greek: Κυνοσάργους [ci.noˈsaɾ.ɣus]), up until 1908 known as Dourgouti (Note: Nowadays, though, "Dourgouti" refers to a sub-neighborhood of the adjacent Neos Kosmos neighborhood.) (Greek: Δουργούτι [ðuɾˈɣuti]), is a small neighborhood of Athens, Greece.

It is named after the Cynosarges which is thought to have been in the area in antiquity.

It is served by Syngrou–Fix station on Line 2 of the Athens Metro.
