= Thymarakia =

Thymarakia Θυμαράκια
- Neighborhood
- Location within municipality of Athens
- Coordinates: 38°00′24″N 23°43′27″E
- Country: Greece
- Region: Attica
- City: Athens
- Postal code: 104 45
- Area code: 210
- Website: www.cityofathens.gr

Thymarakia (Greek: Θυμαράκια, pronounced [θi.maˈɾaca]) is a neighborhood of the center of Athens. It takes its name from the Greek word 'θυμάρι' which means 'thyme', which was formerly plentiful in the area.

The area is served by Agios Nikolaos metro station on line 1 of the Athens Metro.
