= Psyri =

Psyri Ψυρή
- Neighborhood
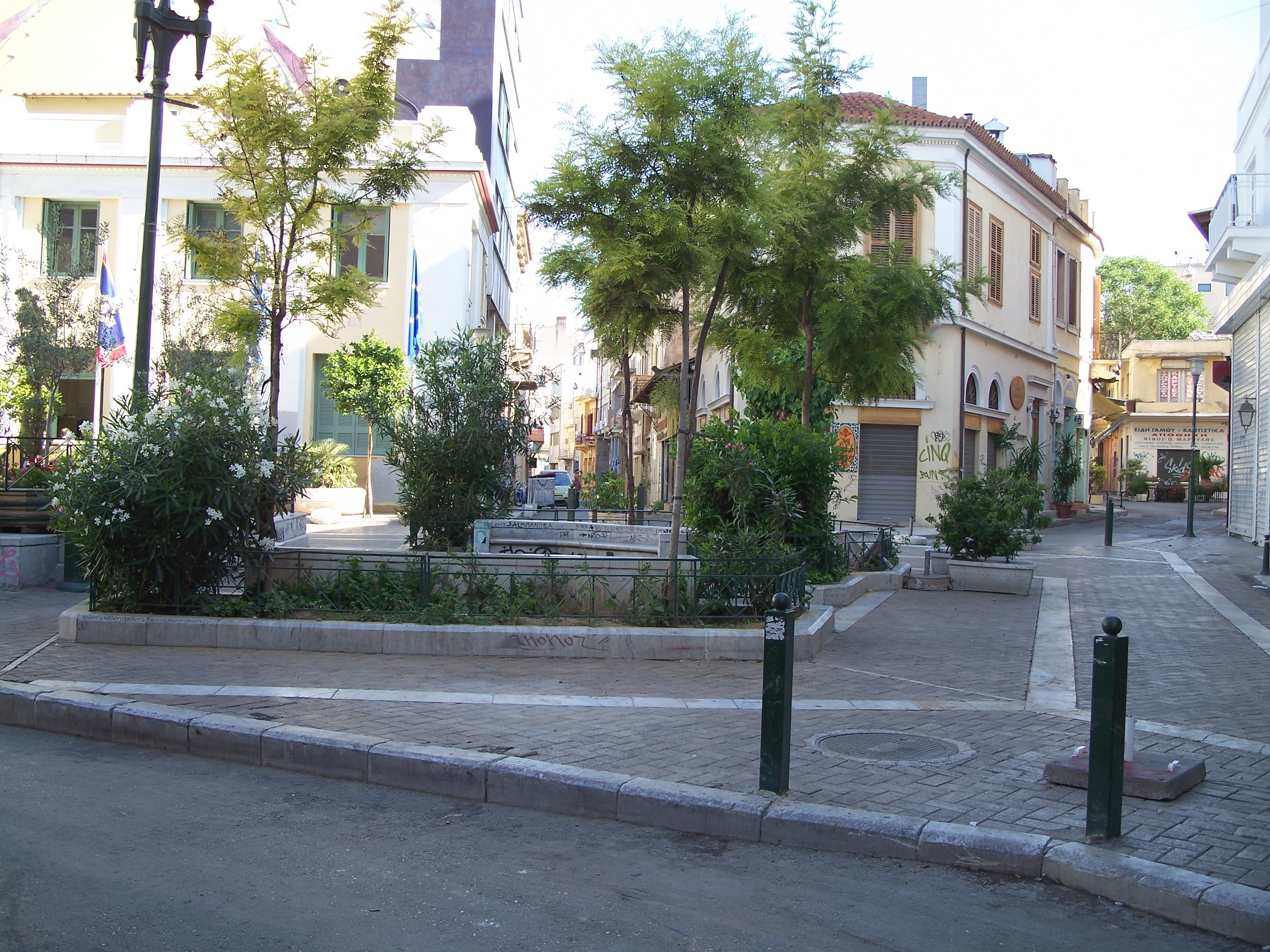
- Iroon Square

- Location within Athens
- Coordinates: 37°58′40″N 23°43′30″E
- Country: Greece
- Region: Attica
- City: Athens
- Postal code: 105 54
- Area code: 210
- Website: www.cityofathens.gr

Psyri or Psiri or Psyrri or Psirri (Greek: Ψυρή or Ψυρρή, pronounced [psiˈri]) is a gentrified neighbourhood in Athens, Greece, today known for its restaurants, bars, live music tavernas, and small number of hotels.

== Description ==
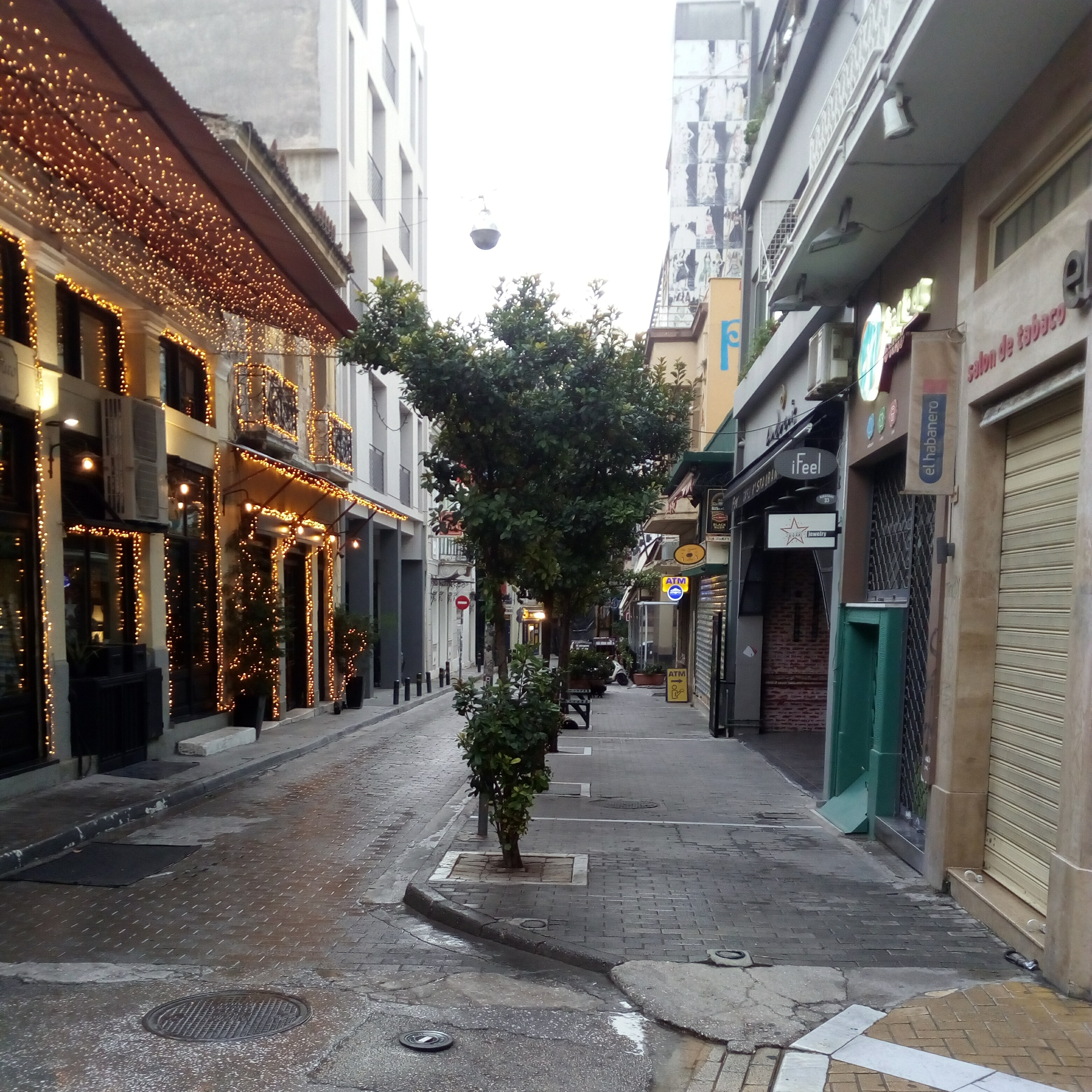
Streetview in Psyri.

Until the early 1990s, Psyri, one of the oldest quarters of Athens, had an ill reputation, but it has now become one of the most fashionable and trendy choices in the centre of Athens for accommodation, entertainment and food hospitality.

The central square of Psyri is called "Heroes square" (πλατεία Ηρώων, plateia Iroon), because the streets leading to it carry names of heroes of the Greek War of Independence (e.g. Karaiskakis, Miaoulis). In the era of the 'old Athens' (namely, during the last quarter of the 19th century), the nickname "plateia of Heroes" was a derisive reference to koutsavakides (κουτσαβάκηδες), who used it as their hangout.

== History ==
Lord Byron was accommodated in the neighbourhood during his stay in Athens and here is where he wrote the poem "Maid of Athens". The most famous Greek inhabitant of Psyri was Alexandros Papadiamantis who lived in the area for more than two decades.
