= Vathi, Athens =

Vathi Βάθη
- Neighborhood
- Location within municipality of Athens
- Coordinates: 37°59′19″N 23°43′35″E
- Country: Greece
- Region: Attica
- City: Athens
- Postal code: 115 24
- Area code: 210
- Website: www.cityofathens.gr

Vathi (Greek: Βάθη) is a neighborhood of the center of Athens. It is north of Athens' downtown. The center of the neighborhood is Vathis Square (Plateía Váthis).
