= Kountouriotika =

Kountouriotika Κουντουριώτικα
- Neighborhood
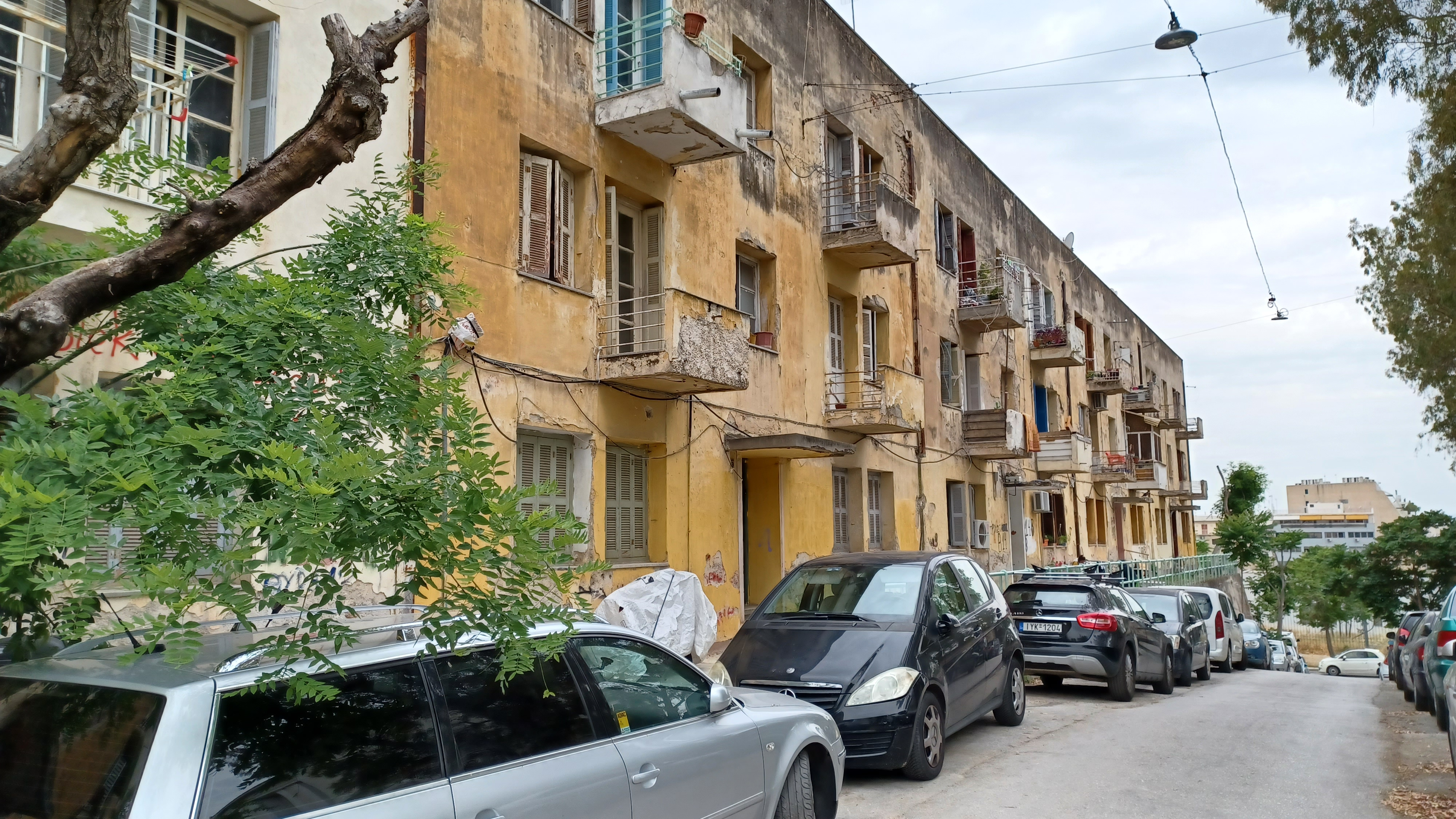
- Prosfygika in Kountouriotika

- Location within Athens
- Coordinates: 37°59′13″N 23°45′32″E
- Country: Greece
- Region: Attica
- City: Athens
- Postal code: 115 21, 115 22
- Area code: 210
- Website: www.cityofathens.gr

Kountouriotika (Greek: Κουντουριώτικα pronounced [kunduˈɾʝotika]) is a small neighborhood of Athens, Greece, named after the admiral and later President of Greece Pavlos Kountouriotis. It is located within Ampelokipoi.
