= Michail Nomikos =

- Born: 1840s Amorgos
- Died: March 1900; Athens, Greece
- Occupation: Newspaper Publisher
- Years active: 1870s - 1900
- Known for: Benefactor
- Notable work: Lighthouse of Alexandria, Kairon

Michail Nomikos (Greek: Μιχαήλ Νομικος [nomi kos']; 1840s – March 1900) was a Greek language newspaper publisher and Greek benefactor who left land to Athens, Greece for the establishment of a public school.

== Early life and career ==
He was born in the village of Lagada on the island of Amorgos. Educated in Athens, he relocated to Egypt in the 1870s. Initially, he worked in a Jewish printing house where he learned the trade. He went on to found and edit a Greek language newspaper, the Lighthouse of Alexandria. He went on to publish the newspaper Kairon, to serve the Greek population in Egypt, outside Cairo.

=== Return to Greece ===
In 1882, the Anglo-Egyptian War broke out and the United Kingdom's fleet and Royal Marines invaded Alexandria after a riot broke out and killed a large number of Europeans living there. After this event, Nomikos returned to Greece. He first settled in Amorgos and ran for elected office. He was unsuccessful and soon moved to Athens.

He purchased a large amount of land near rural Patission Street. Nomikos never married and had no children and upon his death, he left all his land, about 7 acres of land, to the City of Athens with the proviso that a school be built on it.

== Legacy ==
The school that was first built as a sanitorium for children with tuberculosis and was expanded during the 1930s when Georgios Papandreou was Minister of Education. It became the Athens 8th Lyceum and Gymnasion which educated generations of Athenians.

Odos Michail Nomikou (Michail Nomikou Street), which is located on land that he donated, is named for the benefactor and newspaper publisher.
