= Amerikis Square =

Square in Athens, Greece

Coordinates: 38.00239°N 23.73367°E

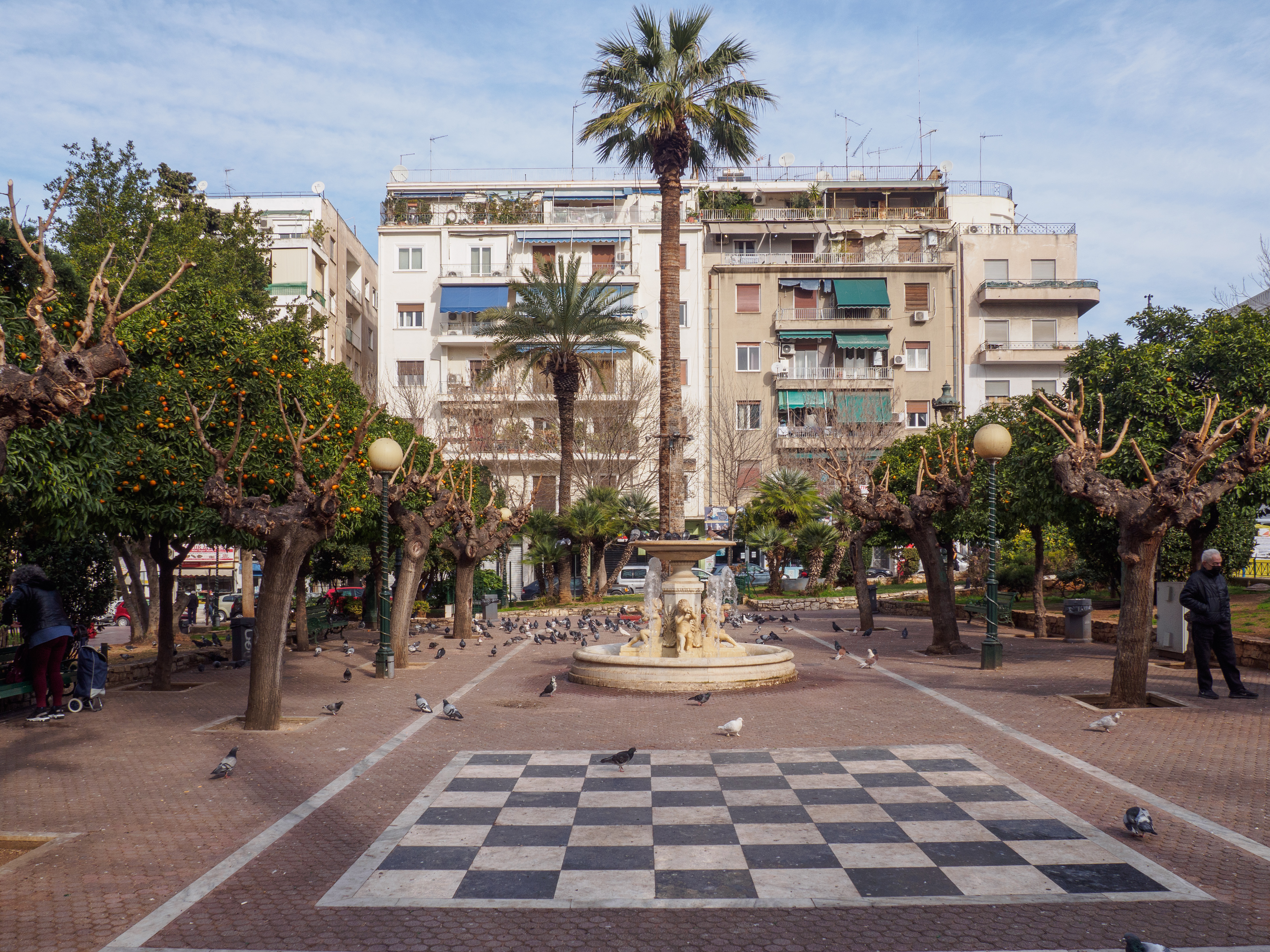
View of Amerikis square

Amerikis Square (Greek: Πλατεία Αμερικής, Plateia Amerikis, "America Square") is located in central Athens, Greece. It is an open area adjacently to Patision Street, on the western borders of Kypseli. Formerly called Agamon Square, literally "square of the unmarried", the neighbourhood around the square includes, along with central Kypseli, many modernist apartment buildings built during the 1930s.
