= Probonas =

Probonas Προμπονάς
- Neighborhood
- Location within Athens municipality
- Coordinates: 38°1′18″N 23°44′37″E
- Country: Greece
- Region: Attica
- City: Athens
- Postal code: 111 43
- Area code: 210
- Website: www.cityofathens.gr

Probonas or Promponas (Greek: Προμπονάς pronounced [pɾoboˈnas]) is a northern neighborhood of Athens, Greece.

Probonas is the northernmost neighborhood of Athens, located on its north-west angle. It borders Ano Patissia to the south, the town of Nea Chalkidona to the west, Perissos to the north and Rizoupoli, along with metro line 1 line to the east. On the west of Promponas, runs the torrent of Podoniftis, which is the border between the city of Athens and the municipality of Filadelfeia-Chalkidona.

Its name derives from Dimitrios Probonas (1874–1949), MP and doctor.

== Transport ==
Ano Patisia metro station and Perissos metro station on Line 1 of the Athens Metro serve the area. There are bus lines passing from its south part on Chalkidos Street. The other main streets of the neighborhood are Antheon and Probona.

== Landmarks ==
- Probona Park (alsos)
- Podoniftis torrent
- Athens' central flower market, Antheon St. 21-23 / Probona St. 26
- Two of the first tall buildings of Athens are situated in the area, constructed in the '70s (18-storey and 15-storey high), Tirinthos St. & Amipsiou St.
