= Treis Gefyres =

Treis Gefyres Τρεις Γέφυρες
- Neighborhood
- Location within municipality of Athens
- Coordinates: 38°0′56″N 23°43′34″E
- Country: Greece
- Region: Attica
- City: Athens
- Postal code: 111 43, 111 45
- Area code: 210
- Website: www.cityofathens.gr

Treis Gefyres (Greek: Τρεις Γέφυρες pronounced [tɾis ˈʝe.fi.ɾes]) meaning 'Three bridges' is a neighborhood in the center of Athens, Greece. It is located in north-west of the centre (Syntagma square) of Athens, in the point where the railways meets Cephissus river. It borders with Kato Patissia and Peristeri. Its name derived from the bridges that located in this point (the Greek word gefyra means bridge).
