= Sepolia =

Sepolia Σεπόλια
- Neighbourhood
- Location within Athens municipality
- Coordinates: 38°00′10″N 23°42′49″E
- Country: Greece
- Region: Attica
- City: Athens
- Postal code: 104 43, 104 44
- Area code: 210
- Website: cityofathens.gr

Sepolia (Greek: Σεπόλια pronounced [seˈpo.ʎa]) is a neighborhood in Athens, Greece. The Sepolia metro station is situated in the neighborhood. Sepolia owes to its name in the Greek phrase esopolis (έσω πόλις), which means "inside the city". Sepolia was a remote settlement until the latter part of the 19th century, a few kilometers away from Athens. The Greek Census of that period didn't include Sepolia as part of Athens. The Census of 1879, for example, refers to a population of 278 inhabitants. During the following years, Sepolia joined Athens as a result of a population explosion.

== Notable people ==
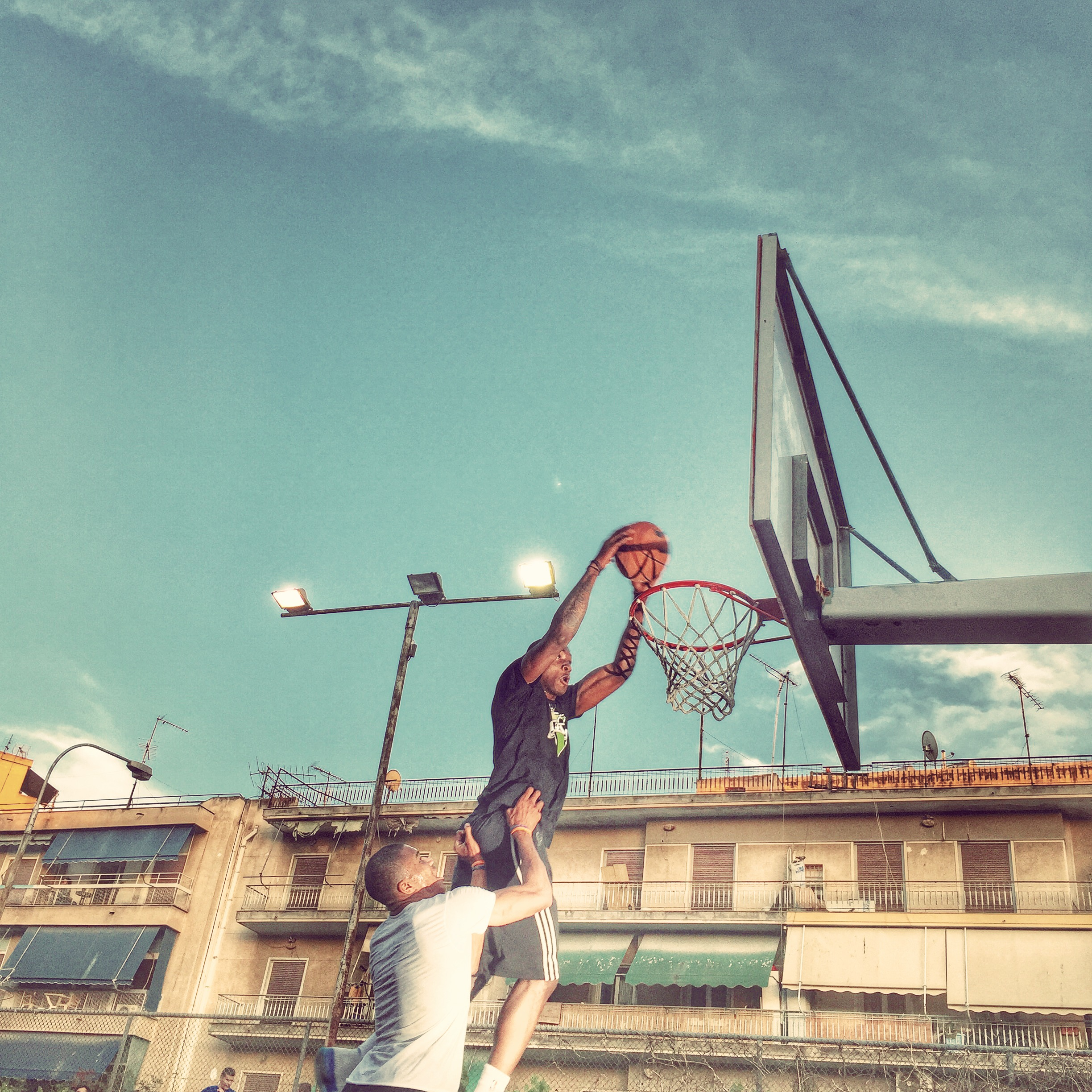
Giannis Antetokounmpo and Thanasis Antetokounmpo playing basketball at a local court in Sepolia, Athens in 2015

- Giannis Antetokounmpo (1994) – professional basketball player, 2018–19, 2019–20 NBA's Regular Season MVP and 2021 NBA Champion and NBA Finals Most Valuable Player
- Kostas Antetokounmpo (1997) – professional NBA basketball player and 2020 NBA Champion
- Thanasis Antetokounmpo (1992) – professional NBA basketball player and 2021 NBA Champion
- Alex Antetokounmpo (2001) – professional basketball player
- Argyris Chionis (1943–2011) – poet

== Transport ==
In the past, it was also served by the Liosion train station and by tram 8.
