= Polygono, Athens =

Neighborhood in Athens, Attica, Hellas

Polygono Πολύγωνο
- Neighborhood
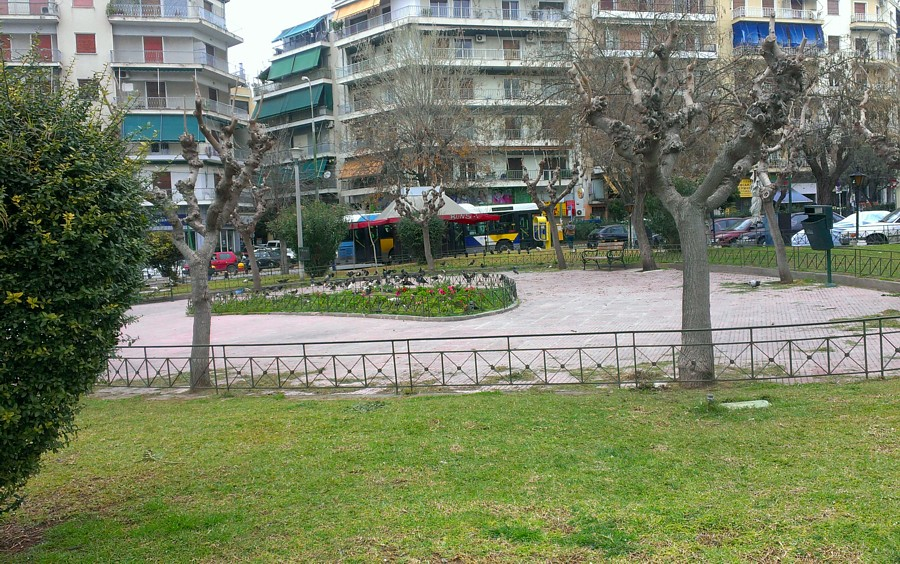

- Location within Athens
- Coordinates: 37°59′54″N 23°45′32″E
- Country: Greece
- Region: Attica
- City: Athens
- Postal code: 114 76, 115 72
- Area code: 210
- Website: www.cityofathens.gr

Polygono (Greek: Πολύγωνο pronounced [poˈli.ɣo.no]) is a neighbourhood of Athens, Greece. In contrast to surrounding areas, it is not as densely populated, owing to a ban on the construction of multi-storey buildings.

The courts for Athens are located in this district.

The name of the area derives from a polygonal platform which once used to be set up for parades, opposite what are now the courthouses. The ancient name of the area was Anchesmos (Greek: Αγχεσμός). The area is also sometimes referred to as Gypareika (Greek: Γυπαρέικα), because Pavlos Gyparis, personal guard to Eleftherios Venizelos once owned a property there. For this reason, the area is also sometimes known as "Eleftherios Venizelos' neighbourhood" and its central park is named after him.
