= Philopappou =

Philopappou Φιλοπάππου
- Neighborhood
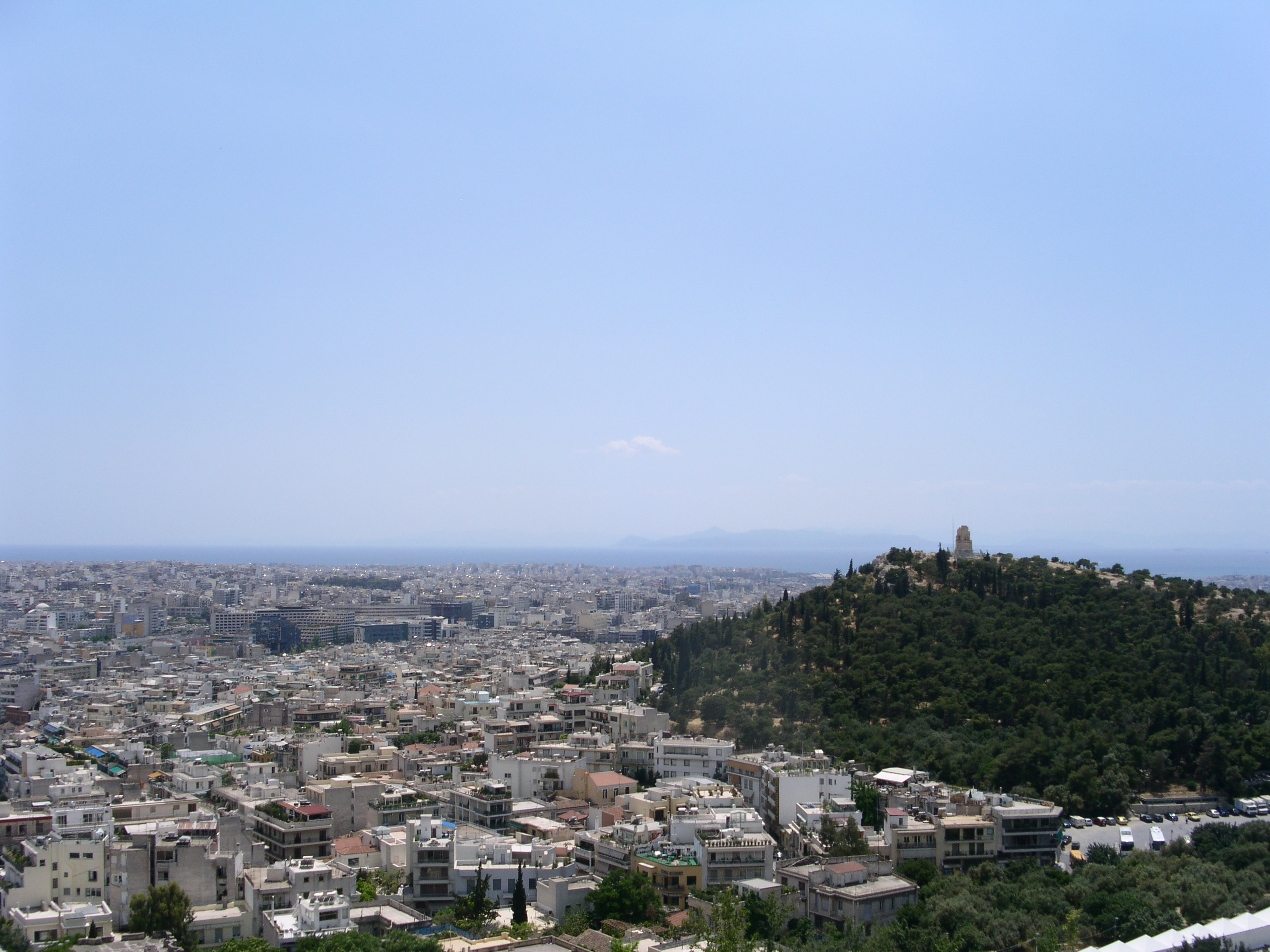
- Philopappou and Koukaki from the Parthenon

- Location within Athens
- Coordinates: 37°57′54″N 23°42′58″E
- Country: Greece
- Region: Attica
- City: Athens
- Postal code: 117 41
- Area code: 210
- Website: www.cityofathens.gr

Philopappou or Filopappou (Greek: Φιλοπάππου pronounced [fi.loˈpa.pu]) is a small neighborhood of Athens, Greece south of the Philopappos Monument, from which it takes its name.

== Philopappou Hill ==
Filopappou Hill or Mouson Hill or Seggio Hill is a hill in Athens located opposite, southwest, from the Acropolis. It is connected to the adjacent hills of Asteroskopeio (hill of Nymphs) and Pnyka. At its top, there is the monument of Philopappos which was erected by Philopappos - a prince of the Kingdom of Commagene in the Roman Empire during the 1st century and 2nd century - who gave his name to the hill. Around the hill of Filopappou is the district of the same name as well as the districts of Koukaki, Asyrmatos, Petralona and Acropolis. On the south side of the hill there is also the Dora Stratou theater. The oldest name "Segio hill" dates back to the time of the Frankish occupation and was preserved until the beginning of the last century. The etymology of this name apparently comes from the Italian word segno, (segno = signal, signal), perhaps because during the Frankish period there was a kind of signaling station on the southern projection of the top of the hill that received and transmitted signals and information with other observation towers, along coasts and islands of the Saronic, which mainly concerned the appearance of fleets or pirate ships.

In 2002, in the framework of the Unification of Archaeological Sites of Athens and later under the Ministry of Culture Michalis Liapis, an effort was started to have the hill of Filopappos fenced off, to be visitable at scheduled times, and the plans included its inclusion in the single ticket of the sites of the unification. In November 2002, an active residents' movement was formed, which prevented these plans and worked to defend open access to the hill, eventually winning the battle and legally at STE in 2015.

== Transport ==
The nearest stations of the Athens Metro are Petralona on Line 1 or Syngrou–Fix on Line 2. The area is also served by a trolleybus stop (line 15) of the same name as the area.

== Gallery ==
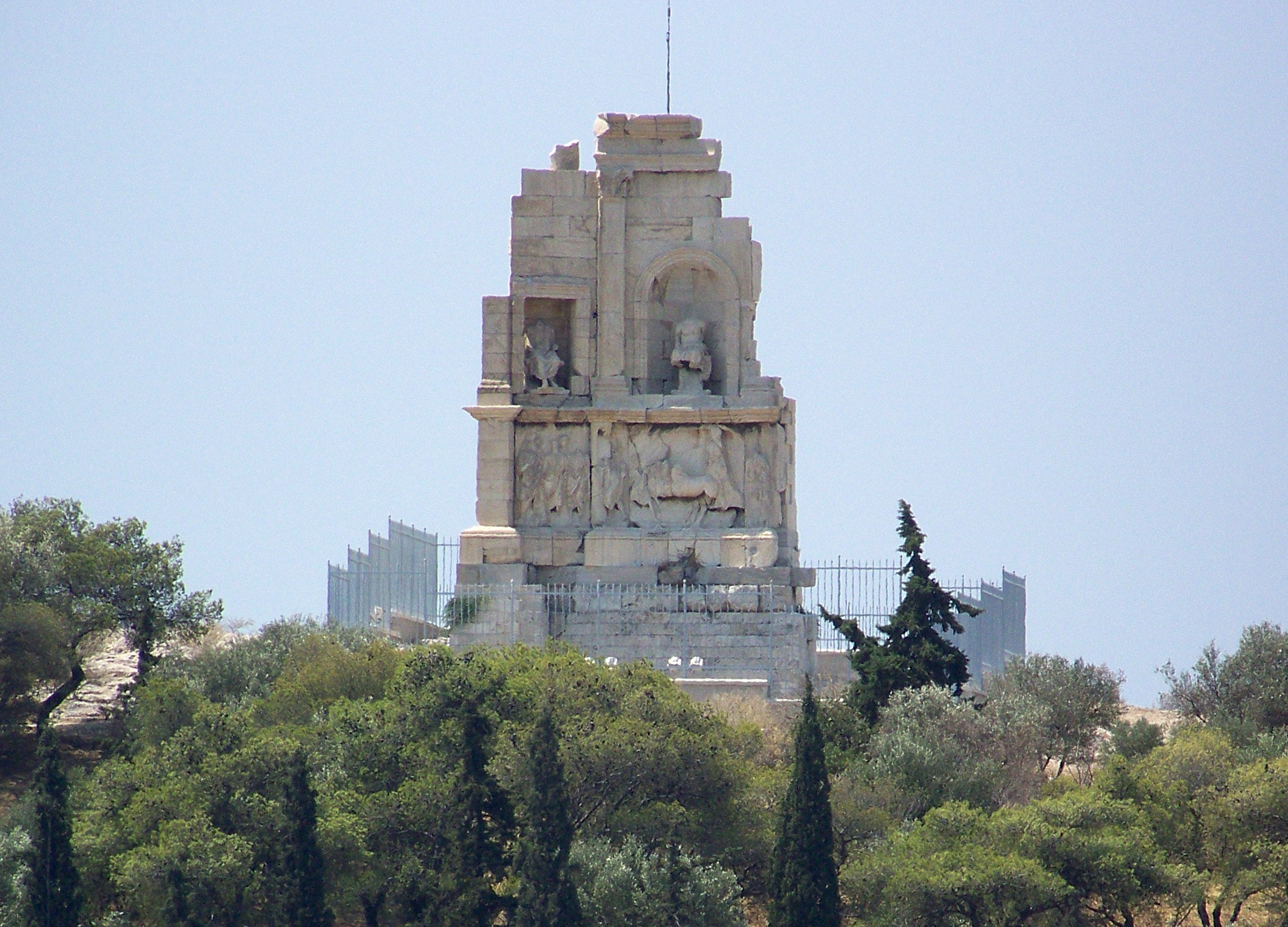
Philopappos Hill in Athens

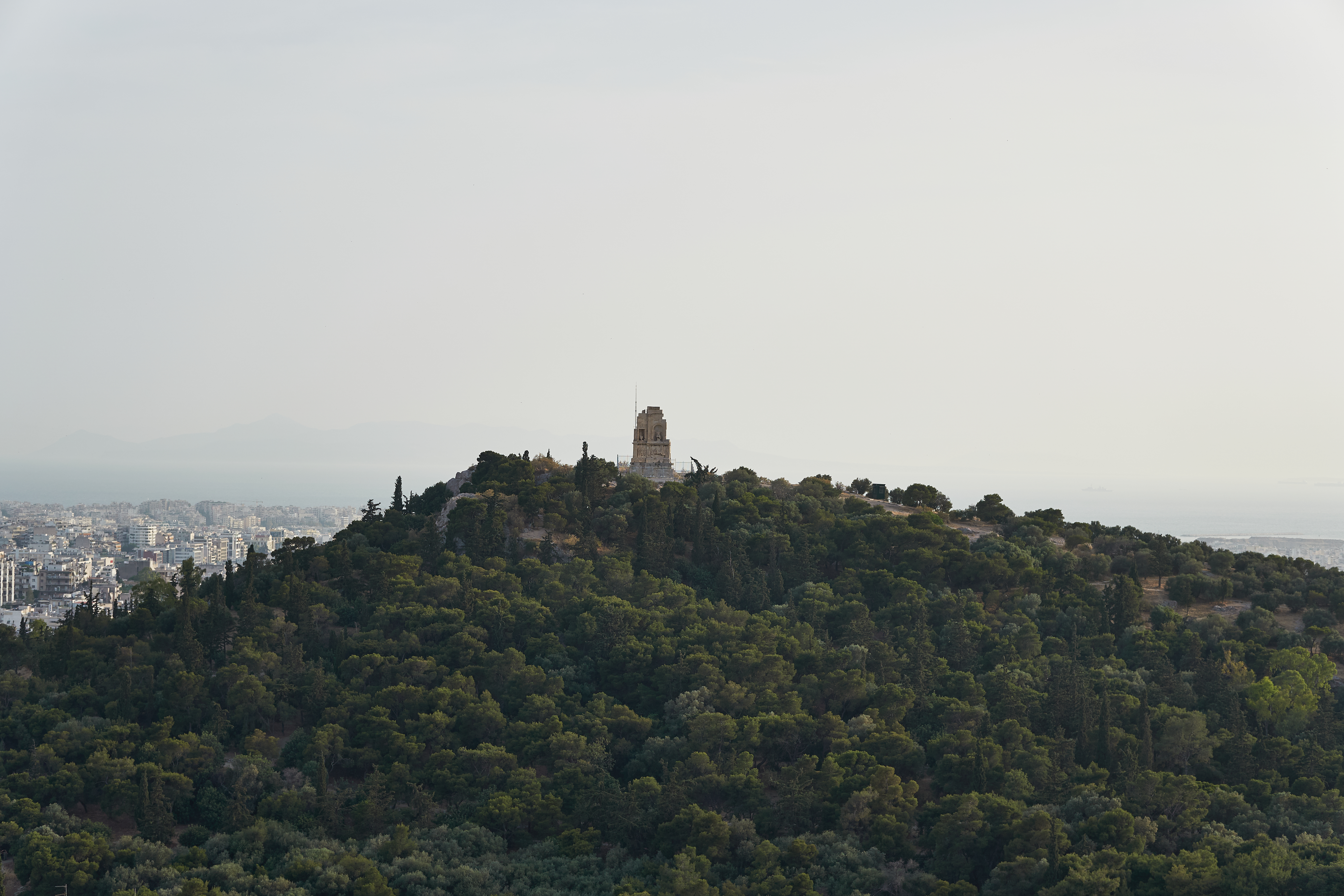
Philopappos Hill and Philopappos Monument from the Acropolis

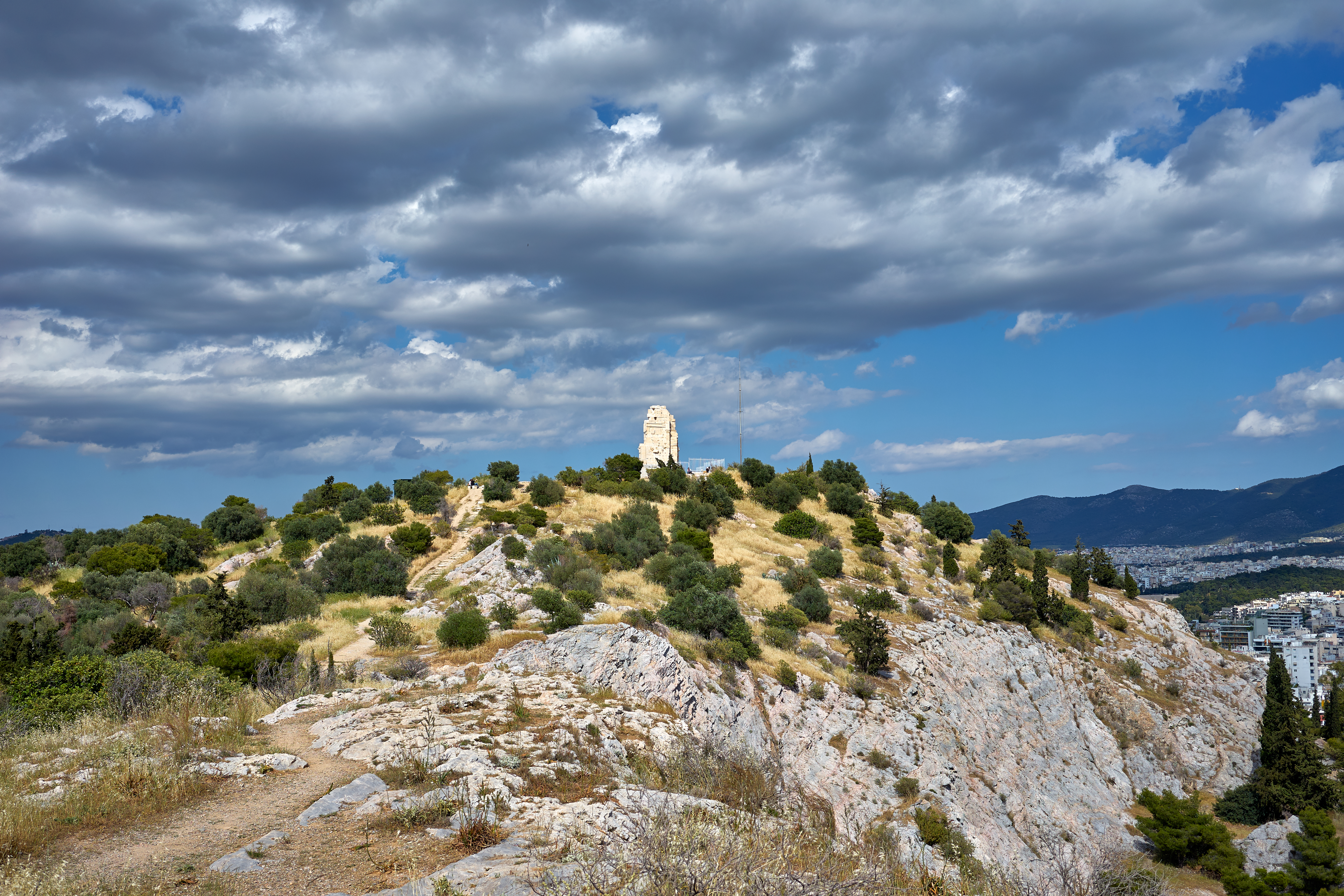
The Philopappos Monument from Philopappos Hill
