= Kallimarmaro, Athens =

Kallimarmaro Καλλιμάρμαρο
- Neighborhood
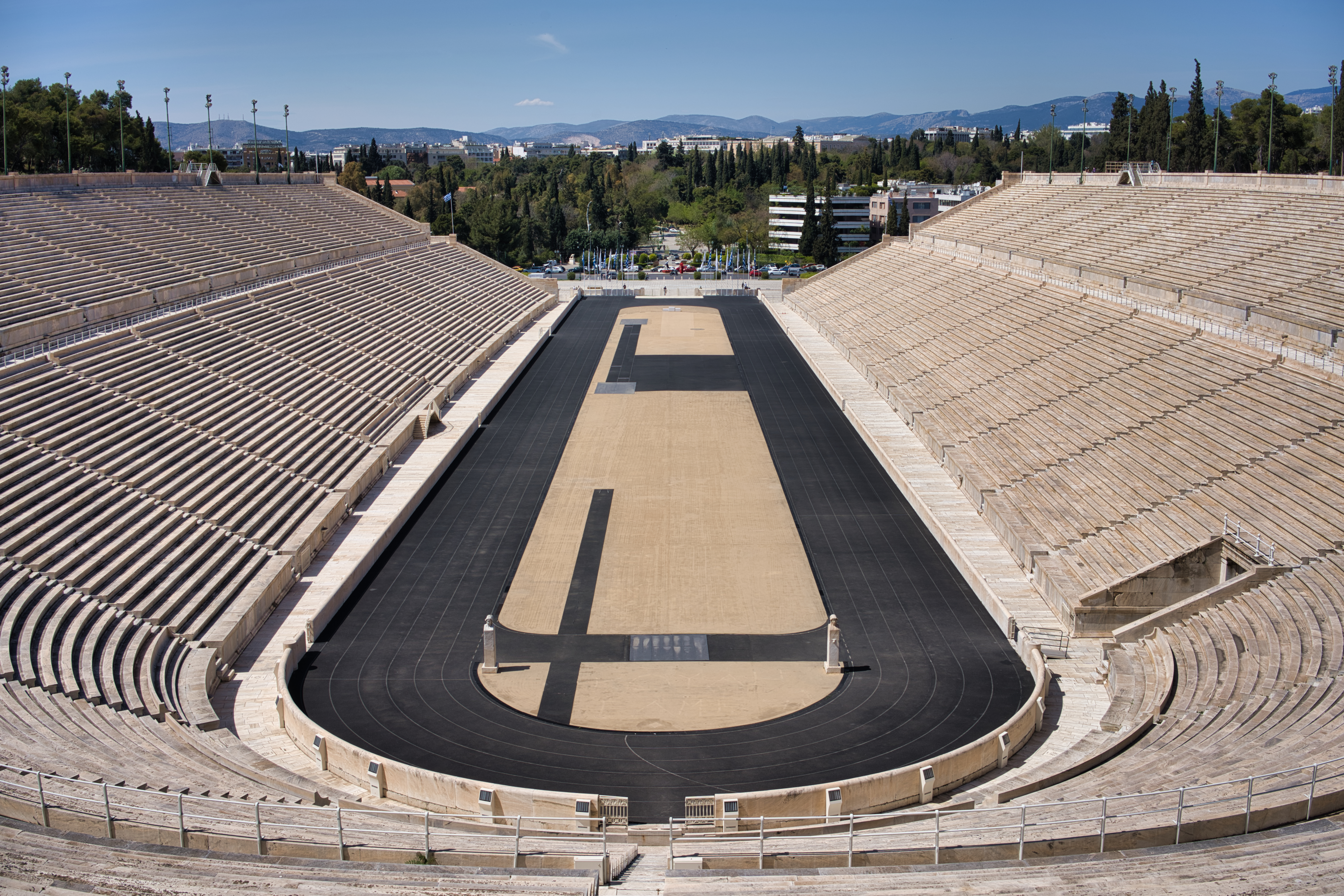

- Location within Athens municipality
- Coordinates: 37°58′09″N 23°44′26″E
- Country: Greece
- Region: Attica
- City: Athens
- Postal code: 116 35, 116 36
- Area code: 210
- Website: www.cityofathens.gr

Kallimarmaro (Greek: Καλλιμάρμαρο pronounced [kaliˈmaɾmaɾo] meaning ‘made of beautiful marble’) is a small neighborhood of Athens, Greece, named after the Panathenaic Stadium. It is located within Pangrati.
