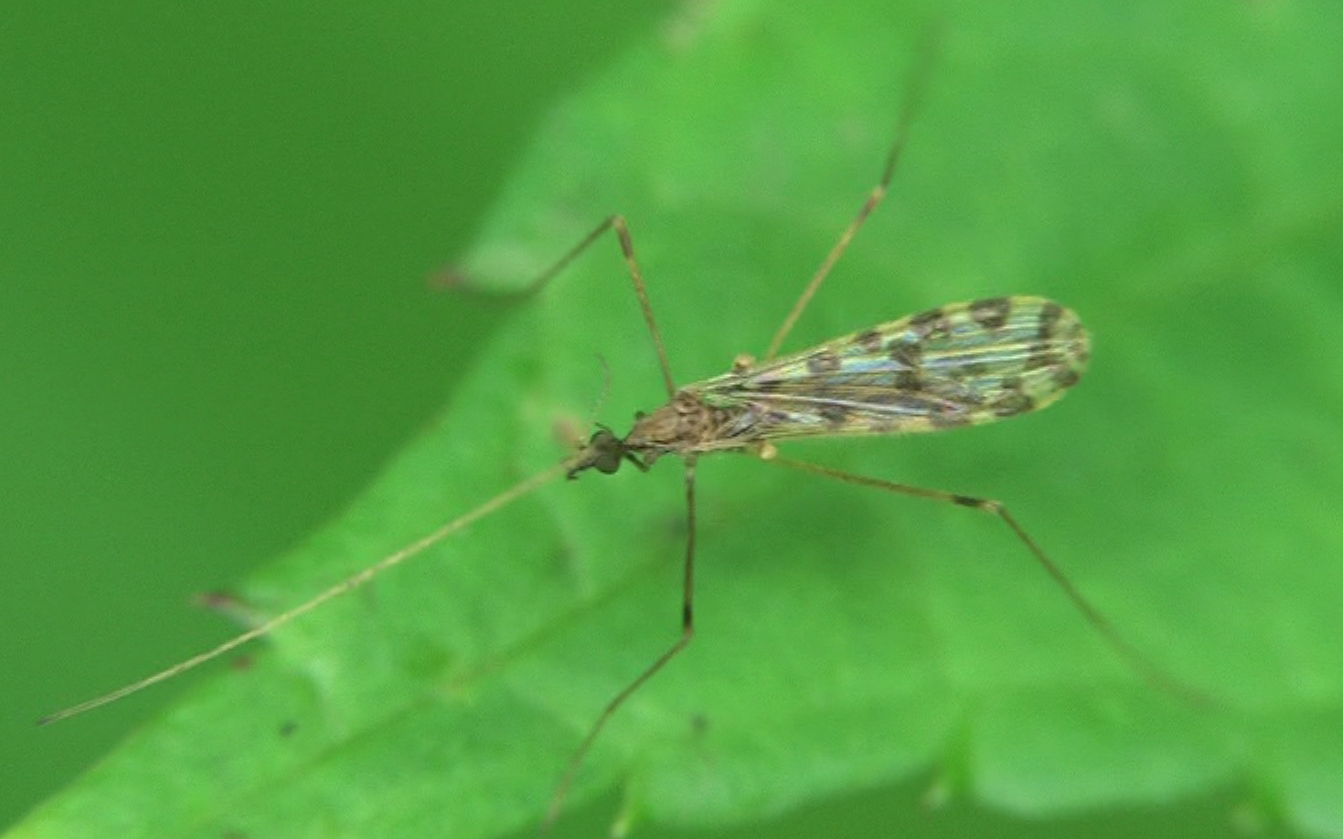
- Ilisia maculata

Scientific classification
- Kingdom: Animalia
- Phylum: Arthropoda
- Class: Insecta
- Order: Diptera
- Family: Limoniidae
- Subfamily: Chioneinae
- Genus: Ilisia; Rondani, 1856

Type species
- Erioptera maculata Meigen, 1804

Species
- see text

Synonyms
- Trichosticha Schiner, 1863; Acyphona Osten Sacken, 1869

= Ilisia =

Genus of flies

Ilisia is a genus of crane fly in the family Limoniidae.

== Distribution ==
Palaearctic, North America & Oriental.

== Species ==
- I. armillaris (Osten Sacken, 1869)
- I. asymmetrica (Alexander, 1913)
- I. graphica (Osten Sacken, 1860)
- I. incongruens (Alexander, 1913)
- I. indianensis (Alexander, 1922)
- I. inermis Mendl, 1979
- I. maculata (Meigen, 1804)
- I. occoecata Edwards, 1936
- I. parchomenkoi Savchenko, 1974
- I. tenuisentis (Alexander, 1930)
- I. venusta (Osten Sacken, 1860)

== Images ==
I. maculata on Small Balsam
