= Omonoia, Athens =

Omonoia Ομόνοια
- Neighborhood
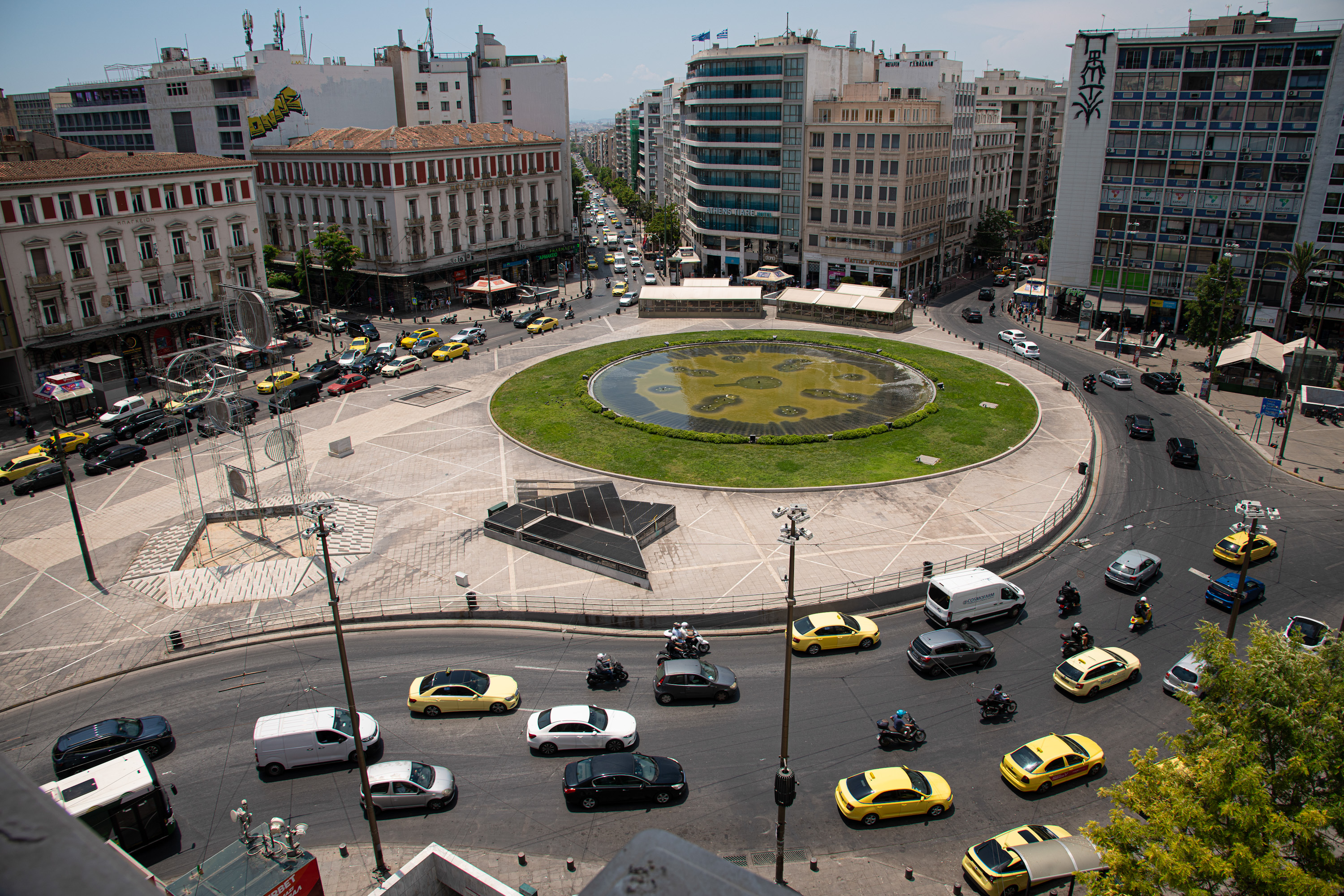
- Omonoia Square, the center of the Omonoia neighborhood

- Location within Athens municipality
- Coordinates: 37°59′2″N 23°43′40″E
- Country: Greece
- Region: Attica
- City: Athens
- Postal code: 104 xx, 105 xx
- Website: www.cityofathens.gr

Omonoia (Greek: Ομόνοια pronounced [oˈmo.ni.a]) is a neighborhood in downtown Athens, Greece, centered on the square of the same name and served by the Omonoia station of the Athens Metro. Historically the heart of the city, it has experienced serious urban decay in recent years, becoming plagued by drug dealing, prostitution and theft, especially in its western part. Despite that, it is still a focal point for commercial and social life in Athens.
