= Nea Filothei =

Nea Filothei Νέα Φιλοθέη
- Neighborhood
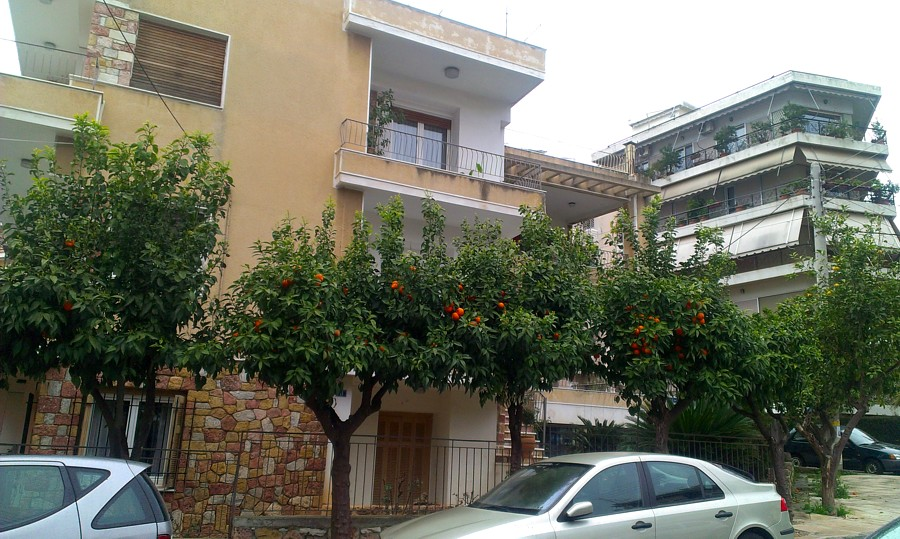
- Houses in Nea Filothei

- Location within Athens municipality
- Country: Greece
- Region: Attica
- City: Athens
- Postal code: 115 24
- Area code: 210
- Website: www.cityofathens.gr

Nea Filothei (Greek: Νέα Φιλοθέη pronounced [ˈnea filoˈθei]) is a neighborhood of Athens, Greece.

The area is named for St Filothei who was active in the area.
