= Ellinoroson =

Ellinoroson Ελληνορώσων
- Neighborhood
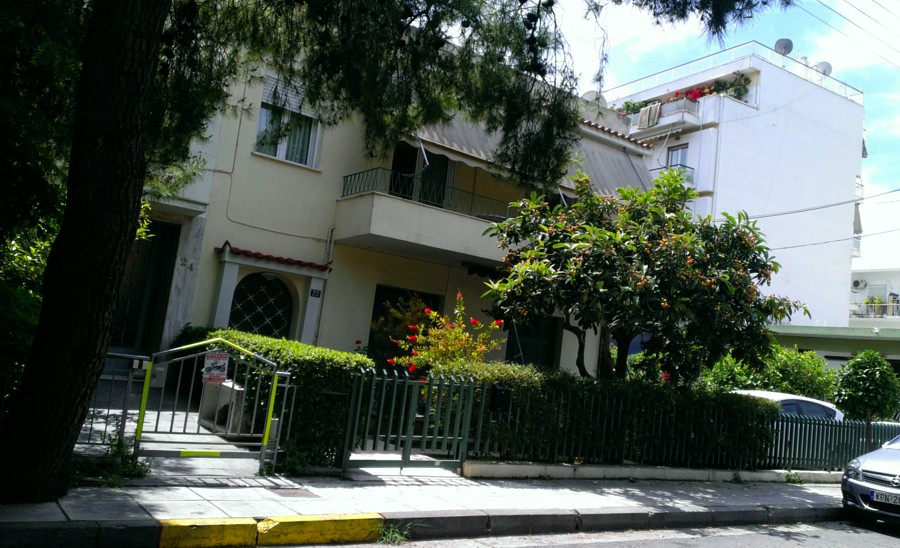
- Houses in Ellinoroson

- Location within municipality of Athens
- Coordinates: 37°59′51″N 23°46′28″E
- Country: Greece
- Region: Attica
- City: Athens
- Postal code: 115 25, 115 26
- Area code: 210
- Website: www.cityofathens.gr

Ellinoroson (Greek: Ελληνορώσων pronounced [e.li.noˈɾo.son]), literally 'of the Greek-Russians', is a suburb of Athens, Greece. As its name suggests, the area was first inhabited by Greeks fleeing from Russia.

The Katechaki metro station serves Line 3 of the Athens Metro.
