= Girokomeio, Athens =

Girokomeio Γηροκομείο
- Neighborhood
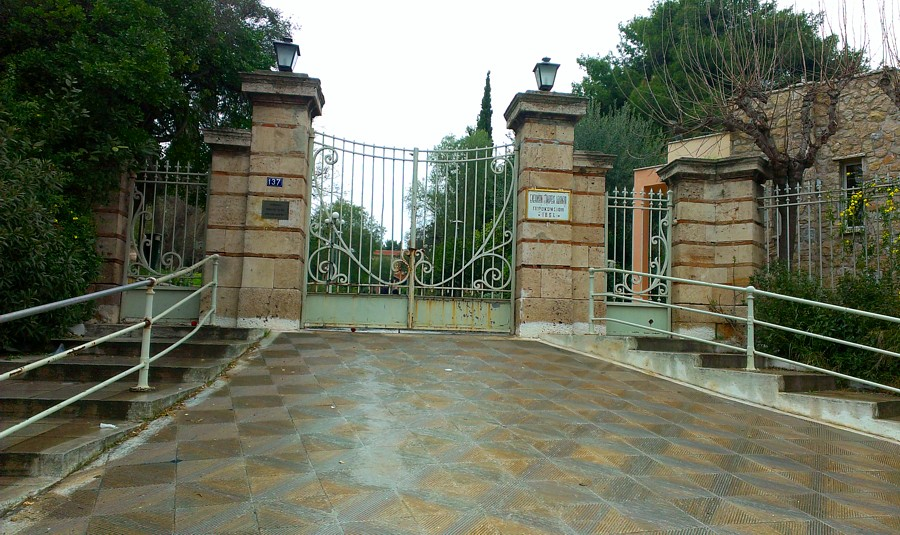
- Nursing home for which the area was named

- Location within Athens
- Coordinates: 37°59′49″N 23°45′54″E
- Country: Greece
- Region: Attica
- City: Athens
- Postal code: 115 24
- Area code: 210
- Website: www.cityofathens.gr

Girokomeio or Girokomio (Greek: Γηροκομείο pronounced [ʝiɾokoˈmio]), meaning 'nursing home' is a neighborhood of Athens, Greece.

It is named after a large old people's nursing home in the area.

== Transport ==
Panormou metro station on Line 3 of the Athens Metro is the closest station.
