= Agios Panteleimonas, Athens =

Agios Panteleimonas Άγιος Παντελεήμονας
- Neighborhood
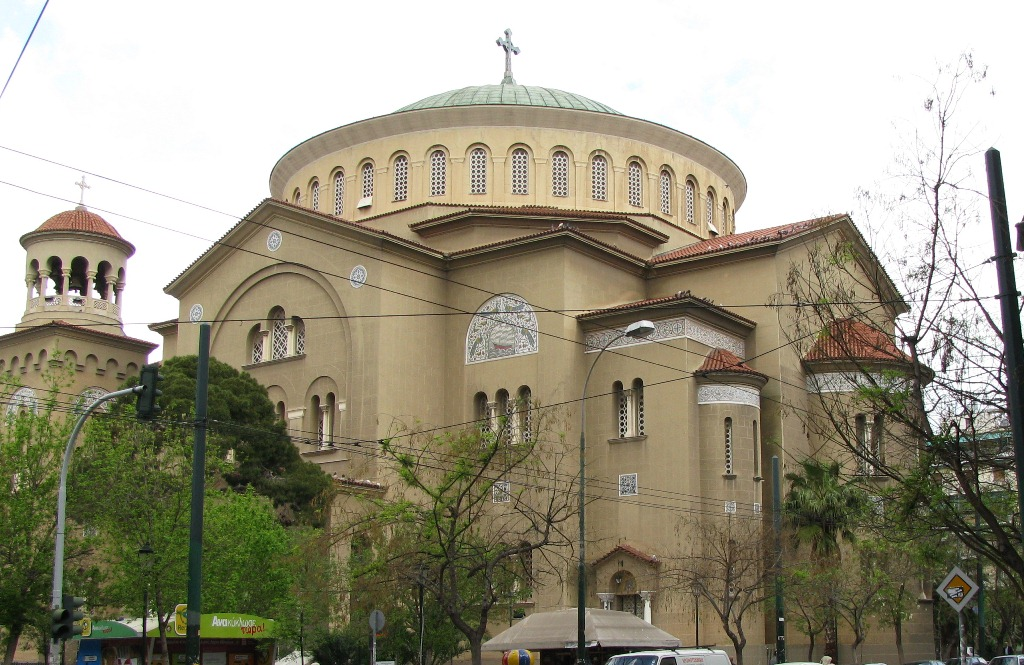
- The cathedral of Agios Panteleimonas

- Location within municipality of Athens
- Coordinates: 37°59′44″N 23°43′32″E
- Country: Greece
- Region: Attica
- City: Athens
- Postal code: 104 40, 104 46, 112 51
- Area code: 210
- Website: www.cityofathens.gr

Agios Panteleimonas or Aghios Panteleimonas (Greek: Άγιος Παντελεήμονας pronounced [ˈa.ʝos pan.de.leˈi.mo.nas]) is a neighbourhood of Athens, located northwest of the centre of Athens between Viktoria Square and Attikis Square. The district's main street is Acharnon Avenue. The neighborhood owes its name to the prominent church of Agios Panteleimonas (Saint Pantaleon), built in this area during the interwar period.

== The church ==
Agios Panteleimonas, often referred to as Agios Panteleimonas Acharnon because is located along Acharnon Avenue, is one of the biggest churches in Balkans. Its erection started in 1920s and was one of the first buildings built by concrete. At first, only the foundations and the big cupola were built. For a while the works stopped and continued after the second World War. The temple finally completed during 1970s.

== Tensions ==
During the late 2000s, many immigrants from countries of Middle East and Africa settled in Agios Panteleimonas. The rapid increase in immigrants without permanent housing and work in the district brought about an increase of delinquency. The gradual ghettoisation of the area has resulted in a negative reaction by residents and the increase in support of far-right organisations.

== Sports ==
Agios Panteleimonas hosts the basketball club Aetos B.C. with current presence in A2 Ethniki basketball (second division).
