= Rizoupoli =

Rizoupoli Ριζούπολη
- Neighborhood
- Location within Athens municipality
- Coordinates: 38°1′49″N 23°44′33″E
- Country: Greece
- Region: Attica
- City: Athens
- Postal code: 111 42, 111 43, 111 44, 111 46
- Area code: 210
- Website: www.cityofathens.gr

Rizoupoli (Greek: Ριζούπολη pronounced [ɾiˈzu.po.li]) is a neighborhood of Athens, Greece. It is the northernmost neighborhood of Athens along with the small district Probonas. The district is located between Patissia, another Athenian neighborhood, and nearby town of Nea Filadelfeia and is home to the Georgios Kamaras Stadium.

== History ==
Rizoupoli is named after Ioannis Rizopoulos, a businessman and land developer of the early 20th century. Rizopoulos's historic mansion stood in the area until 2002, when the Greek government agreed for its demolition. After the Asia Minor Catastrophe many refugees from Ionia and other places of Asia Minor settled in Rizoupoli. In 1948, the football stadium of Rizoupoli was built and became the home stadium of Apollon Smyrnis, a historic club founded in Smyrni in 1891.

== Places of interest ==
A big cave with an area of 2,500 m^{2} is located in Rizoupoli. It is called Profitis Ilias. In the interior the cave, remains dating from the stone age (5.000 B.C.) have been found.
