= Rouf, Athens =

Rouf Ρουφ
- Neighborhood
- Location within Athens
- Coordinates: 37°58′25″N 23°42′13″E
- Country: Greece
- Region: Attica
- City: Athens
- Postal code: 118 54, 177 78
- Area code: 210
- Website: www.cityofathens.gr

Rouf (Greek: Ρουφ pronounced [ˈɾuf]) is a neighborhood of Athens, Greece. It is located to the west of the Athens centre, between Piraeus and Petrou Ralli Avenue. Rouf is named after a Bavarian businessman who, during Otto's reign, bought large areas in this location to make a farm. When the railway passed through this area, the local station was named Rouf. During the interwar period, a camp was built in Rouf. In 1947, the local team of Rouf was founded under the name Asteras Rouf and later renamed to PAO Rouf.
