= Kolonos =

Kolonos Κολωνός
- Neighborhood
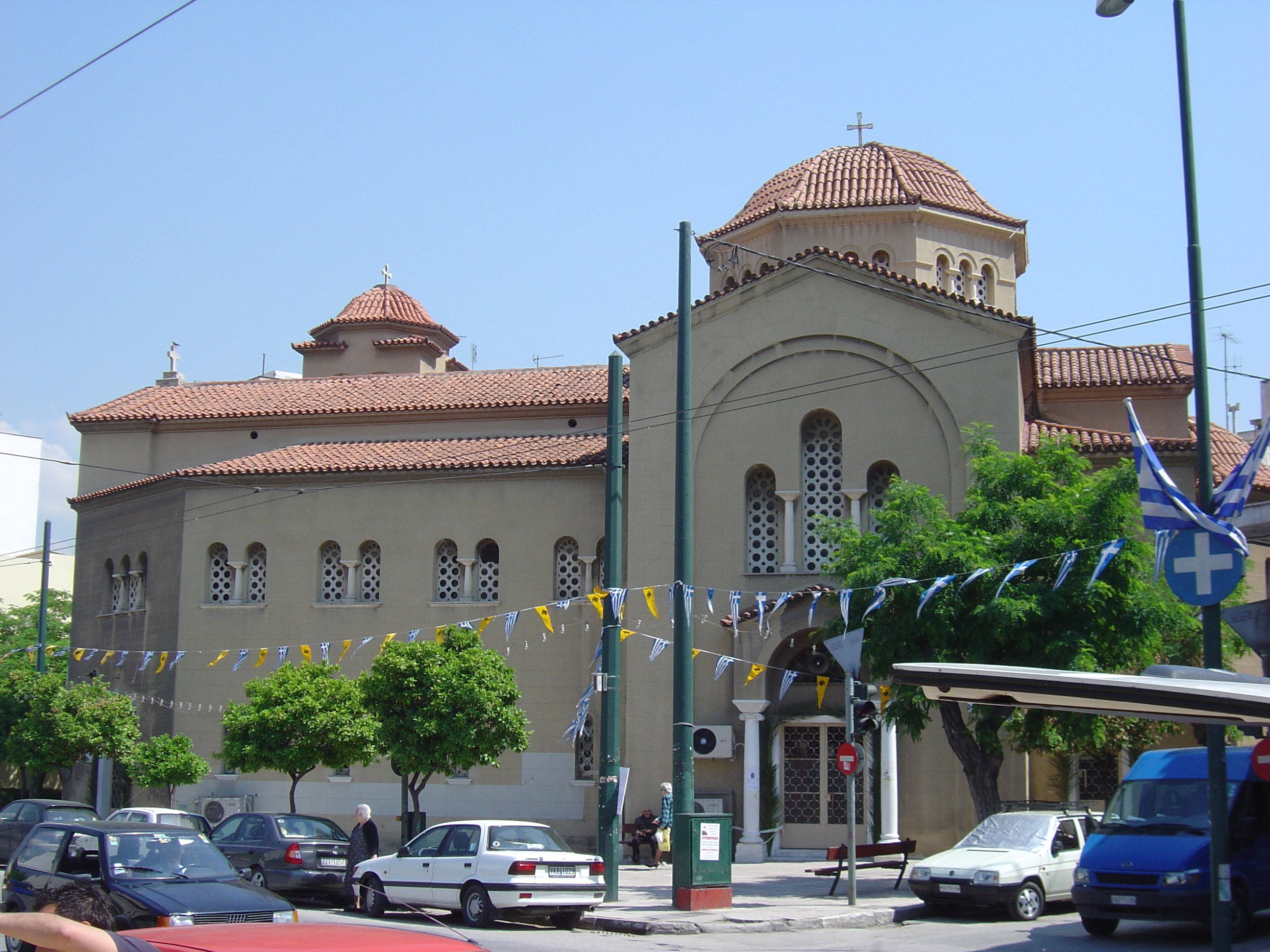

- Location within Athens municipality
- Coordinates: 37°59′45″N 23°42′55″E
- Country: Greece
- Region: Attica
- City: Athens
- Postal code: 104 44
- Area code: 210
- Website: www.cityofathens.gr

Kolonos (Greek: Κολωνός, pronounced [ko.loˈnos]) is a densely populated working-class district of Athens. It is named after the ancient deme, Hippeios Colonus.

The district hosts a multi-year football club, Attikos F.C., that was founded in 1919.

== History ==
Kolonos is the site of ancient Colonus, a deme of ancient Attica.
