= Public transport in Athens =

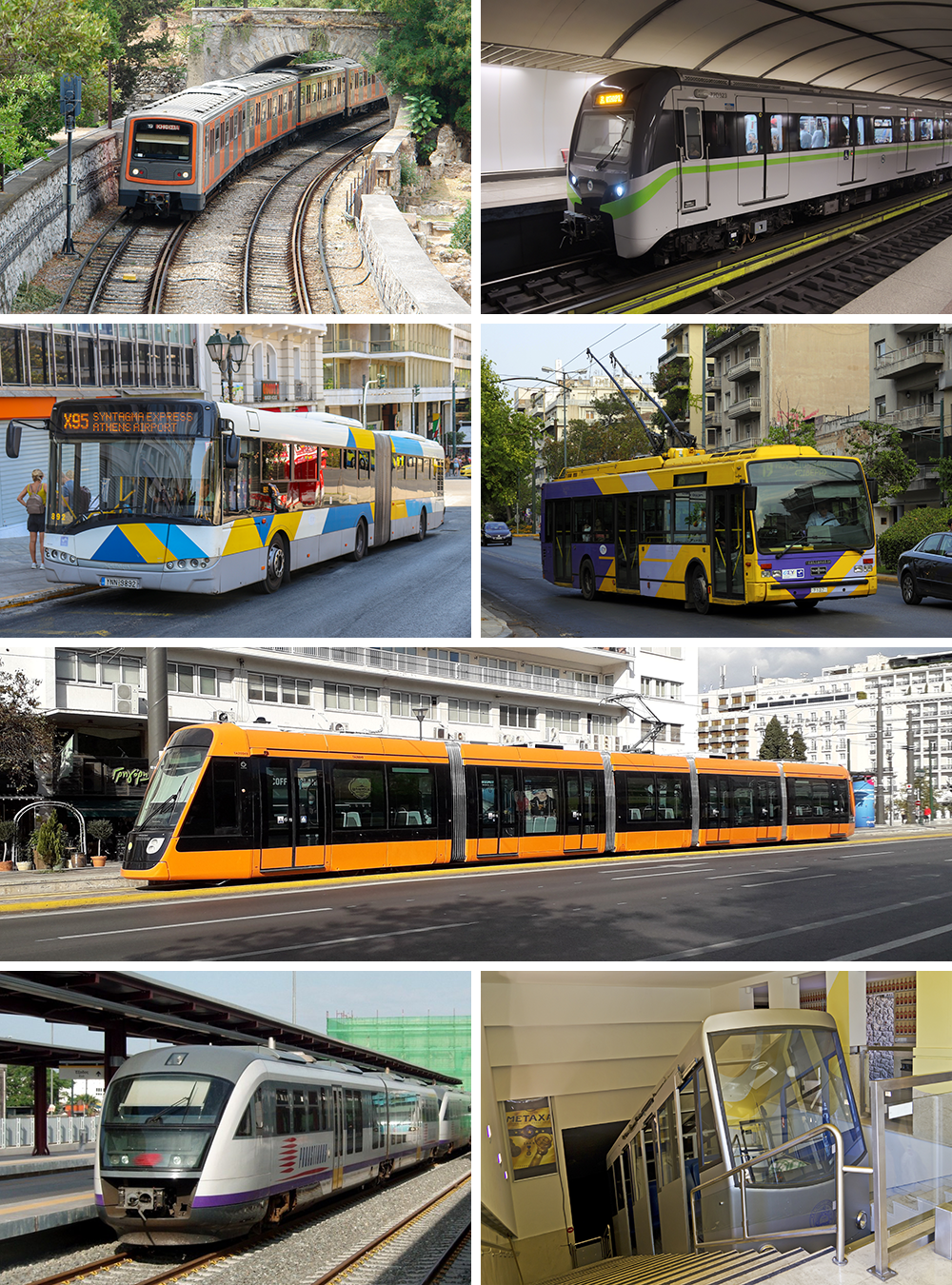
Top to bottom: metro train (sub-surface and deep level); bus; trolleybus; tram; suburban train; and the funicular

Public transport in Athens comprises a bus network, various rail systems, funiculars, and maritime services to serve the more than 4 million inhabitants of the city spread over an area of 2,928 km^{2} (1,131 sq mi).

== Rail transport ==
=== Metro ===
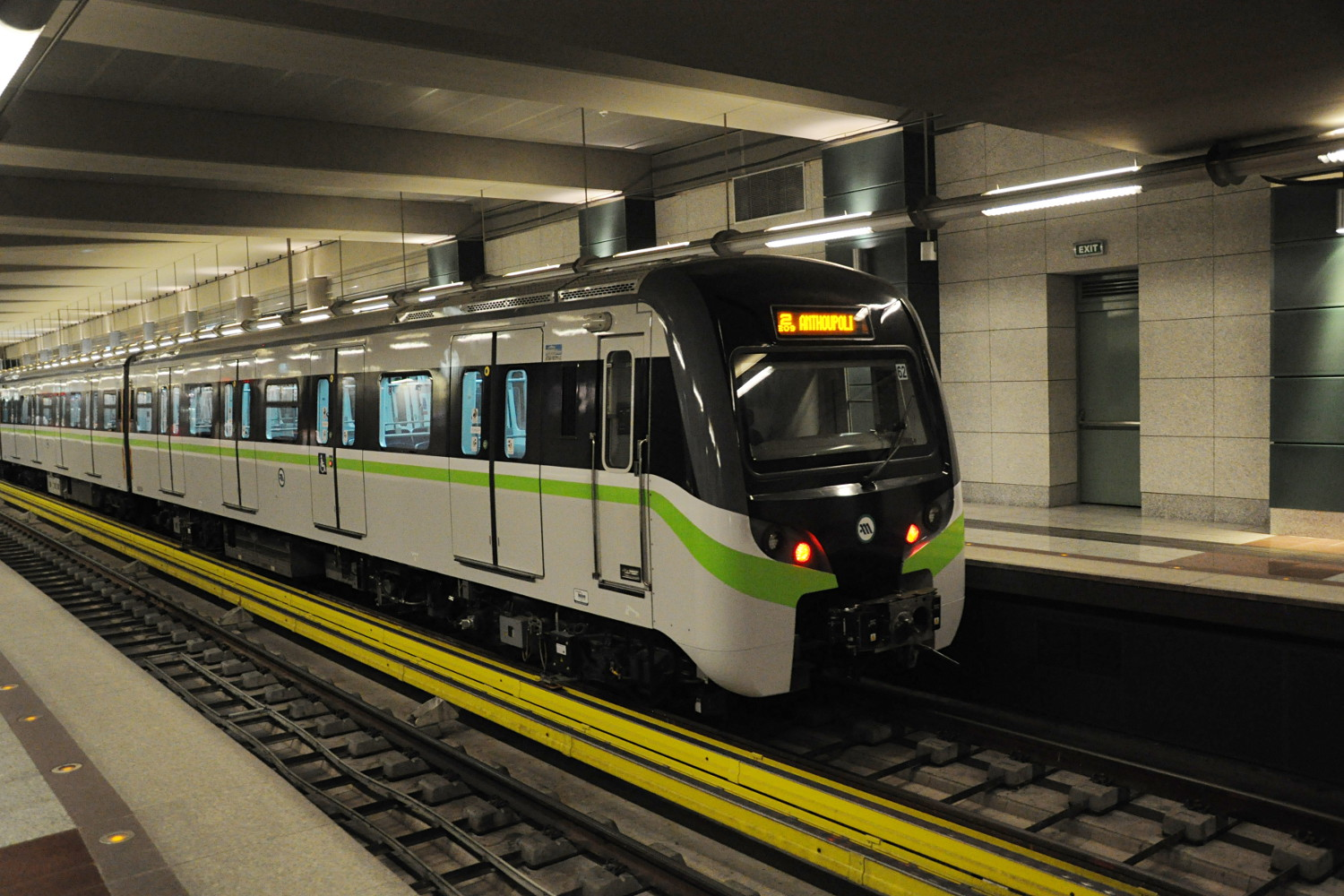
Athens Metro subway train (3rd generation stock) at Anthoupoli station

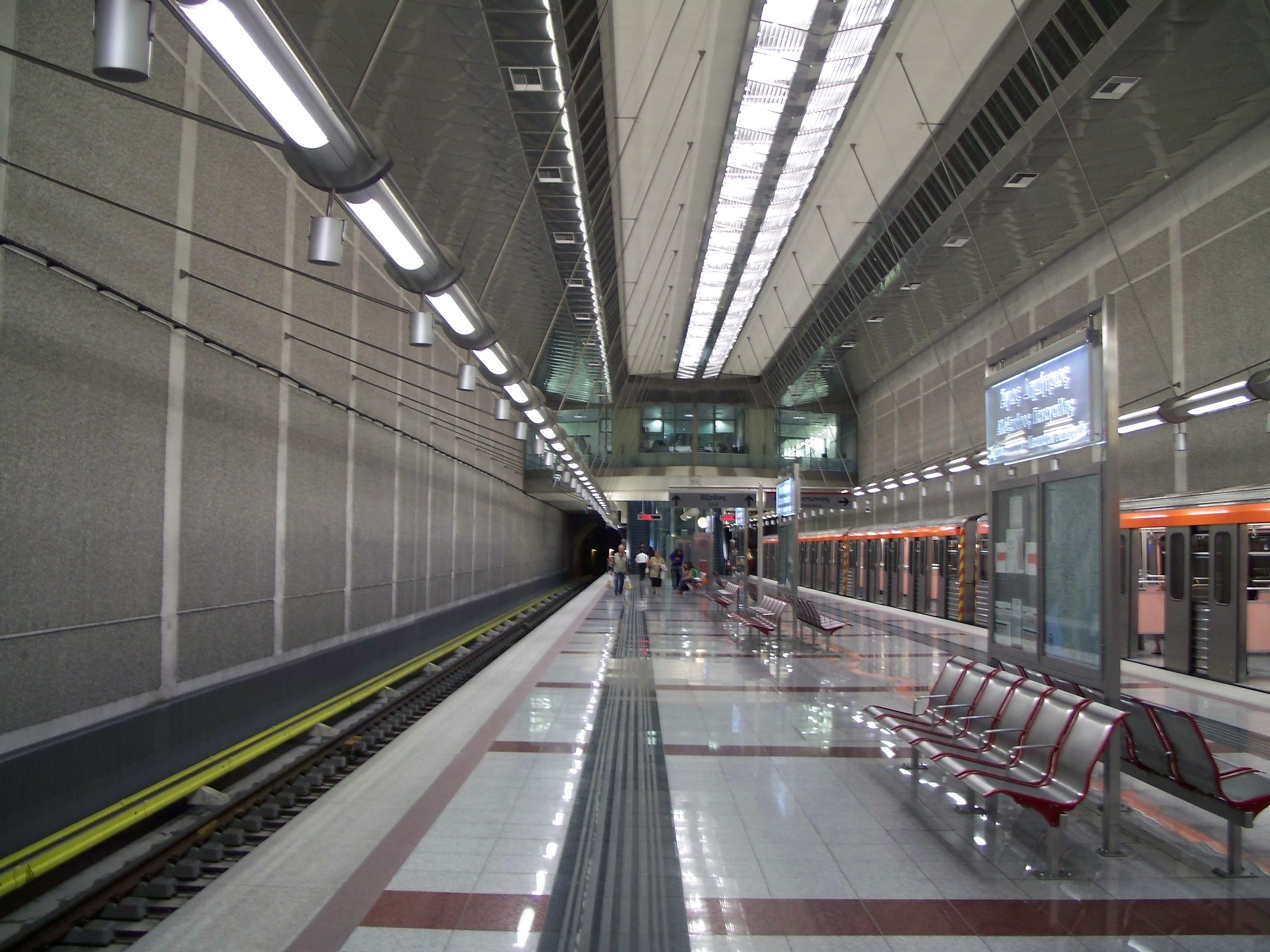
Agios Dimitrios station with an island platform

The Athens Metro is operated by Stasy S.A (Statheres Sygkoinonies S.A) which is a subsidiary company of OASA (Athens urban transport organisation) and provides public transport throughout the Athens Urban Area. While its main purpose is transport, it also houses Greek artifacts found during construction of the system. The Athens Metro has an operating staff of 387 and runs three metro lines; namely the Line 1 (Green), Line 2 (Red) and line 3 (Blue) lines, of which the first was constructed in 1869, and the other two largely during the 1990s, with the initial sections opened in January 2000. The line 1 for the most part runs at ground level and the other two (lines 2,3) routes run entirely underground (except the Doukisis Plakentias-Airport section) and a fleet of 42 trains consisting of 252 cars operate within the network, with a daily occupancy of 1,353,000 passengers.

==== Line 1 ====
Line 1 (the Green Line) serves 24 stations, and forms the oldest line of the Athens metro network. Runs from Piraeus station to Kifissia station and covers a distance of 25.6-kilometre (15.9 mi). There are also transfer connections with the Blue (line 3) at Monastiraki and Piraeus station and with Red (line 2) at Omonia and Attiki stations.

==== Line 2 ====
Line 2 (the Red Line) runs from Anthoupoli station to Elliniko station with a total number of stations being 20 and covers a distance of 17.5 km (10.9 mi).[116] The line connects the western suburbs of Athens with the southeast suburbs, passing through the center of Athens. The Red line has transfer connections with the Green (line 1) at Attiki and Omonia Square stations. There are also transfer connections with the Blue (line 3) at the Syntagma Square station and with the Tram at Syntagma Square, Syngrou-Fix station and Neos Kosmos station. There is a planned expansion of this line from Anthoupoli to Ilion, and the estimated completion date is 2028.

==== Line 3 ====
Line 3 (the Blue Line) runs from the western suburbs, namely the Dimotiko Theatro metro station, through the central Monastiraki and Syntagma stations to Doukissis Plakentias avenue in the northeastern suburb of Halandri, covering a distance of 23 stations and 16 km (10 mi), then ascending to ground level and reaching Eleftherios Venizelos International Airport with a total of 27 stations, using the Suburban Railway infrastructure and extending its length to 39 km (24 mi). The spring 2007 extension from Monastiraki westwards, to Egaleo, connected some of the main night life hubs of the city, namely the ones of Gazi (Kerameikos station) with Psirri (Monastiraki station) and the city centre (Syntagma station). The line extension westwards towards Piraeus was completed in 2022.

==== Line 2 & 3 track replacement works and 5G installation ====
The tracks of these aging metro lines have never been replaced since their openings over 25 years ago. 32 km of tracks across the two lines are undergoing replacement efforts, with expected completion in late 2026. Alongside track replacement works, 5G network installation in some stations have also been started. During these works, affected stations will close earlier, usually Sunday to Thursday around 21:40 EEST/EET depending on the exact station. Passenger informations of line closures will also be displayed at the majority of STASY stations as well as within buses and some bus stops before and during the works. Some of these bus replacement services bring alongside new temporary stops.

Here are the sections that are being affected.

Affected line	Stations affected	Time frame	Replacement bus	Reason
2	Elliniko, Argyroupoli, Alimos, and Ilioupoli	4 May 2025 - 8 May 2025	X12	5G installation
2	Neos Kosmos, Ag. Ioannis, and Dafni	11 Nov 2025 - 12 Dec 2025	X13	Track replacement and 5G installation
2	Syngrou Fix, Neos Kosmos, and Agios Ioannis	11 Jan 2026 - 30 Jan 2026	X10	Track replacement and 5G installation
2	Syntagma, Acropolis, Syngrou-Fix, and Neos Kosmos	8 Feb 2026 - 12 Mar 2026	X15	Track replacement and 5G installation
2	Omonoia, Panepistimio, Syntagma, and Acropolis	15 Mar 2026 - 23 Mar 2026	X16	Track replacement and 5G installation
2	Omonoia, and Panepistimio	24 Mar 2026 - 26 Mar 2026, 29 Mar 2026 - 2 Apr 2026	X17	Track replacement and 5G installation
2	Attiki, Larissa Station, Metaxourgeio, Omonia, and Panepistimio	21 Apr 2026 - 23 Apr 2026, 26 Apr 2026 - 30 Apr 2026	X18	Track replacement and 5G installation
2	Attiki, Larissa Station, and Metaxourgeio	5 May 2026 - 25 June 2026 (completed on 11 June ahead of schedule)	X19	Track replacement and 5G installation
3	Panormou, Katehaki, Ethniki Amyna, Holargos, and Nomismatokopeio	14 June 2026 - 2 July 2026 (completed on 28 June ahead of schedule), 11 October 2026 - 15 October 2026, 18 October 2026 - 22 October 2026	X20	Track replacement and 5G installation
3	Megaro Moussikis, Ambelokipi, Panormou, and Katehaki	28 June 2026 - 13 July 2026	X21	Track replacement and 5G installation
3	Evangelismos, Megaro Moussikis, Ambelokipi, Panormou, and Katehaki	19 July 2026 - 30 July 2026 (completed on 26 Jul ahead of schedule)	X22	Track replacement and 5G installation
3	Syntagma, Evangelismos, Megaro Moussikis	26 July 2026 - 6 August 2026	X23	Track replacement and 5G installation
3	Eleonas, Keramikos, Monastiraki	7 September 2026 - 10 September 2026, 16 September 2026 - 17 September 2026, 20 September 2026 - 24 September 2026, 27 September 2026 - 1 October 2026, 4 October 2026 - 8 October 2026	X24	Track replacement and 5G installation
3	Ethniki Amyna, Holargos, Nomismatokopeio, Ag. Paraskevi, Halandri	25 October 2026 - 12 November 2026	X25	Track replacement and 5G installation

Please note that some of these replacement buses may not follow the exact path of the metro.

=== Suburban Railway (Proastiakos) ===
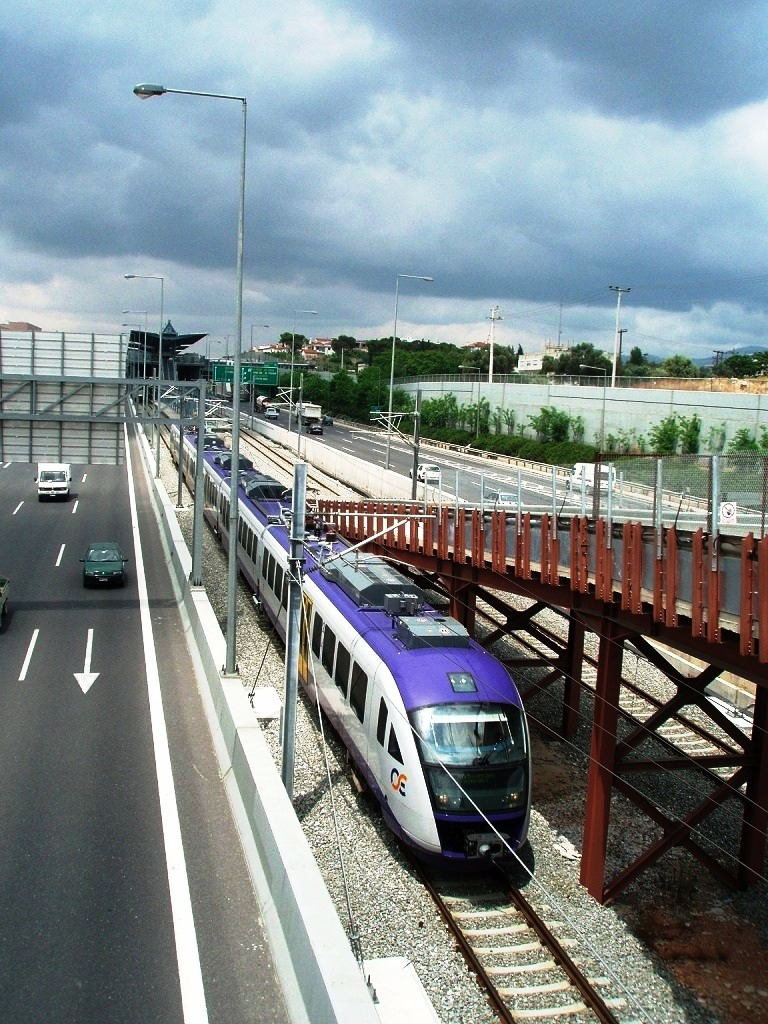
A Desiro EMU5 leaves Nerantziotissa station with suburban service 4124 to Athens International Airport

The Athens Suburban Railway, referred to as the Proastiakos, connects Eleftherios Venizelos International Airport to the city of Aigio, 170 km (106 mi) west of Athens, and Larissa station, the city's central rail station, with the port of Piraeus and Chalkida. The length of Athens's commuter rail network extends to 120 km (75 mi), and is expected to stretch to 281 km (175 mi) by 2010. The Suburban Railway will be extended to Patras.

=== Tram ===
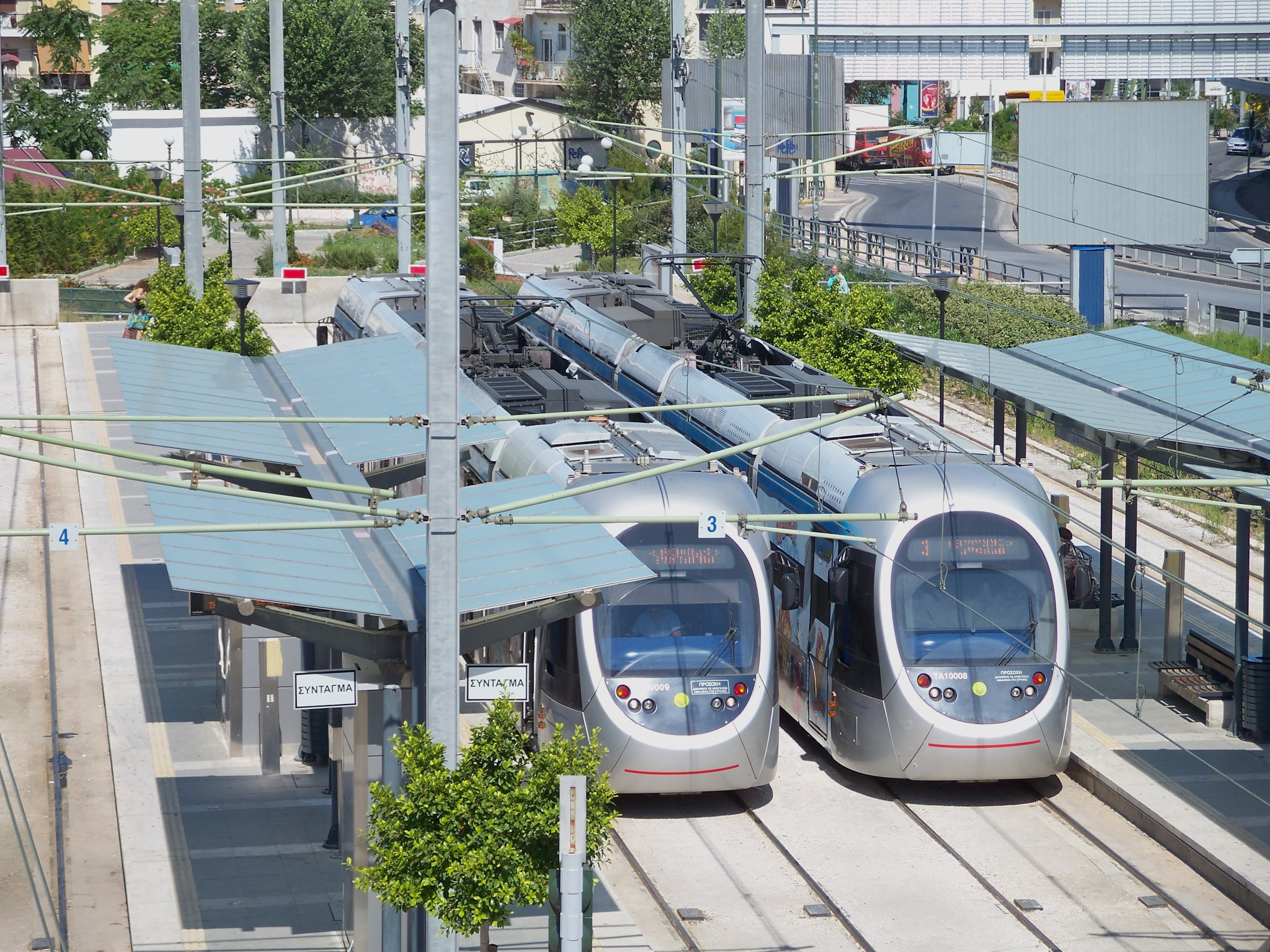
A modern Athens Tram station and vehicles

Stasy operates a fleet of 60 vehicles, 35 'Ansaldobreda Sirio' and 25 'Alstom Citadis 305', which serve 60 stations, employ 345 people with an average daily occupancy of 65,000 passengers. The tram network spans a total length of 27 km (17 mi) and covers ten Athenian suburbs. The network runs from Syntagma Square to the southwestern suburb of Pireus, where the line splits in two branches; the first runs along the coastline toward the southern suburb of Voula, while the other heads towards the port of Piraeus. The network covers the majority of the Athens coastline. There are plans to extend the tram network into the Ellinikon development area.

=== Railways and ferry connections ===
Athens is the hub of the country's national railway system (OSE), connecting the capital with major cities across Greece and abroad (Istanbul, Sofia and Bucharest). Due to low demand and financial difficulties, all international rail services were suspended indefinitely in 2011. The Port of Piraeus connects Athens to the numerous Greek islands of the Aegean Sea, with ferries departing, while also serving the cruise ships that arrive.

== Road transport ==
=== Bus transport ===
OSY (Greek: ΟΣΥ) (Odikes SYgkinonies), or Road Transport, is the main operator of the bus network in Athens. It was created in 2011 after the merger of ETHEL and ILPAP, the two previous bus operators in Athens. As of 2017, its network consists of about 322 bus lines which span the Athens Metropolitan Area. As of 2020 has an operating staff of 4,669, and a fleet of 1,897 buses. Of those 1,897 buses, 301 run on compressed natural gas and 286 are electric buses (trolleybuses). All of the 286 trolleybuses are equipped to enable them to run on diesel in case of power failure.

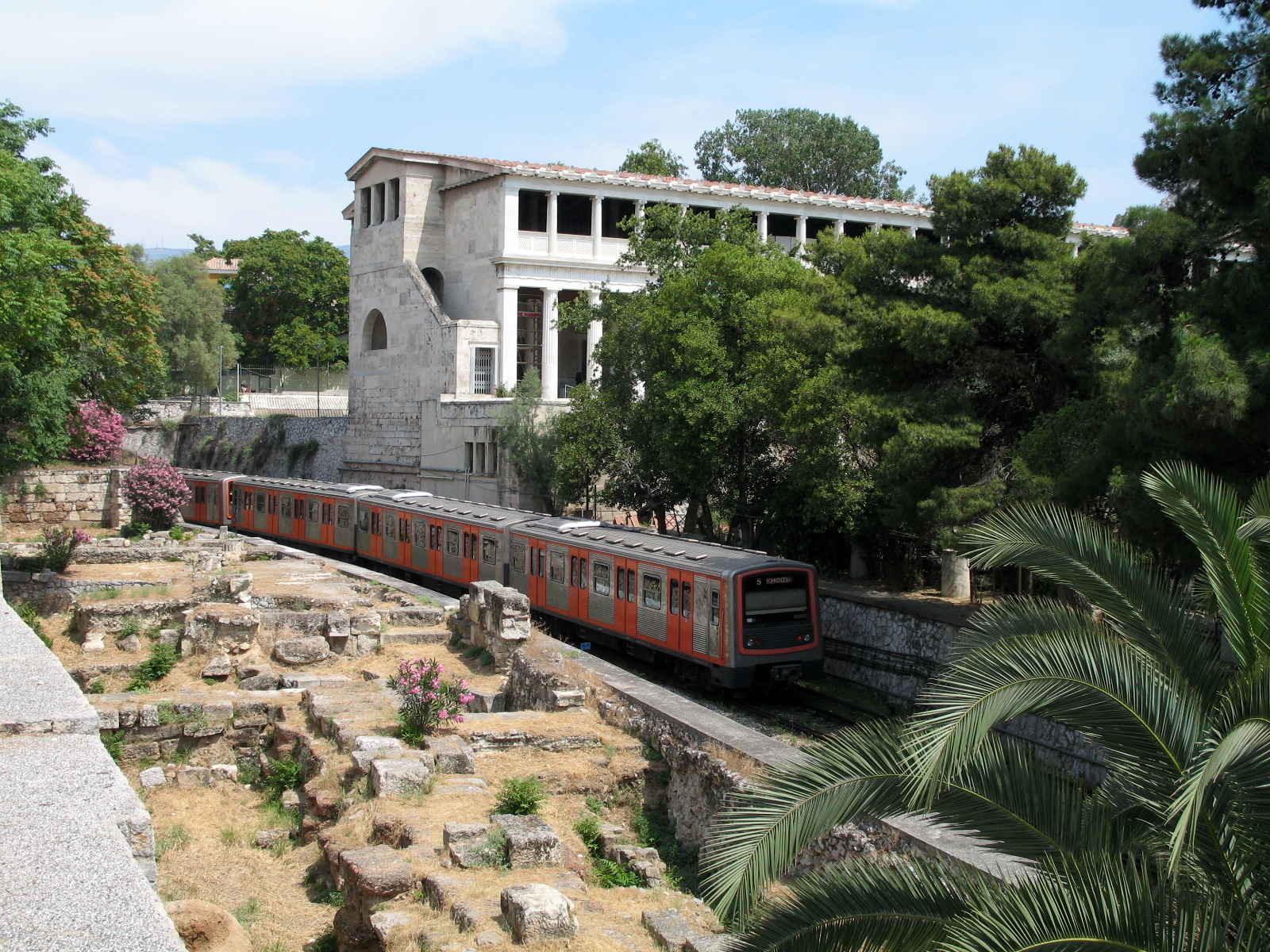
A Line 1 (Green Line) train passes by the Stoa of Attalos in central Athens

Intercity and regional bus links are provided by KTEL from two InterCity Bus Terminals, Kifissos Bus Terminal A and Liosion Bus Terminal B, both located in the center-western part of the city. International bus links are provided by various private transport companies.

The daytime bus network in the city run between the hours of 05:00 – 00:00 generally. OSY has two bus routes which operate on a 24-hour basis; the 11 and 040. Most routes depart on a 30-60 minute frequency Mon-Sun. It also runs three intermunicipal night lines (which operate after midnight); X14, 400, 500 and 790. The Athens Transport Authority also operates four 24-hour express bus-lines from Athens International Airport to different parts of the city. The X95 links to the city centre, the X93 links to Kifissos and Liosion bus stations, the X96 links to the Port of Piraeus and the X97 links to Elliniko metro station. As of 2021 the fare on these services was 5.50 euro per person.

==== Bus depots in Athens ====
There are 8 bus depots in the Athens greater area.

Depot	Area	Coordinates	Notes
Acharnes	Acharnes	38°06′14″N 23°45′29″E	Opened in 2020. Originally operated by KTEL Korinthias, now operated by Κοινοπραξια Συγκοινωνιων Αττικης
Agios Dimitrios	Agios Dimitrios	37°55′56″N 23°43′04″E	
Ano Liosia	Ano Liosia	38°05′39″N 23°41′41″E	
Anthousa	Anthousa	38°00′41″N 23°52′11″E	
Attiki	Attiki	37°59′51″N 23°43′22″E	Originally trolleybus depot. Also used for buses since 2024.
Elliniko	Elliniko	37°54′01″N 23°44′29″E	The depot was closed in 2018
Gazi	Kerameikos	37°58′42″N 23°42′58″E	Trolleybus depot. Closed in 2014
Koropi	Koropi	37°52′52″N 23°52′48″E	Opened in 2024. Operated by Κοινοπραξια Συγκοινωνιων Αττικης
Nea Filadelfeia	Nea Filadelfeia	38°03′17″N 23°44′34″E	Trolleybus depot
Neo Faliro	Piraeus	37°56′42″N 23°39′37″E	Trolleybus depot.
Petrou Ralli	Rouf	37°58′36″N 23°41′25″E	
Rentis	Agios Ioannis Rentis	37°58′15″N 23°40′10″E	
Rouf	Rouf	37°58′43″N 23°41′26″E	Trolleybus depot. Built in 2011. Also used for buses since 2025
Votanikos	Votanikos	37°58′49″N 23°42′17″E	

==== Athens bus fleet ====
===== New buses =====
Bus model	Number	Entered service	Retired	License plates	Depot(s)	Type	Country	Door configuration	Picture
MΑΝ Lion's City 12C (Note: Leased for 10 years.)	50	26 Oct 2025	Active	ZNO 5948-ZNO 5997	Rentis; Votanikos	Single-decker	Germany	2-2-2	
MΑΝ Lion's City 18C	100	Jul 2025	Active	ZNO 6901-ZNO 6995; ZNO 6997-ZNO 6999; ZNO 8994; ZNO 8999	Petrou Ralli	Single-decker articulated	Germany	2-2-2-0	
Mercedes-Benz Citaro C2	50	Jul 2025	Active	XPB 5001-XPB 5050	Votanikos	Single-decker	Germany	2-2-2	
Menarini Citymood 12 CNG	200	19 Jun 2025	Active		Ano Liosia; Anthousa	Single-decker natural gas	Italy	2-2-2	
Mercedes-Benz Citaro C2 (Note: Operated by the Consortium of Public Transport in Attica.)	50	Apr 2025	Active	ZNO 8891-ZNO 8939	Acharnes	Single-decker	Germany	2-2-2	
Iveco Urbanway 18 CNG	100	26 Feb 2025	Active	ZNM 3950-ZNM 3999; ZNO 9931-ZNO 9980	Anthousa	Single-decker natural gas articulated	France	2-2-2-2	
Yutong E9A	100	3 Feb 2025	Active	ΧΡΑ 6001-ΧΡΑ 6100	Attiki; Agios Dimitrios; Rentis; Votanikos	Single-decker electric midibus	China	1-2	
Temsa MD9	8	Dec 2024	Active	ZNΜ 3931-ZNΜ 3938	Koropi; Acharnes	Single-decker midibus	Turkey	1-2	
MΑΝ Lion's City 18C	30	26 Aug 2024	Active	ZNH 9983-ΖΝΗ 9987; ZNH 9992-ZNH 9996; ZNH 9998; ZNK 9941-ZNK 9950; ZNM 3801-ZNM 3885; ZNM 3887-ZNM 3893; ZNM 3902-ZNM 3903; ZNM 3909-ZNM 3923	Koropi	Single-decker articulated	Germany	2-2-2-0	
MΑΝ Lion's City 12C	130	26 Aug 2024	Active	ZNH 9983-ΖΝΗ 9987; ZNH 9992-ZNH 9996; ZNH 9998; ZNK 9941-ZNK 9950; ZNM 3801-ZNM 3885; ZNM 3887-ZNM 3893; ZNM 3902-ZNM 3903; ZNM 3909-ZNM 3923	Koropi; Acharnes	Single-decker	Germany	2-2-2	
Yutong E12	140 + 125	17 May 2024, Jul 2026	Active	ZNK 9801-ZNK 9940; ZNP 4158-ZNP 4197	Rentis; Agios Dimitrios; Petrou Ralli; Attiki; Anthousa; Rouf; Votanikos	Single-decker electric	China	2-2-2	
Unvi Urbis 2.5 DD	4	2011	2011	ΥΝN 9947-ΥΝN 9950	Elliniko	Double-decker	Spain	2-2	
Irisbus Citelis GNV	200	24 Jan 2011	Αctive	ΥΝP 9001-ΥΝP 9200	Ano Liosia; Anthousa	Single-decker natural gas	France	2-2-2	
Solaris Urbino ΙΙΙ 18	100	2009	Αctive	ΥΝΝ 9821-ΥΝΝ 9920	Petrou Ralli	Single-decker articulated	Poland	2-2-2-2	
Solaris Urbino ΙΙΙ 8,6	220	14 Feb 2009	Αctive	ΥΝΝ 9601-ΥΝΝ 9820	Votanikos; Elliniko; Anthousa; Rentis; Ano Liosia	Single-decker midibus	Poland	1-2	
Irisbus Agora GNV	133	2005	31 Jan 2025	ΥΝΕ 9861-ΥΝΕ 9993	Anthousa	Single-decker natural gas	France	2-2-2	
Irisbus Agora S	283	2004	Active	ZKZ 9701-ZKZ 9983	Rentis; Anthousa	Single-decker	France	2-2-2	
Neoplan N6216	91	2003	Active	8001-8091	Nea Filadelfeia	Single-decker trolleybus	Germany	2-2-2	
Neoplan N6221	51	2003	Active	9001-9051	Nea Filadelfeia	Single-decker articulated trolleybus	Germany	2-2-2-2	
ELVO C99.405N	20	2001	Active	YMI 1730-YMI 1749	Petrou Ralli; Votanikos	Single-decker	Greece	2-2-0	
Renault Agora CNG	295	2001	2020	ZZP 8701-ZZP 8995	Anthousa; Ano Liosia	Single-decker natural gas	France	2-2-2	
ELVO C97.405N	190	2000	12 Jul 2026	YMI 1540-YMI 1729	Votanikos; Petrou Ralli	Single-decker	Greece	2-2-2	
Van Hool A300T	112	1999	Active	7001-7112	Rouf; Attiki	Single-decker trolleybus	Belgium	2-2-2	
Neoplan N6014	112	1999	Active	6001-6112	Rouf; Neo Faliro; Gazi	Single-decker trolleybus	Germany	2-2-2	
ELVO C97.N4007	200	1998	7 Mar 2025	YMI 1220-YMI 1419	Votanikos; Anthousa; Rentis	Single-decker midibus	Greece	2-2	
ELVO C97.405GN	220	22 Sep 1998	Active	YMI 1000-YMI 1219	Petrou Ralli; Anthousa; Elliniko	Single-decker articulated	Greece	2-2-2-2	
Saracakis "Athina"	120	1999	17 Jul 2025	ΥΜΙ 1420-ΥΜΙ 1539	Petrou Ralli	Single-decker articulated	Greece	2-2-2-2	
ELVO C93.405N "Vergina"	53	1994	4 Jun 2009	ΥΕΜ 4709-ΥΕΜ 4745; YKP 9093-YKP 9108	Elliniko; Agios Dimitrios	Single-decker	Greece	2-2-2	
Den Oudsten Alliance City B90	71	1994	31 Dec 2010	YEM 4822-YEM 4892	Agios Dimitrios	Single-decker	Netherlands	2-2-2	
Van Hool A300	111	1994	15 Aug 2009	YEM 4893-YEM 5003	Votanikos	Single-decker	Belgium	2-2-2	
Neoplan N4016	95	1994	15 Aug 2009	YEΚ 5192-YEΚ 5210; YEΜ 4746-YEΜ 4821	Votanikos	Single-decker	Germany	2-2-2	
Mercedes-Benz O405N	299	1993	29 Dec 2023	YEH 7401-YEH 7460; YEK 5101-YEK 5191; YEK 5211-YEK 5350; YEM 4701-YEM 4708	Elliniko; Votanikos; Agios Dimitrios; Anthousa	Single-decker	Germany	2-2-2	
Van Hool A507	33	1991	29 Dec 2013	YBΡ 6801-YBP 6833	Votanikos	Single-decker minibus	Belgium	1-2	
Steyr Hellas 260.22	145	1984	2004	YAE 2301-YAE 2445	Elliniko	Single-decker	Greece	2-2-2	
Magirus-Deutz M230E120	300	1982	Circa 2000	YN 6501-YN 6700; YY 9701-YY 9800	Votanikos; Petrou Ralli	Single-decker	Germany	2-2-2	
Leyland Olympian	20	1982	1994	YAY 1805; YAY 2418-YAY 2421; YAY 2547; YAY 5262-YAY 5263; YAY 5267-YAY 5278	Votanikos	Double-decker	United Kingdom	2-2	
Saracakis SB756 "Deinosauros"	100	1981	Jul 2005	YN 6901-YN 7000	Votanikos	Single-decker articulated	Greece		
Atlas Balkancar	200	1981	1994	YN 6701-YN 6900	Elliniko; Agios Dimitrios; Ano Liosia	Single-decker	Bulgaria	2-2-2	
Ikarus 260.22	902	1978	Circa 2000	OZ 7001-OZ 7300; YZ 4101-YZ 4300; YN 6301-YN 6500; HE 2001-HE 2202	Elliniko; Votanikos; Rentis	Single-decker	Hungary	2-2-2	
ZiU-9	357	1977-1991	2004		Gazi; Attiki; Neo Faliro	Single-decker trolleybus	Soviet Union	1-2-2	ZiU_9_Athens
ZiU-683V	1	Oct 1986	2004	4001	Attiki; Rouf	Single-decker articulated trolleybus	Soviet Union	1-2-2-2	

===== Second-hand buses (2021-2025) =====
Bus model	Number	License Plates	Depot	Type	Country	Door configuration	Former operator	Picture
Mercedes-Benz Citaro LE (Note: Leased by Papadakis Bros.)	39	XEK 6001-XEK 6004; XEK 6007; XEK 6089-XEK 6092; XEK 6103-XEK 6104; XEK 6107-XEK 6108; XEK 6110-XEK 6119; XEK 6125; XEK 6128; XEK 6134; XEK 6158-XEK 6170; XZI 6849	Votanikos	Single-decker	Germany	2-2-0	Nettbuss (6104, 6107); BVG	
Mercedes-Benz Citaro LE Ü	3	XEK 6105-XEK 6106; XEK 6109	Votanikos	Single-decker	Germany	1-2-0	Nettbuss	
Mercedes-Benz Citaro	34	XEK 6006; XEK 6093-XEK 6102; XEK 6120-XEK 6124; XEK 6126-XEK 6127; XEK 6129-XEK 6133; XEK 6139-XEK 6142; XEK 6154-XEK 6155; XEK 6171-XEK 6175	Votanikos	Single-decker	Germany	2-2-0; 2-2-2	RDTA; Norgesbuss	
Mercedes-Benz Citaro G	11	XEK 6192-XEK 6196; XEK 6206-XEK 6208; XEK 6213-XEK 6215	Petrou Ralli	Single-decker articulated	Germany	1-2-2-0; 2-2-2-0	Qbuzz; TPG	
MAN A21 Lion's City	30	XEK 6005; XEK 6008-XEK 6014; XEK 6025-XEK 6029; XEK 6135-XEK 6138; XEK 6143-XEK 6153; XEK 6156-XEK 6157	Votanikos	Single-decker	Germany	2-2-0; 2-2-2	Watzinger München; OVR Waiblingen	
MAN A23 Lion's City	7	XEK 6205; XEK 6210-XEK 6212; XEK 6216-XEK 6218	Petrou Ralli	Single-decker articulated	Germany	2-2-2-0		
Solaris Urbino III 18 (Note: Leased by NBG Leasing (6015, 6020, 6022, 6185-6189, 6191, 6197-6204, 6209, 6219-6221).) (Note: Leased by Papadakis Bros (6176-6184, 6190, 6222).)	32	XEK 6015; XEK 6020; XEK 6022; XEK 6176-XEK 6191; XEK 6197-XEK 6204; XEK 6209; XEK 6219-XEK 6222	Petrou Ralli; Anthousa	Single-decker articulated	Poland	2-2-2-2; 2-2-2-0	Nettbuss; Avinor; Umove; Mobilis	
Solaris Urbino III 12 (Note: Leased by NBG Leasing.)	12	XEK 6016-XEK 6019; XEK 6021; XEK 6023; XEK 6223-XEK 6227; XEK 6293	Petrou Ralli; Anthousa	Single-decker	Poland	2-2-0; 2-2-2	MVV München; HVG; Ötztaler Verkehrsgesellschaft mbH	
Volvo 7700 (Note: Leased by Saracakis Leasing.)	53	XEK 6030-XEK 6073; XEK 6080-6088	Agios Dimitrios	Single-decker	Sweden	2-2-0; 2-2-2	Tidebuss	
Volvo 8700	6	XEK 6074-XEK 6079	Agios Dimitrios	Single-decker	Sweden	1-2-0	Nettbuss	
Irisbus Crossway LE Line	30	XEK 6228-XEK 6257	Anthousa	Single-decker	France	2-2-0	Alba-Trans; Tidebuss	
Irisbus Crossway LE City	36	XEK 6024; XEK 6258-XEK 6292	Anthousa	Single-decker	France	2-2-2	Tidebuss	

Note: XZI 6849 was an ex BVG bus bought to replace XEK 6114 which was crashed in 2023. XZI 6849 was scrapped in December 2025.

===== OSY vehicles for people with disabilities =====
OSY has a small fleet of 10 specialised vehicles for people with disabilities, offering door to door services. Disabled people eligible to use these vehicles must register themselves to OSY for free. This fleet has since been expanded from 3 to 10 vehicles in 2026, and its fleet is as follows:

Bus model	Number	Entered service	License plates	Depot(s)	Type	Picture
Iveco Daily A50	3		YNZ 5975-YNZ 5976		Minibus	
Mercedes Sprinter 417 CDI	7	2026	ZNO 5908; ZNO 5910-ZNO 5914	Rentis	Minibus	

== Athens public transportation statistics ==
The average amount of time people spend commuting with public transit in Athens, for example to and from work, on a weekday is 71 min. 16% of public transit riders, ride for more than 2 hours every day. The average amount of time people wait at a stop or station for public transit is 18 min, while 34% of riders wait for over 20 minutes on average every day. The average distance people usually ride in a single trip with public transit is 6.8 km, while 13% travel for over 12 km in a single direction.

== Midnight operations ==
In September 2025, OASA introduced 24 hour services on Saturdays aiming to boost mobility for residents and tourists at all hours. The following bus and metro lines receive 24 hour operations on Saturdays.

Route/Line	Mode of transport	Midnight frequency	Notes
2	Metro	15'	
3	Metro	15'	Services only run between Dimitiko Theatro and Doukissis Plakentias
T6	Tram	25'	
T7	Tram	25'	
550	Bus	25' - 30'	
049	Bus	30' - 35'	
221	Bus	25' - 40'	
224	Bus	35' - 55'	
421	Bus	20' - 35'	
608	Bus	30' - 35'	
703	Bus	25' - 30'	
842	Bus	25' - 35'	
A15	Bus	25' - 30'	
B11	Bus	35' - 45'	
B12	Bus	25' - 35'	

On top of those routes, there are other bus routes serving 24 hours every day, which are 040, 11, X93, X95, X96 and X97 as well as dedicated night lines including 400, 500, 790 and X14.

Planned 24 hour operations on Saturdays are also under consideration for Line 1 after refurbished trains arrive.
