= ILPAP =

Former Greek transport company

ILPAP ΗΛΠΑΠ
- Type: S.A. (corporation)
- Industry: Urban transport
- Predecessor: IEM (Greek: ΗΕΜ)
- Founded: 1970
- Defunct: 2011
- Fate: Absorbed in OSY S.A.
- Headquarters: Athens, Greece
- Area served: Athens
- Revenue: ▼€ 21.031 million (2010)
- Net income: ▲€ -59.182 million (2010)
- Owner: Greek Government
- Number of employees: 1201 (May 2011)
- Parent: OASA S.A.
- Website: http://www.athens-trolley.gr/

I.L.P.A.P. (Greek: Ηλεκτροκίνητα Λεωφορεία Περιοχής Αθηνών – Πειραιώς Η.Λ.Π.Α.Π. - Electric Buses of Athens & Piraeus Area) was a public Greek company, part of the Athens Urban Transport Organisation, responsible for the operation of the trolleybuses network. ILPAP was founded on December 14, 1970, and since 1998 the company was owned by the Athens Urban Transport Organisation (Organismos Astikon Syngoinonion Athinon - OASA, Greek: Οργανισμός Αστικών Συγκοινωνιών Αθηνών - Ο.Α.Σ.Α.), a public company.

== Overview ==
In March 2011, the Greek Government passed Law 3920 to merge ILPAP with the bus company ETHEL S.A. The resulting company is named "OSY S.A." (Greek: ΟΣΥ Α.Ε.) and is a subsidiary of OASA S.A. The merger was officially announced on June 10, 2011. While merger at the top management level took place immediately, integration of the former companies at operations and support level proceeds slowly.

The network consisted of 22 trolleybus routes which cover 390 kilometers in Athens urban area. The fleet consisted of 366 trolleybuses, made by Neoplan and Van Hool, 51 of which are articulated. 10.6 million kilometers are covered, and 80 million passengers are transported per year. As of May 2011, the company had about 1,200 employees.

== Trolleybus Routes ==
There are 20 trolleybus routes which are active today.

- Line 1: Attiki Square - Kallithea - Moschato
- Line 2: Ano Kypseli - Pagrati - Kaisariani
- Line 3: Nea Filadelfeia - Ano Patisia - Neo Psychiko
- Line 4: Ano Kypseli - Agios Artemios - Agios Ioannis Metro Station
- Line 5: Lambrini - Syntagma Square - Tzitzifies
- Line 6: Ippokratous - Kosmas Aitolos - Nea Filadelfeia
- Line 10: Tzitzifies - Chalandri
- Line 11: Ano Patisia - Neo Pagrati - Nea Elvetia (operating 24/7)
- Line 12: Zappeio - Peristeri (Agios Ierotheos)
- Line 14: Lambrini - Alexandras Avenue - Girokomeio
- Line 15: Petralona - Dikastiria - Eleftheriou Venizelou
- Line 16: Agios Ioannis Renti - Piraeus (circular)
- Line 17: Piraeus - Agios Georgios (circular)
- Line 18: Mouseio - Chalandri (via Ethinikis Antistaseos)
- Line 19: Mouseio - Chalandri Station (Sidera)
- Line 19B: Mouseio - Chalandri (Sidera) (circular)
- Line 20: Neo Faliro - Kastella - Drapetsona
- Line 21: Nikaia - Petrou Ralli - Omonoia (circular)
- Line 24: Petroupoli - Ilion - Agios Antonios Metro Station (circular)
- Line 25: Agios Antonios Metro Station - Ilion - Kamatero (circular)

== Trolleybus depots (active) ==
- Attiki Square
- Nea Filadelfeia (Kokkinos Milos)
- Petrou Ralli

== Gallery ==
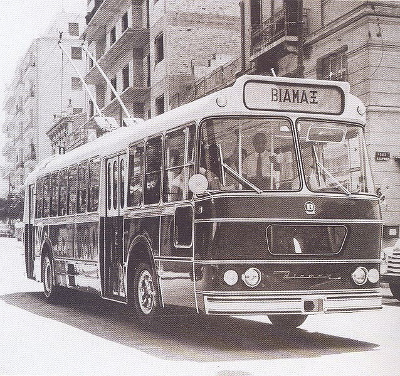
An old Biamax F600 trolleybus (1962 model)

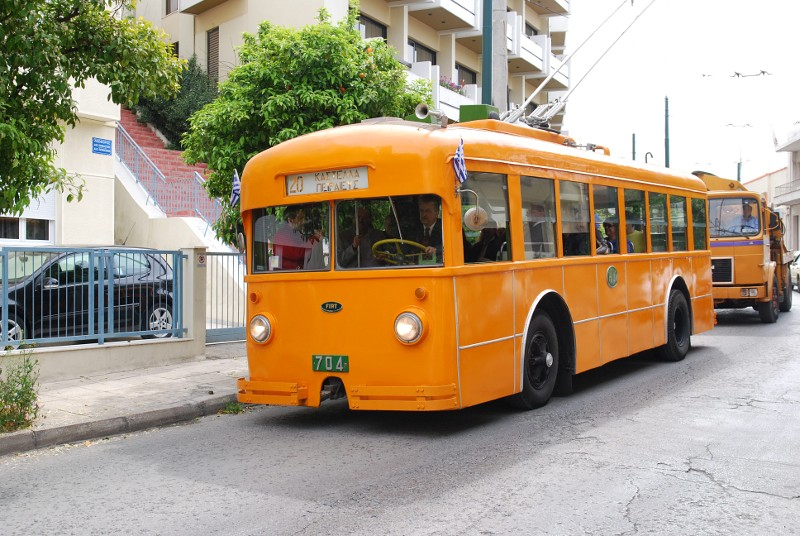
Preserved vintage trolleybus Fiat 656F of Piraeus-Kastella line

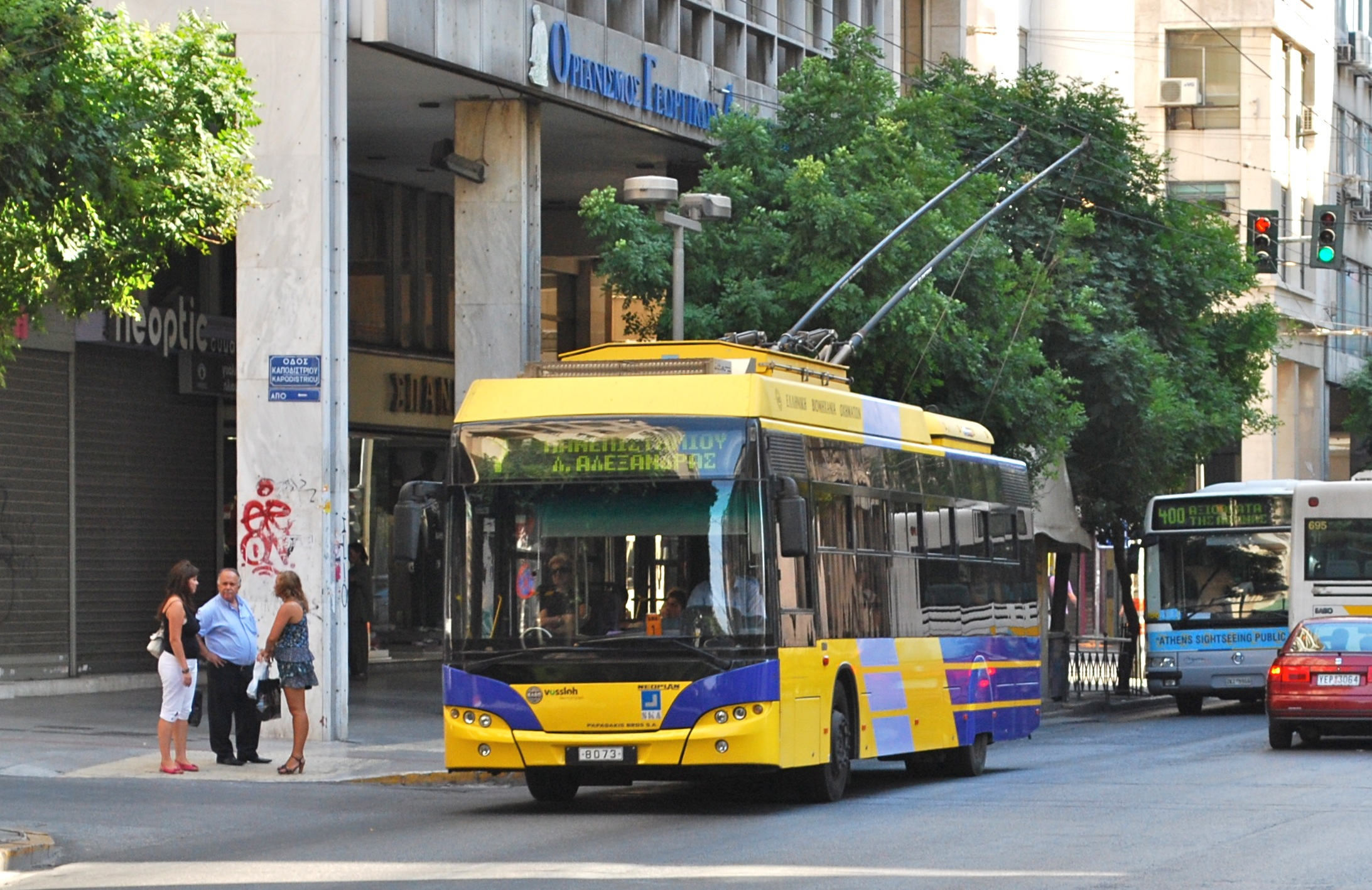
A Neoplan trolleybus in Athens, 2009

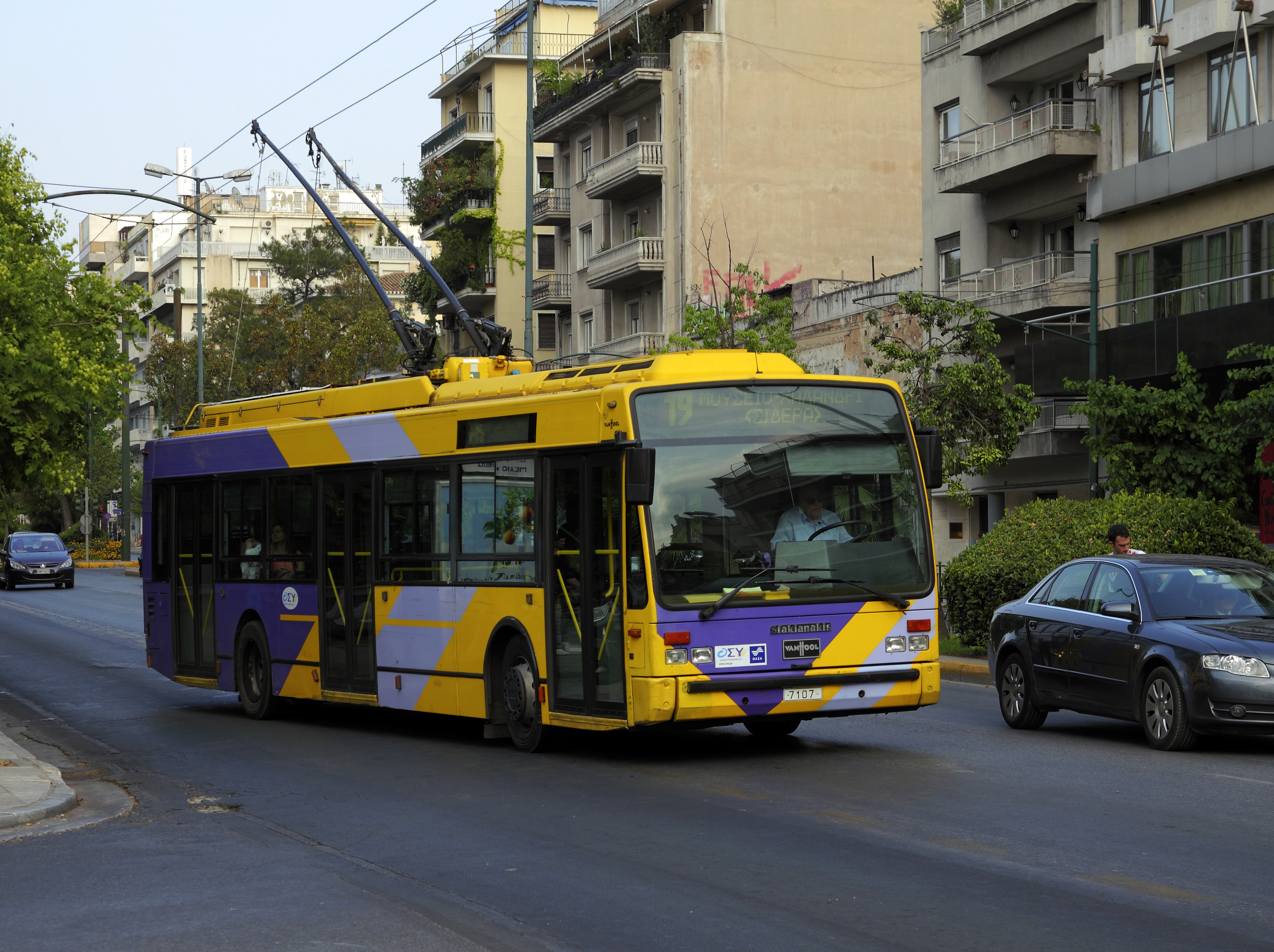
A Van Hool trolleybus in Athens

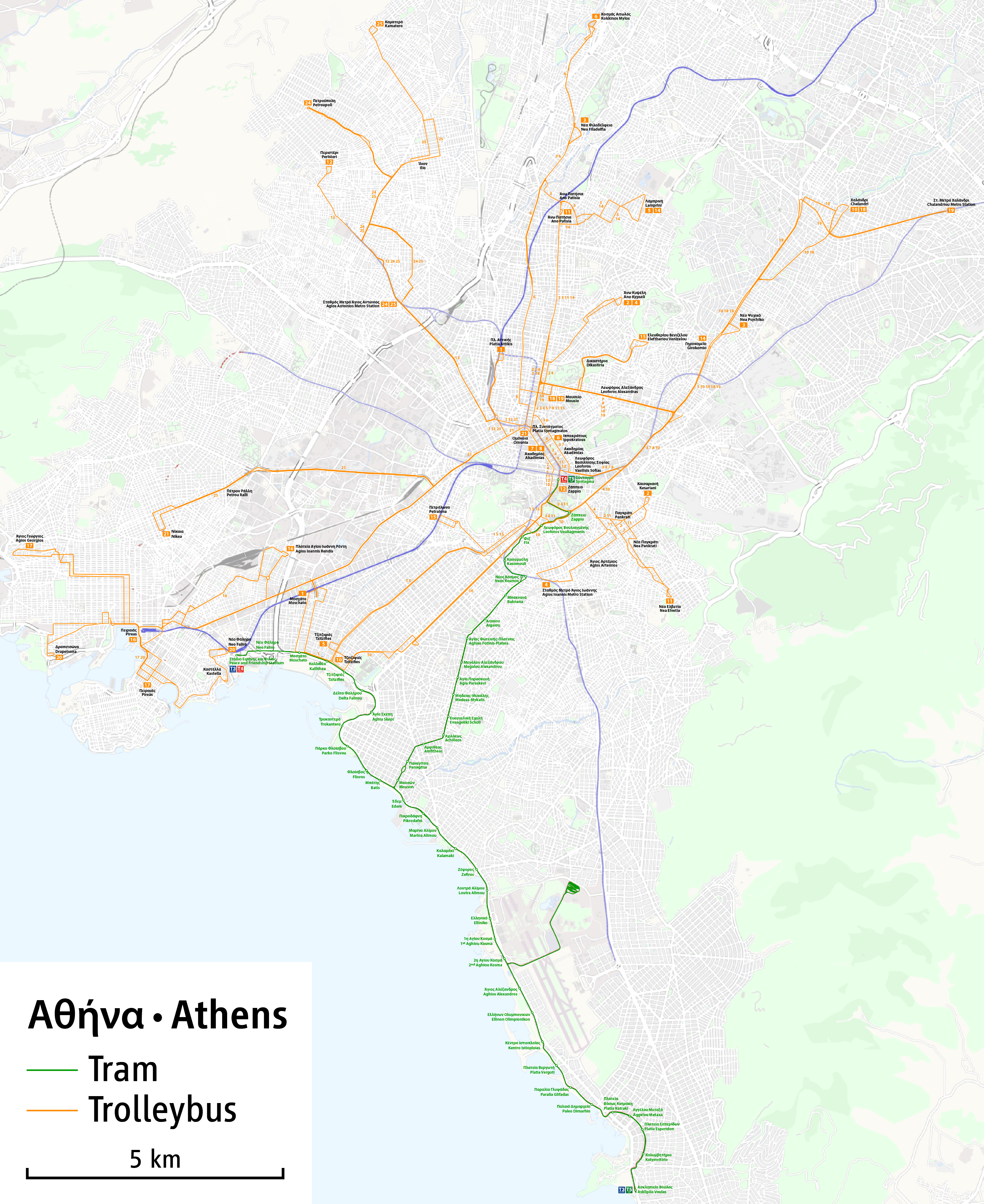
Trolleybus network
