= Mount Lycabettus =

Hill in Athens, Greece

Lykavittos Λυκαβηττός
- Neighborhood
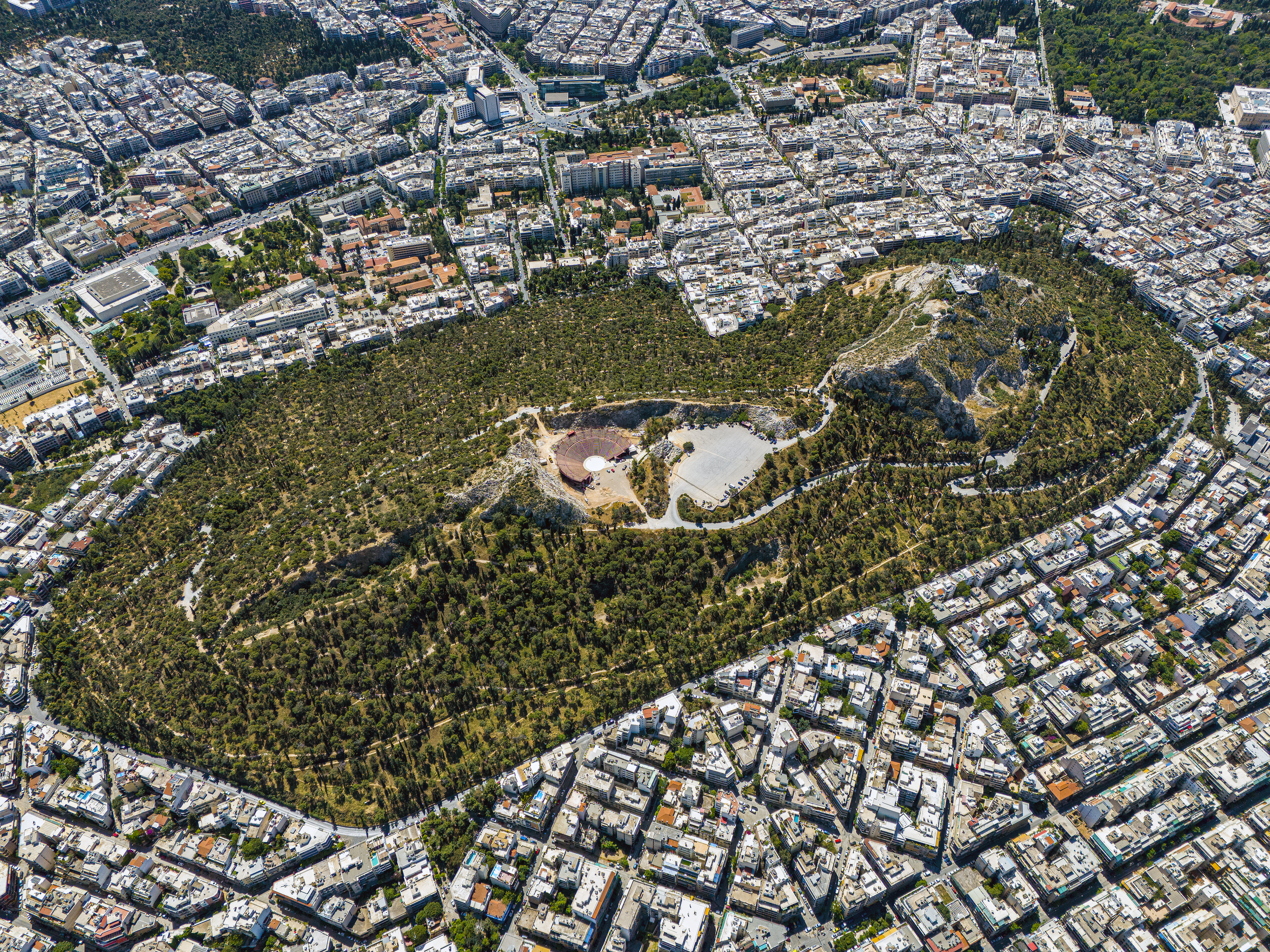
- Mount Lycabettus
- Interactive map of Lykavittos
- Coordinates: 37°58′40″N 23°44′30″E
- Country: Greece
- Region: Attica
- City: Athens
- Postal code: 114 71, 115 21
- Website: www.lycabettushill.com

Mount Lycabettus (/ˌlaɪkəˈbɛtəs/), also known as Lycabettos, Lykabettos or Lykavittos (Greek: Λυκαβηττός, pronounced [likaviˈtos]), is a Cretaceous limestone hill in the Greek capital Athens. At 277 meters (908 feet) above sea level, its summit is the highest point in Central Athens and pine trees cover its base. The name also refers to the residential neighbourhood immediately below the east of the hill.

The hill is a tourist destination and can be ascended by the Lycabettus Funicular, a funicular railway which climbs the hill from a lower terminus on Aristippou Street in Kolonaki. At its two peaks are the 19th century Chapel of St. George, a theatre, and a restaurant.

== Mythical and legendary stories ==
Lycabettus appears in various legends. Popular stories suggest it was once the refuge of wolves (lycos in Greek), which is possibly the origin of its name (means "the one [the hill] that is walked by wolves"). Another etymology suggests a Pelasgian, pre-Mycenean, origin (Lucabetu=mastoid hill).

Mythologically, Lycabettus is credited to Athena, who created it when she dropped a limestone mountain she had been carrying from the Pallene peninsula for the construction of the Acropolis after the box holding Erichthonius was opened.

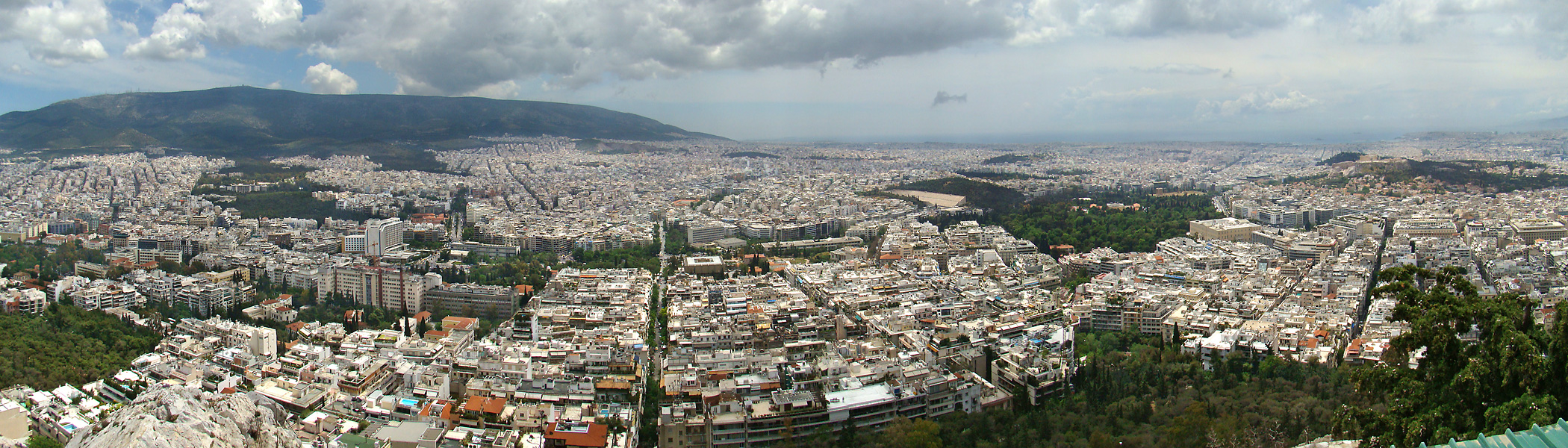
Panorama from Mount Lycabettus, with a view of the Panathinaiko Stadium, the Temple of Olympian Zeus, the Hellenic Parliament and the Acropolis of Athens.

== Theatre ==
The hill has a large open-air amphitheatre near the top, which has housed many Greek and international concerts. In 2008 it closed due to safety concerns. By 2022 the city of Athens suggested renovating and reopening the theatre. After being closed for 15 years, the theatre was reopened in September of 2023. Among the artists who have performed at the Lycabettus theatre are Arca, Ray Charles, Joan Baez, B.B. King, Chuck Berry, Jerry Lee Lewis, Leonard Cohen, James Brown, Bob Dylan, Paco De Lucia, Evanescence, Al Di Meola, John Mc Laughlin, Gary Moore, Peter Gabriel, Black Sabbath, Nick Cave, Bjork, Dead Can Dance, Pet Shop Boys, Deep Purple, UB40, Placebo, Morrissey, Radiohead, Moby, Massive Attack, Faith No More, Faithless, Whitesnake, Tracy Chapman, Nightwish, Slipknot, Patti Smith, Vanessa Mae, Bryan Ferry, Tito Puente, Buena Vista Social Club, Orishas, The Prodigy, Iron Maiden, Nazareth, Blackmore's Night, Scorpions, Mathame, Adriatique Human Rias, Rotting Christ and King Gizzard & the Lizard Wizard.

== Gallery ==
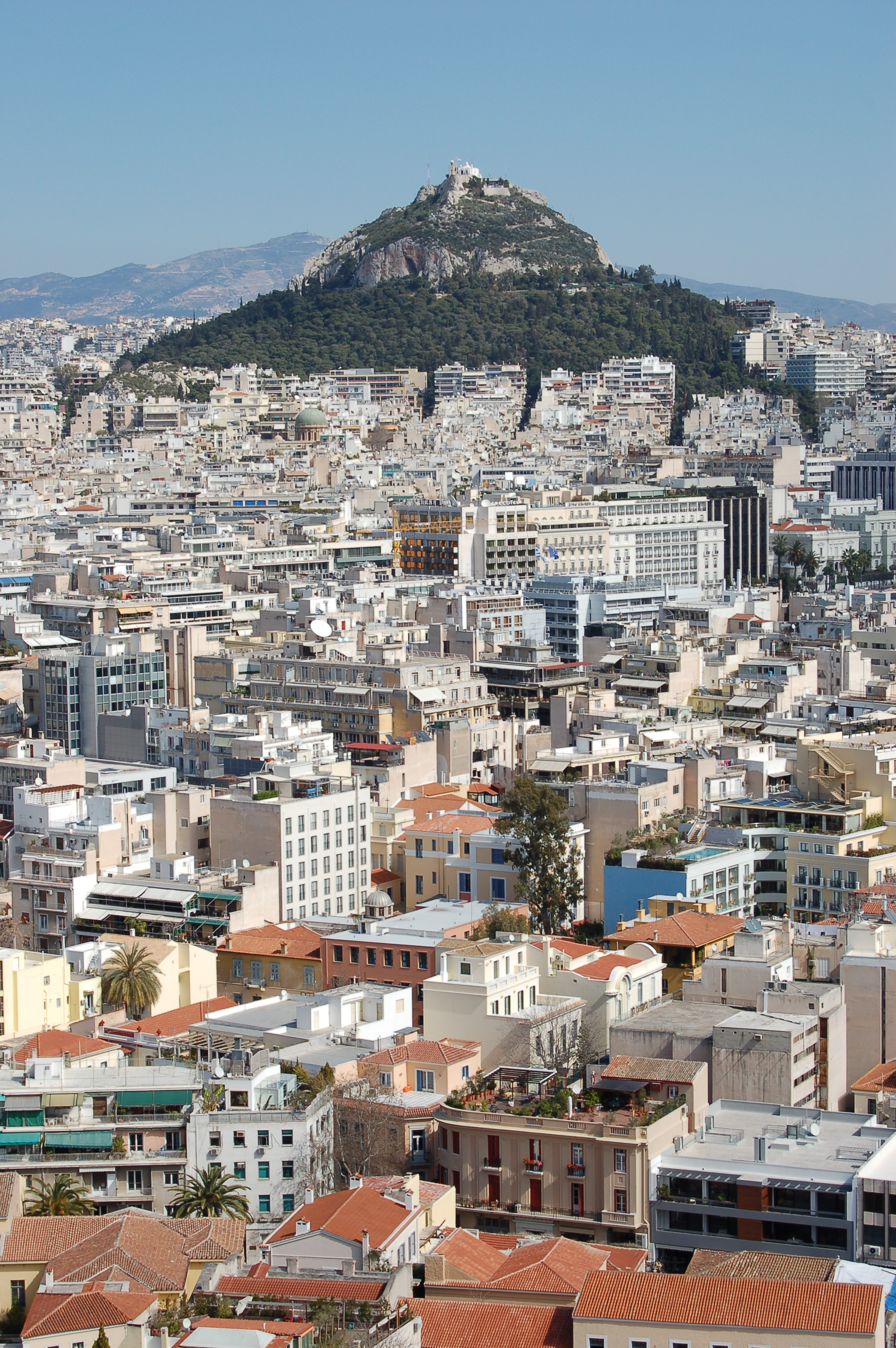

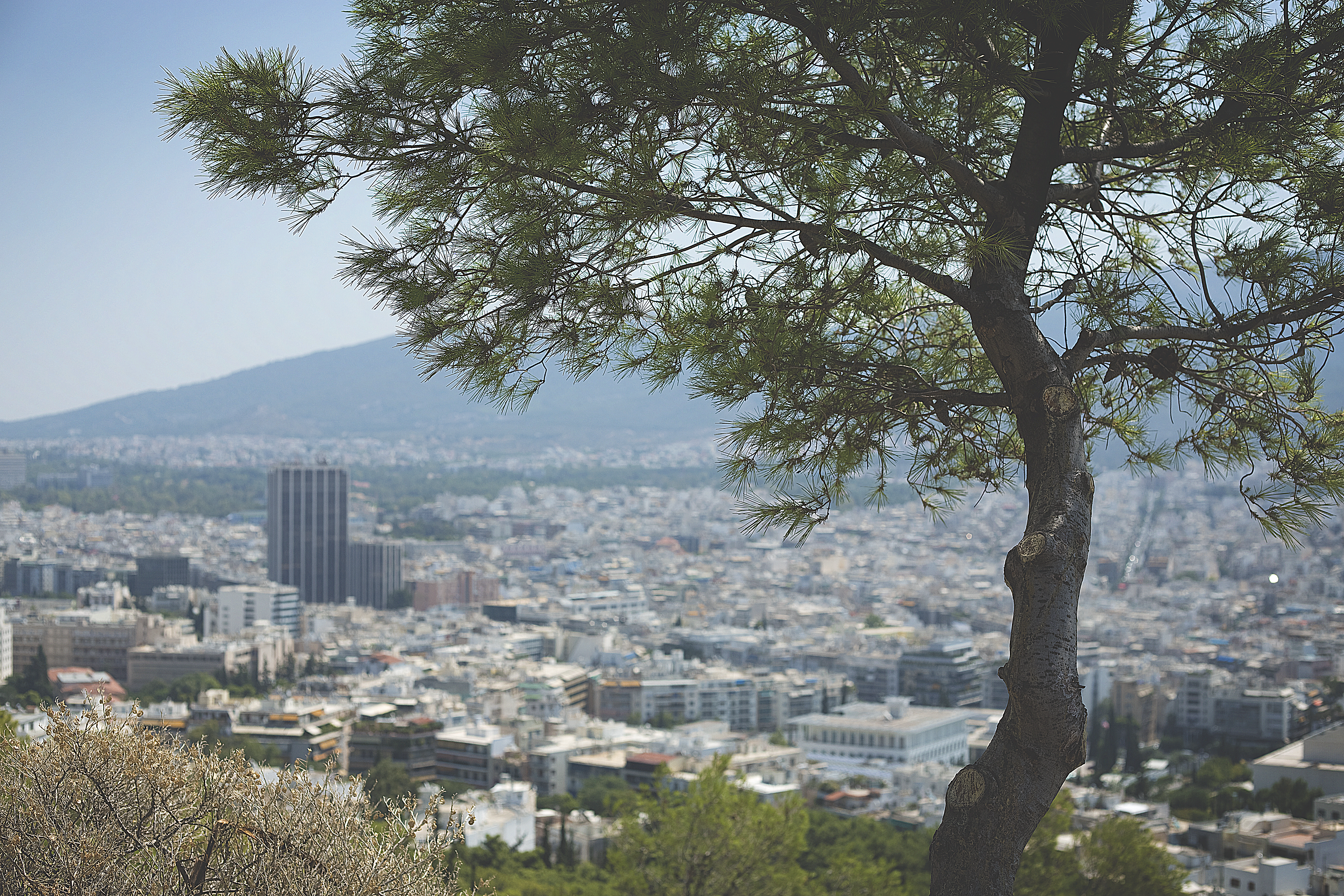
View from Lykavittos Hill over Athens

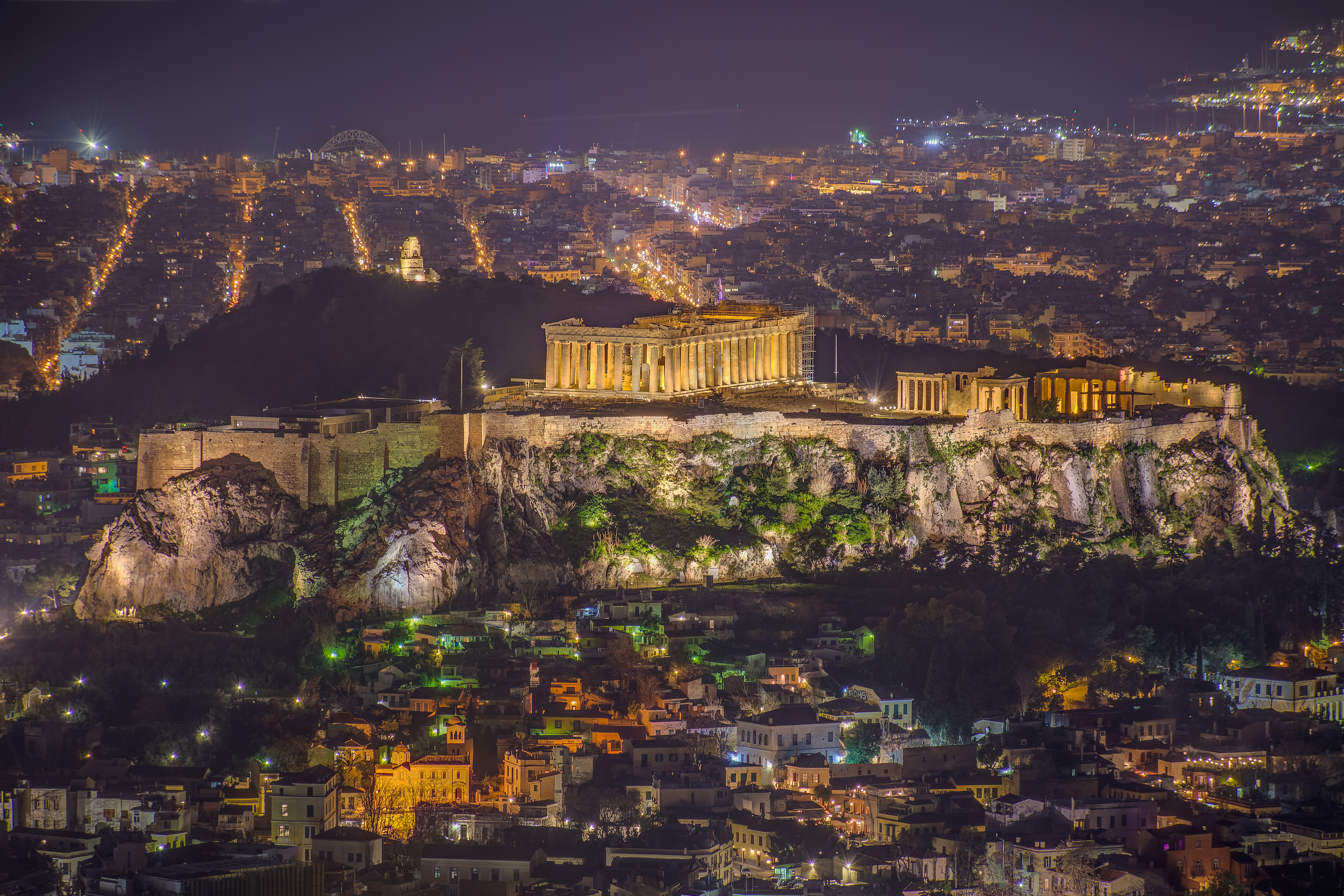
View of the Acropolis at night

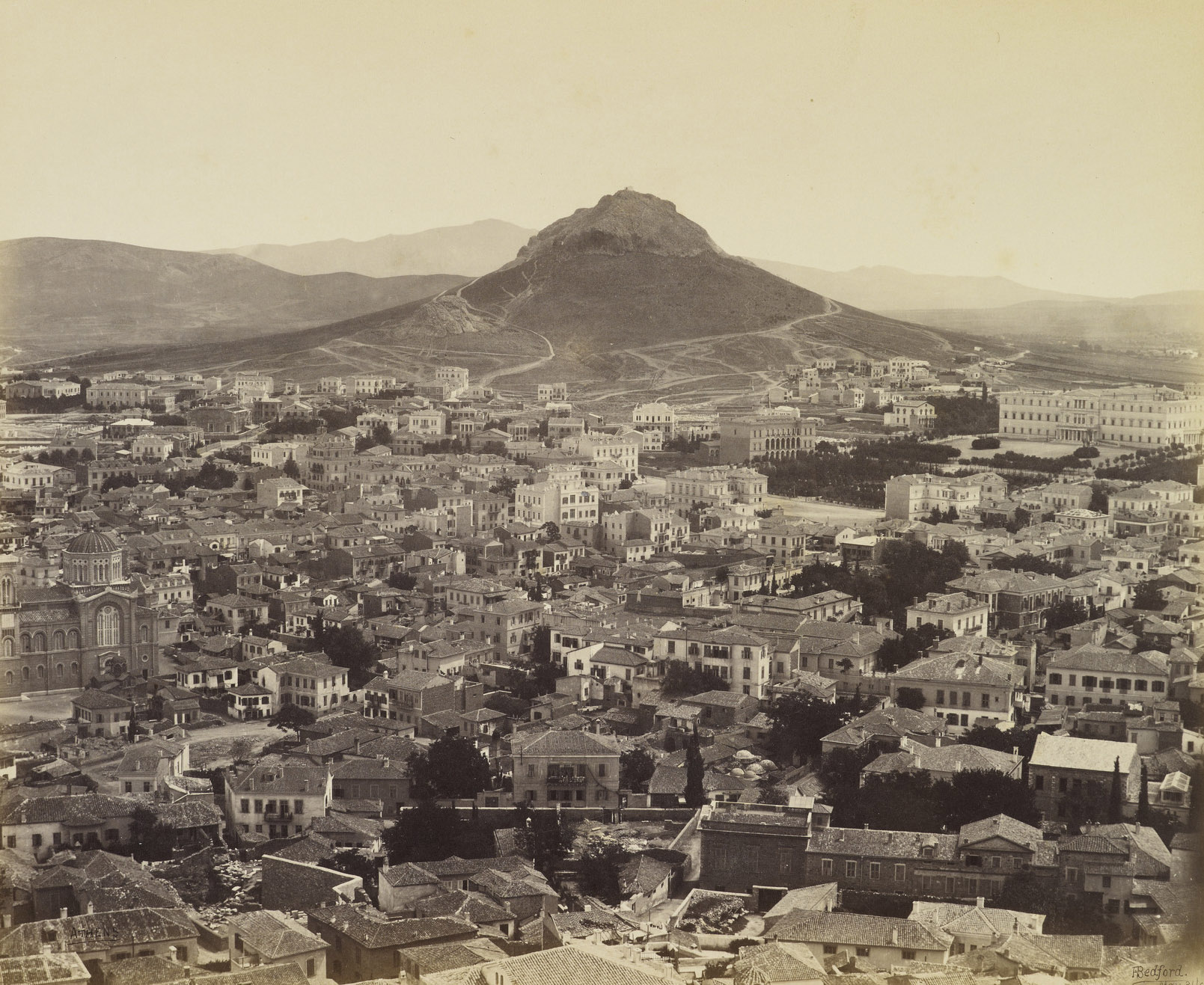
View from the Acropolis by Francis Bedford, 1862

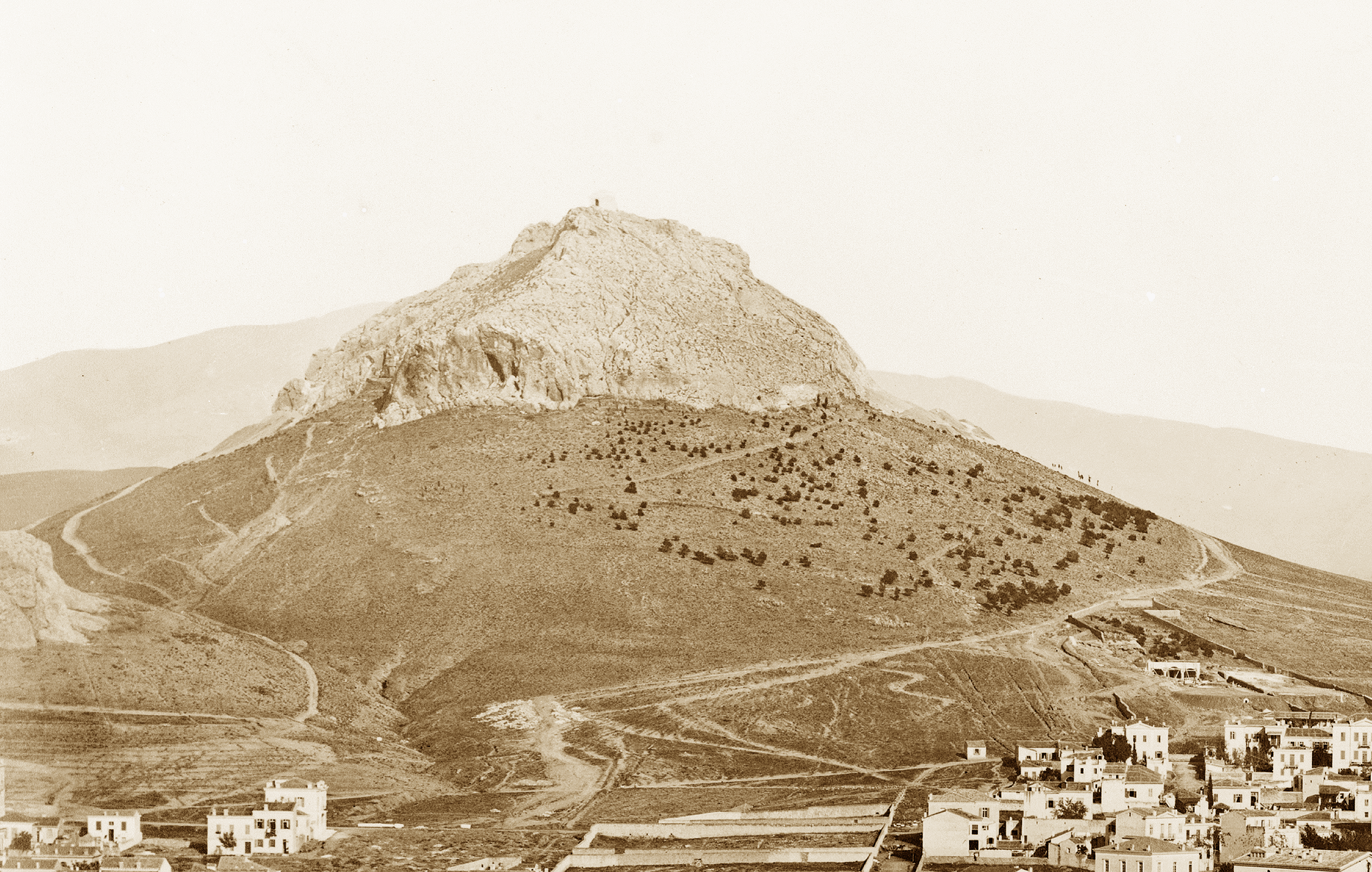
Lycabettus c. 1870-80, without St. George's Chapel and before the modern planting of pine trees

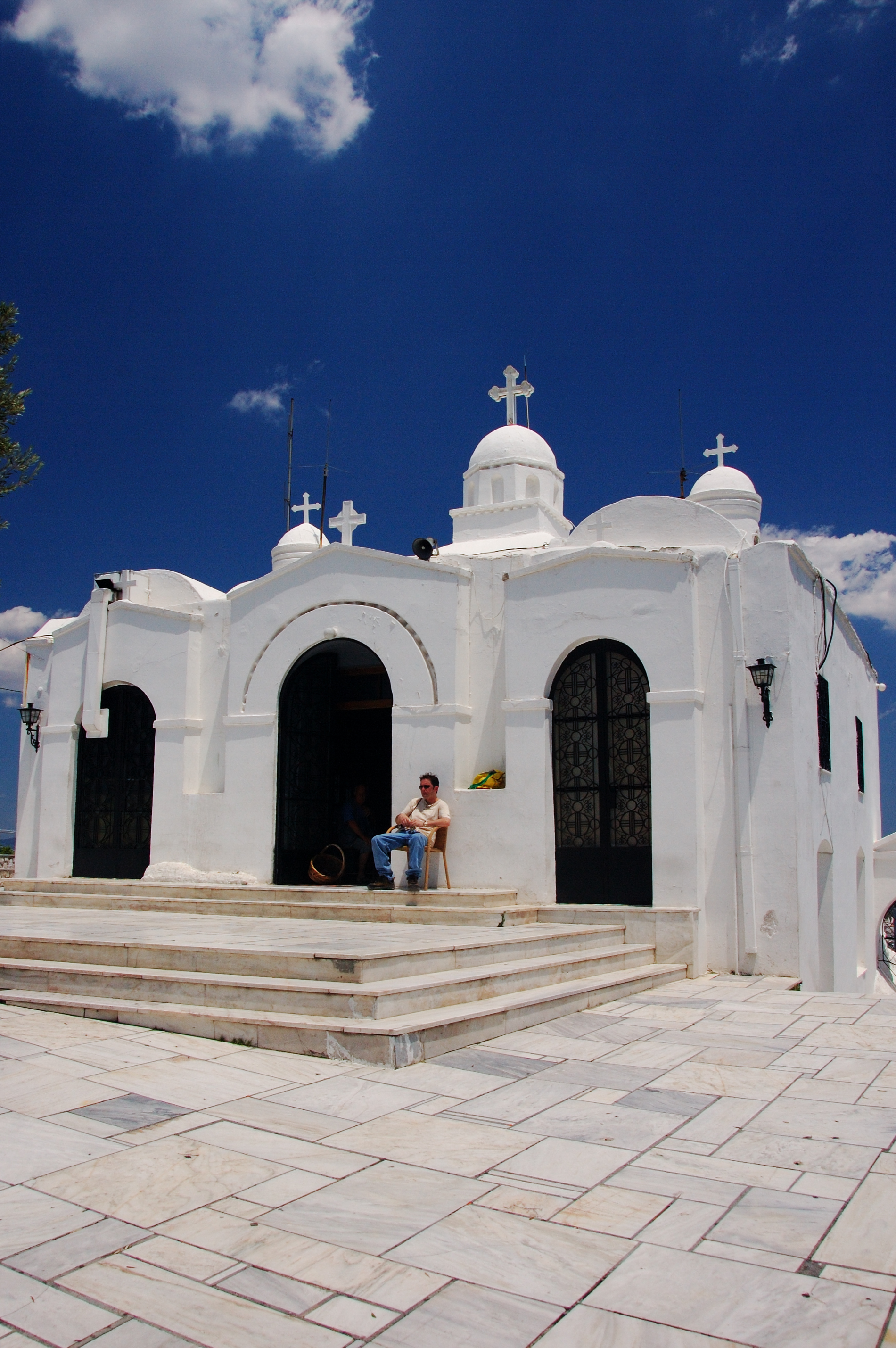
Saint George's chapel on top

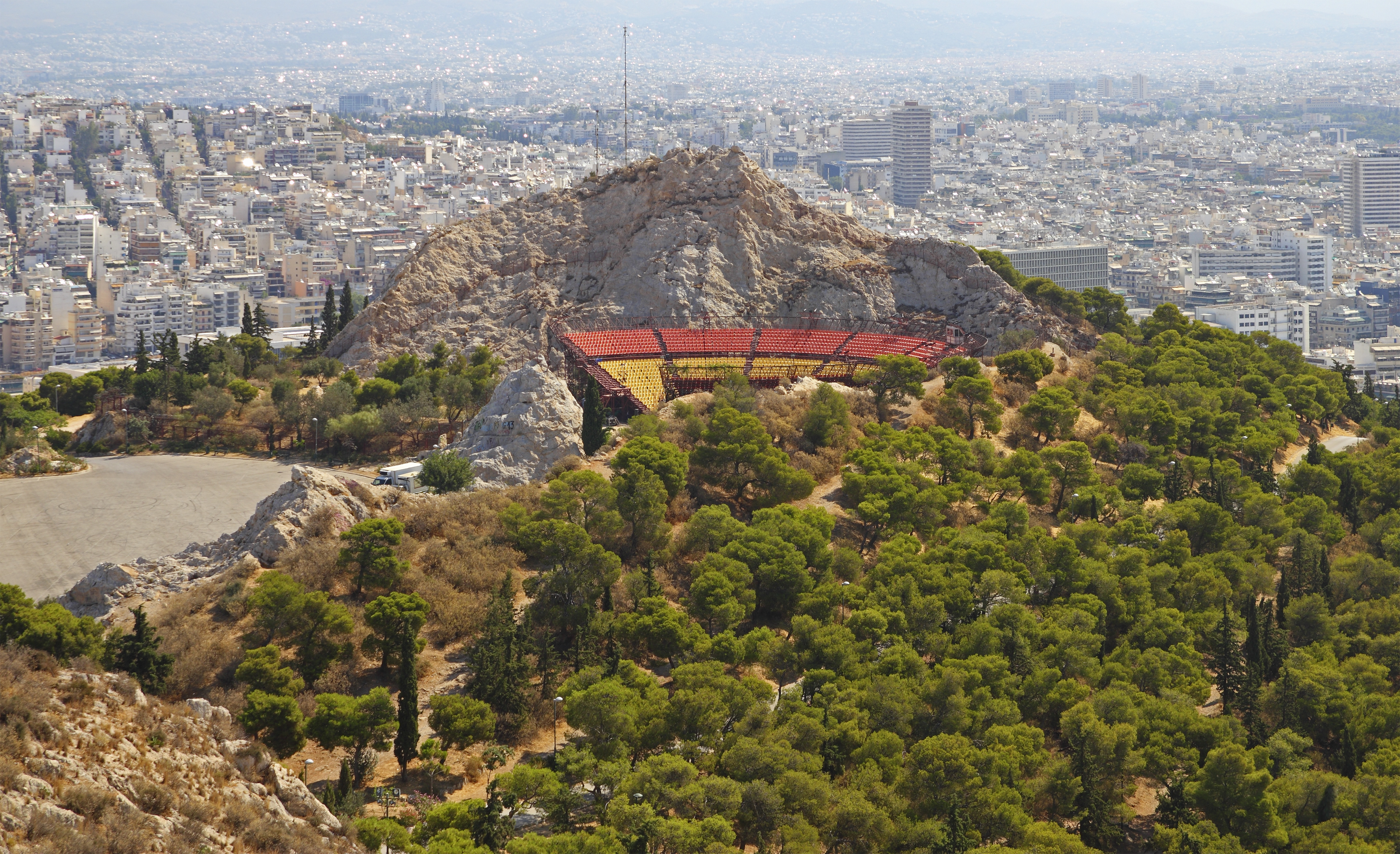
Theatre of Lycabettus

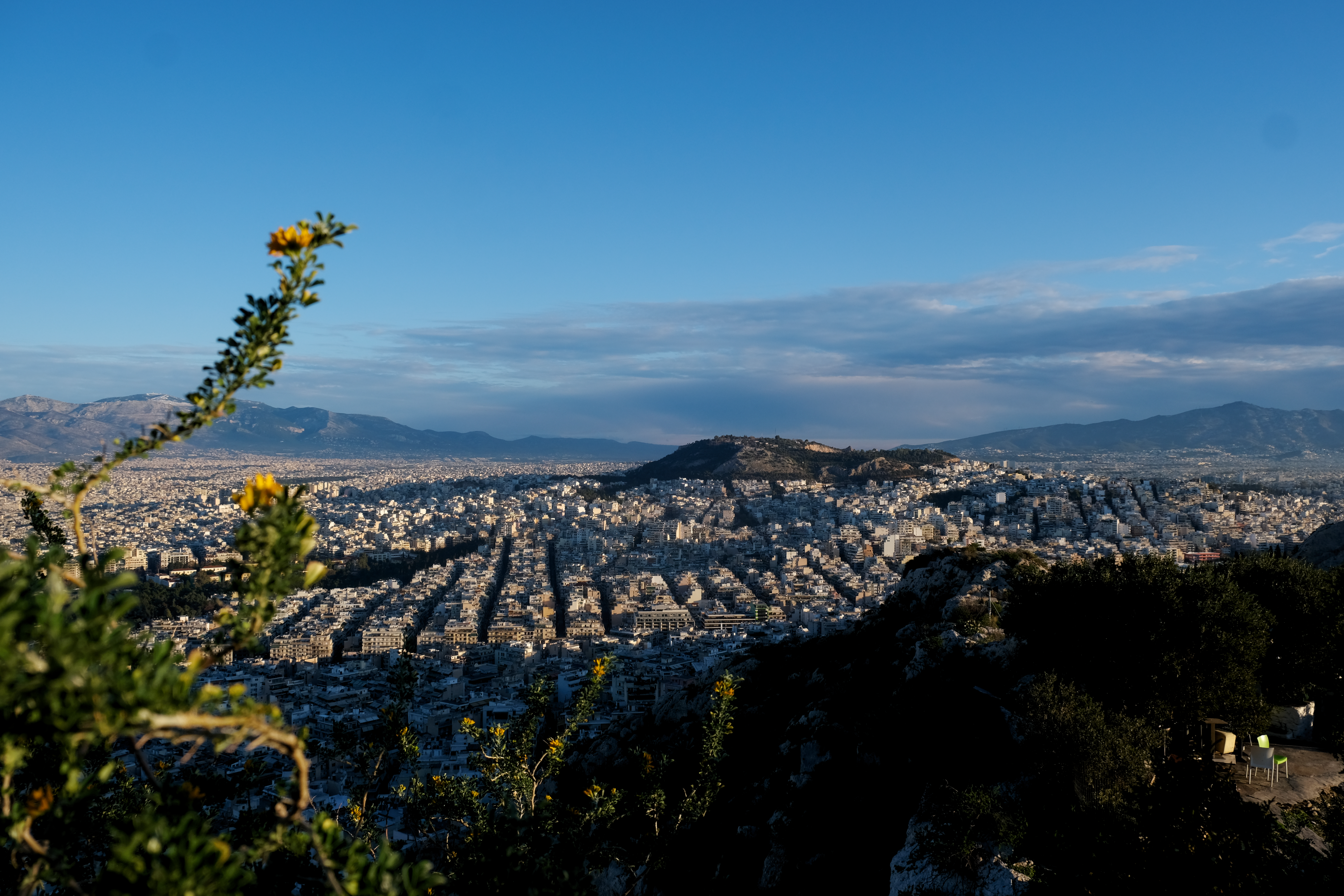
View of Athens looking east

== See also ==
- List of contemporary amphitheatres
