= Neoplan N407 =

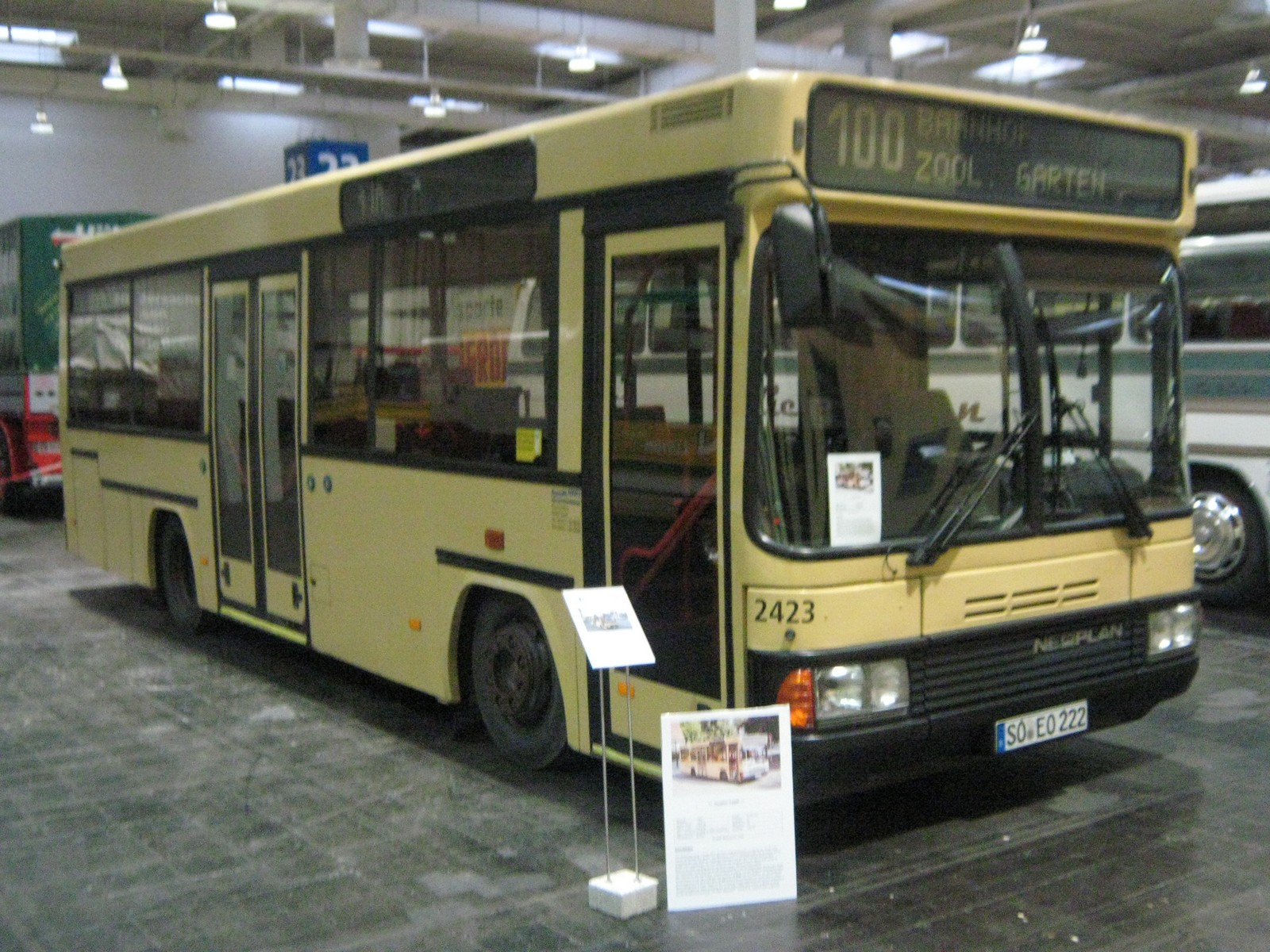

Overview
- Manufacturer: Neoplan
- Production: 1989–1992
- Assembly: Stuttgart, Germany

Body and chassis
- Class: Midibus
- Body style: Single-decker city bus

Powertrain
- Engine: Mercedes-Benz OM 352

Dimensions
- Length: 7.75 metres
- Width: 2.52 metres
- Height: 3.11 metres

Chronology
- Successor: Neoplan N4007

Neoplan N407 was a midibus built by Neoplan, and was the smallest among the Neoplan N400-series buses. It was first showed in 1983, when for long time on German market there was no short low-capacity bus. The bus can carry 52 passengers on board, including 27 passengers with seats.

In 1986 model had a frontwall facelift, the engine was replaced too, although it is a bus produced as a midibus in between a minibus and a full-size single-decker.

Neoplan N407 is used on buslines with a little stream of passengers or in small cities.

In 1998, Greek manufacturer ELVO created its C97. N4007 bus model, based on a Neoplan N407 chassis. 200 buses were delivered to ETHEL, the body providing bus services in Athens at the time, between 1998 and 2000 and retired in February 2025.

== Competitors ==
- MAN Lion's City M
- Volvo B6
- Optare MetroRider
- Dennis Dart
