= Lycabettus Funicular =

Inclined railway in Athens

Coordinates: 37.9804°N 23.7440°E

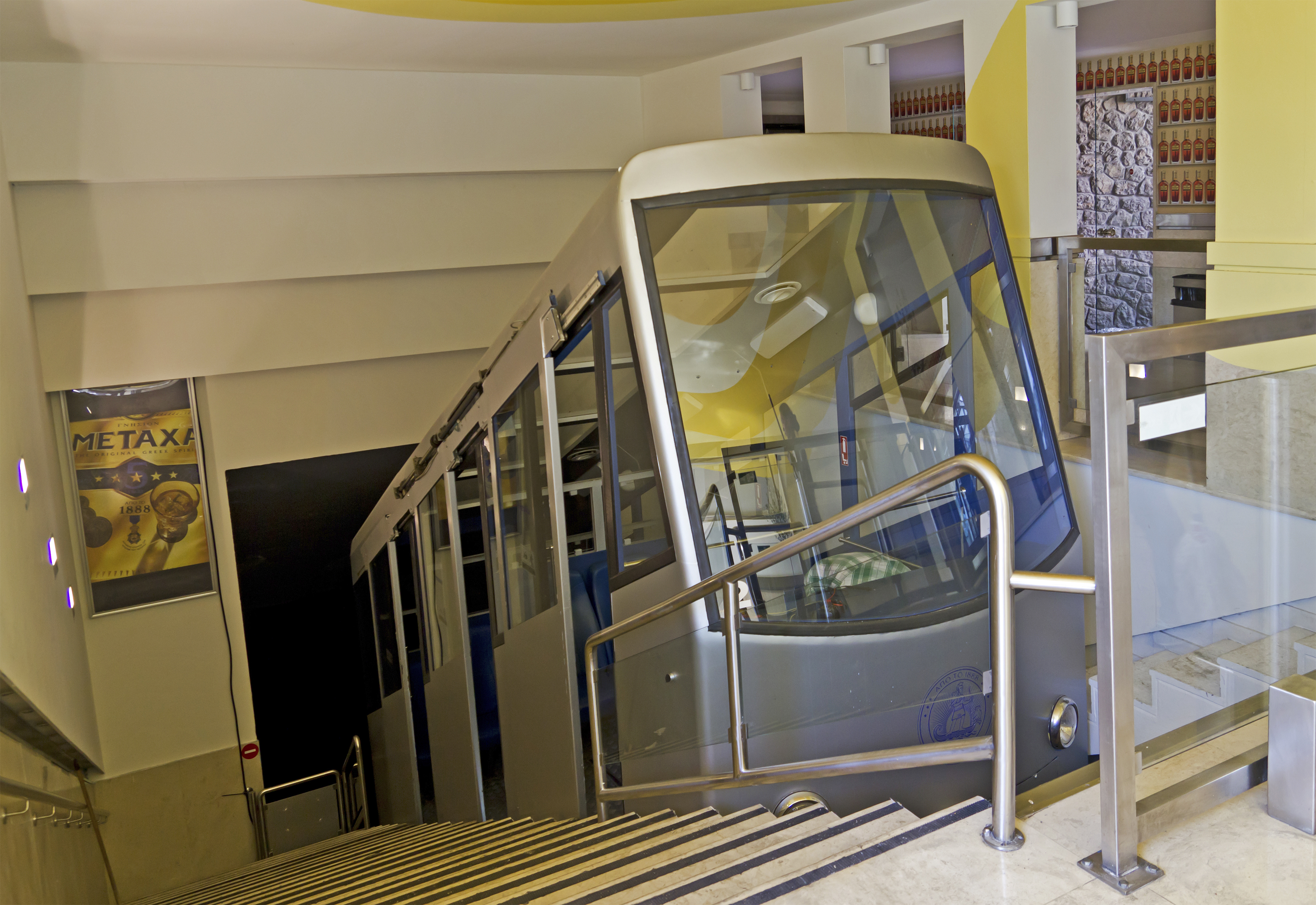
- Railway car in the upper station

Technical
- Track length: 210 metres (690 ft)
- Maximum incline: 28°

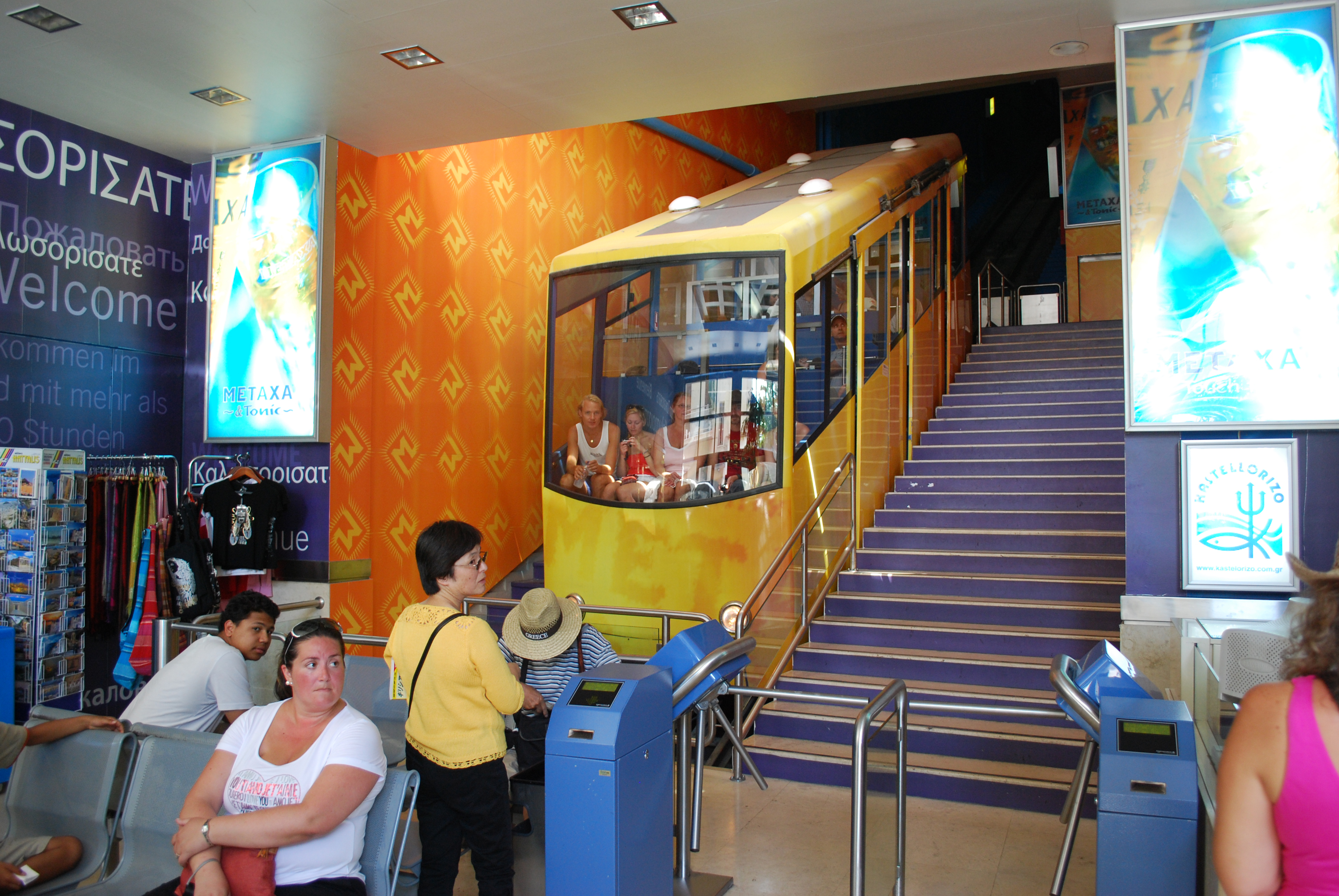
Car in the lower station

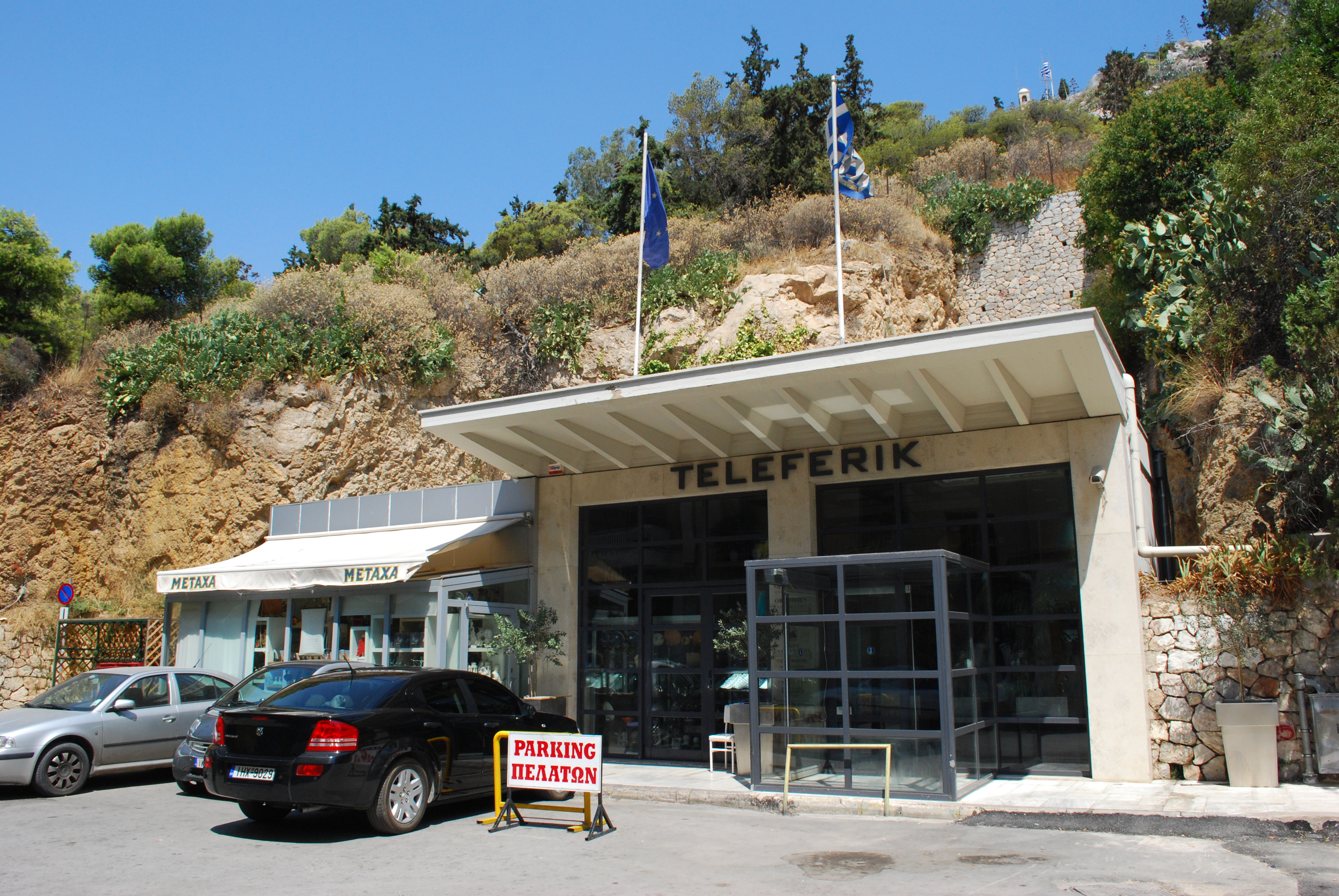
The lower station from the street

The Lycabettus Funicular is a funicular railway to the top of Mount Lycabettus in Athens, Greece. It was constructed in the 1960s by the Greek Tourist Organisation (EOT) and was inaugurated on April 18, 1965. The terminal stations are at Aristippou street, in Kolonaki, and the Chapel of St. George, near the top of the hill. Between them, the line is entirely in tunnel.

In 2002 extensive refurbishment was carried out, replacing the motor, the hydraulic brake unit, the electronics safety systems, the control room, and the two cars of the funicular. The railway runs seven days a week, every 10-30 minutes, with a peak capacity of about 400 persons per hour.

== Operation ==
The line has the following parameters:

Number of cars	2
Number of stops	2
Configuration	Single track with passing loop
Track length	210 metres (689 ft)
Maximum gradient	28°
Maximum speed	7.2 kilometres per hour (4.5 mph)
Journey time	3 mins
Capacity	34 passengers per car

== See also ==
- List of funicular railways
