= Panagis Kalkos =

Greek architect

Panagis Kalkos (Greek: Παναγής Κάλκος, 1818–1875) was one of the first Greek architects of the modern Greek state. Educated in Munich, he is a representative of a strict neoclassic style in architecture. He built some of the most characteristic neoclassic buildings, both public and private, of Athens, many of which still survive today.

== Biographical information ==
Panagis Kalkos (or Kalkos-Vretos) was born in 1818 into an old Athenian family. His father, Michael, was killed during the siege of the Acropolis during the Greek War of Independence and he, himself, was taken prisoner.

After the creation of the independent Greek state, he worked as an employee of the Ministry of Internal Affairs. From 1837 he started studies in architecture with a scholarship provided by King Otto. Upon his return to Greece, he was employed as an architect at the Ministry of Internal Affairs. It has been reported that with this capacity he worked as an assistant of the Bavarian architects Riedel and Hoch, who built the Royal Palace upon the plans of Friedrich von Gaertner.

From 1851 onwards he collaborates with the Greek Archaeological Service for the survey of the monuments on the Acropolis of Athens. His plans of the Erechtheion were published in 1853.

He was a member of the commission constituted in 1860 upon the initiative of the Municipal Council of Athens for the drawing of a topographical plan of the capital. He died in Athens on 18 November 1875.

== Main works ==
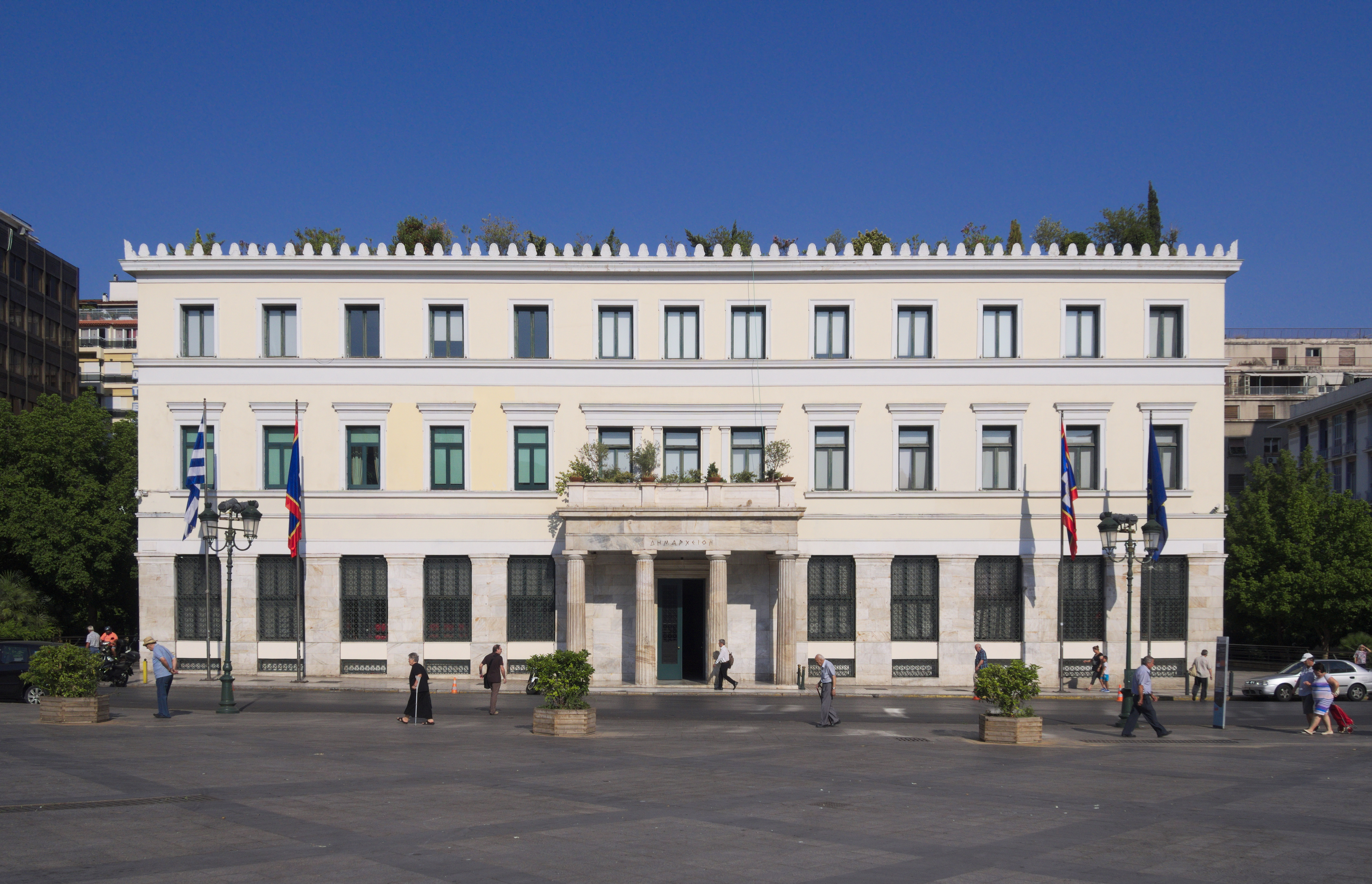
Athens City Hall (1874) by Panagis Kalkos

Several well known buildings are included among Kalkos's works:

- The mansion of publisher Andreas Koromilas on Syntagma Square, situated on the south side of the square at the corner of Ermou Street. Built in 1853, it was initially two-storey, with a third floor added after King Otto's expulsion. The building was demolished in early 1960s.
- The original building (built 1857–1859, demolished in 1956) of Varvakeion Lyceum (boys’ high school), built with a donation of Ioannis Varvakis, a wealthy member of the Greek diaspora, on the square bearing the same name, delimited between Athinas, Sokratous, Armodiou and Aristogeitonos Streets.
- The Parliament House (today Old Parliament Building, housing the National Historical Museum), which was to house the assemblies of Parliament and of the Senate. It was founded in 1858 and construction started upon the plans of the French architect François-Florimond Boulanger. After the expulsion of King Otto (1862) and the implementation of the Constitution of 1864, the Senate was abolished. After an interruption of the building works, the plans were modified by Panagis Kalkos. The main change in these plans was the abolishment of the Senate assembly hall. The building was thus completed in 1871.
- The block of flats belonging to I. Koutsogiannis, member of the Municipal Council. The building was built on Deligiorgis 8 and Agisilaou streets at the Metaxourgeio neighbourhood. It is a typical three-storey urban Athenian house, containing five independent flats, built around 1870.
- The initial building of the old Acropolis Museum, founded in 1865 at the southeast corner of the Acropolis of Athens and completed in 1874. In 1875 Kalkos, acting as a collaborator of the Archaeological Service, coordinated the transfer of the antiquities within its halls. The museum was later extended and several internal changes were brought to its internal disposition.
- The Athens City Hall on Athinas street in Kotzia Square. It was built with two storeys between 1872 and 1874.
- The Municipal Nursery (later Municipal Gallery of Athens) on Koumoundourou square on Pireos Street. Built between 1872 and 1875.
- The Municipal School (today 74th Primary School of Athens), the first public peer education school in Athens. It is a one storey building on Adrianou Street (at the corner of Flessa Street) in Plaka, built between 1875 and 1876.

Kalkos also contributed in the completion of the following buildings.

- Amalieion Orphanage: construction began by architect Dimitrios Zezos in the plot between today’s streets Herodou Attikou, Lykeiou, Stisihorou and Georgiou II΄. After Zezos’s death in 1857, Kalkos was entrusted with the completion of the building.
- Athens Metropolitan Cathedral (Orthodox Cathedral): founded in 1842 upon plans by Theophil Hansen. The initial plans were revised by Dimitrios Zezos, who continued the construction in a "Hellenic Byzantine" style. After Zezos's death in 1857, the works were taken over, with further modifications of the plans, by François-Florimond Boulanger, while Kalkos was entrusted with the supervision of the building site till its completion in 1860.
- Church of Panagia Chrysospiliotissa on Aiolou street: built on the site of a previous church, ruined during the 1821 Greek War of Independence. Kalkos worked for the new church since 1863 (when the permit was issued) implementing the plans of Dimitrios Zezos, but he died before its completion.
- National Archaeological Museum on Patission Street: founded in 1866, construction was begun upon plans and supervision of Kalkos, who had revised an older building proposal by Lange. Kalkos worked on the museum building till the very day of his death.

== Bibliography ==
- Vogiatzi, Ι. Markassioti Ν., Chorianopoulou, Μ., Athens: The City, the People, the Events, Historical and Ethnological Society of Greece, Athens 2014.
- Εγκυκλοπαιδικόν Λεξικόν Ελευθερουδάκη [Eleftheroudakis Encyclopedia Lexicon], vol. 7, p. 109, Athens 1929.
- Kokkou, A., Η Μέριμνα για τις Αρχαιότητες στην Ελλάδα και τα Πρώτα Μουσεία [The Care for Antiquities in Greece and the First Museums], Athens 1977.
- Mallouchou-Tufano, F., Η Αναστήλωση των Αρχαίων Μνημείων στη Νεώτερη Ελλάδα (1834–1939) [The Anastylosis of Ancient Monuments in Modern Greece (1834–1939)], Βιβλιοθήκη της εν Αθήναις Αρχαιολογικής Εταιρείας [Library of the Archaeological Society of Athens] no. 176, Athens 1998.
- Biris, Κ. Η., Αι Αθήναι από του 19ου εις τον 20όν Αιώνα [Athens from the 19th to the 20th Century], Athens 1995 2.
- Biris, M., Kardamitsi-Adami, M., Νεοκλασική αρχιτεκτονική στην Ελλάδα [Neoclassical Architecture in Greece], Athens 2001.
- Biris M.G., Νεοελληνική Αρχιτεκτονική 1875–1925 [Neohellenic Architecture 1875–1925], Athens 2003 2.
- Παγκόσμιο Βιογραφικό Λεξικό (λήμμα Μάνου Μπίρη) [Universal Biographical Lexicon (entry on Manos Biris), vol. 4, p. 218, Ekdotike Athinon, Athens 1985.
- Papyros – Larousse – Britannica, Athens 2007, vol. 26, p. 656.
