= Municipal Gallery of Athens =

Art museum in Greece

Coordinates: 37.982769°N 23.719426°E

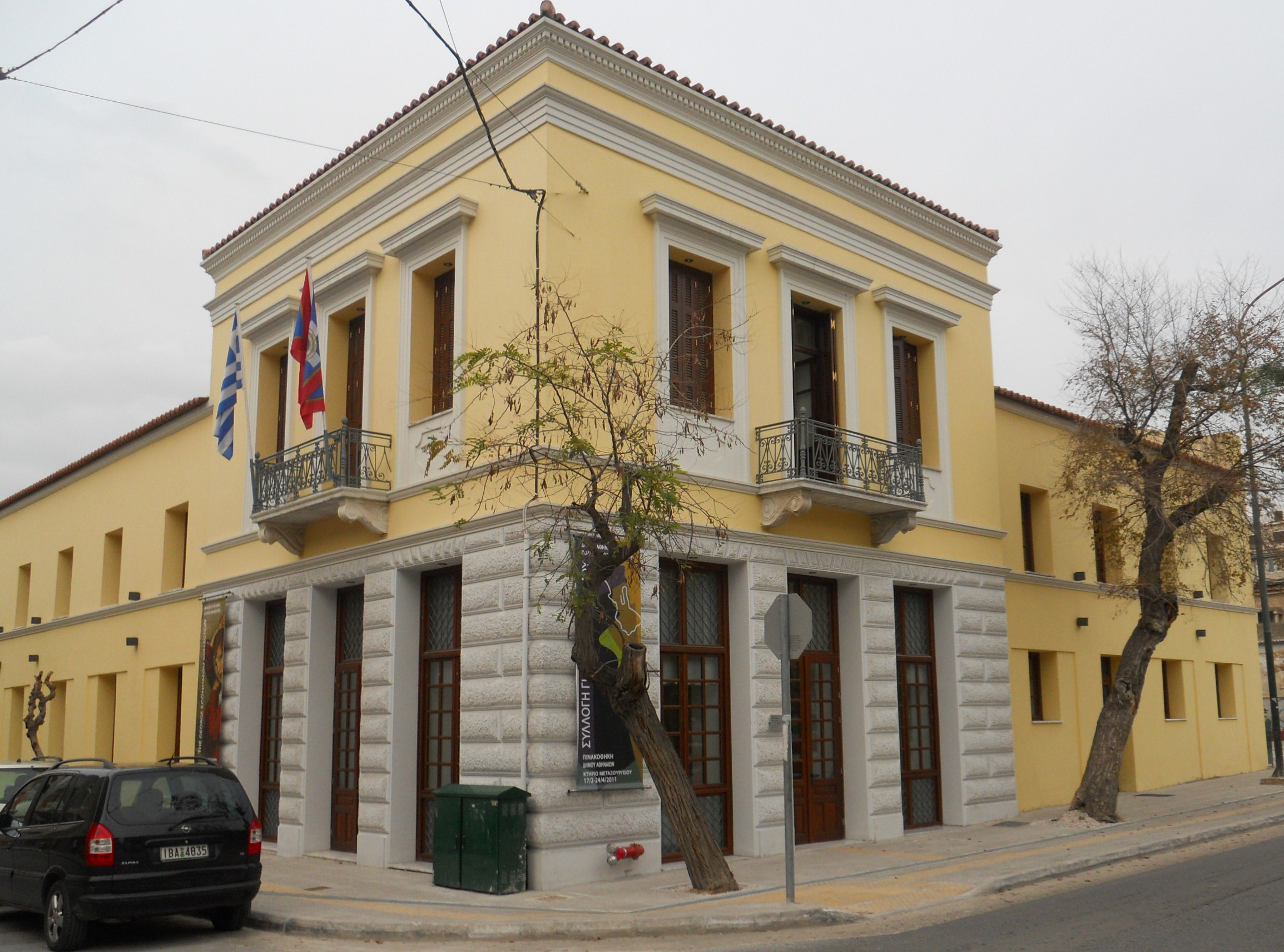
- Location: Myllerou 32; Athens 10436, Greece
- Type: Arts centre
- Director: Nelli Kyriazi
- Public transit access: Metaxourgeio (Μεταξουργείο) metro station

The Municipal Gallery of Athens is a museum in Athens, Greece. It houses a rich collection of nearly 3,000 works from leading 19th- and 20th-century Greek artists. Formerly located on Peiraios Street on Eleftherias (Koumoundourou) Square, in October 2010 the gallery moved three blocks northwest to the corner of Myllerou and Leonidou streets on Avdi Square in Metaxourgeio. The move added another dimension to the gallery's draw, as its current building was designed in the early 19th century by prominent architect Christian Hansen.

The gallery is open Tuesday through Saturday from 10:00 to 14:00 and 17:00 to 21:00 (10:00 am–2:00 pm and 5:00-9:00 pm). Open Sundays from 10:00 to 14:00 (10:00 am–2:00 pm). Closed Mondays. Admission is free. (0030) 210 3243023 or (0030) 210 5202420.

== Collection and exhibitions ==
"Although the Municipal Art Gallery was formerly housed in the charming building on Koumoundourou Square, designed by Panagis Kalkos – who also designed the old town hall in Kotzia Square – we decided to relocate to solve some serious problems," explains Gallery and Museum City of Athens Director Mrs. Nelli Kyriazis.

"It was unforgivable, in my opinion and the opinion of many art lovers, especially foreigners, that the Gallery has not been able to accommodate both permanent collections and temporary exhibitions in parallel. There was rotation, due to lack of space, so guests regularly ask why we do not have a permanent collection".

What Ms. Kyriazis finds particularly interesting are these former industrial sites now transformed into cultural sites. "Especially when hosting exhibitions of modern art, I think it fits content with container.”

The gallery will host periodic exhibitions as well as permanent collections. Initially, though, it will present a permanent collection, after its first major exhibition, the gallery will then hold both permanent and temporary exhibitions concurrently.

The collection was set up in 1923 by their respective mayors and enlightened managers of the Municipal Gallery, as reported by Ms. Kyriazis, referring first to Papapanagiotou Stavros the first director then to Spyros Papaloukas, who held this position from the 1940s until his death in 1957.

"The collection includes poor representation of the 19th century with names such as Spyridon Prosalentis, Dionysios Tsokos and others, but great weight was given to the questionable 1930s and 1940s, and includes both present and modern manifestations and quests of artists," says Ms. Kyriazis.

The big names of the collection include Georgios Jakobides, Angelos Giallinas, Nikolaos Lytras, George Bouzianis, Agenor Asteriadis, Yiannis Moralis and other "precursors" of the generation such as Gerasimos Steris. Contemporary artists include Opi Zouni- recently deceased, Chronis Botsoglou and Makis Theofylaktopoulos.

Playing an essential role in this collection is a series of engravings "teachers" such as Angel Theodoropoulos, Efthimis Papadimitriou, John Kefallinos, Vaso Katraki, Tasos (Alevizos) as well as today's teachers ASFA Mihalis Arfaras and Vicky Tsalamata.

"After a presentation of a representative collection and new acquisitions, the Municipal Art Gallery will then follow with its permanent collection to ensure presentation of all works, and that the permanent collection will not remain static in the space of a gallery as it would be in a museum," concludes Ms. Kyriazis.

The first major exhibition of the new Municipal Art Gallery will be a world "premiere" of the collection of businessman and collector, Mr.George Economou. Four hundred and fifty works from the collection will be exhibited in two phases. The first of which will include, in time, works from the 15th century to works of the German New Objectivity movement of 1923, along with a collection of works by Amedeo Modigliani, Pierre Matisse, Pierre Bonnard, Picasso, Andrea Palladio, Ernst Ludwig Kirchner, Max Pechstein, Erich Heckel, Alberto Giacometti, Alexander Archipenko, Jim Drain, Lucian Freud, and Cy Twombly.

The second phase will begin with works of the Surrealist movement and end with the last expression of modernity, in Neuwilden for the decades of 1970 and 1980, while also presenting a collection of prints from many different movements.

== The building ==
The former factory was designed in 1833 by Danish architect Christian Hansen, becoming one of the oldest classics of Athens. Thanks to Hansen, and his younger brother Theophil, Athens held some of the finest buildings, which were also extremely wide buildings in pan European level. The University, which was considered to be one of the most excellent and finest buildings in Europe in the 19th century, is also the work of Christian. The "Metaxourgeio Project" was designed by Hansen in early 1830.

Hansen came to Athens at the time of King Otto, where the subsequent city was just a small town with a poor residential environment, save the Acropolis and its monuments to give it the grandeur of the romantic symbol.

Hansen was one of the restorers of the Temple of Athena Nike, which was demolished during the Turkish siege of the Acropolis. The material was already there, and the renovation became reality. Theophilus, ten years younger than Christian, designed the Academy, the Observatory, the Palace Demetriou, and then Hotel Grande Bretagne. However, he was most distinguished in Vienna, where he held the biggest influence on architecture of the city.

"The building was originally constructed in 1834–1835 to become a commercial center along the lines of the European commercial centers," said Stefanos Pantos, the architect who undertook the renovation of the building. "The plan, however, neglected that the building was abandoned from 1835 until 1852."

In 1852, the building was purchased by an Austrian company, to become the first steam silk plant, but never went into operation due to bankruptcy. In 1854 the building functioned as a Hospital while in that same year the company Siriki Greece was founded – to work as Metaxourgeio from 1855 until 1875 – becoming the largest unit in the Balkans and the largest in Greece. In 1875, the introduction of silk imports from China forced the operation to close down despite the efforts of A. Douroutis to sustain the business.

Between 1892 and 1904, the opening of streets Germanikou and Giatrakou caused the destruction of the street facing part of the building and the northeastern section. In the same period, shops on the ground floor and residential homes on the first floor were inhabited and in 1960 the northeastern part reconstructed.

In 1944 the building was used as a garrison headquarters of ELAS, between 1960 and 1993 a number of shops and residences were abandoned after a fire in 1960. In 1993, the grandson of the owner, also named Douroutis, decided to donate the building to the City of Athens.
