= The Other Human =

Greek social solidarity initiative

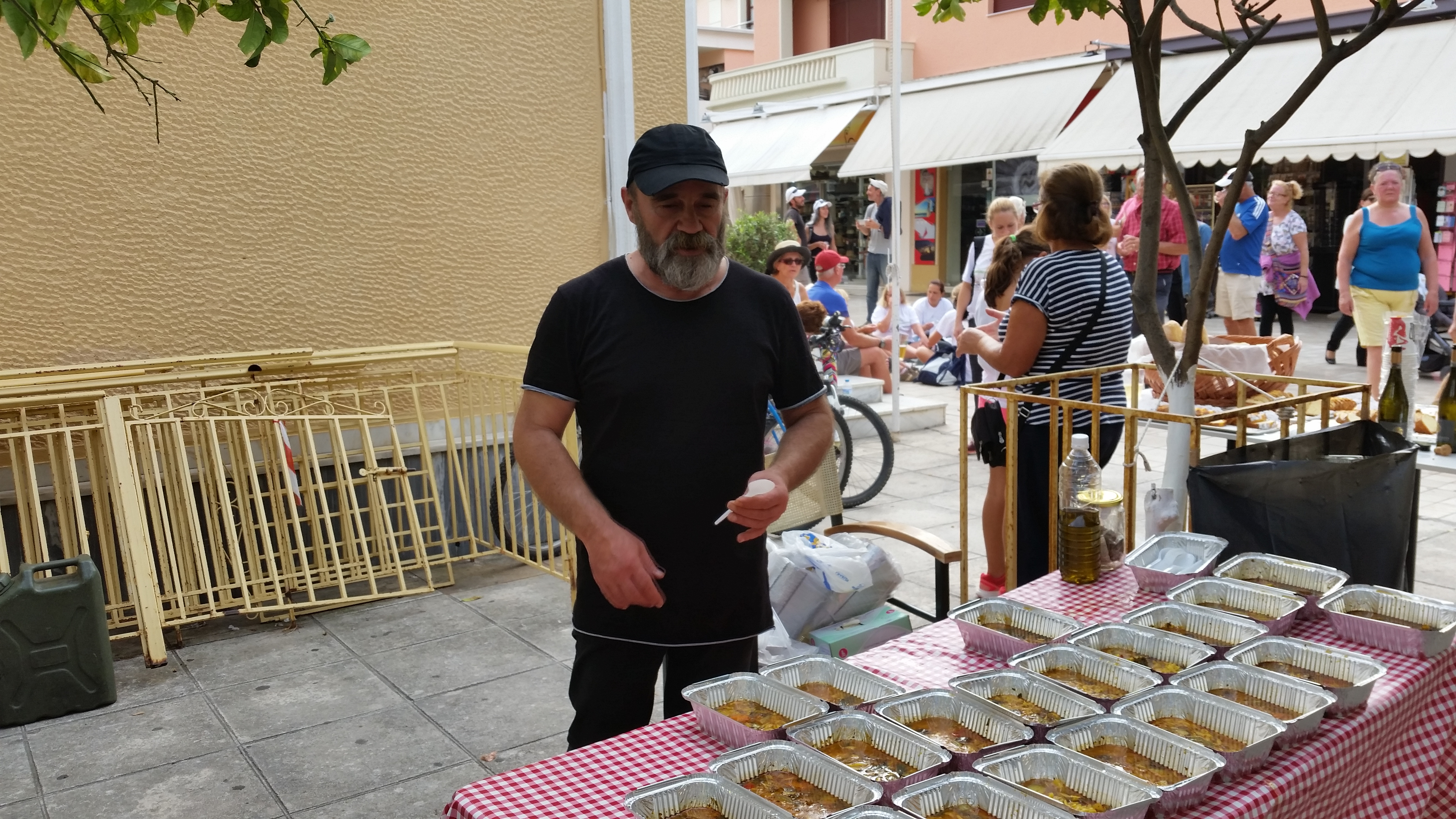
"The other human" Konstantinos Polychronopoulos in Argostoli, Kefalonia. Part of the income of the initiative "Kefalonia Big Walk 2016" were given to "Social Kitchen".

"The Other Human" is a social solidarity initiative created in Athens in 2011 by Konstantinos Polychronopoulos. It cooks food in public places covering the needs of 3,000 people every day in Athens. The initiative has expanded in other cities of Greece and has received support by similar groups in other countries. From 2015 onward an area of 230 square meters operates in Metaxourgeio as a food warehouse and a place where everybody can come to eat food, take a shower, rest and drink water or coffee for free. Polychronopoulos, the creator of the initiative, separates its work from charity, stating that in order to accept an offer, the person who wants to make the donation must participate in the action, eating from the same cauldron as everyone.

== Development of the idea ==
Konstantinos Polychronopoulos had been an executive of a multinational company in the field of advertising and marketing for many years before being fired in September 2009 and forced to return to his hometown. In December 2011, after 2 years of unsuccessfully searching for a job, he noticed two children fighting over vegetables in the waste bin of the public market and decided to take action. He made ten toasts and went to the public market to distribute them to people who were looking for food in the garbage. The crowd did not respond at first, until he started eating one of the toasts himself. After that, people began to overcome their inhibitions and came over to get toasts and eat them with Konstantinos. He then went to the street and put his studies (marketing) in action: he asked the vendors to contribute raw material from their stall and started cooking on the street and eating with the people. This is how the idea of the "social kitchen" began.

== Recognition ==
In 2015, Konstantinos Polychronopoulos was declared "European Citizen of the Year" by the European Parliament, but he refused to accept the award stating that he "would accept an award from the Europe of solidarity and culture but not from the Europe of cannibalism".

== The house of the "Other Human" ==
The house of the "Other Human" is located at 122 Megalou Alexandrou and 28 Artemisiou street in Metaxourgeio. In addition to storage, the space is open to anyone who needs to take a bath, have breakfast or drink a coffee. It is also offered for rehearsals in the theater group "The Other Human" and for remedial teaching to students with the help of volunteer teachers.
