= Alexandros Kontostavlos =

Greek banker, magnate, and politician (1789–1865)

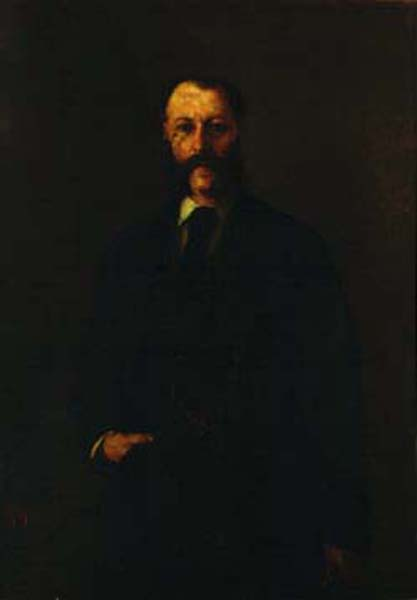
Alexandros Kontostavlos by Georgios Jakobides.

Alexandros Kontostavlos (Greek: Αλέξανδρος Κοντόσταυλος; c. 1789, Chios – 1865, Athens) was a Greek banker, magnate and politician.

== Biography ==
Konstavlos was born on the island of Chios in about 1789 and descended from a noble family that traced its origins to the Byzantine Empire. After studies in Italy, he became a member of the Filiki Etaireia and during the latter part of the Greek Revolution served as an envoy to the United States for the purchase of warships.

In 1828, Governor Ioannis Kapodistrias named him a member of the financial committee and sent him to Malta, where he purchased the mint that was used to produce the first modern Greek currency, the phoenix.

Under King Otto of Greece, he was elected several times to Parliament for Karystos, and served as Minister of Finance from 5 October 1855 until 2 July 1856. From December 1856 to July 1856, he was Speaker of the Hellenic Parliament.

His home was the site of the Old Parliament House, Athens, now the National Historical Museum.

He died in Athens in 1865. His son, Alexandros A. Kontostavlos, was a diplomat and politician.
