= Old Parliament House, Athens =

Coordinates: 37°58′39″N 23°43′58″E

Old Parliament House
- Παλαιά Βουλή
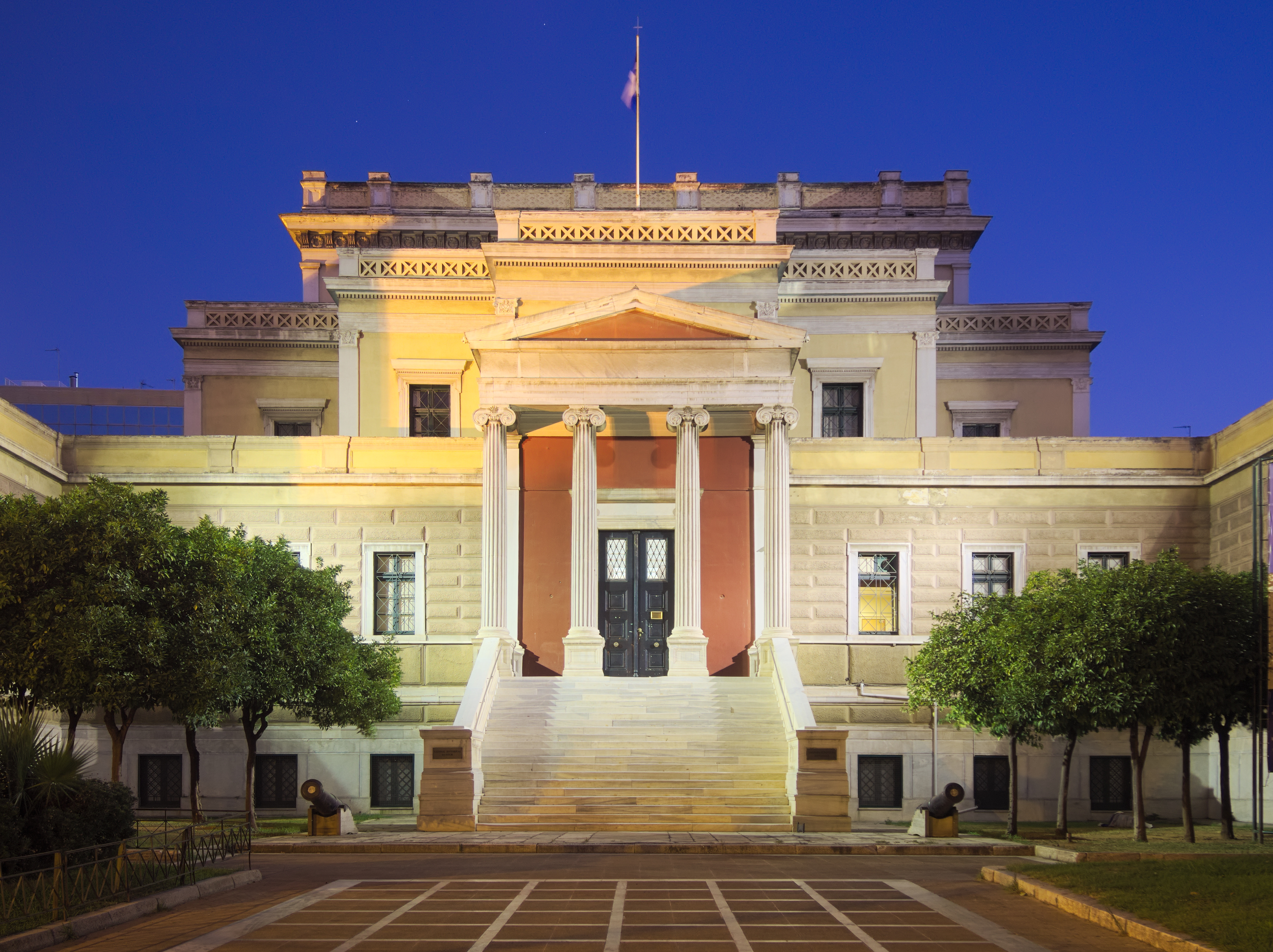
- Main entrance

General information
- Architectural style: Neoclassical
- Location: Athens, Greece
- Current tenants: National Historical Museum of Greece
- Construction started: 15 August 1858
- Inaugurated: 11 August 1875
- Client: Hellenic Parliament

Design and construction
- Architects: François Louis Florimond Boulanger; Panagis Kalkos

Website
- www.nhmuseum.gr

References
- "Το Κτήριο της Βουλής των Ελλήνων" [The Building of the Hellenic Parliament] (PDF).

The Old Parliament House (Greek: Παλαιά Βουλή, romanized: Paleá Voulí) at Stadiou Street in Athens, housed the Greek Parliament between 1875 and 1935. It now houses the country's National Historical Museum.

== History ==
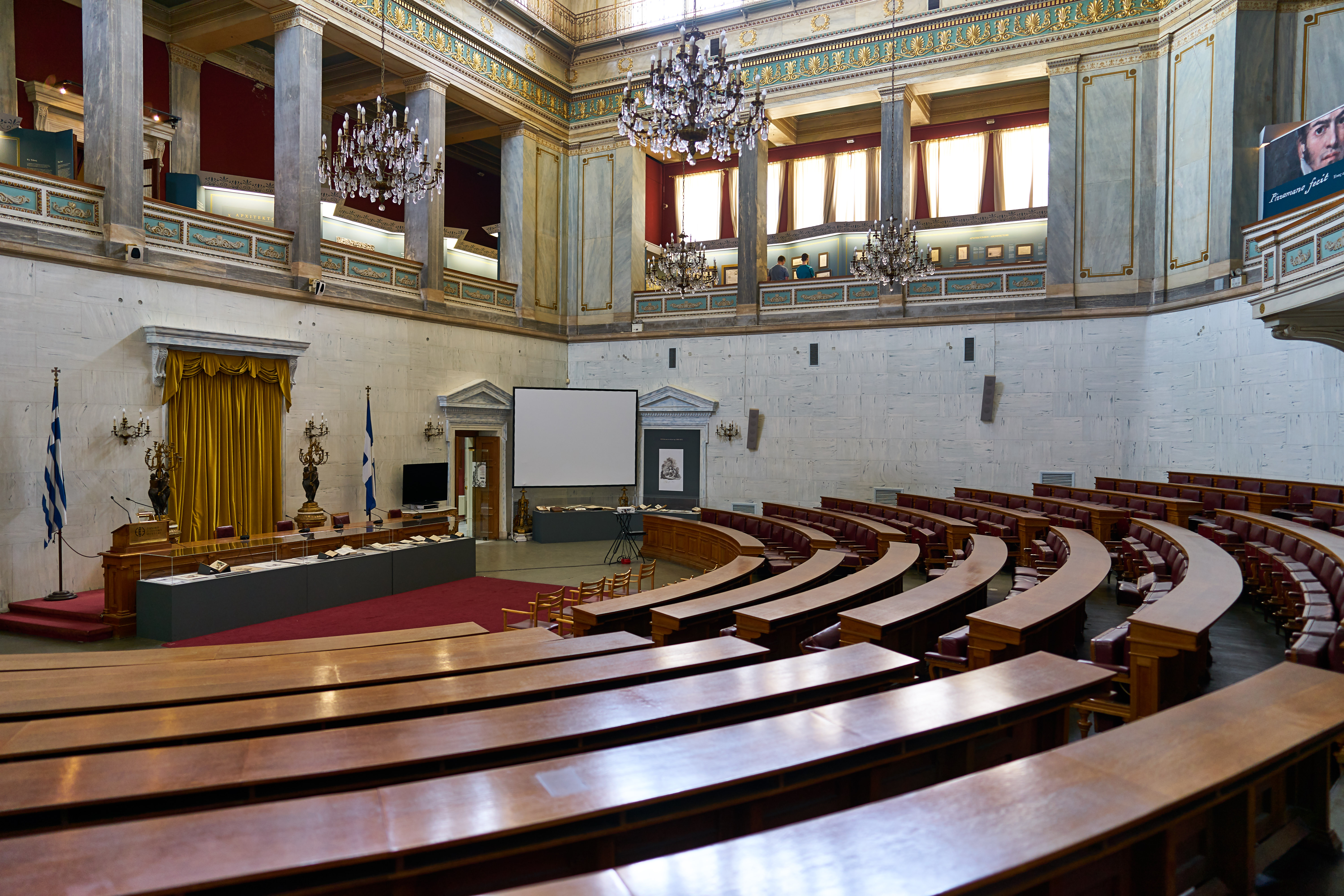
Interior

The site was occupied originally by the house of the Athenian magnate and politician Alexandros Kontostavlos. After Athens became the capital of Greece in 1833, King Otto selected it as temporary residence, pending the construction of the Royal Palace (which houses Parliament currently). In 1835, a large dance and banquet hall was added to the house, and after the 1843 Revolution, which forced King Otto to grant a constitution, the National Assembly convened here. In October 1854, however, the house burned down in a fire. Construction of a new building then began in August 1858, with the foundation laid by Queen Amalia, on plans by the French architect François Boulanger. Construction was halted the next year owing to lack of funds, and not restarted until after Otto was deposed in 1863; the plans were then modified by the Greek architect Panagiotis Kalkos, and construction was complete by 1871. During the interim, Parliament had been housed on the back of the square in a brick building, hastily erected in 1863, which became colloquially known as "the Shanty" (η Παράγκα).

The Hellenic Parliament would remain in the building from 1875 until 1935, when it was moved to its current location in the Old Palace. As such, it witnessed some of the most turbulent and important events in modern Greek history, including the assassination of Prime Minister Theodoros Deligiannis on the Parliament steps on 13 June 1905, and the declaration of the Republic on 25 March 1924. After the parliament was moved to its current house in 1929, the building housed the Ministry of Justice. In 1961 the building underwent extensive restoration and became the seat of the National History Museum, administered by the Historical and Ethnological Society of Greece.

== Kolokotronis statue ==
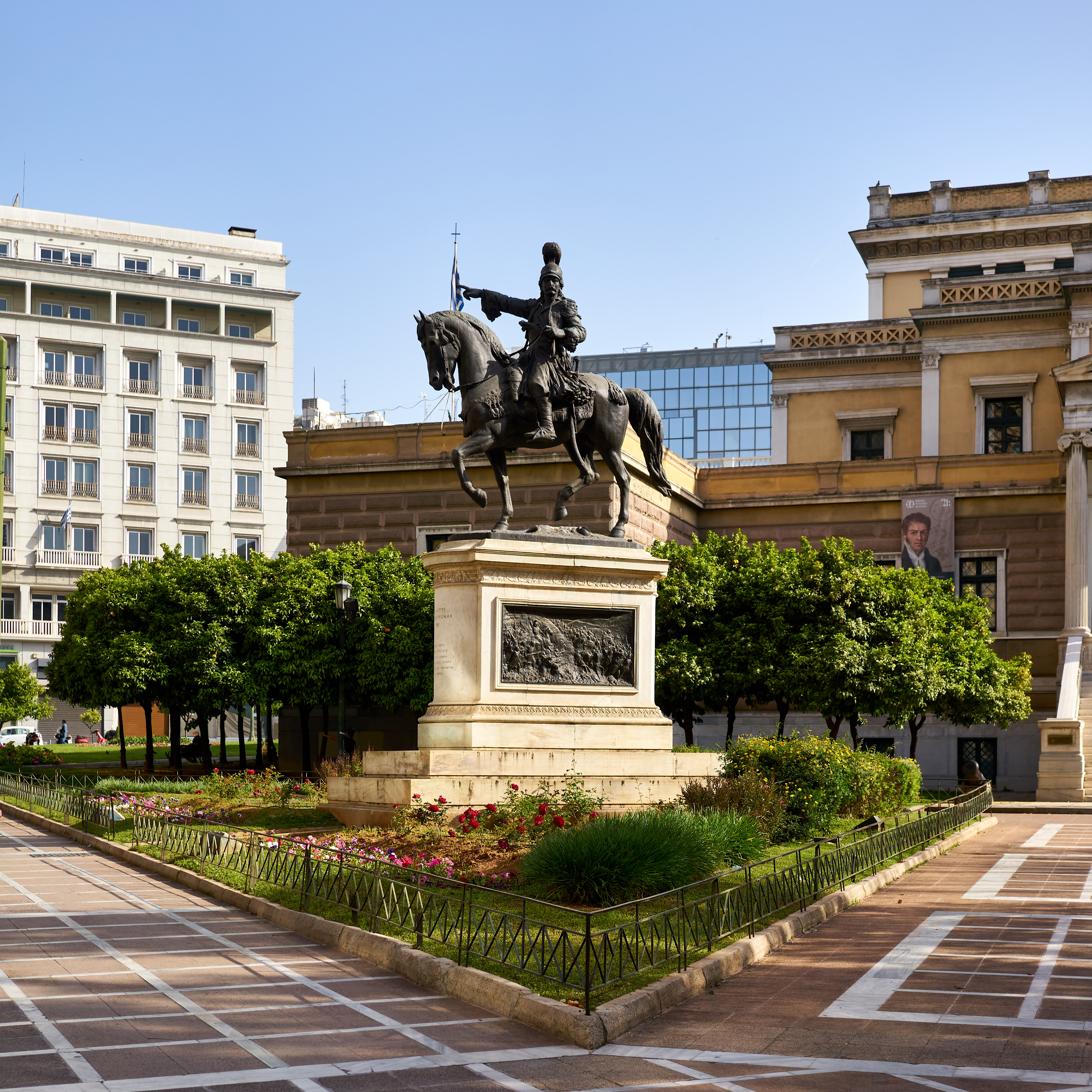
Bronze statue of Theodoros Kolokotronis, by sculptor Lazaros Sochos, in front of the Parliament House

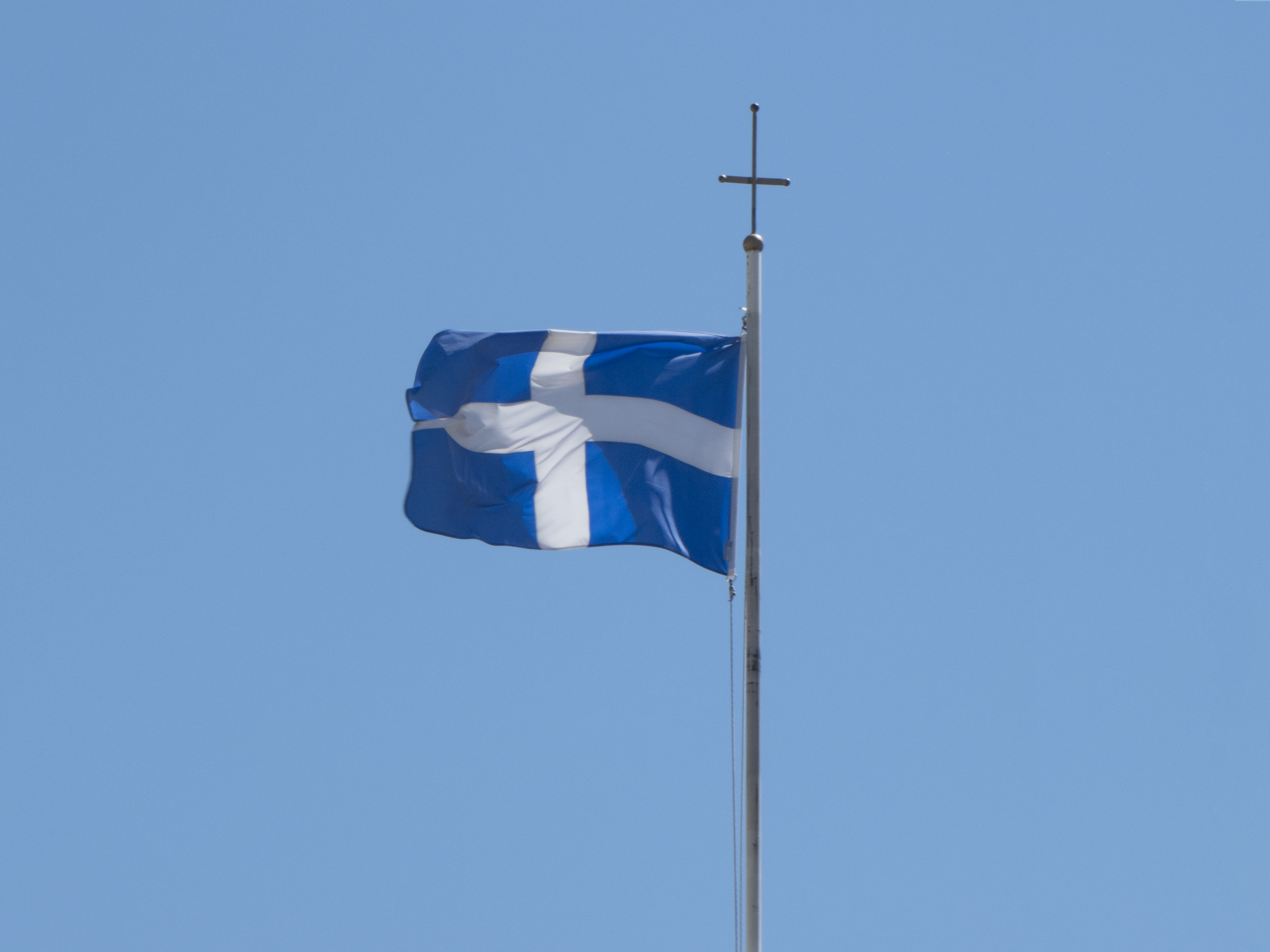
The old land flag of Greece flying over the Parliament

In front of the building stands a large bronze equestrian statue of General Theodoros Kolokotronis. The bronze statue of the commander in chief of the Revolution of 1821 is a work of sculptor Lazaros Sochos (1862–1911), and was originally placed (1904) at the beginning of Kolokotronis street. It was transferred to its current location in 1954, during the restoration of the Old Parliament Building, to signal the link of the museum with the city. Its pedestal features bronze reliefs of the Battle of Dervenakia, and of a session of the Peloponnesian Senate during the Greek Revolution. The statue faces Stadiou Street; Kolokotronis turns his head towards the Parliament House and his hand is pointing the opposite way where, during the 19th century, the Royal Mews were located. According to a popular joke, the hero of the Revolution was showing parliamentarians that, because of their subservience to the King, the stables were their rightful place.

== The National Historical Museum ==
The museum houses the collection of the Historical and Ethnological Society of Greece (IEEE), founded in 1882. It is the oldest collection of its kind in Greece, and prior to its transfer to the Old Parliament, was housed in the main building of the National Technical University.

The collection contains historical items concerning the period from the capture of Constantinopolis by the Ottomans in 1453 to the Second World War, emphasizing especially the period of the Greek Revolution and the subsequent establishment of the modern Greek state. Among the items displayed are weapons, personal belongings and memorabilia from historical personalities, historical paintings by Greek and foreign artists, manuscripts, as well as a large collection of traditional costumes from the various regions of Greece. The collection is displayed in the corridors and rooms of the building, while the great central hall of the National Assembly is used for conferences.
