= Lazaros Sochos =

Greek sculptor (1862–1911)

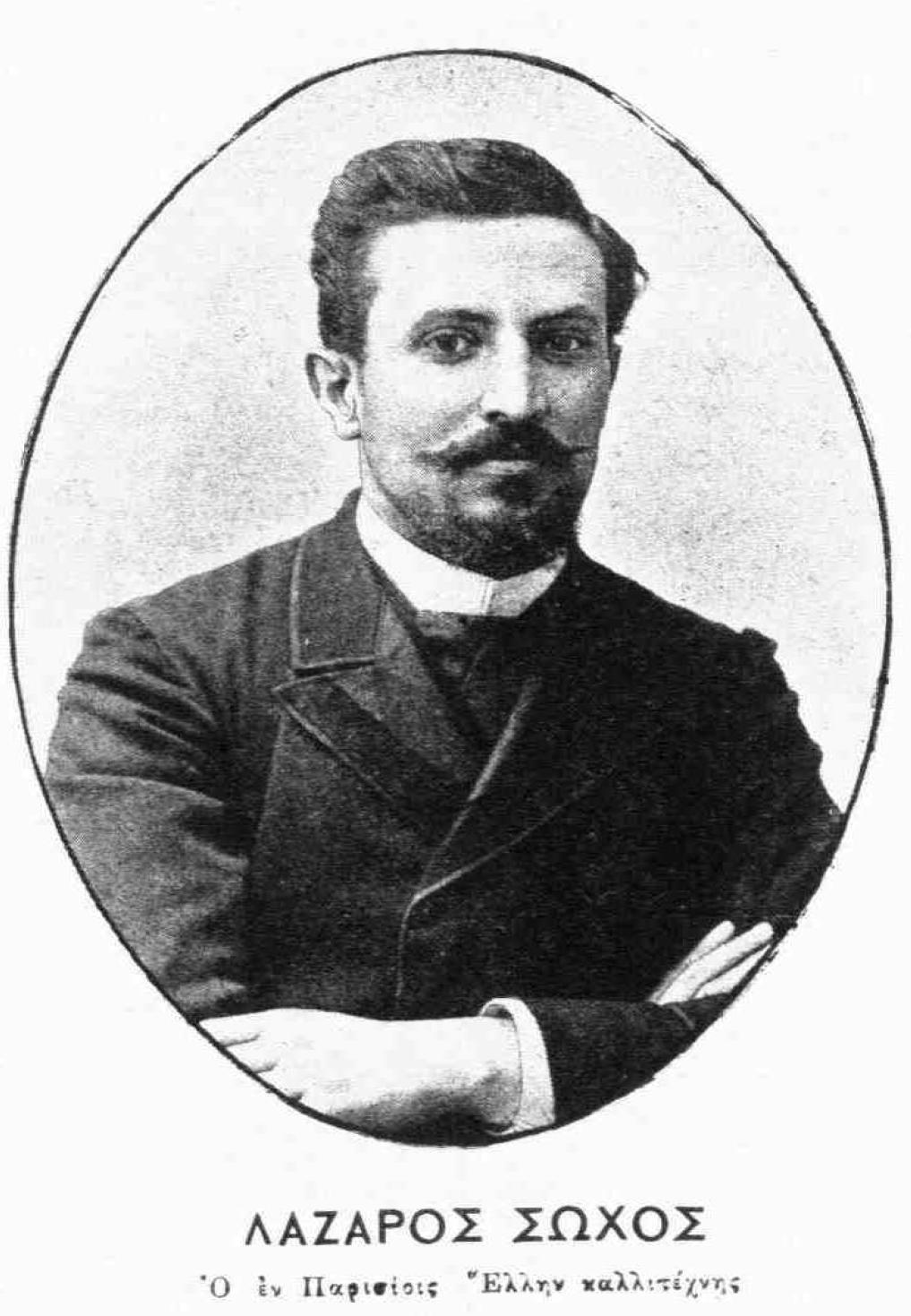
Lazaros Sochos

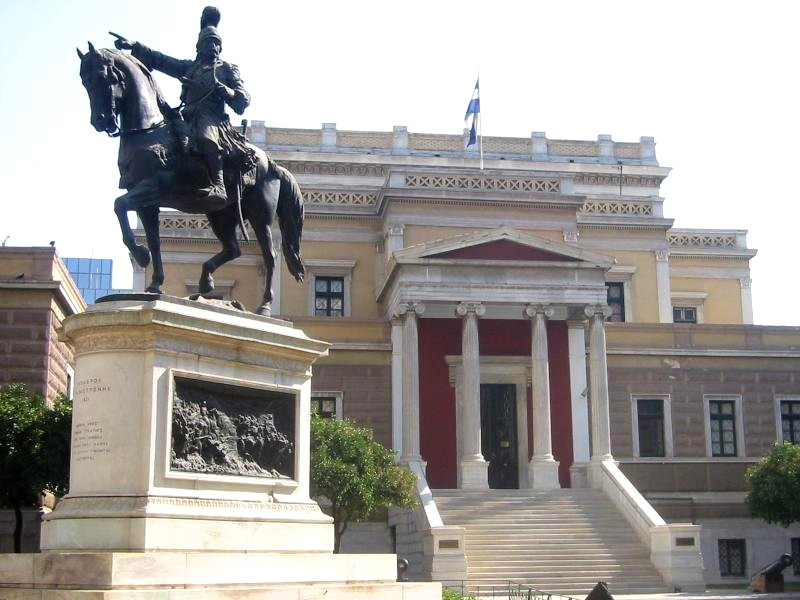
Kolokotronis' statue.

Lazaros Sochos (Greek: Λάζαρος Σώχος; 1862–1911) was a Greek sculptor. He was born in Tinos and educated in Athens under Leonidas Drosis. He later studied also in Paris.

He is best known for the statue of Theodoros Kolokotronis in front of the Old Parliament House, Athens.

== Gallery ==
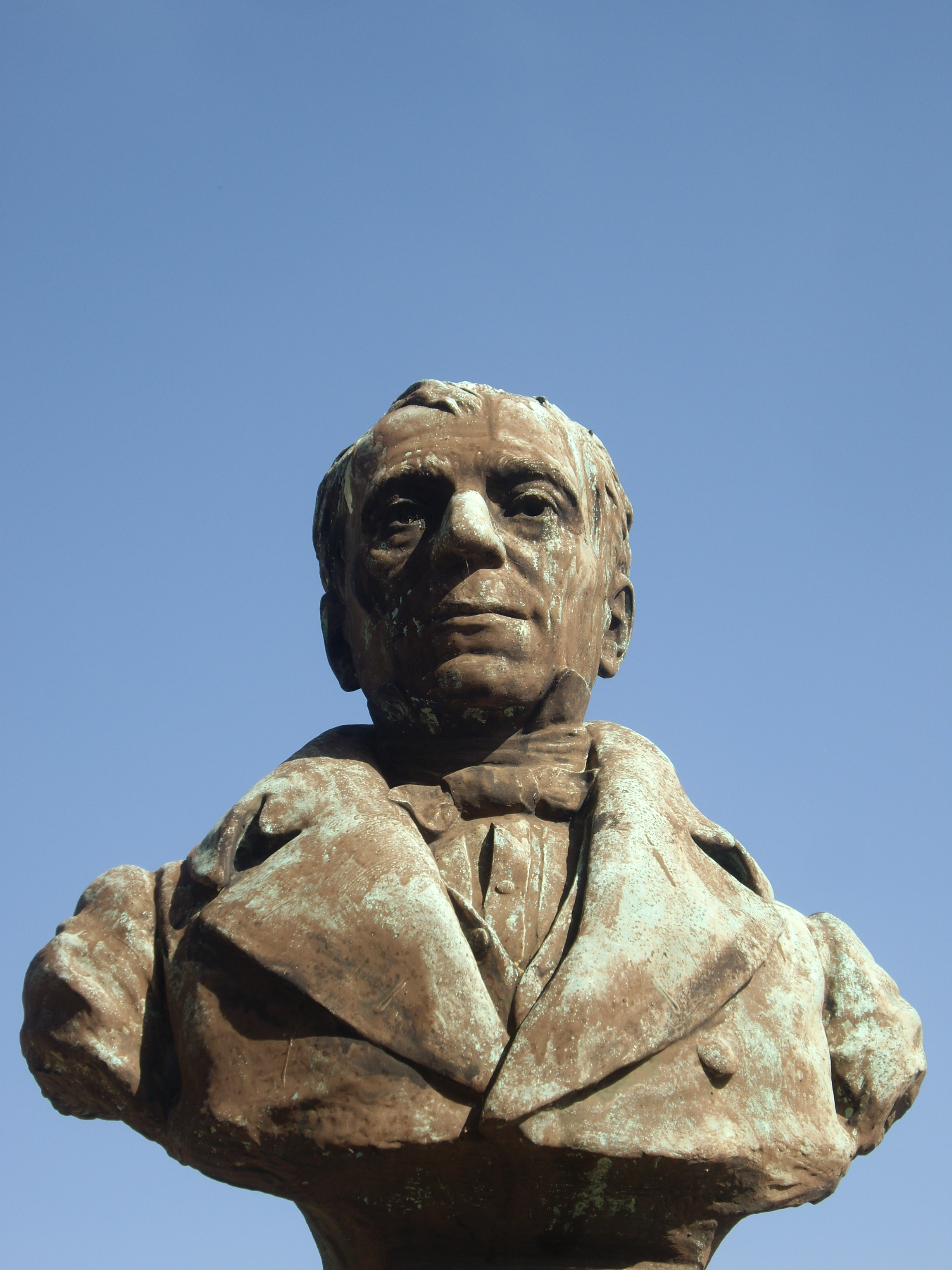
Adamantios Korais

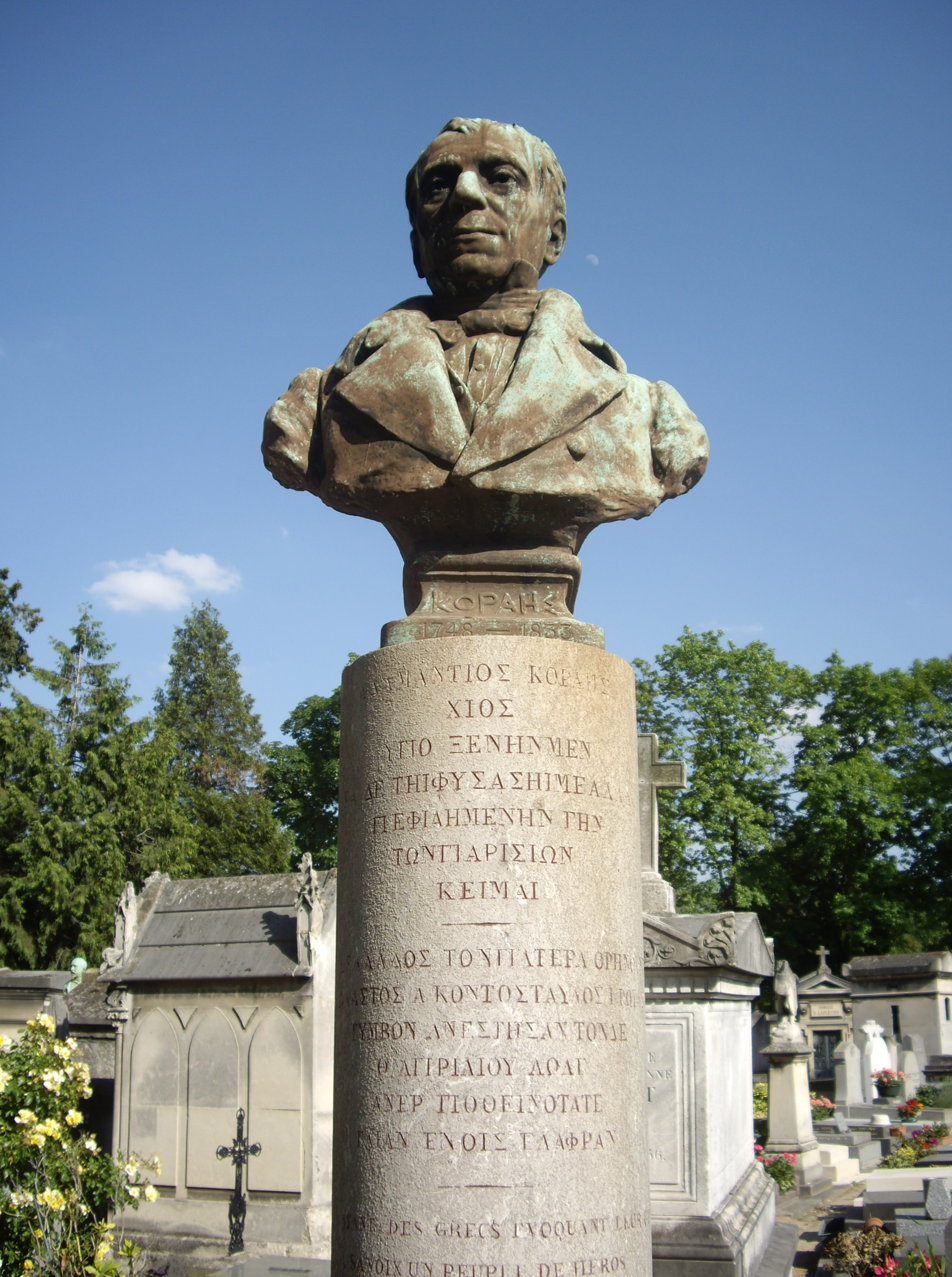
Adamantios Korais

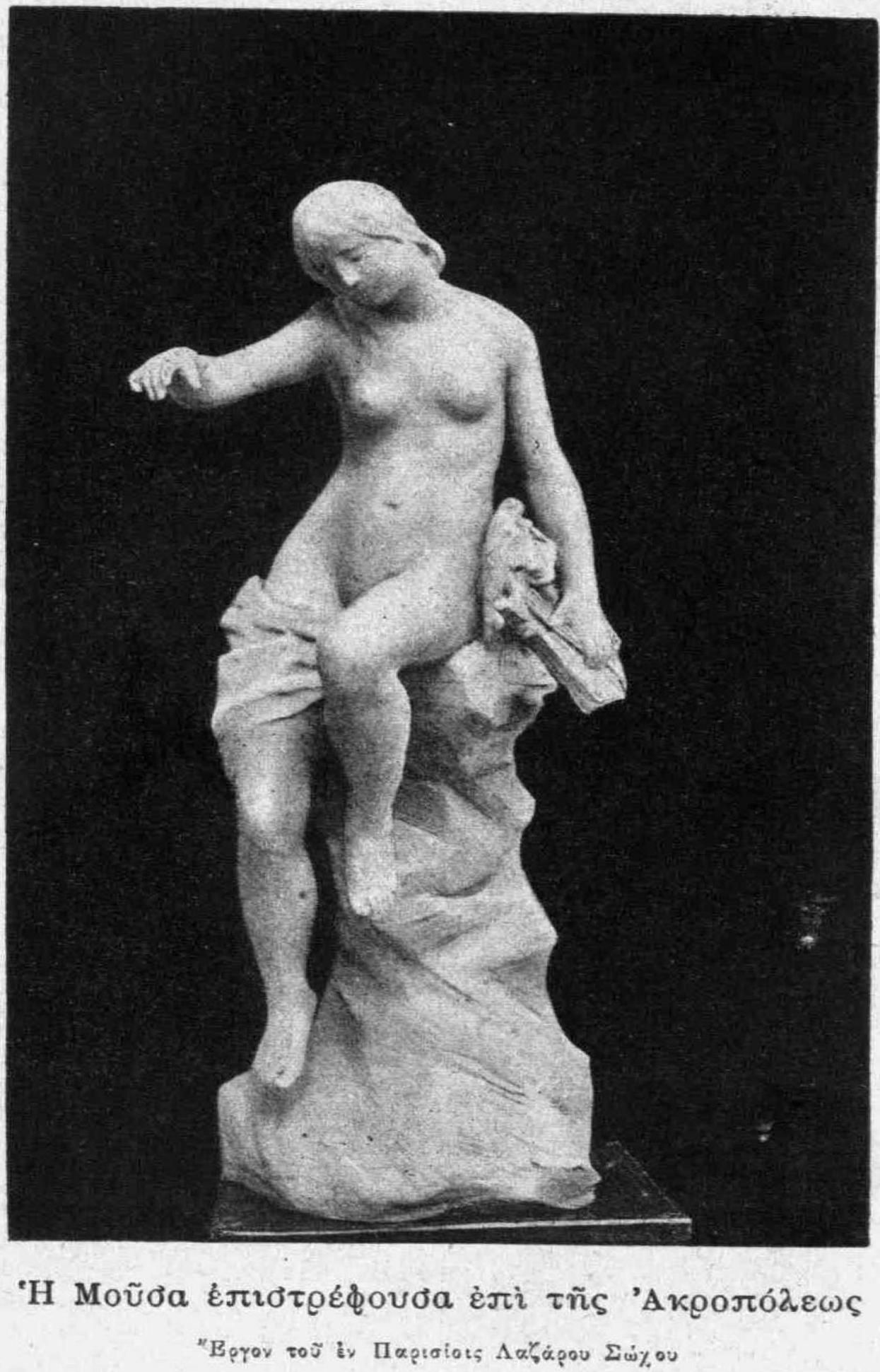
Woman

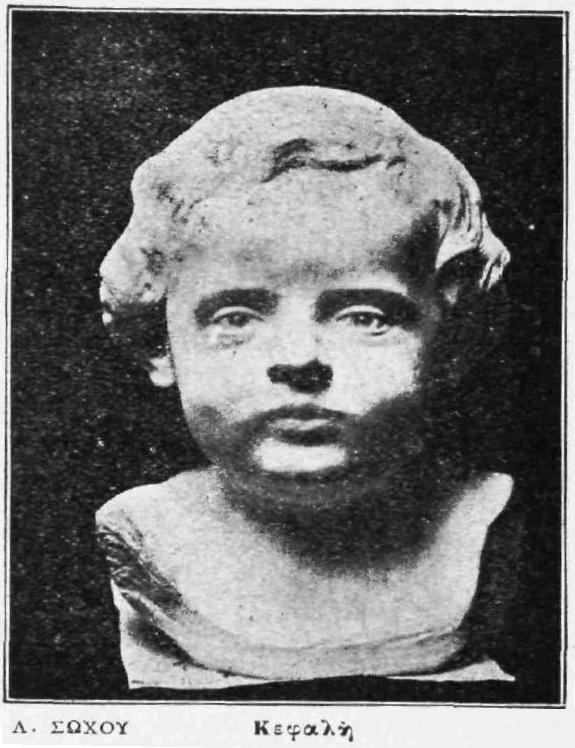
Child Head
