= Avdi Square =

Square in Athens, Greece

Coordinates: 37.98429°N 23.72056°E

Avdi Square (Greek: Πλατεία Λέοντος Αυδή) is a public gathering place located in the Metaxourgeio neighbourhood of Athens, Greece, bounded by Leonidou, Kerameikou, Giatrakou and Germanikou streets. On the edges of the square stand the Municipal Gallery of Athens, several cafes, theatres, businesses and residential buildings. The City of Athens renovated the square in 2008, increasing the amount and quality of greenery, improving lighting and renewing tile surfaces. Since then, the square has also begun to bear signs of the neighbourhood’s steady revitalization by its residents through anonymous artwork, guerrilla gardening, festivals, and performances of dance, music and other artistic expression.

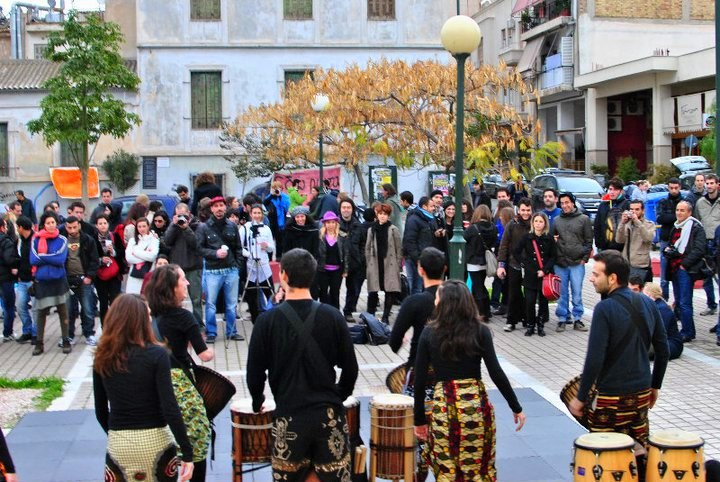
A drum and dance troupe performs during a Lunch Street Party in the square.

The square’s 2008 overhaul was part of the city’s “We're Taking Note and Taking Action" program, which aimed to solve everyday problems in Athens' neighbourhoods. In Avdi Square, the city added 39 trees, 112 bushes, 500 flowers, 1,000 square metres of grass, and 271 square metres of new tile surface. On 21 July 2008, following the completion of the renovation, Mayor Nikitas Kaklamanis held a public ceremony to hand over the square to the area's citizens for caretaking and use as a recreational oasis. "This square will become the heart of culture and recreation in your neighbourhood,” he said during the launch of the revamped space.

The square is named for Leon Avdis (1937–2000), a Greek lawyer and public servant who enjoyed wide respect across the political spectrum. In 1994 he was elected Municipal Councillor of Athens as head of the "Fighting Cooperation for Athens" coalition. Avdis was elected to Parliament in 1996 on the Greek Communist Party (KKE) ticket, then resigned in 1997 to run for mayor of Athens. His platform including improving living conditions in run-down areas and creating bicycle lanes in the capital.

== Photo gallery ==
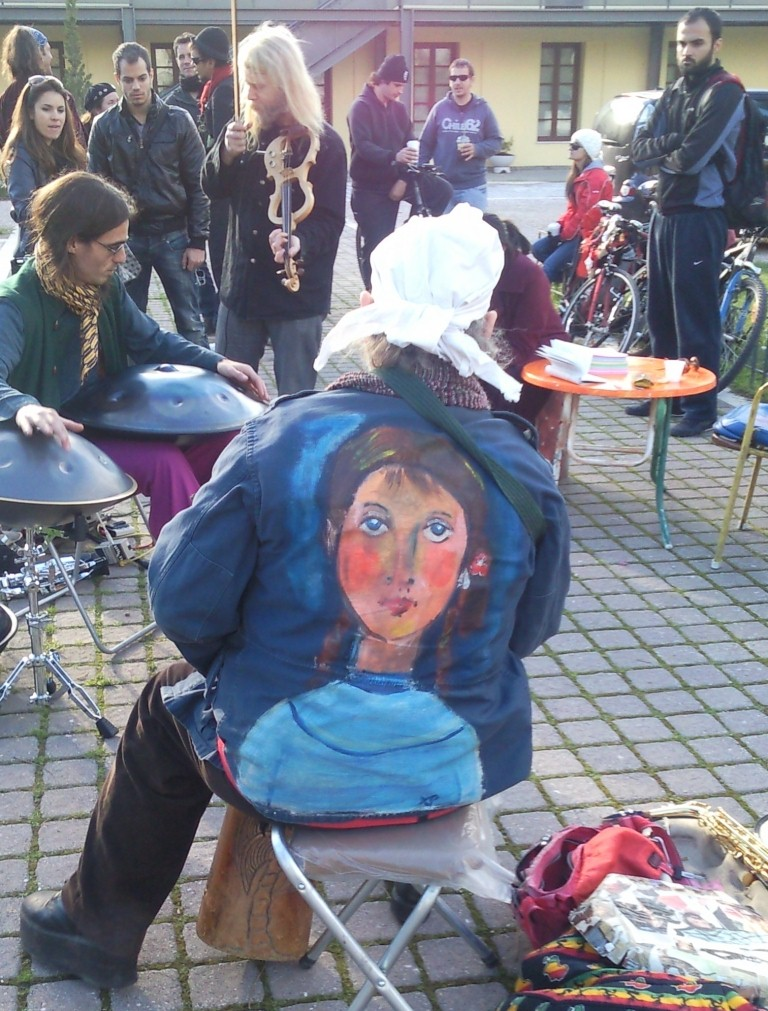
Lunch and street party

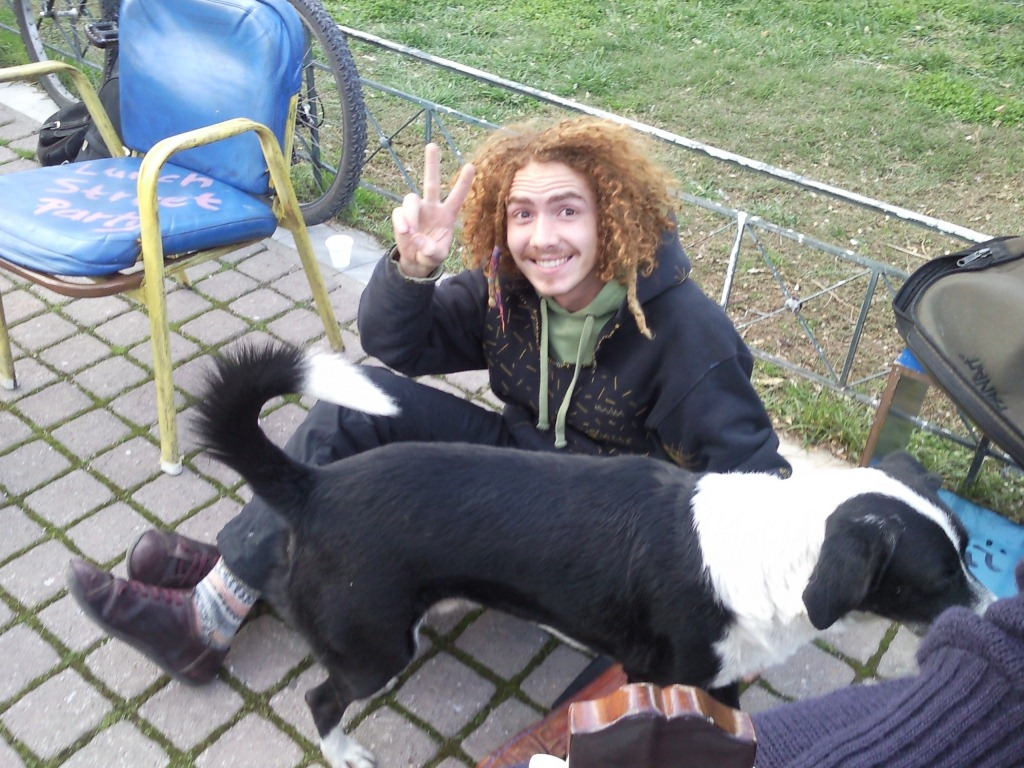
Lunch and street party

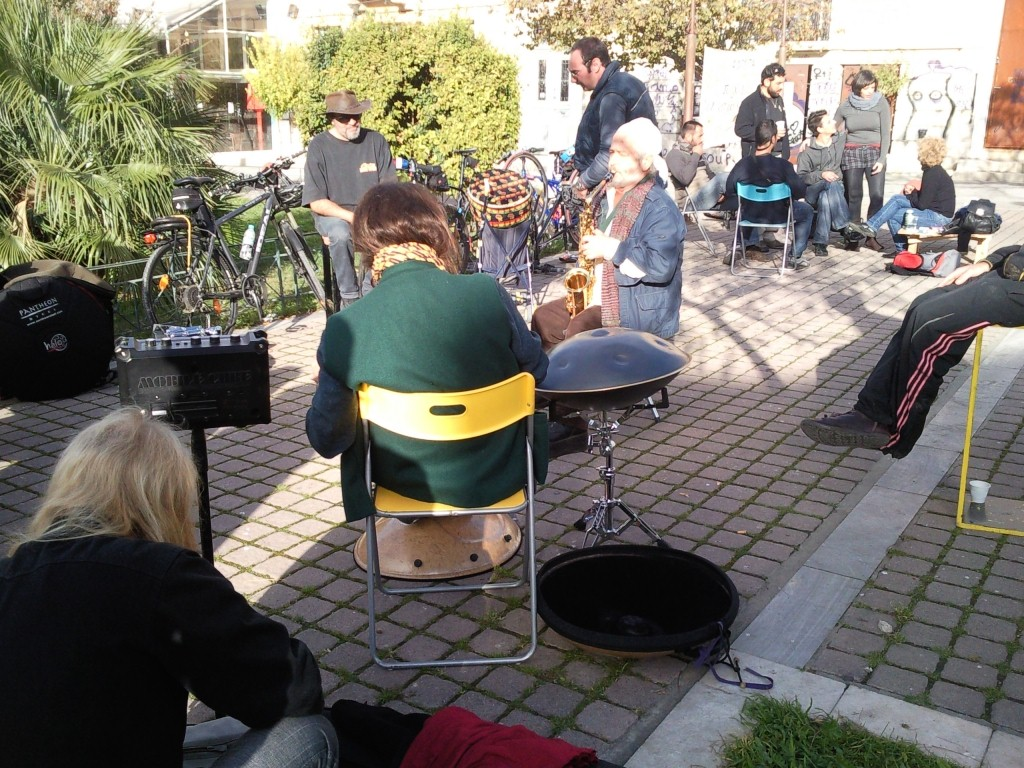
Lunch and street party

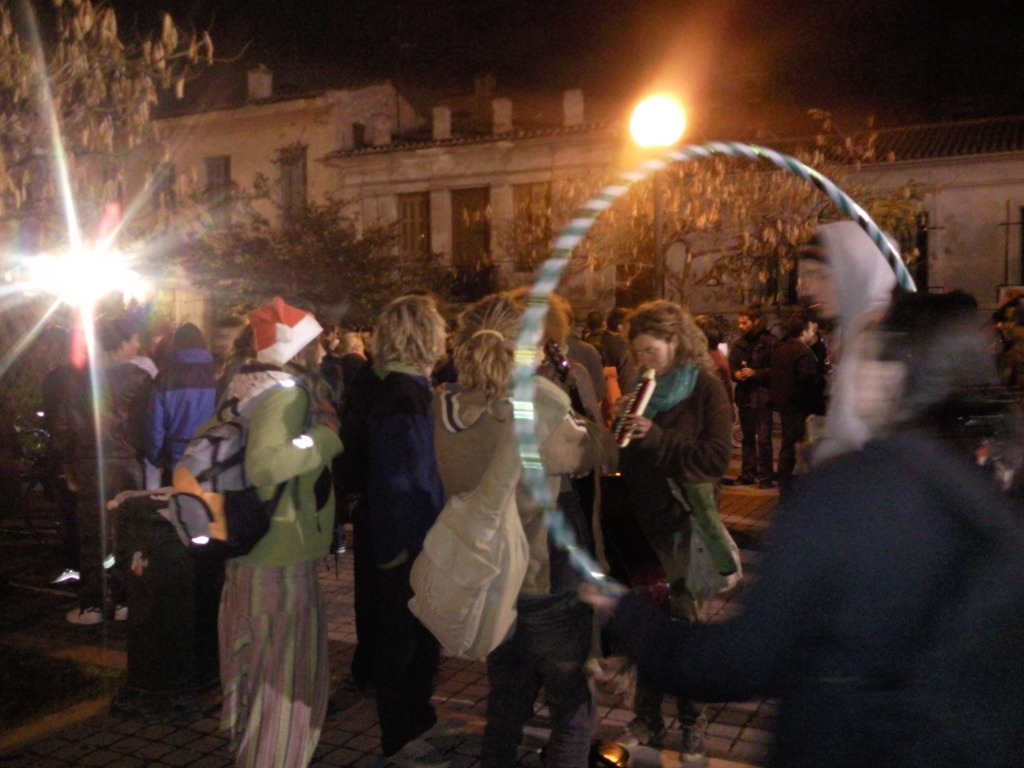
Festival

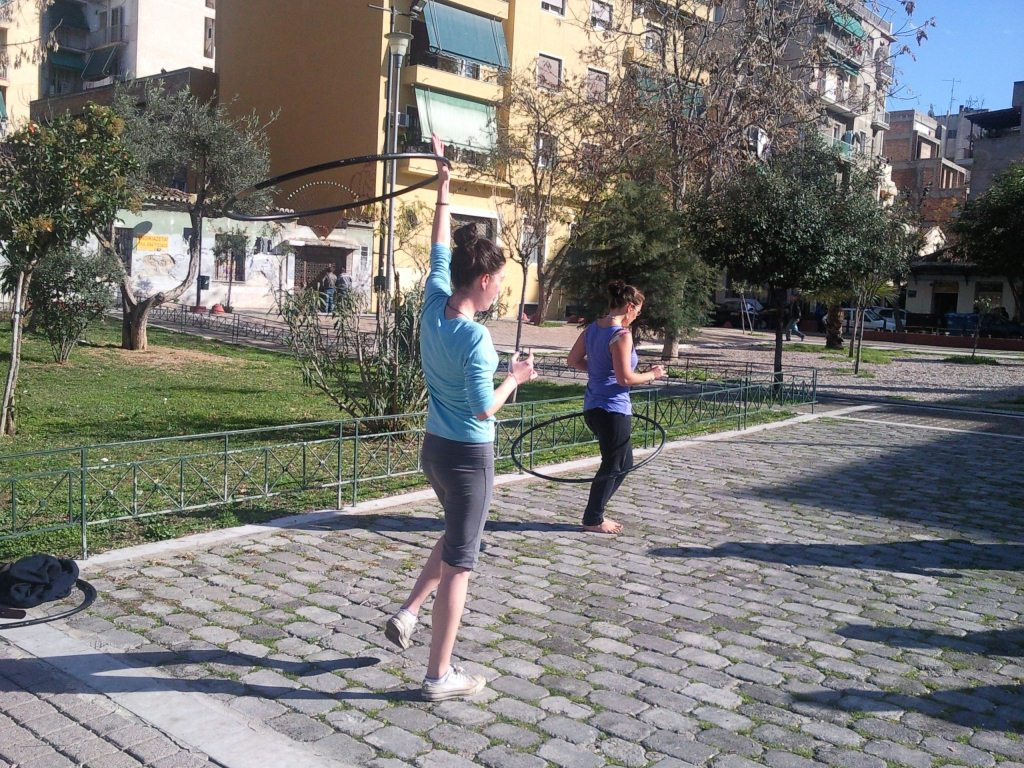
Hula hoopers

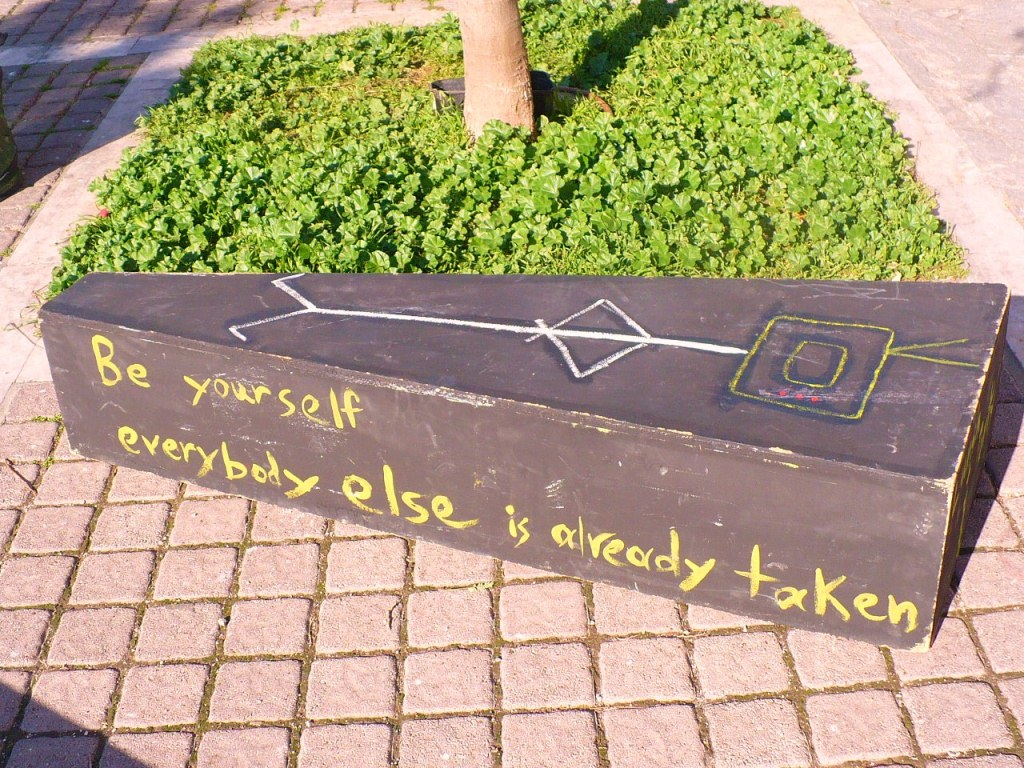
Artwork

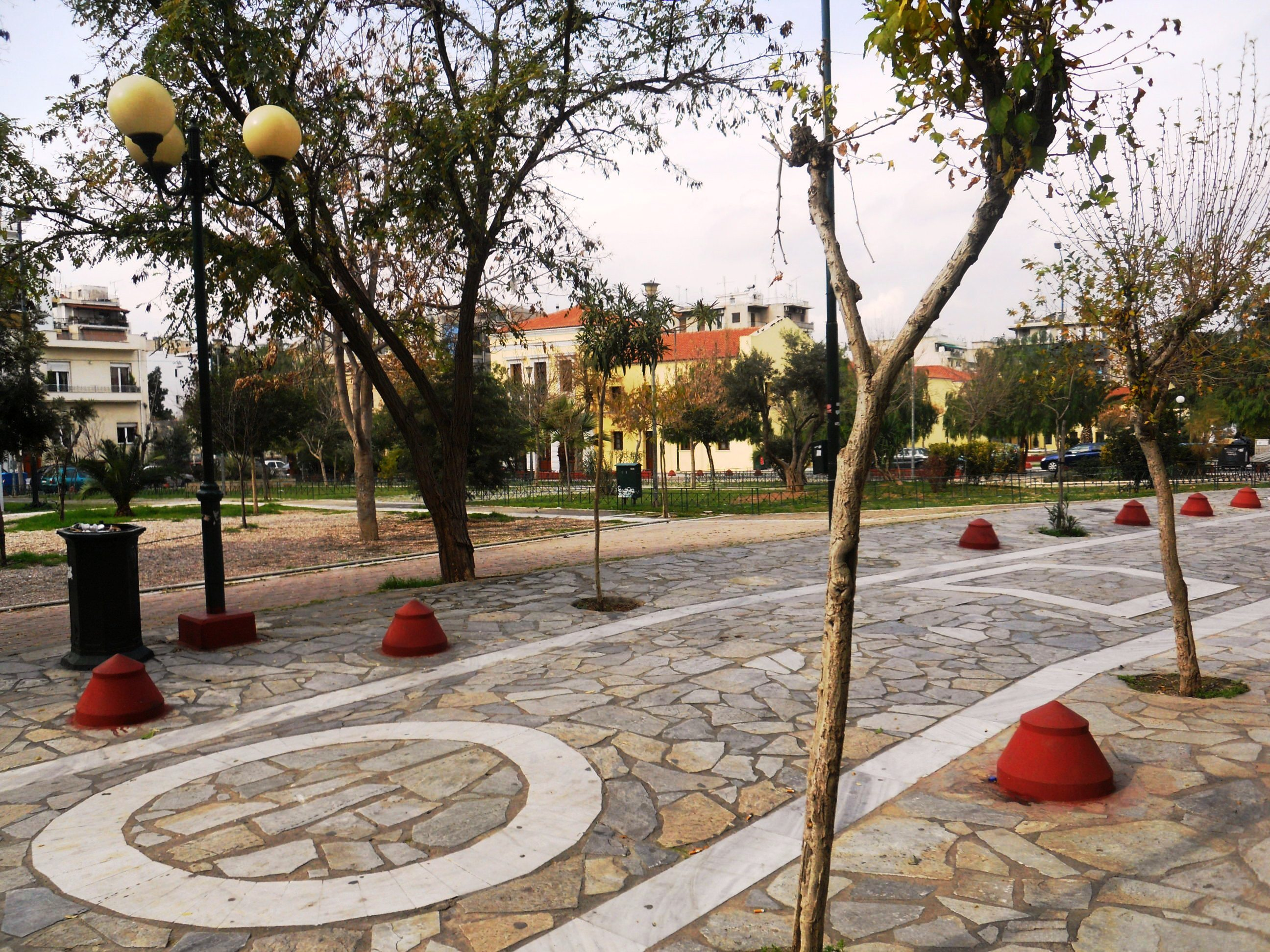
Tiled walkways
