= Old Royal Palace =

Coordinates: 37°58′31″N 23°44′13″E

- Παλαιά Ανάκτορα
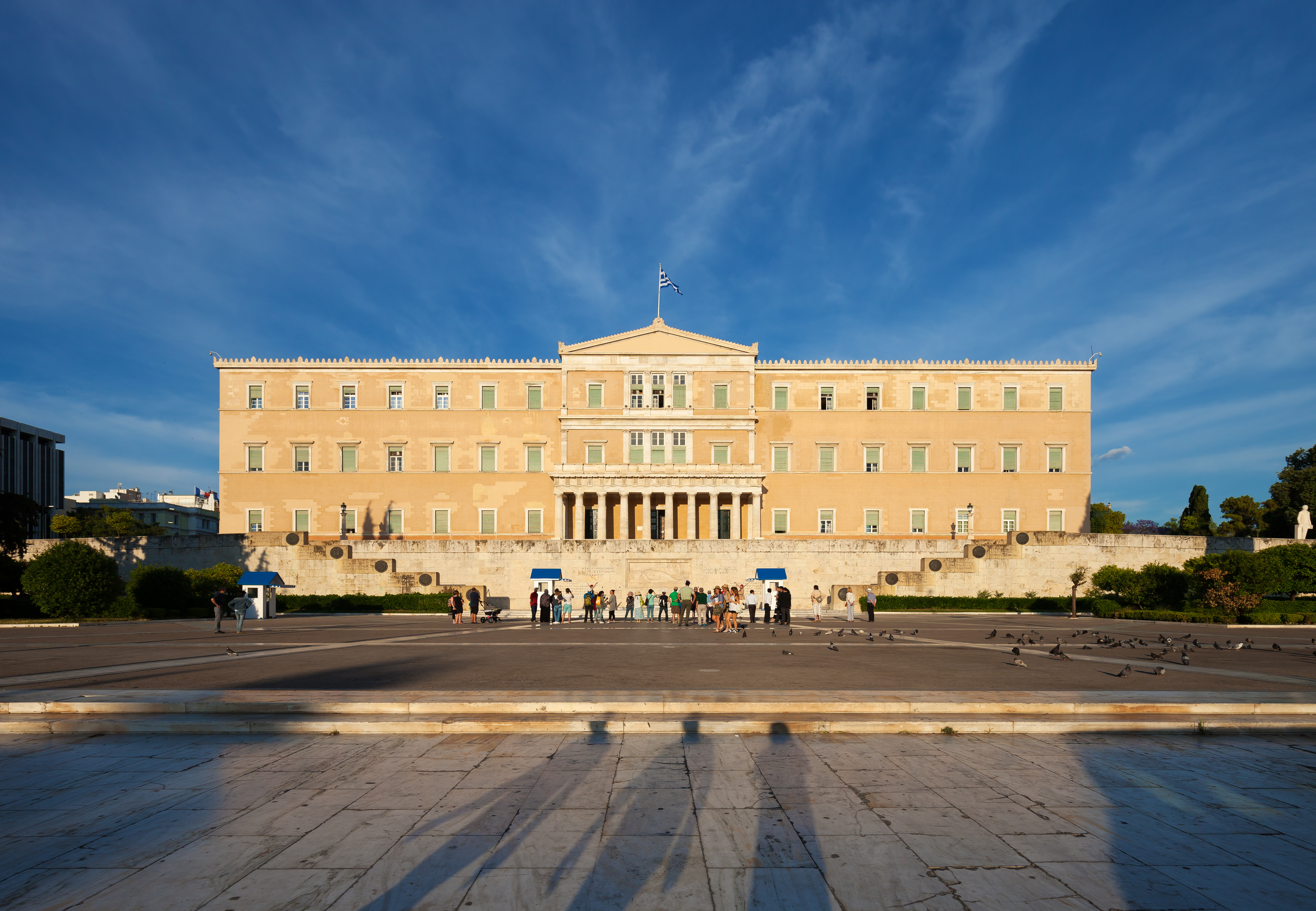
- A view from Vasilissis Amalias Avenue.

- Location within Athens

General information
- Architectural style: Greek Revival (a type of Neoclassicism)
- Location: Athens, Greece
- Current tenants: Hellenic Parliament
- Construction started: 1836
- Inaugurated: 1843; 183 years ago
- Client: Ludwig I of Bavaria
- Owner: Hellenic Republic

Design and construction
- Architect: Friedrich von Gärtner

Website
- www.hellenicparliament.gr

The Old Royal Palace (Greek: Παλαιά Ανάκτορα, romanized: Palaiá Anáktora) is the first royal palace of modern Greece. It is a neoclassical building situated at the heart of modern Athens, facing onto Syntagma Square. It was constructed between 1836 and 1843 to serve as the main residence of the Greek royal family and has been the seat of the Parliament since 1929.

In 1836, King Otto I commissioned the Bavarian architect Friedrich von Gärtner, recommended by his father, Ludwig I of Bavaria, to design a palace that would house not only the royal family but also the ministerial cabinet. At the same time, the architect planned the future National Garden adjacent to the palace with Queen Amélie. The building served as the official royal residence until 1910, when George I chose to move to the Crown Prince's Palace nearby, which now houses the presidency of the Hellenic Republic. On the west side of the building, the site was transformed into the Monument to the Unknown Soldier.

Today, the palace houses the Hellenic Parliament (Greek: Βουλή των Ελλήνων), the office of the President of the Assembly, the Vice Presidents, the Cabinet meeting room, the Parliament's television channel, and administrative services. It is accessible by public transportation via the bus and metro networks (Syntagma station).

== History ==
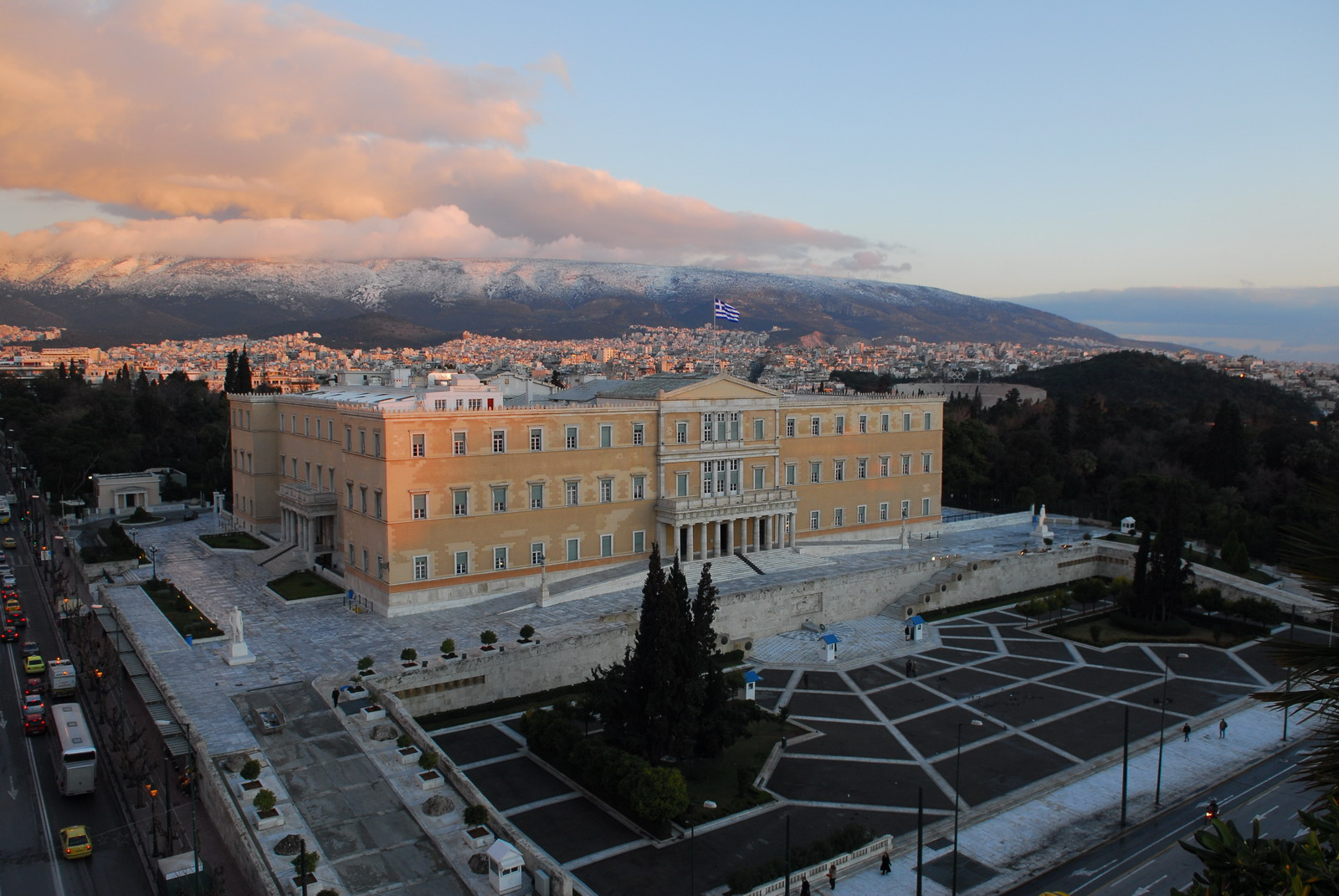
Aerial photograph of the Old Royal Palace from the Hotel Grande Bretagne

=== King Otto ===
The building was constructed between 1836 and 1847, intended to become the palace of King Otto, following the transfer of the state’s capital from Nafplio to Athens in 1834. It was erected at the expense of King Ludwig I of Bavaria, as a personal loan to Otto. The final selection of the site for the construction of the old palace was made by Gärtner himself at the end of 1835, after rejecting the proposals of Kleanthis, Schaubert, Klenze, and Schinkel, who had suggested locations in Omonoia, Kerameikos, and the Acropolis, respectively. Ludwig, Otto’s father, had also objected to the latter.

Specifically, the area proposed by Gärtner for the construction was at the junction of Stadiou Street (then a peripheral road) and Ermou Street, on a small and gentle hill. In addition to its healthy climate, the location overlooked Athens from its easternmost edge. Thus, Gärtner was instructed to draft the building’s plans, a task he accomplished in a short time during his brief stay in Athens (from December 1835 to March 1836), a feat made possible only by his considerable expertise.

The foundation of the building was laid on 25 January (Old Style) / 6 February (New Style), 1836, in the presence of Ludwig I and the ambassadors of the Great Powers. In March, Gärtner returned to Munich, leaving the supervision of the construction to Bavarian lieutenants Sloter and Hoss. From his office in Munich, Gärtner completed the detailed studies, producing a total of 247 designs related solely to the Athens palace building. These designs are now part of Munich’s large Moniger collection, while a small number have been donated to the Parliament Museum, demonstrating the care put into every detail.

The primary materials used in the building’s construction were stone, marble, and wood. The stone mainly came from Hymettus, Lycabettus, and the "Pinakota" area near Strefi Hill in Athens, while the marble came primarily from Penteli, with smaller quantities from Hymettus, Tinos, Paros, Naxos, and a few from Carrara and Genoa in Italy. Lastly, the wood was sourced from Evia. Notably, many locals, especially islanders such as those from Tinos, Sifnos, Paros, and Naxos]], volunteered to work on the palace’s construction without pay. Once the walls were completed in November 1840, Gärtner returned to Athens to oversee the continuation of the construction and the interior decoration, bringing with him renowned historical painters of the time, Johann Schraudolph, Ulrich Halbreiter, and Josef Kranzburger. These artists were responsible for the large murals depicting scenes from Greek mythology and the Greek Revolution of 1821, especially in the Trophy Hall. After a three-month stay, Gärtner returned to Munich, leaving the engineer Riedel in charge, who successfully completed the building in 1847.

King Otto and Queen Amélie moved into the royal palace in 1843. On 3 September of the same year, General Dimitrios Kallergis, with his men and a large part of the population, presented themselves at the windows of the sovereign to compel him to grant a constitution to the Kingdom. This peaceful revolution made the building a symbol of Greece’s political power. The square to the west of the palace was named "Constitution Square" (Πλατεία Συντάγματος, Syntagma Square) in honor of this event.

=== King George I and his successors ===
After Otto’s abrupt departure and abdication, George I became the new King of Greece in 1864. He moved into the palace with his family but decided in 1868 to relocate the heir apparent, known as the Diadoch, to another building. For this purpose, he had the Crown Prince's Palace constructed. At the same time, George I had two summer residences built: the Tatoi Palace, about twenty kilometers north of Athens, and the Mon Repos villa on the island of Corfu.

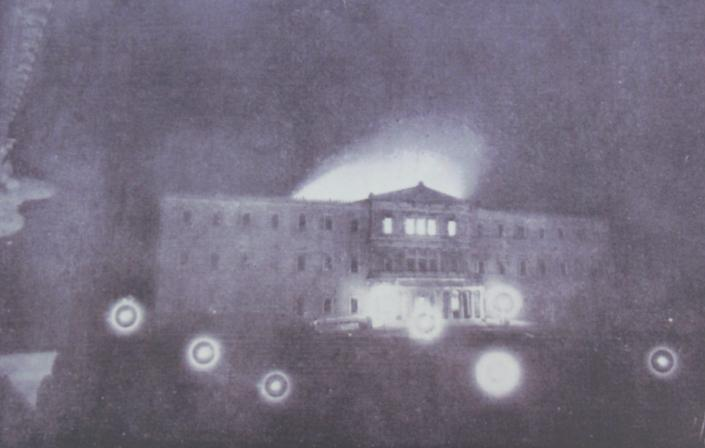
The Royal Palace the year of the 1909 fire

The royal palace was devastated by a terrible fire in 1909. The king and his family then moved to the Crown Prince's palace, from then on known as the "New Palace". Even after the reconstruction, George did not immediately return to the palace, unlike his wife, Queen Olga, who remained there after her husband’s assassination in 1913. Constantine I neglected the palace, and his successor, Alexander, chose to reside at Tatoi.

In 1924, a referendum abolished the monarchy, and the Second Hellenic Republic was proclaimed. The royal family was forced into exile. The palace was then used for many different purposes: housing a variety of government and public services in the 1920s, functioning as a makeshift hospital during World War II, a refugee shelter for Greek refugees from the Greco-Turkish War (1919–1922) in 1922, a museum with the personal effects of King George I (now part of the collection of the National Historical Museum), and other uses.

=== The Hellenic Parliament ===
In November 1929, the government decided to relocate the Parliament to the royal palace from its previous location in a neoclassical building on Stadiou Street, the Old Parliament House, now the National Historical Museum. This move marked a significant transformation of the building’s role, with the republic overshadowing the former monarchy. After more extensive renovations, the Senate convened in the "Old Palace" on 2 August 1934, followed by the Fifth National Assembly on 1 July 1935. Although the monarchy was restored that same year, the building has housed Parliament ever since. The transformation of the building into the Parliament was carried out by architect Andreas Kriezis.

On 25 March 1932, the unveiling of the Tomb of the Unknown Soldier, which had begun construction in 1929, took place.

Today, the building serves as the headquarters of the Hellenic Parliament. Other buildings associated with the Parliament include the Tobacco Factory (housing the Parliament’s Library and Archives), the building on Vasilissis Amalias Avenue (for administrative services), the buildings at 4 Voulis Street and 2 Mitropoleos Street (offices for regional Members of Parliament), the Exhibition Hall of the Parliament Foundation, part of the Arvanitis Mansion (for administrative services), and the building at 1A Sekeri Street (for administrative services).

In 2003, new statues were unveiled to honor two prominent Prime Ministers of the country, Charilaos Trikoupis and Eleftherios Venizelos, further enhancing the republican image of the Palace. An exhibition tracing the building’s history from its origins was held in 2009.

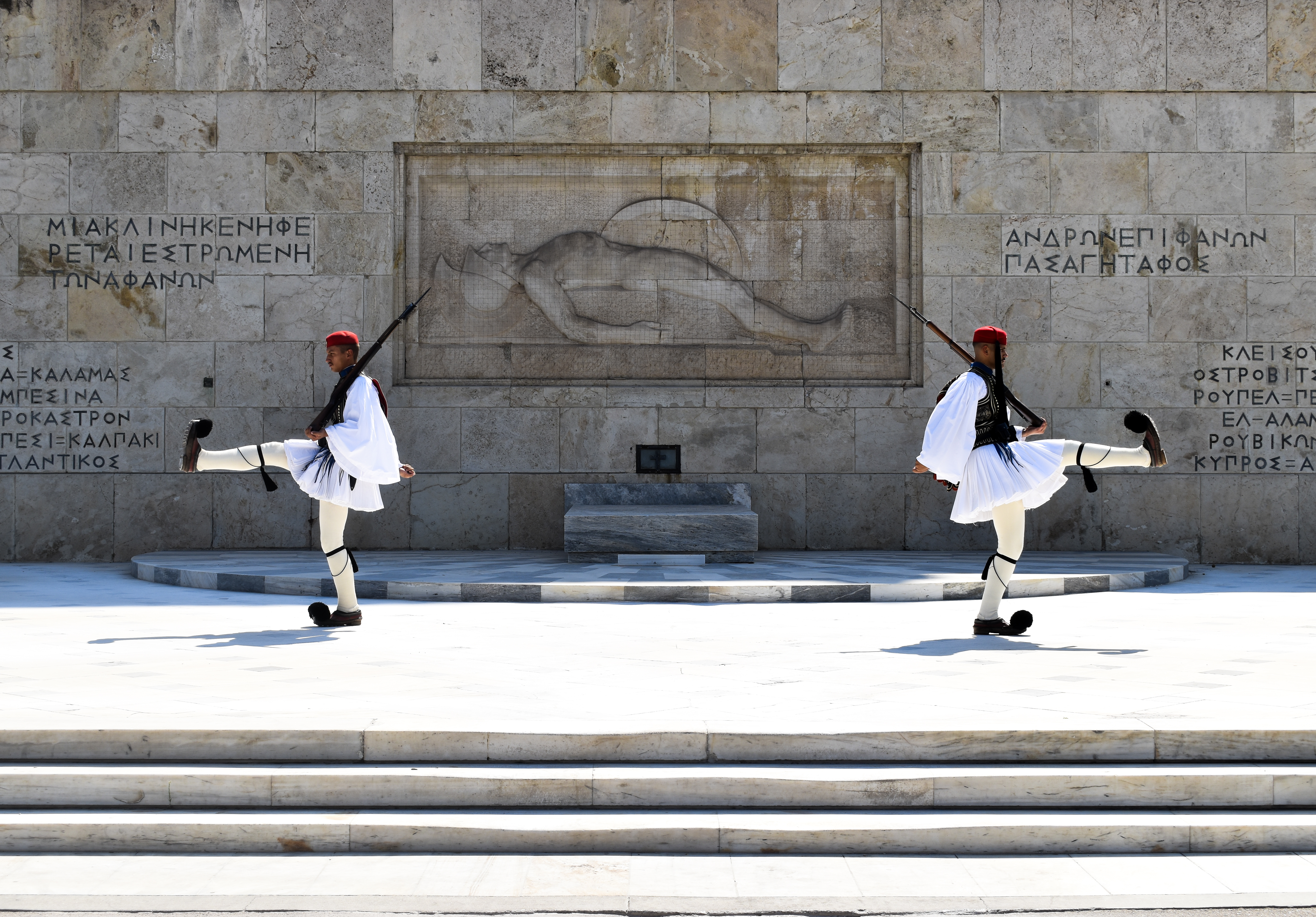
Evzones guarding the Tomb of the Unknown Soldier

In front of the Parliament, the Tomb of the Unknown Soldier is guarded by a unit of the Greek army known as the Evzones, forming the Presidential Guard. The Evzones wear traditional Greek uniforms, with the most distinctive feature being the fustanella. The changing of the guard occurs every hour. The Grand Change of the Guard, which includes officers and a marching band, occurs every Sunday at 11:00 a.m. It is a popular event among visitors and Athenians, regularly attracting crowds of spectators.

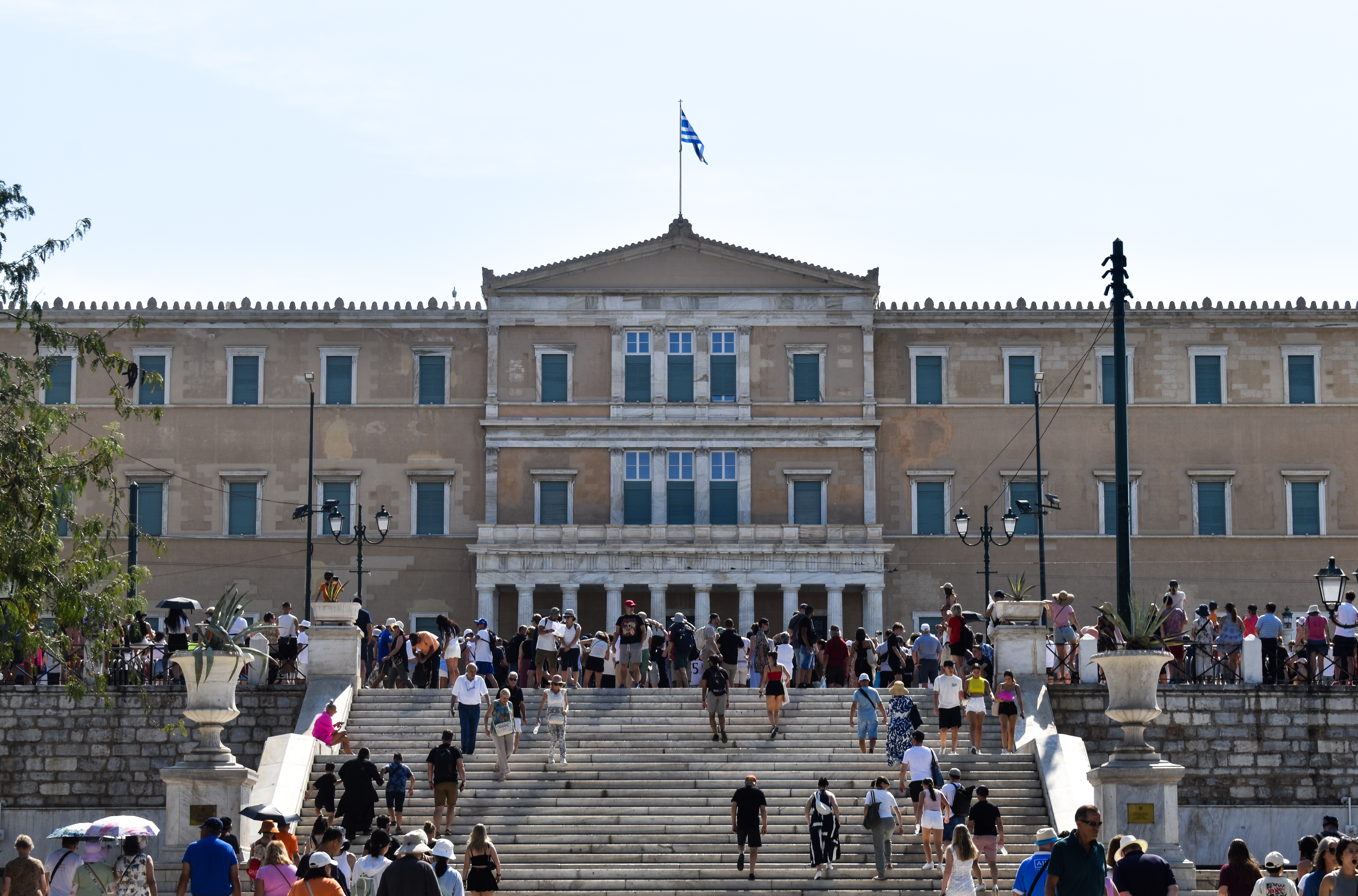
Spectators gathering from Syntagma Square to watch the Grand Change of the Guard

== Architecture ==
=== The Building ===
The Old Palace, according to Gärtner’s designs, is a massive rectangular three-story building, including the ground floor, with two axes of symmetry. The main axis runs East-West and aligns with Ermou Street, the longest street in Athens at the time, while the secondary axis, running North-South, aligns with the western slope of Lycabettus and the columns of the Temple of Olympian Zeus. The building consists of four wings (one on each side) and a central interior wing along the main axis, flanked by two internal courtyards (atriums). The central wing, with a double-pitched tiled roof, extends 0.58 meters beyond the eastern and western facades, creating two pediments at the edges. The central sections of the northern and southern wings are recessed by approximately 3.80 meters from the eastern and western facades. The projections of the central wing and the recesses of the side wings create a distinctive plasticity with a heavy classical tone, giving the building a unique architectural character.

Both the eastern and western facades are approximately 90 meters long, while the other two facades are about 80 meters each. The entire building is elevated by 1.5 meters from the surrounding area. All the exterior wings have a ground floor and two upper stories. The height of the ground floor is 7.16 meters (gross), the first floor is 7.11 meters (gross), and the second floor is 5.5 meters. In contrast, the central wing has a basement, a ground floor with the same height as the other wings, but only one upper story, which is 14.20 meters high (taller than the combined heights of the first and second floors of the other wings). This space housed the official reception rooms, the "reception-ball-games" hall, and the grand dining hall. It was the most richly decorated area of the palace, adorned with murals, paintings, maps, furniture, and other decorations.

=== Exterior ===
For the exterior facades of the building’s wings, Gärtner had designed many plans featuring rich decorations, most of which focused on the western facade, which was the most formal. When submitting the designs for approval to King Ludwig, who was also the financier of the building, the king rejected them, citing reasons of economy and a preference to avoid shifting from classical simplicity to a Renaissance style. As Oswald Hederer notes in his book Friedrich von Gaertner:

"...when King Ludwig (of Bavaria) crossed out all the decorative elements of the facades with a red pencil, Gärtner is said to have remarked, somewhat indignantly, 'Well, now, Your Majesty, it looks like a barracks!'"

Despite the imposed simplicity, Gärtner managed, with a few well-chosen elements, to give the massive building an imposing yet serene appearance. He used two bands, like threads, to connect the windowsills around each floor, breaking the monotony of the large exterior surfaces of the wings. Additionally, with the various Doric porticoes at the building’s entrances—except for the southern side, which has Ionic porticoes—he further emphasized the neoclassical architectural style of the building.

== Gallery ==
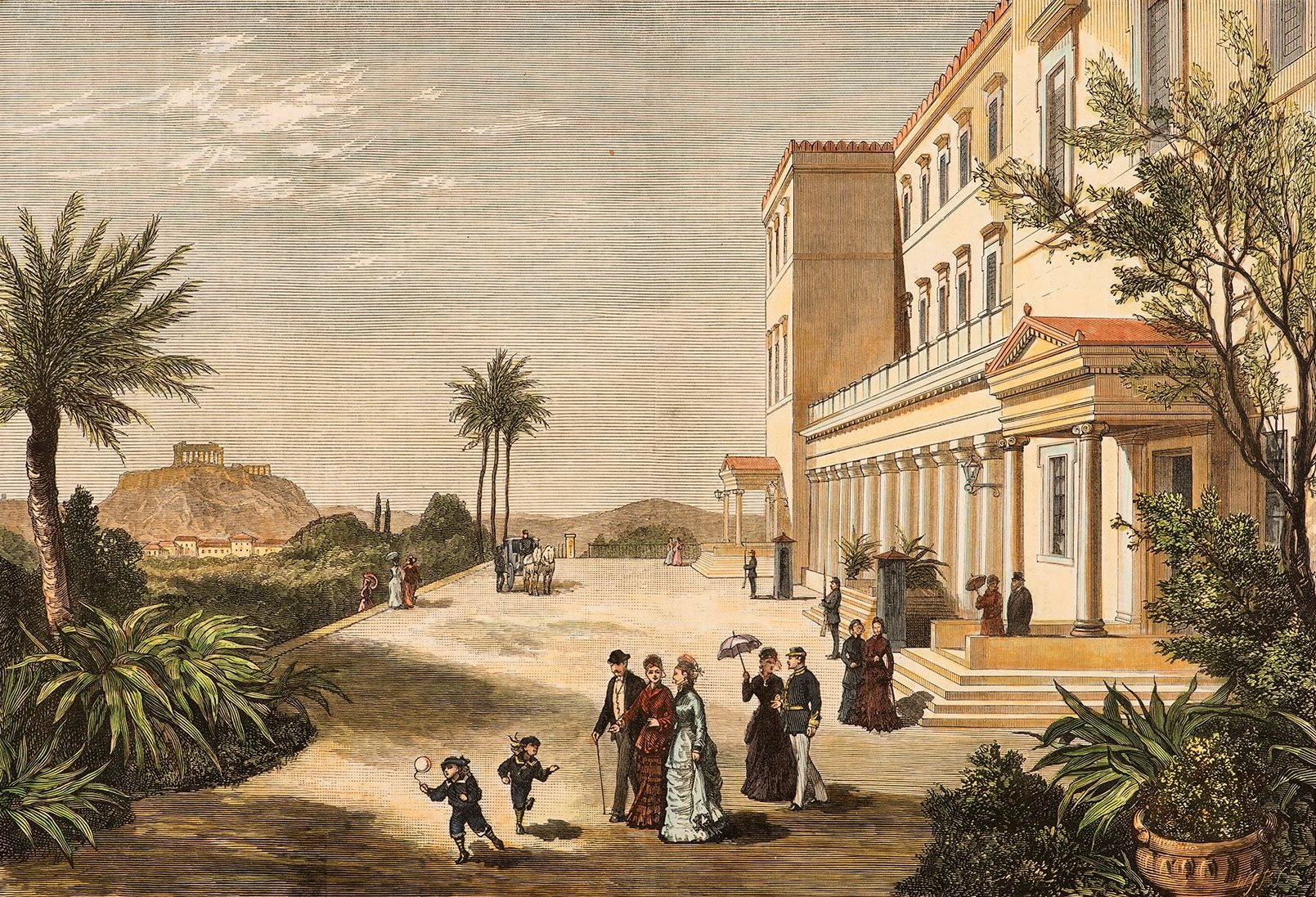
The Old Royal Palace in 1877

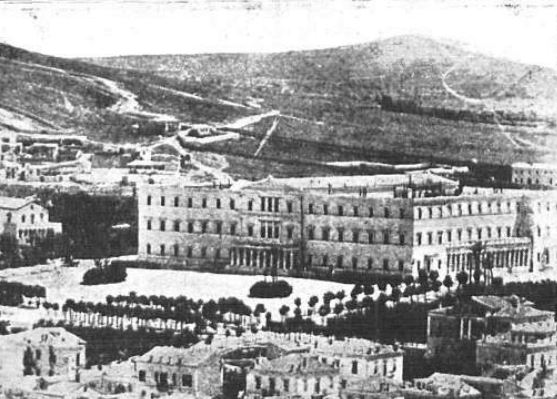
A photograph of the Old Royal Palace in 1910

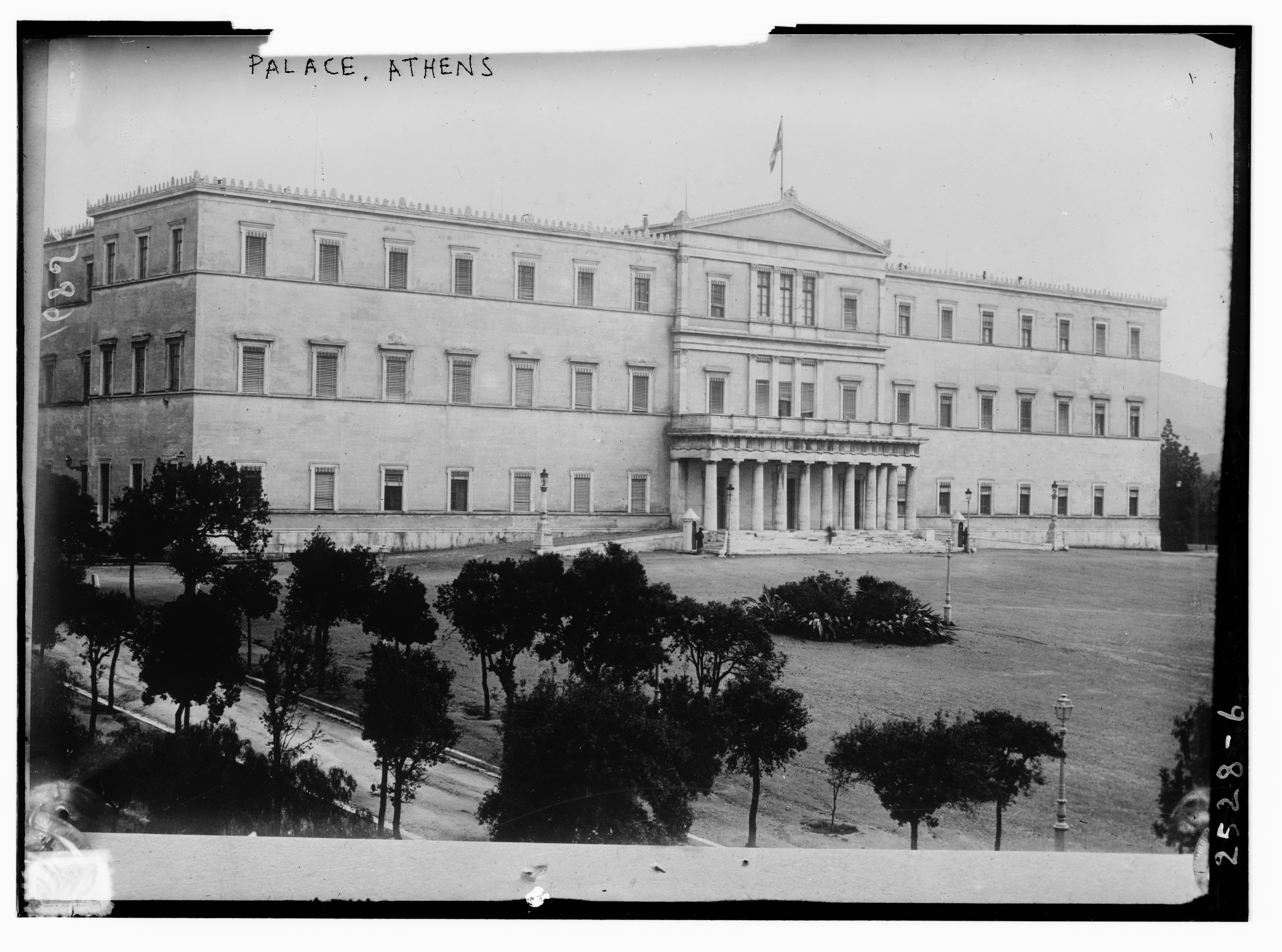
A photograph of the Old Royal Palace in 1910

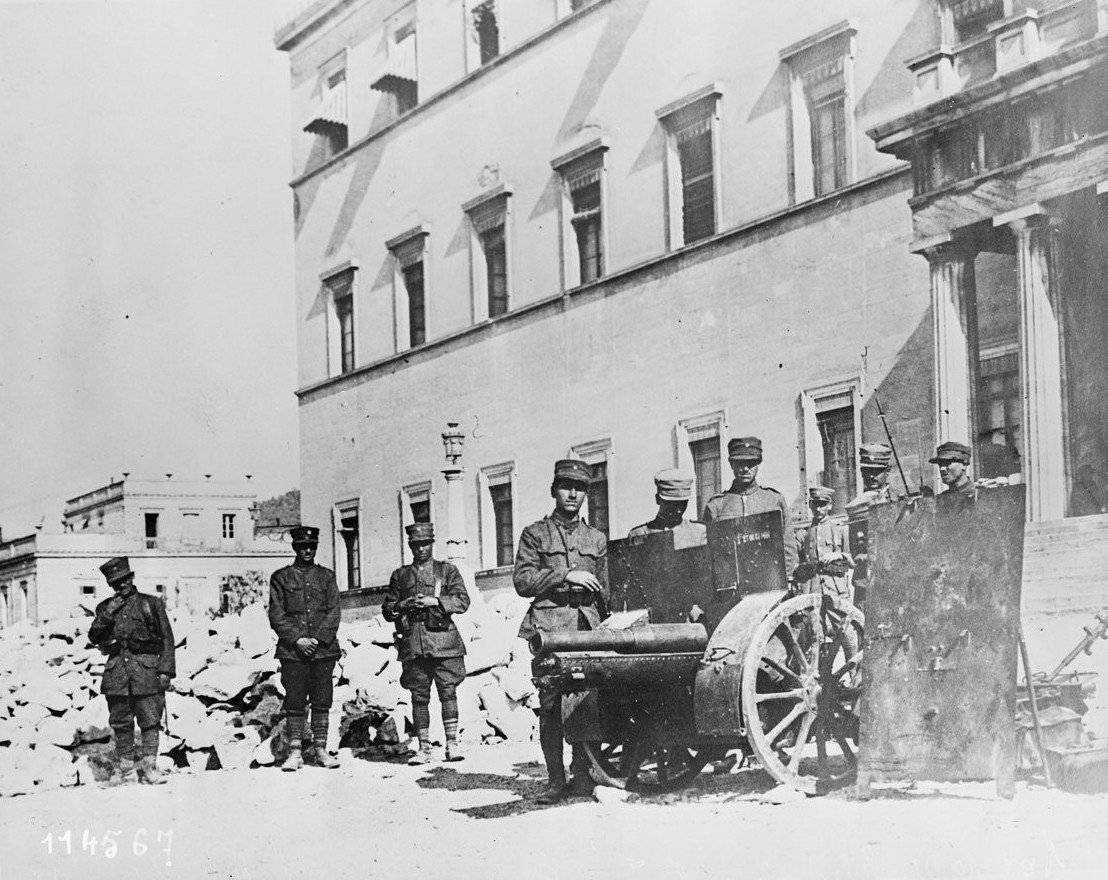
Soldiers and artillery in front of the Old Royal Palace before the elections of 1926

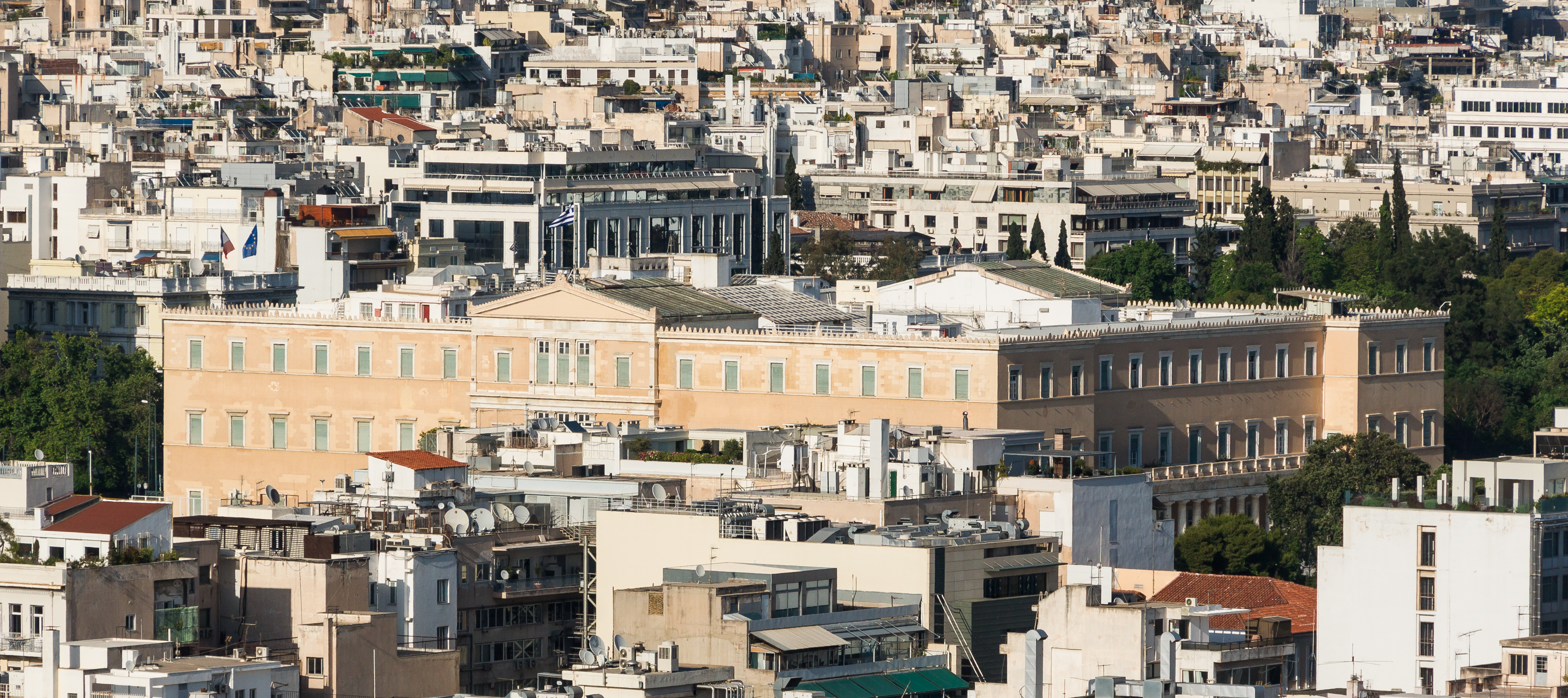
The Old Royal Palace from the Acropolis

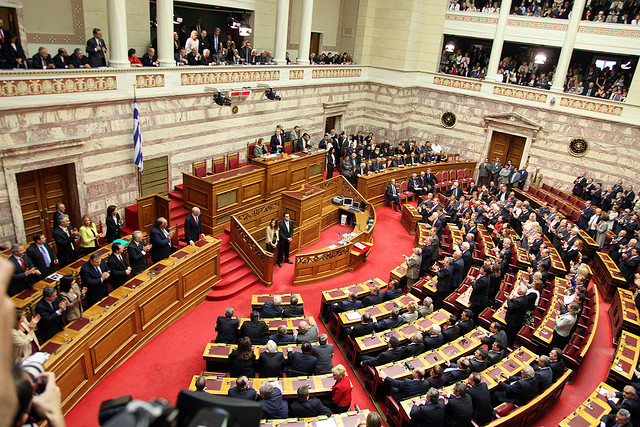
The interior of the Old Royal Palace

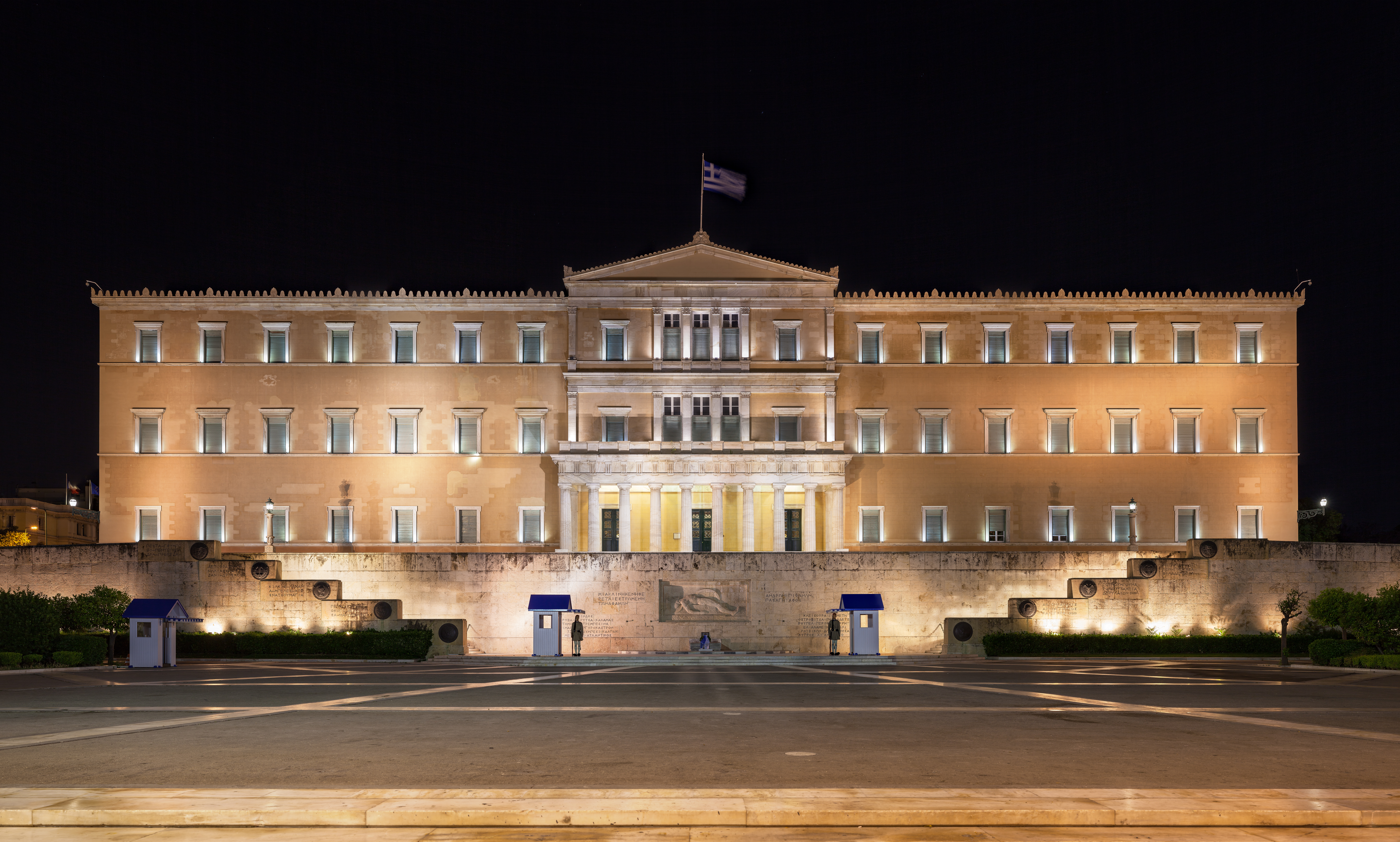
The Old Royal Palace at night

== Bibliography ==
- Kardamitsi-Adami, Maro (2009). Palaces in Greece. Melissa Books. ISBN 978-960-204-289-2.
