= National Historical Museum, Athens =

Coordinates: 37°58′39″N 23°43′58″E

National Historical Museum
- Εθνικό Ιστορικό Μουσείο
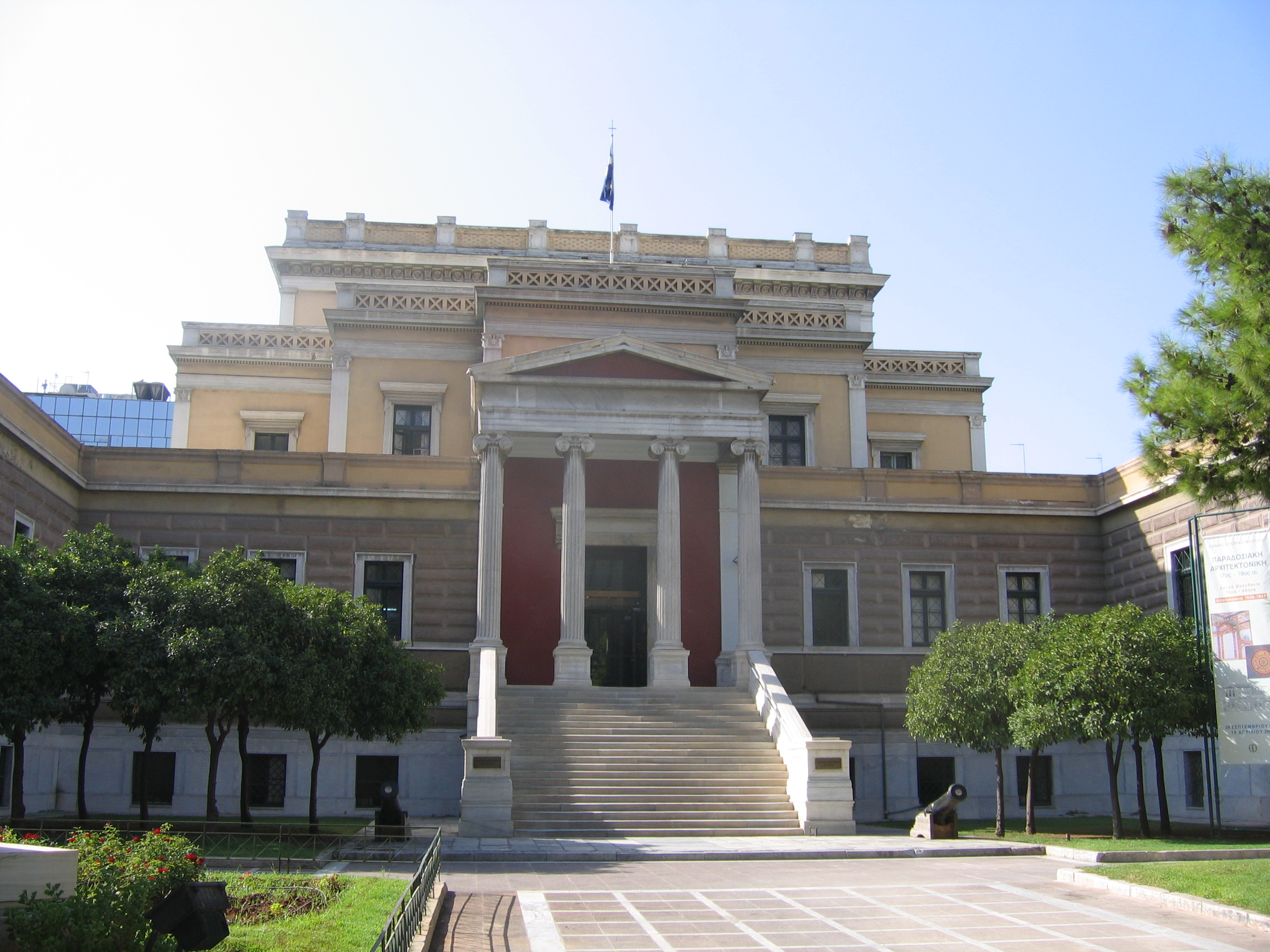
- Established: 1882
- Location: Stadiou Street, Athens, Greece
- Type: Historical museum
- Website: www.nhmuseum.gr

The National Historical Museum (Greek: Εθνικό Ιστορικό Μουσείο, Ethnikó Istorikó Mouseío) is a historical museum in Athens. Founded in 1882, is the oldest of its kind in Greece. It is located in the Old Parliament House at Stadiou Street in Athens, which housed the Hellenic Parliament from 1875 until 1932. A branch of the National History Museum has been organized and operated there since 2001.

== Collections ==
The museum houses the collection of the Historical and Ethnological Society of Greece (IEEE), founded in 1882. It is the oldest collection of its kind in Greece, and prior to its transfer to the Old Parliament, it was housed in the main building of the National Technical University.

The collection contains historical items concerning the period from the fall of Constantinople by the Ottomans in 1453 to the Second World War, emphasizing especially the period of the Greek Revolution and the subsequent establishment of the modern Greek state.

Among the items displayed are weapons, personal belongings and memorabilia from historical personalities, historical paintings by Greek and foreign artists, manuscripts, as well as a large collection of traditional Greek costumes from various regions. The collection is displayed in the corridors and rooms of the building, while the great central hall of the National Assembly is used for conferences.
