= Metaxourgeio =

Metaxourgeio Μεταξουργείο
- Neighborhood
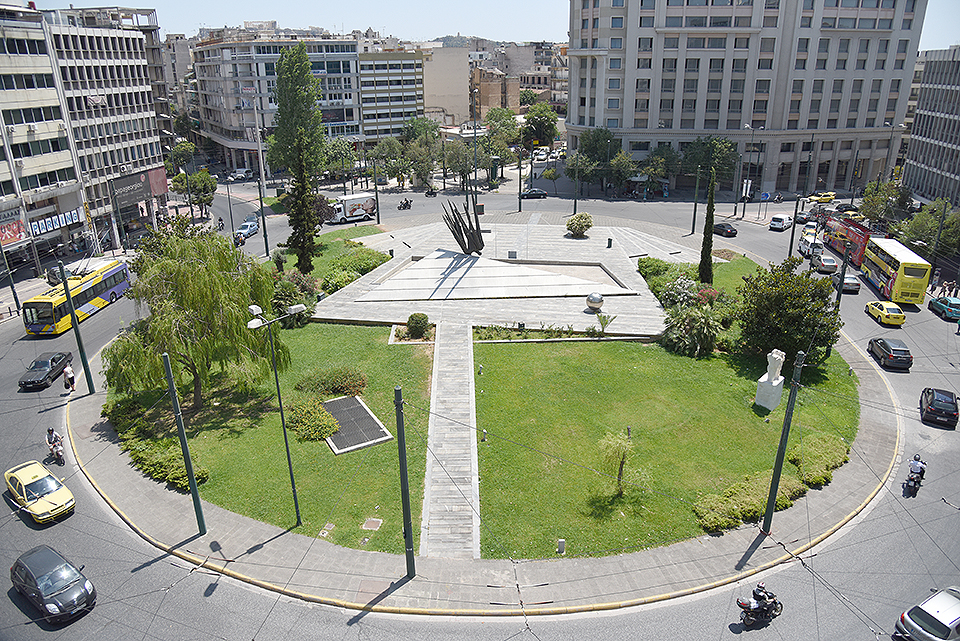
- Karaiskaki Square-Metaxourgeio

- Location within Athens municipality
- Coordinates: 37°59′10″N 23°43′17″E
- Country: Greece
- Region: Attica
- City: Athens
- Postal code: 104 35, 104 36, 104 37
- Area code: 21
- Website: www.cityofathens.gr

Metaxourgeio or Metaxourgio (Greek: Μεταξουργείο pronounced [me.tak.suɾˈʝio]), meaning "silk mill", is a neighbourhood of Athens, Greece. The neighbourhood is located north of the historical centre of Athens, between Kolonos to the west and Plateia Vathi to the east, and north of Kerameikos. Metaxourgeio is frequently described as a transition neighbourhood. After a long period of abandonment in the late 20th century, the area is acquiring a reputation as an artistic and fashionable neighbourhood due to the opening of many art galleries, museums, and trendy restaurants and cafes. The centre of the neighborhood is Avdi Square, where theatres and an art gallery are located, and in which festivals and gatherings are periodically hold.

== History ==
Metaxourgeio is built on the Dimosio Sima, the ancient cemetery of eminent Athenians. For centuries, the area was largely rural and stood on the outskirts of the city. The construction of the Metaxourgeio factory in the early 19th century paved the way for the neighbourhood's inclusion in the larger urban area. During the course of Athens' dramatic growth in the late 19th century, Metaxourgeio became a thriving working-class neighbourhood, housing many craftsmen, tradesmen, and small-business owners. The population of the neighbourhood continued to grow during the course of the early twentieth century, maintaining its working-class profile, until a period of abandonment beginning in the 1970s. Metaxourgeio's abrupt population decrease during this period reflects the larger situation in Athens, when many inhabitants moved to cities within the region but outside of the capital. A lack of building renewal and restrictive traffic regulations exacerbated this trend in Metaxourgeio. Continuing into the 1980s, the area's image of abandonment combined with a decrease in employment opportunities further discouraged new inhabitants.

By 2001, the population of the neighbourhood had stabilised, largely due to an influx of immigrants as well as upper middle-class residents who found the area's low rents and proximity to high-profile meeting places attractive. In the period leading up to the 2004 Olympic games, renovation projects and infrastructure rebuilding throughout Athens extended to Metaxourgeio as well, which further attracted new higher-income residents.

Since January 2000, the district has been connected with the Athens metropolitan line 2.

== People ==
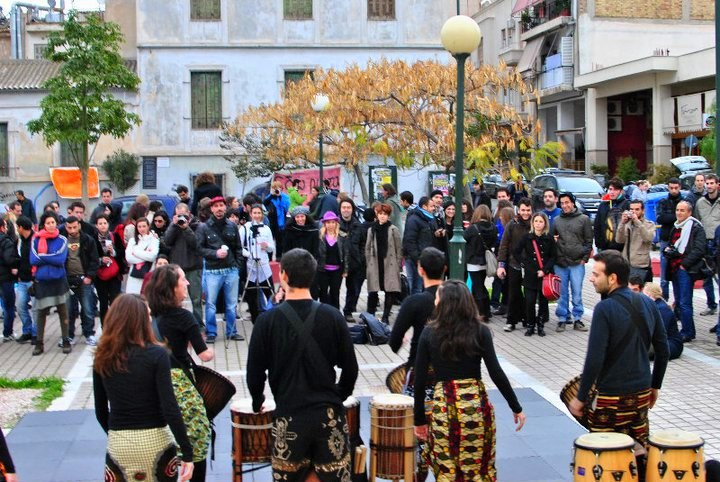
Festival in Avdi Square in the heart of Metaxourgeio

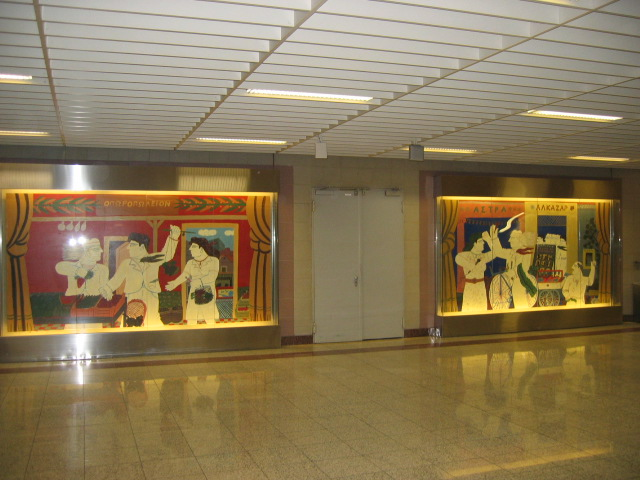
Work of art by Alekos Fassianos located in the metropolitan station

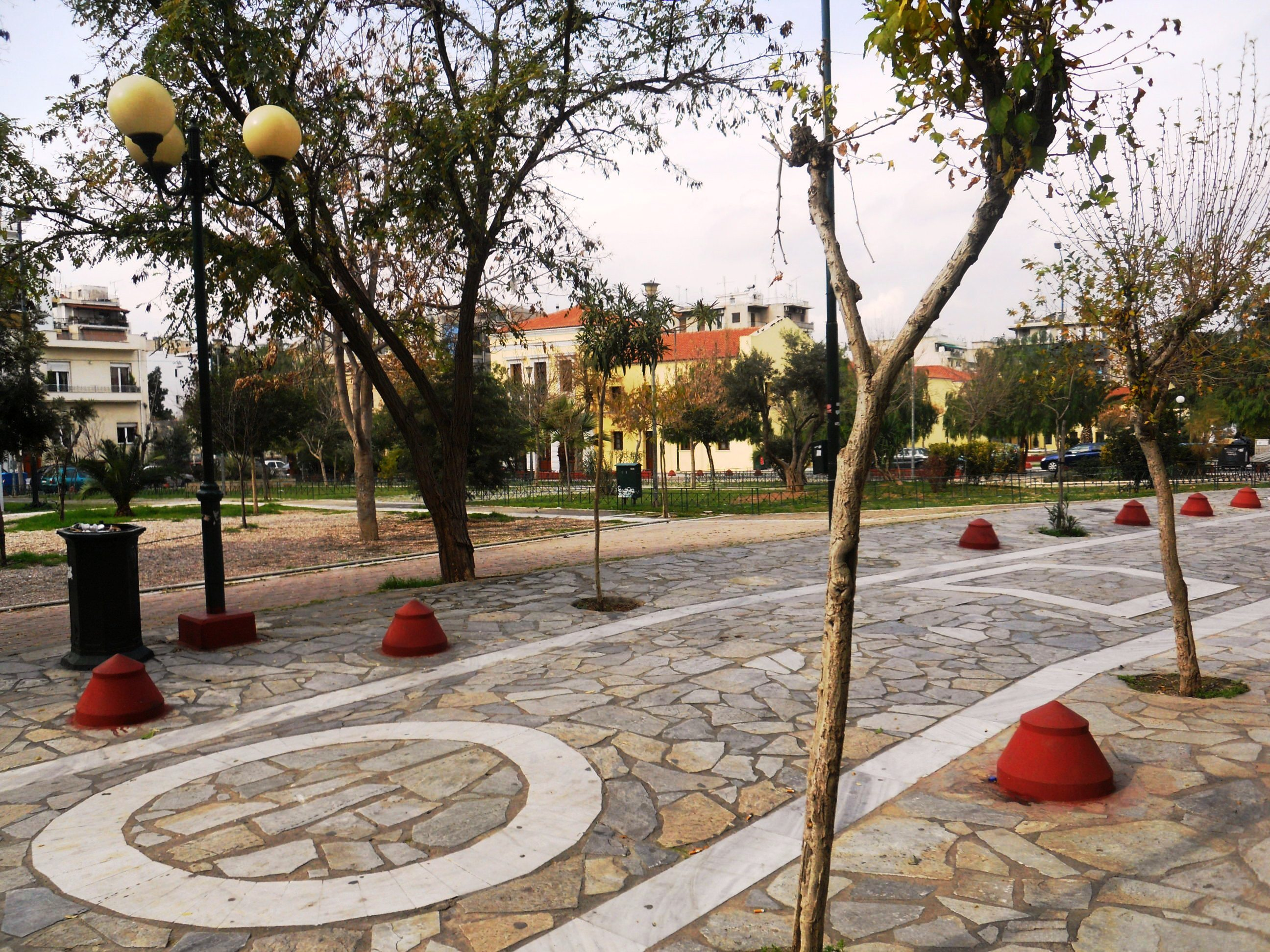
Avdi Square

- Alekos Fassianos (1935–2022), Greek painter
- Vicky Moscholiou, Greek musical artist
- Giorgos Zampetas, Greek musician
- Tassos Livaditis (1922–1988), Greek poet and writer
- Marika Kotopouli (1887–1954), Greek actress
- Zeta Makripoulia (born in 1978), Greek model, actress and television presenter
