= Outline of Athens =

City, capital of Greece, in Europe

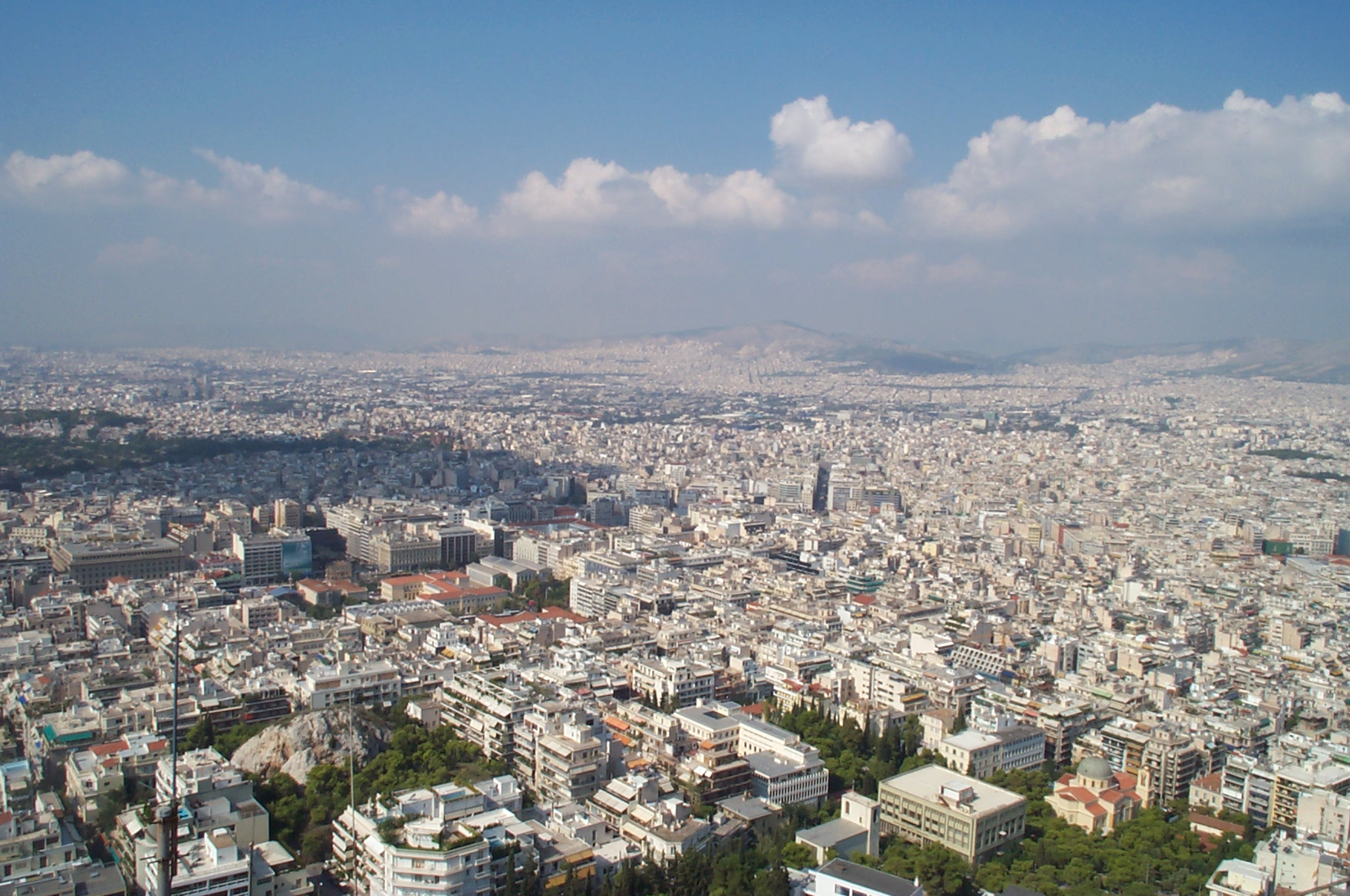
Athens

The following outline is provided as an overview of and topical guide to Athens:

Athens is the capital and largest city of Greece. A significant coastal urban area in the Mediterranean, Athens is also the capital of the Attica region and is the southernmost capital on the European mainland. With its urban area's population numbering over 3.6 million, it is the eighth-largest urban area in the European Union (EU). The Municipality of Athens (also City of Athens), which constitutes a small administrative unit of the entire urban area, had a population of 643,452 in 2021, within its official limits, and a land area of 38.96 square kilometres (15.04 square miles). Athens joined the UNESCO Global Network of Learning Cities in 2016.

== General reference ==
- Pronunciation: /ˈæθɪnz/ ATH-inz; Greek: Αθήνα, romanized: Athína [aˈθina]; Ancient Greek: Ἀθῆναι, romanized: Athênai [atʰɛ̂ːnai̯]
- Common English name(s): Athens
- Official English name(s): Athens
- Adjectival(s): Athenian
- Demonym(s): Athenian

== Geography of Athens ==
Geography of Athens

- Athens is:
  - a city
    - capital of Attica
    - capital of Greece
    - primate city of Greece
- Population of Athens:
  - 637,798 (city proper and municipality)
  - 3,090,508 (urban area)
- Area of Athens:
  - 38.964 km^{2} (15.044 sq mi) (city proper and municipality)
  - 412 km^{2} (159 sq mi) (urban area)
- Atlas of Athens
- Topography of Athens

=== Location of Athens ===
Athens Αθήνα
- Location within Greece
- Coordinates: 37°59′02.3″N 23°43′40.1″E

- Athens is situated within the following regions:
  - Northern Hemisphere and Eastern Hemisphere
    - Eurasia
      - Europe (outline)
        - Southern Europe
          - Balkan Peninsula
            - Greece (outline)
              - Central Greece
                - Attica
                  - Central Athens
                    - Municipality of Athens
- Time zones:
  - Eastern European Time (UTC+02)
  - Eastern European Summer Time (UTC+03)

=== Environment of Athens ===
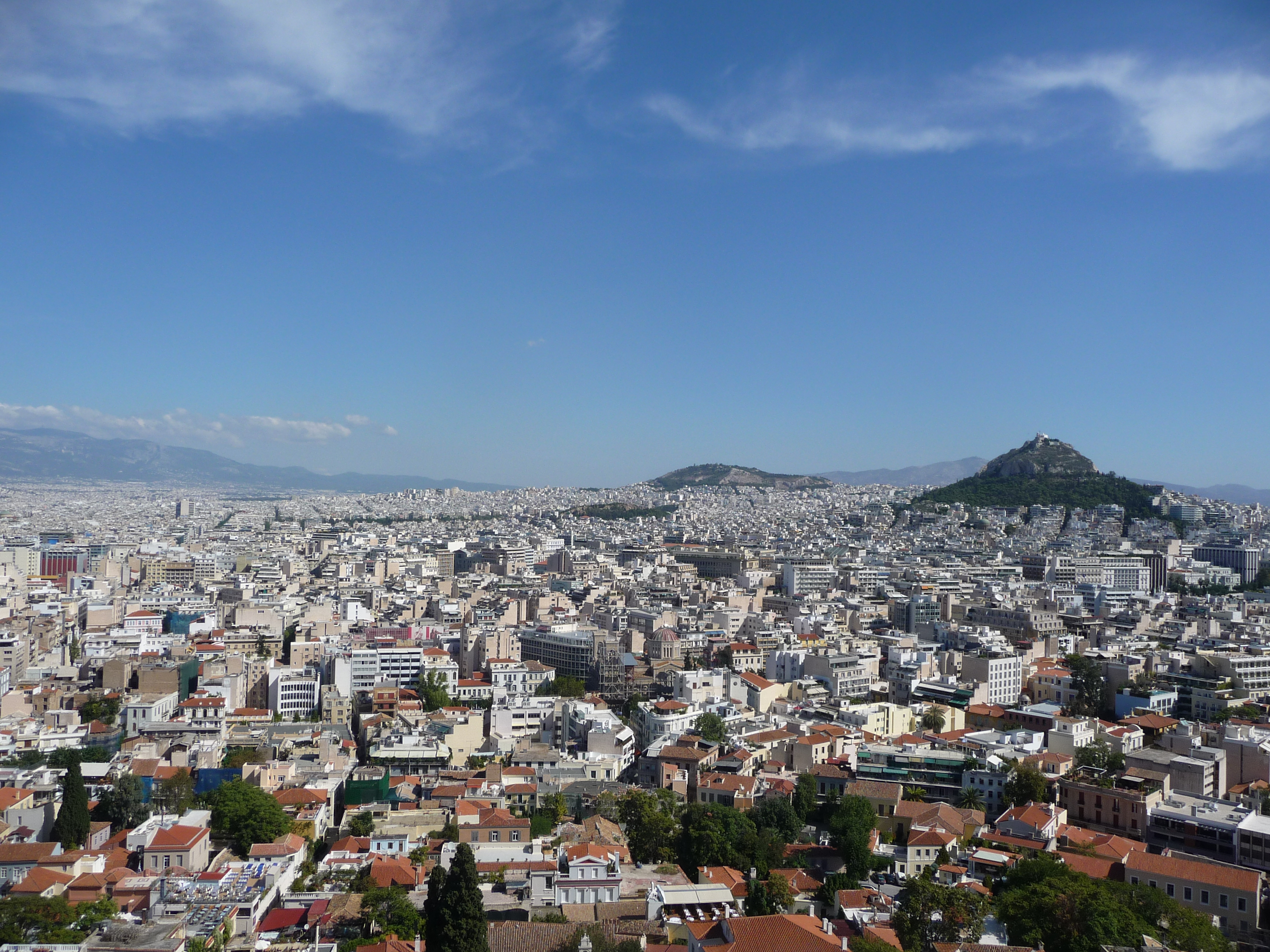
Mount Lycabettus

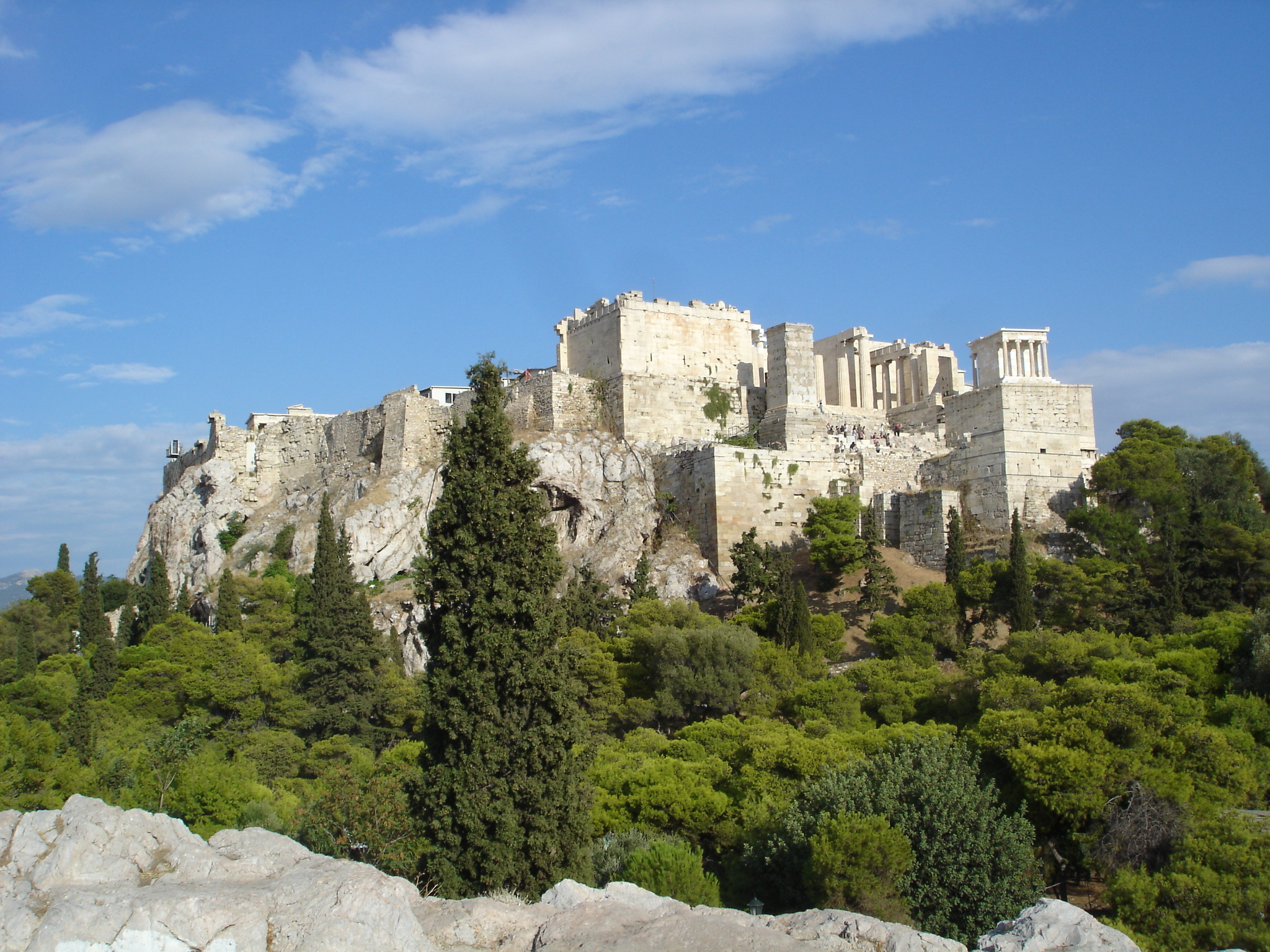
The Acropolis of Athens, a World Heritage Site, as seen from the Areopagus

- Climate of Athens

==== Natural geographic features of Athens ====
- Hills in Athens
  - Areopagus
  - Mount Lycabettus
  - Pnyx
  - Skouze Hill
  - Strefi Hill
- Rivers in Athens
  - Cephissus
  - Ilisos
- World Heritage Sites in Athens
  - Acropolis of Athens
  - Daphni Monastery

=== Areas surrounding Athens ===
==== Municipality of Athens ====
Municipality of Athens

=== Areas of Athens ===
==== Neighborhoods in municipality of Athens ====
- Aerides
- Agios Eleftherios
- Agios Panteleimonas
- Akadimia
- Akadimia Platonos
- Acropolis
- Ampelokipi
- Anafiotika
- Ano Petralona
- Asyrmatos
- Asteroskopeio
- Attiki
- Eleonas
- Ellinoroson
- Erythros Stavros
- Exarcheia
- Gazi
- Girokomeio
- Gyzi
- Goudi
- Gouva
- Ilisia
- Kallimarmaro
- Kato Petralona
- Keramikos
- Kolokynthou
- Kolonaki
- Kolonos
- Koukaki
- Kountouriotika
- Kypriadou
- Kypseli
- Kynosargous
- Makrygianni
- Metaxourgeio
- Mets
- Monastiraki
- Nea Filothei
- Neapoli
- Neos Kosmos
- Omonoia
- Pangrati
- Patisia
- Pedion tou Areos
- Petralona
- Philopappou
- Plaka
- Polygono
- Probonas
- Profitis Daniil
- Profitis Ilias
- Psyri
- Rizoupoli
- Rouf
- Sepolia
- Syntagma
- Thiseio
- Thymarakia
- Treis Gefyres
- Votanikos

==== Athens Metropolitan Area ====
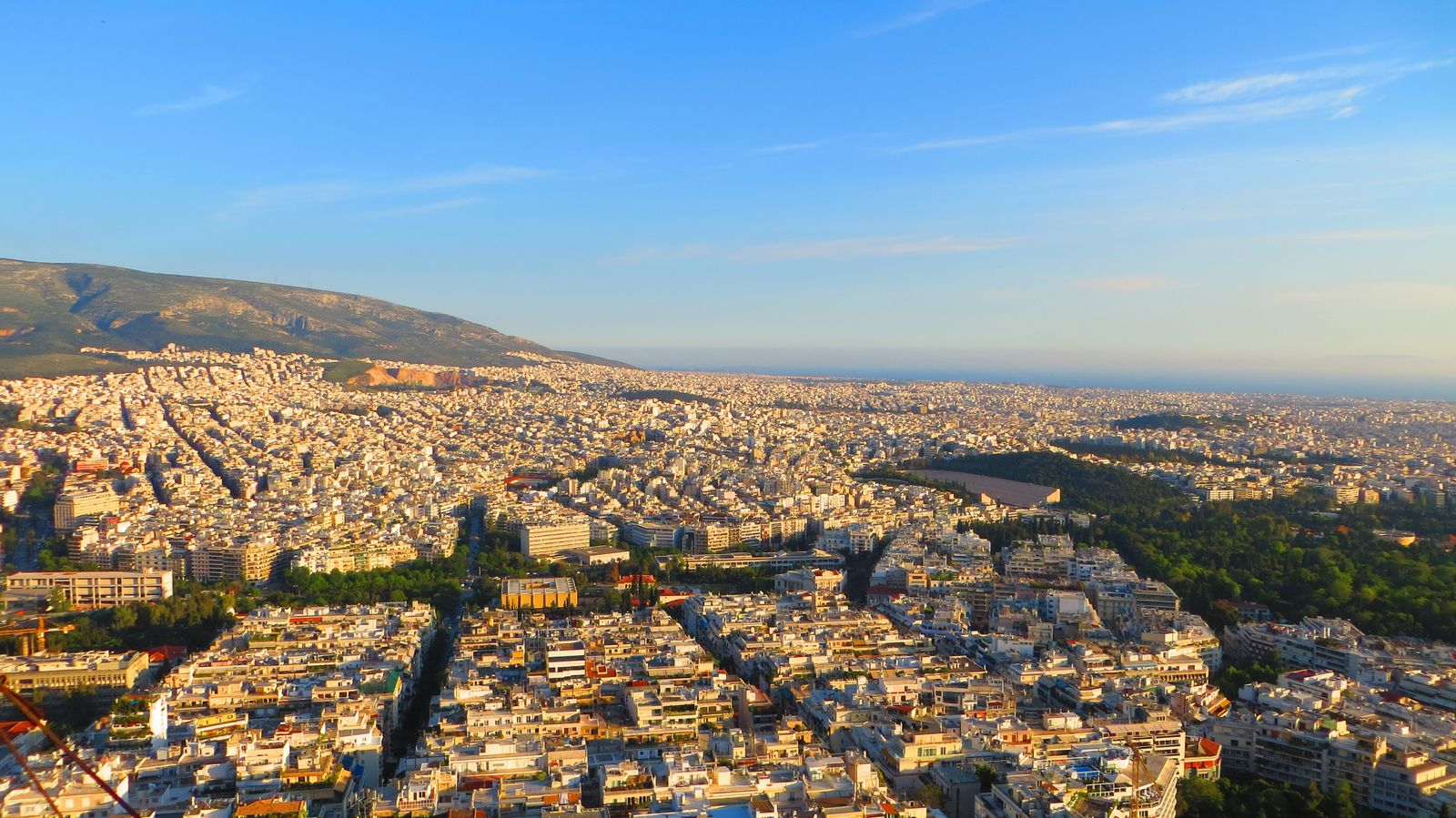
View of Athens

Athens Metropolitan Area

- Central Athens
- North Athens
- South Athens
- West Athens
- Piraeus
- East Attica
- West Attica

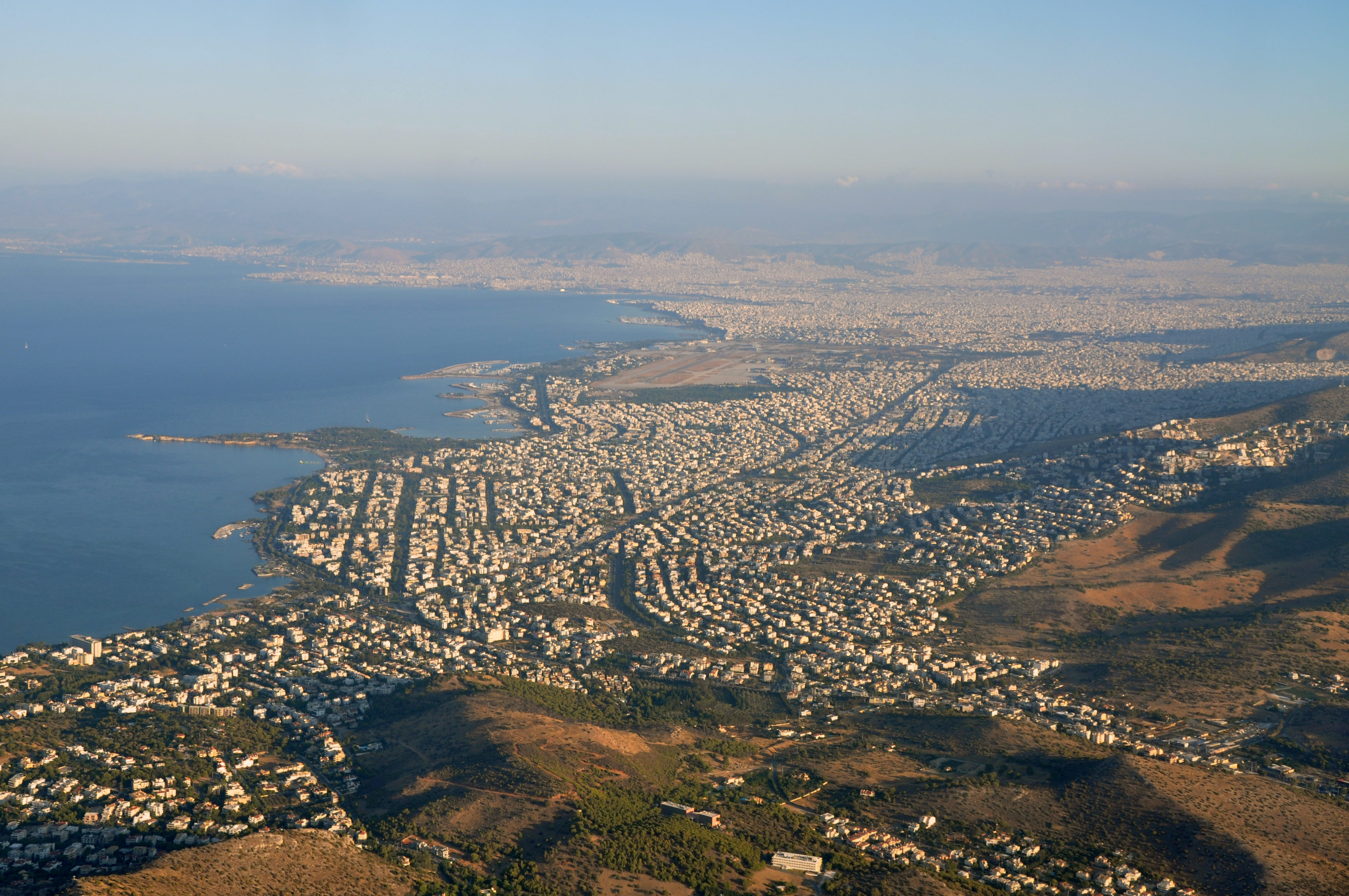
Aerial view of the Athens urban area and the Saronic Gulf

==== Athens Urban Area ====
Athens Urban Area

- North Athens
- Central Athens
- South Athens
- West Athens
- Piraeus
- Part of East Attica
- Part of West attica

=== Locations in Athens ===
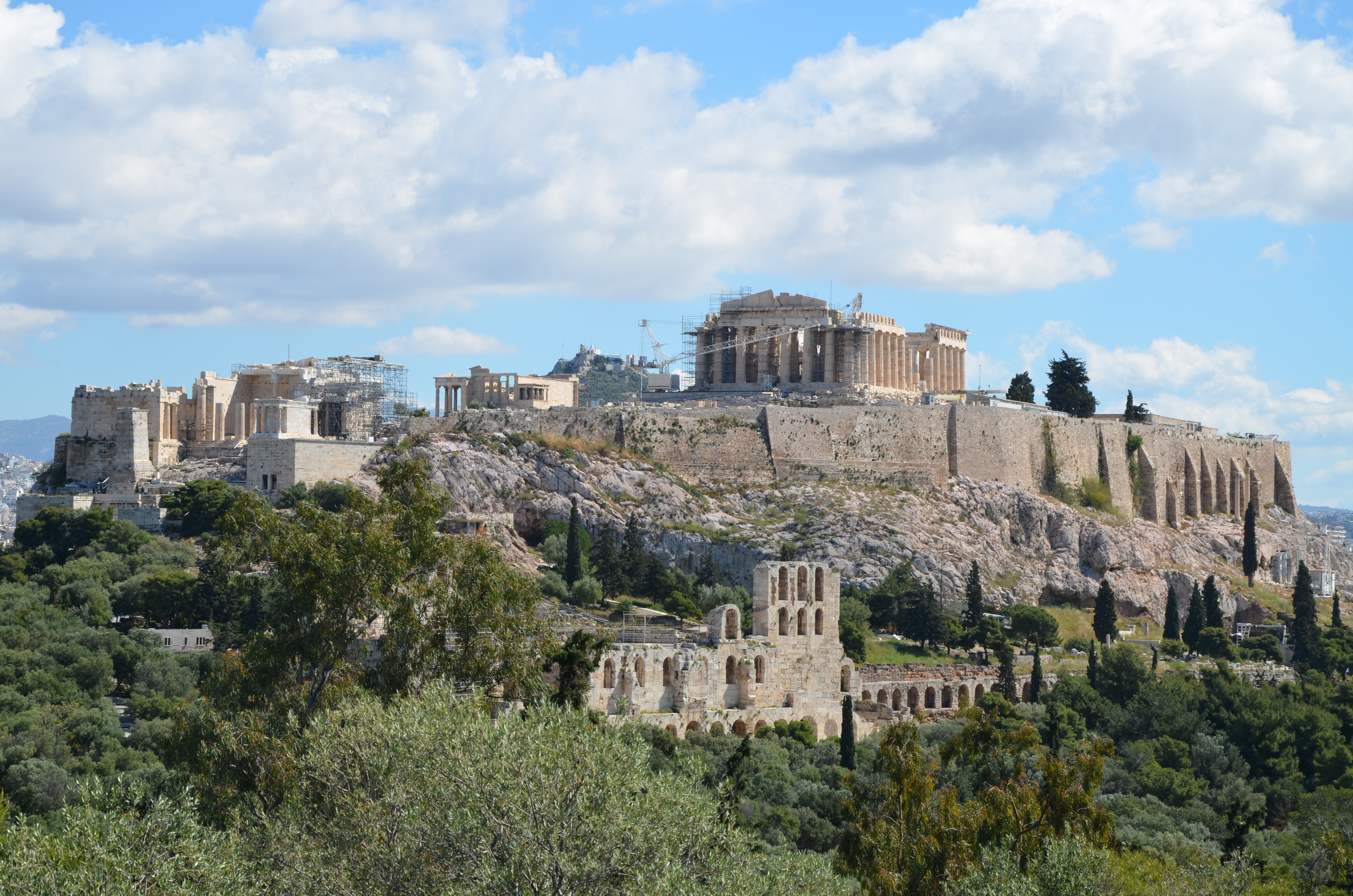
The Acropolis of Athens as seen from the Hill of the Muses

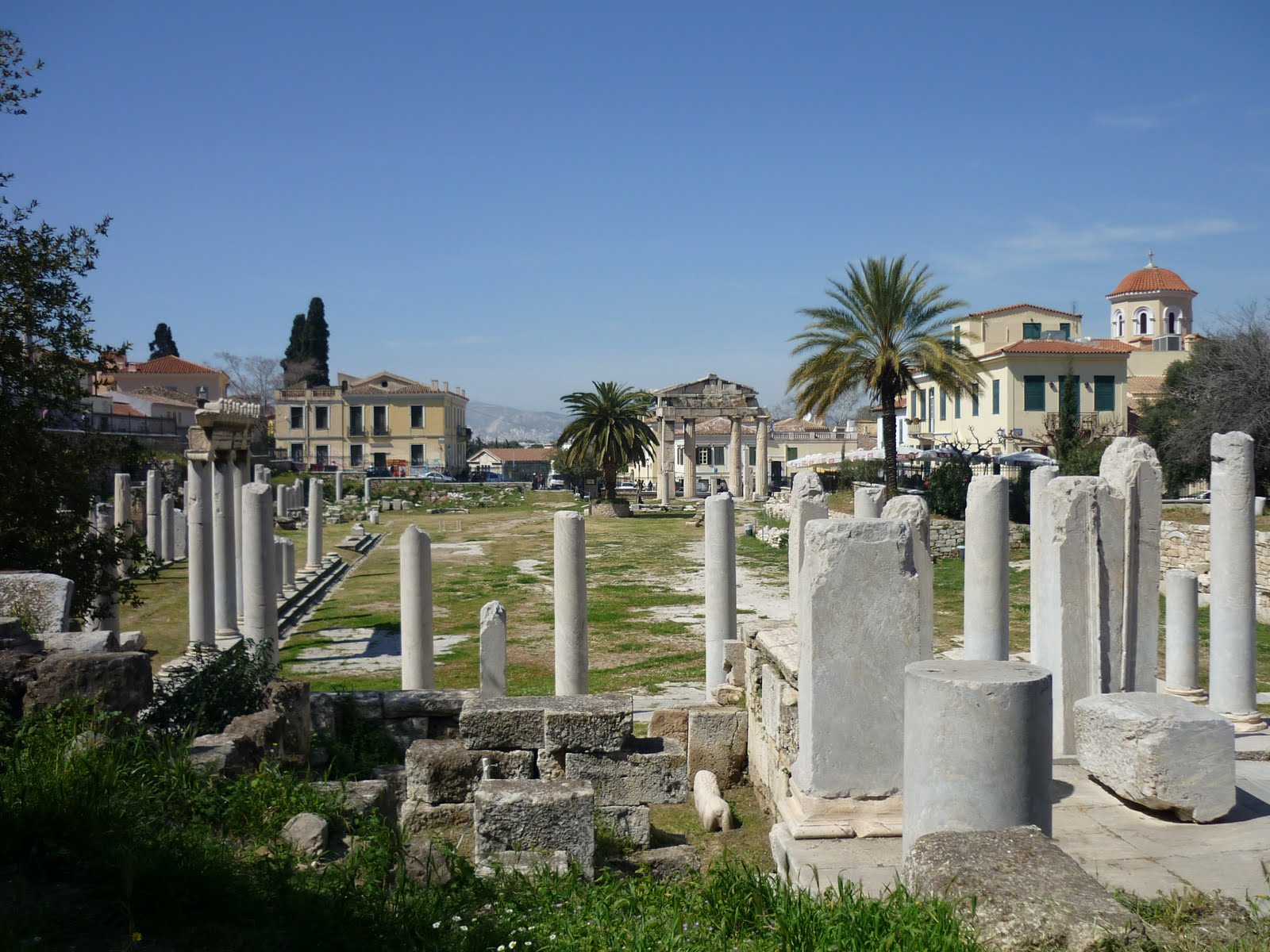
Remains of the Roman Agora built in Athens during the Roman period

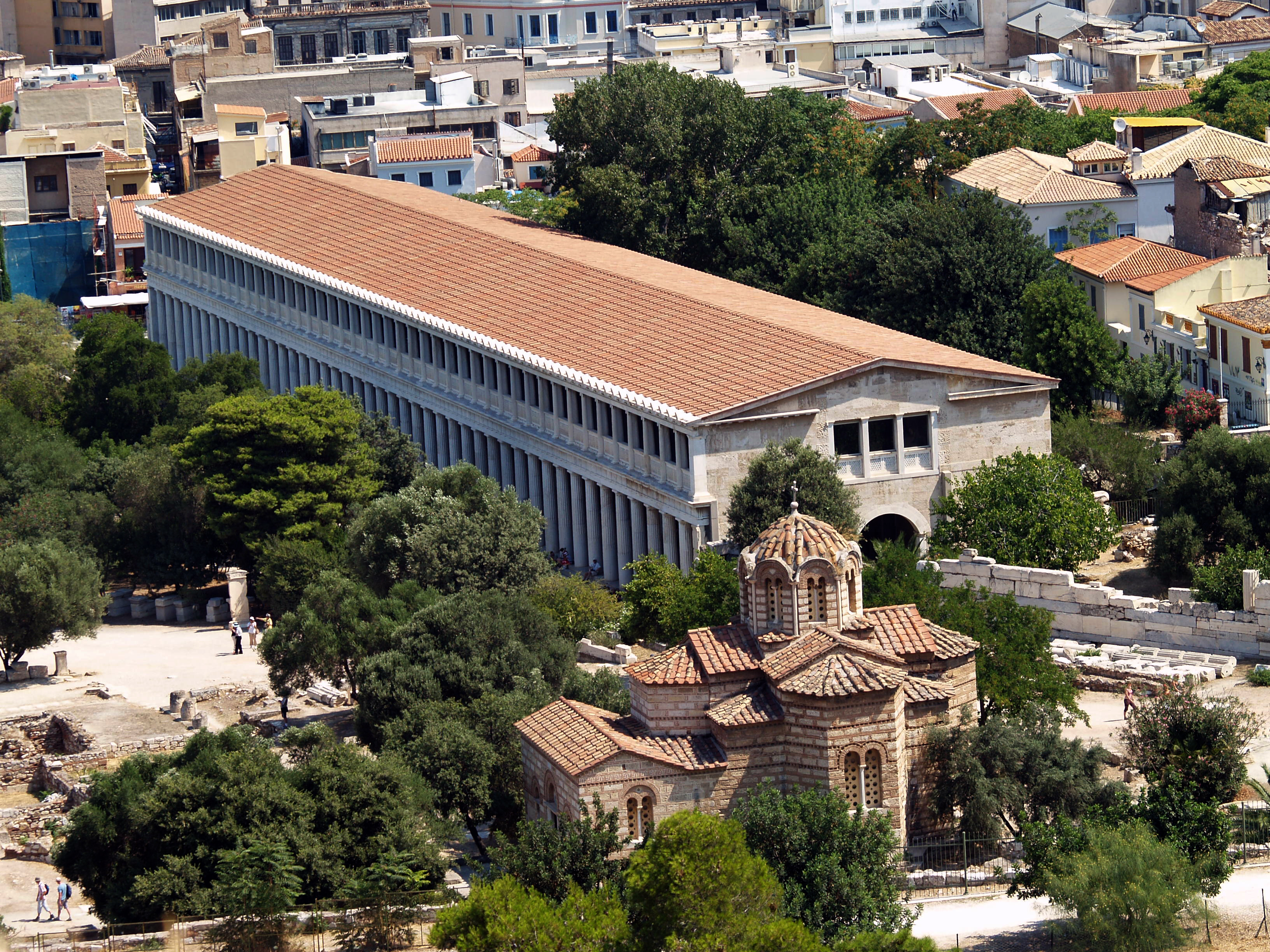
The Stoa of Attalos

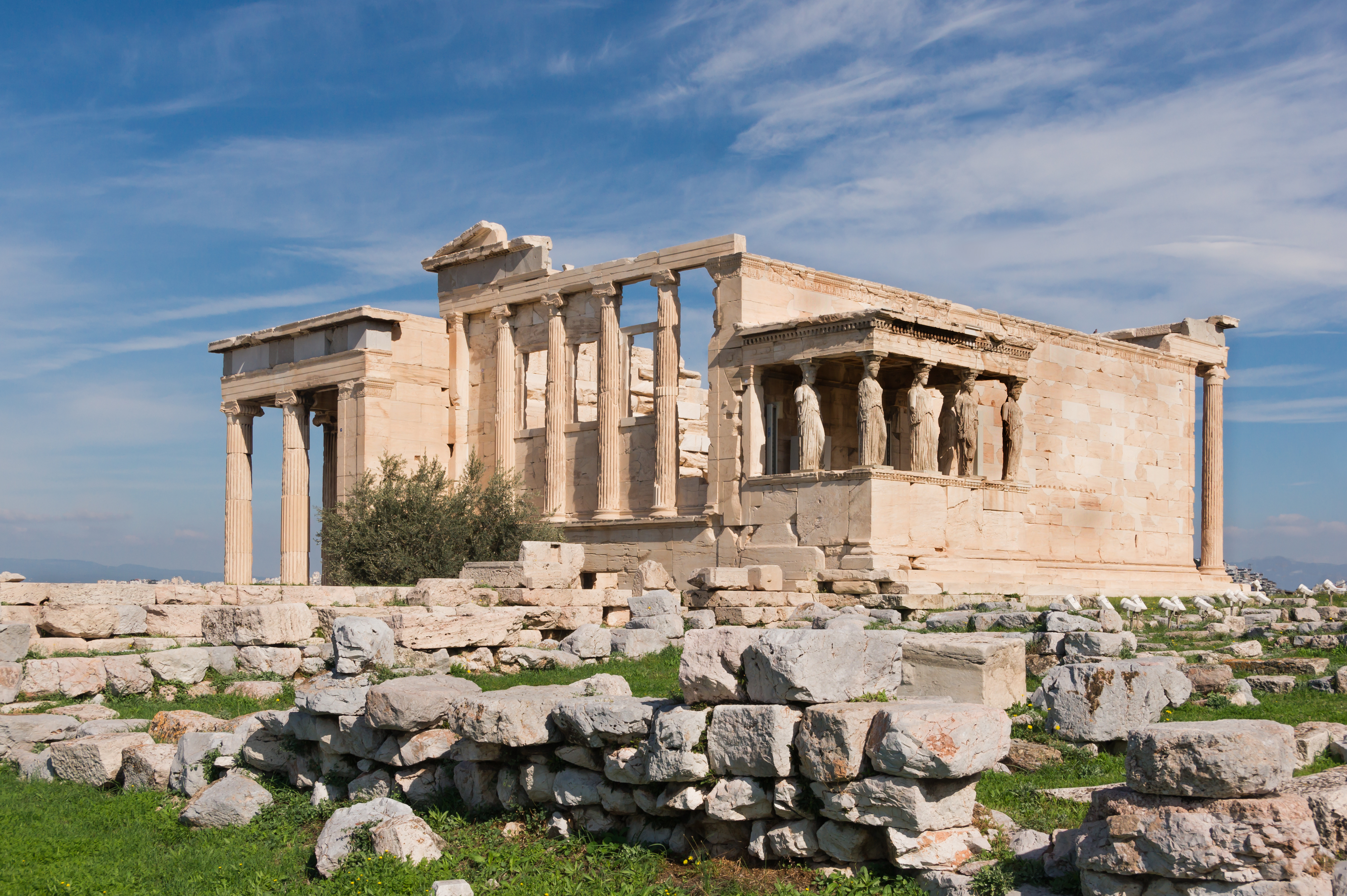
The Erechtheion

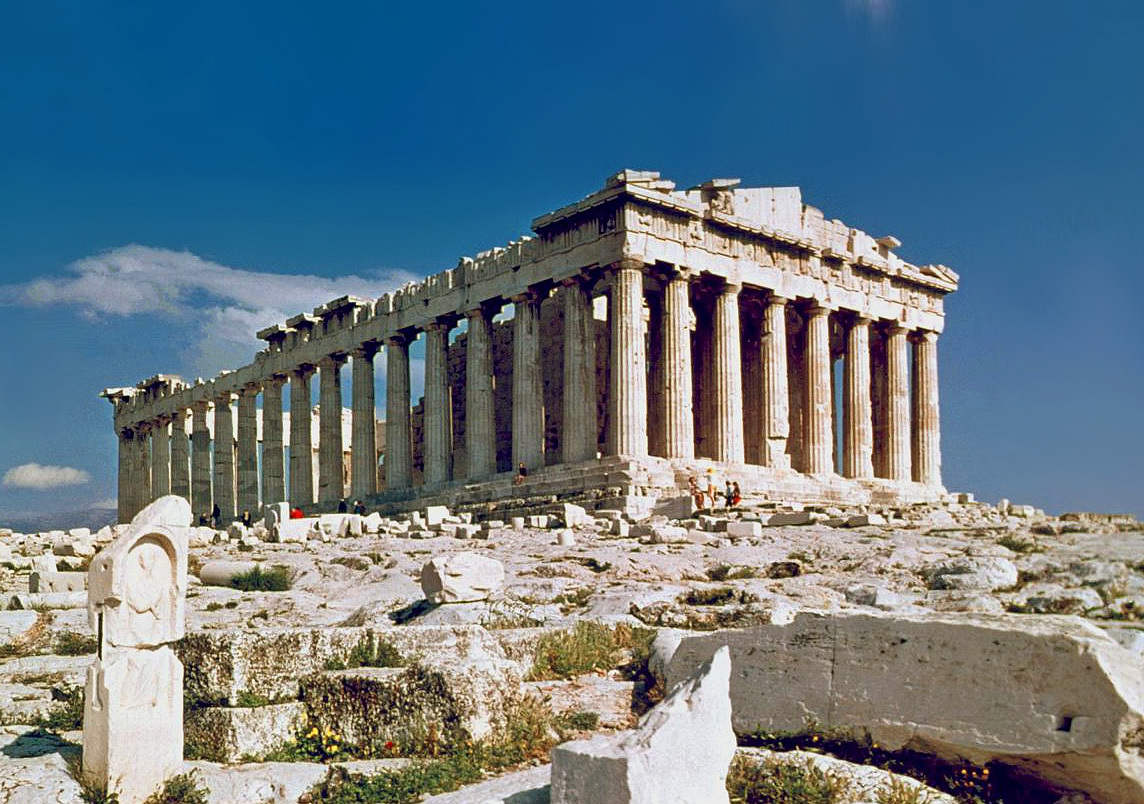
The Parthenon

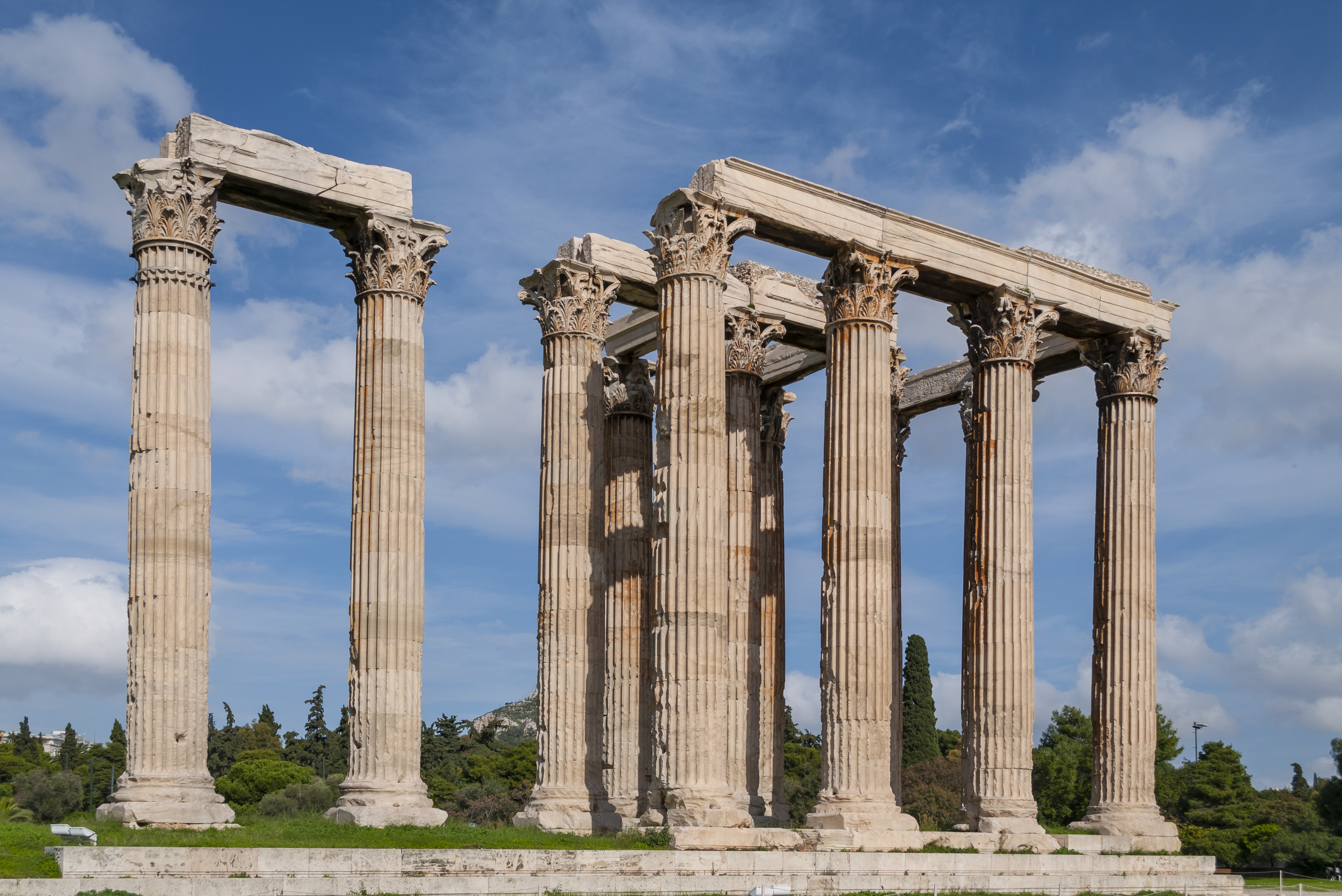
Temple of Olympian Zeus

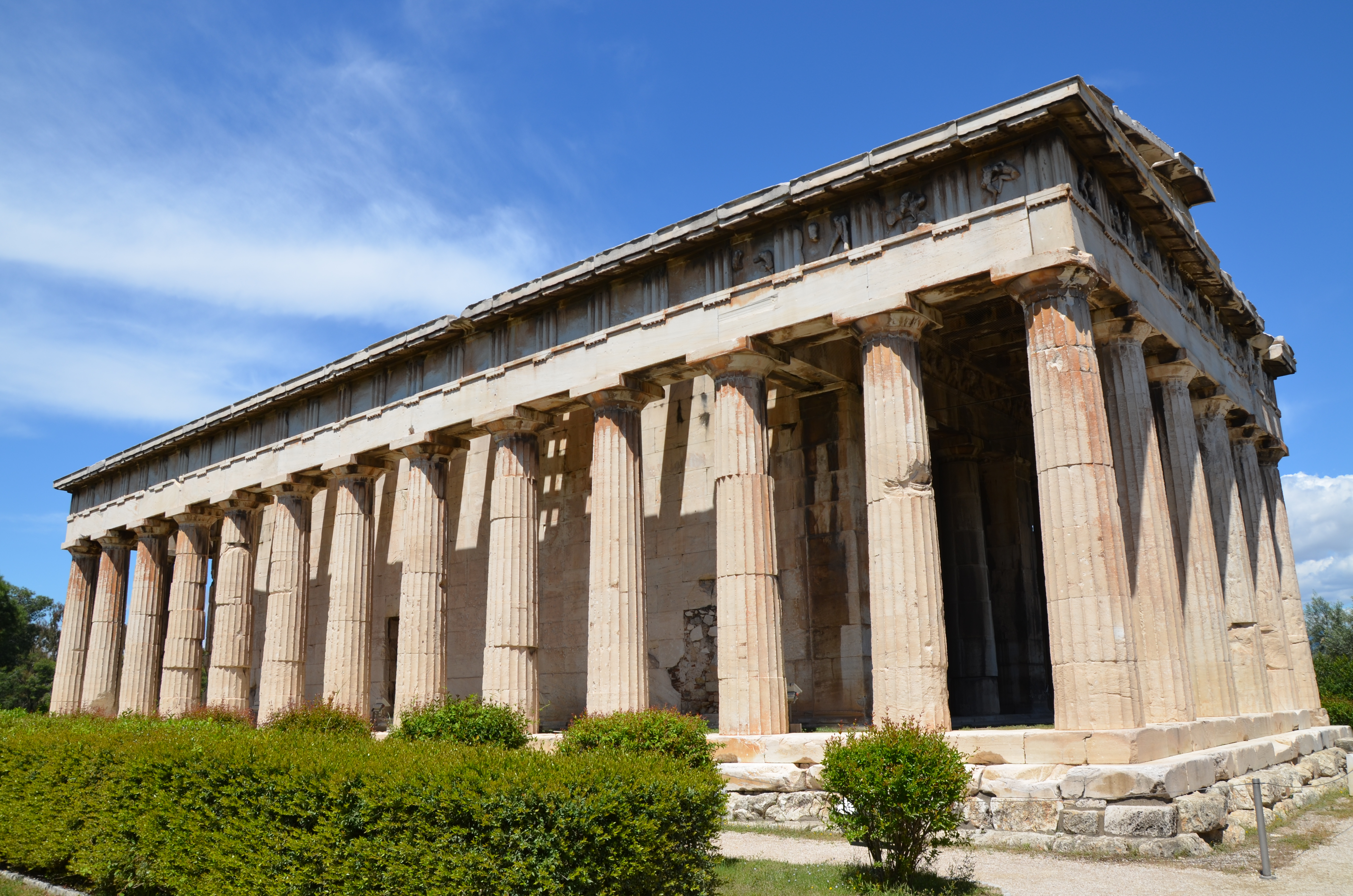
The Temple of Hephaestus

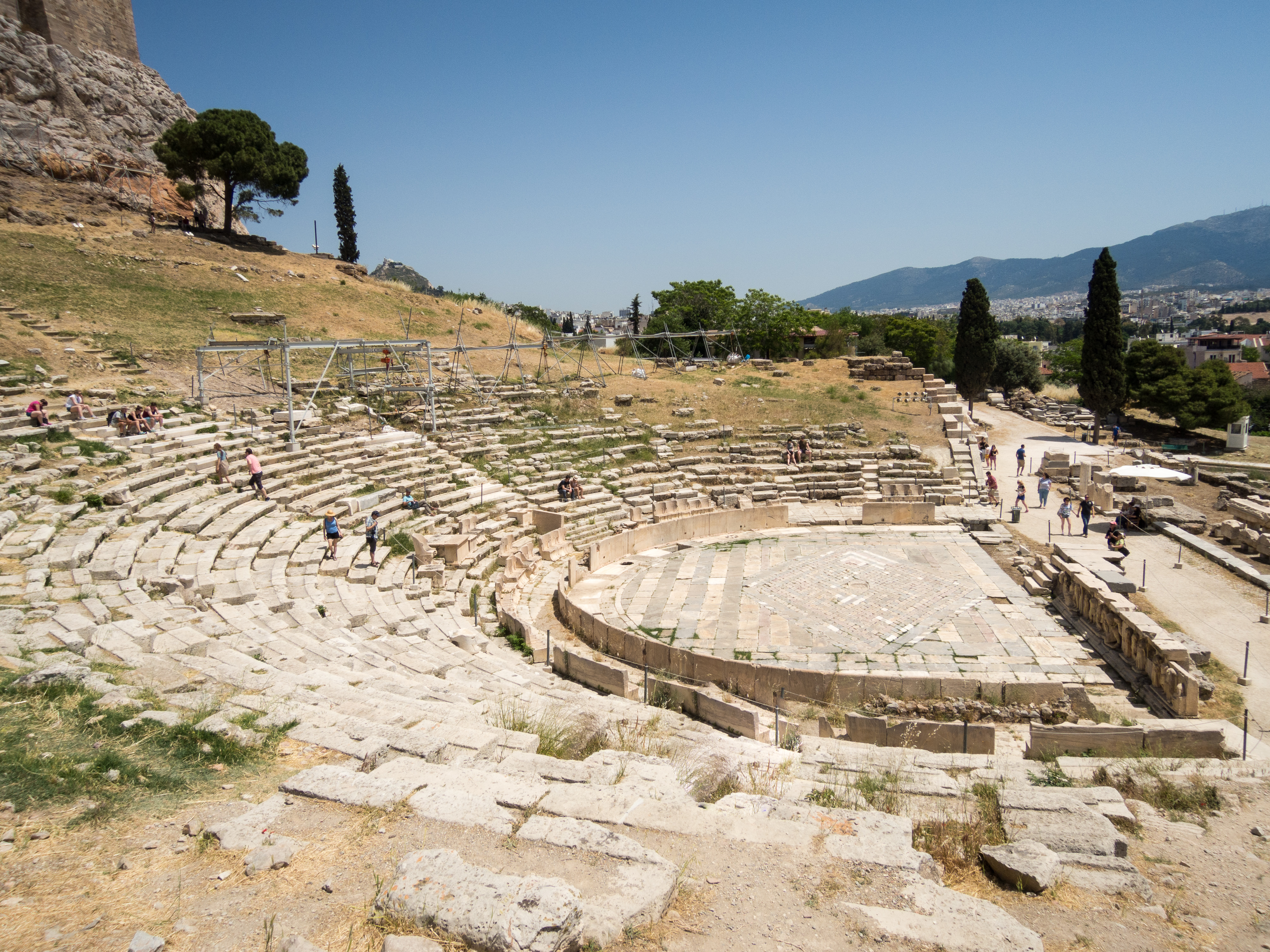
Theatre of Dionysus

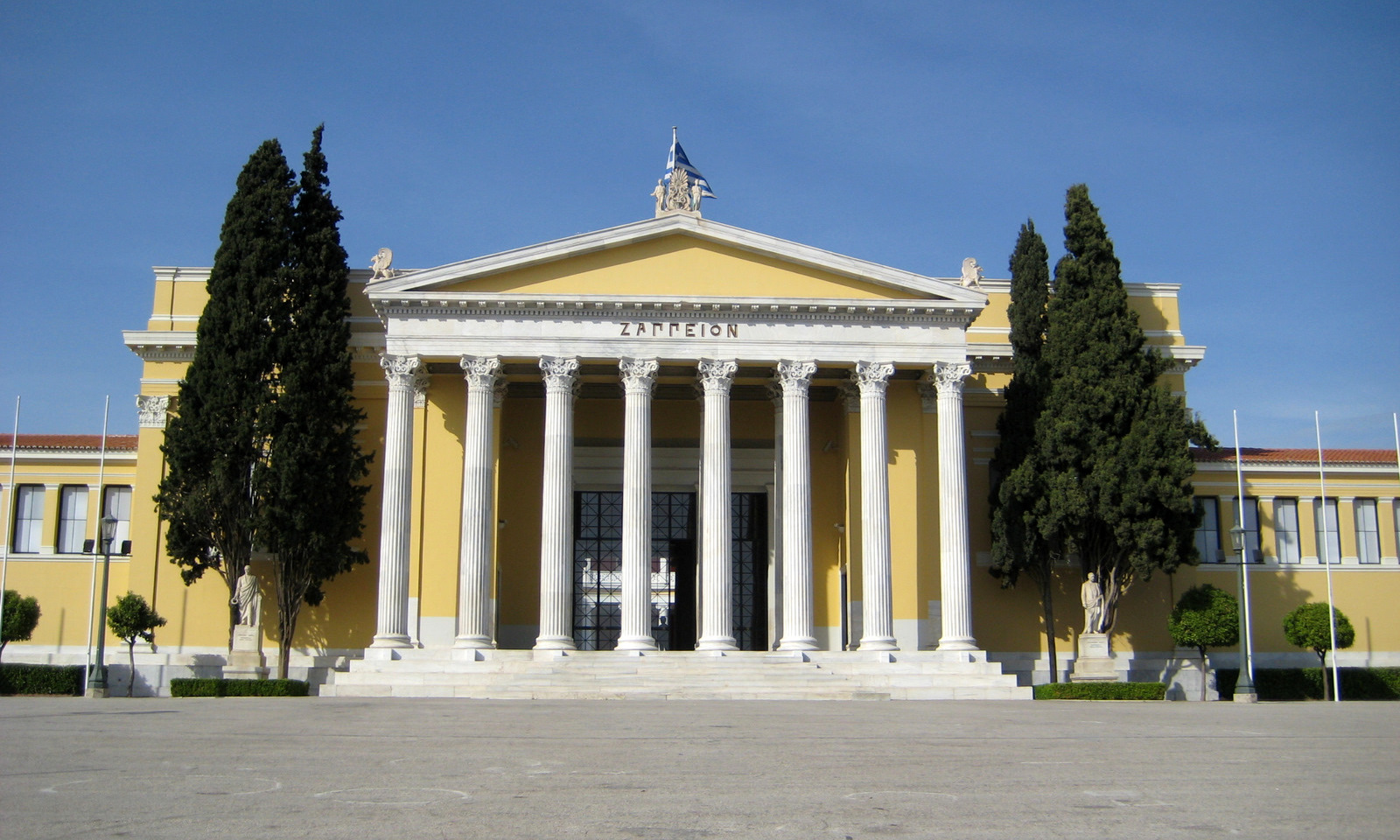
The Zappeion, a Conference and Exhibition Centre in Neoclassical style

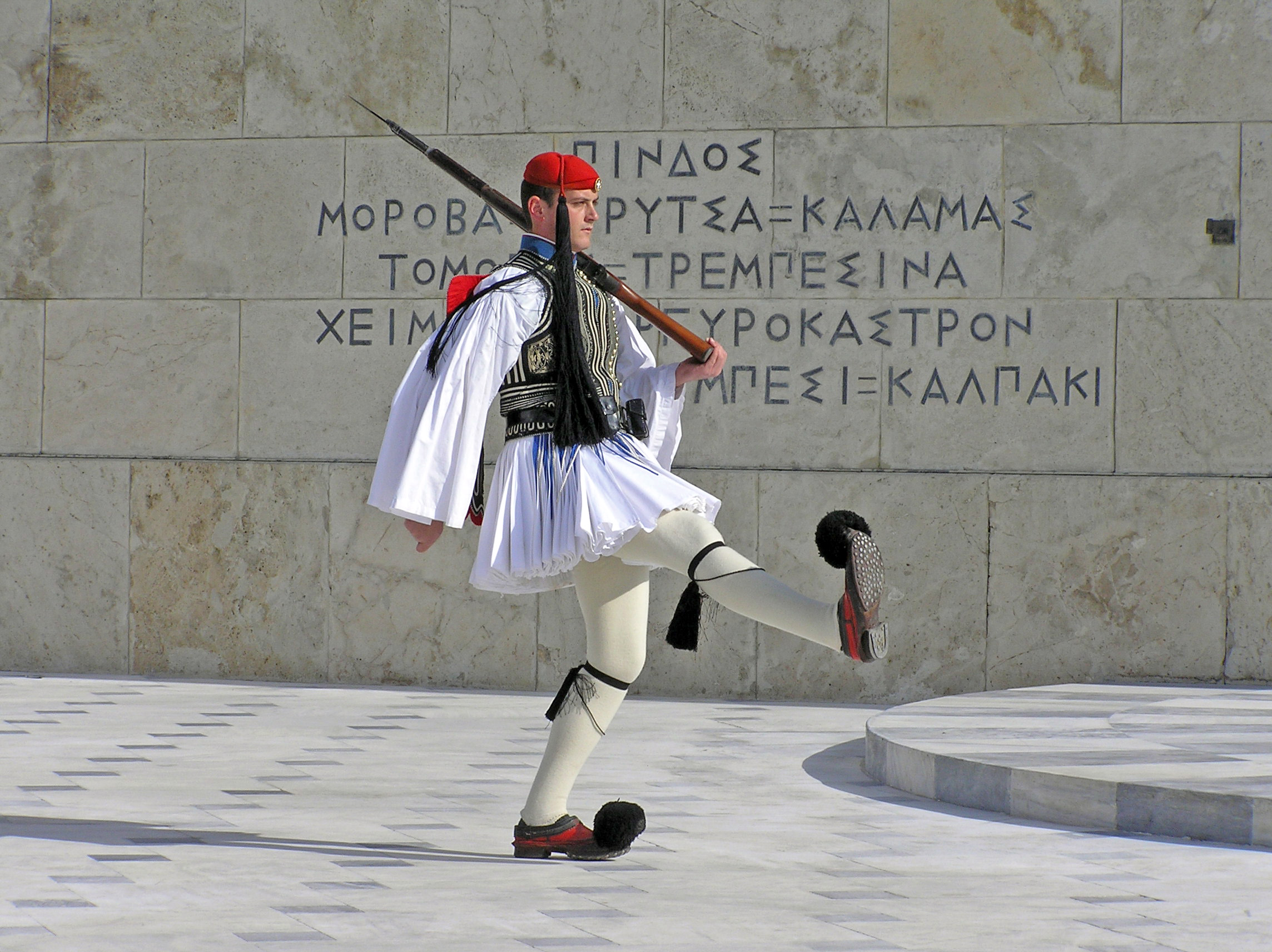
Evzone guarding the Tomb of the Unknown Soldier

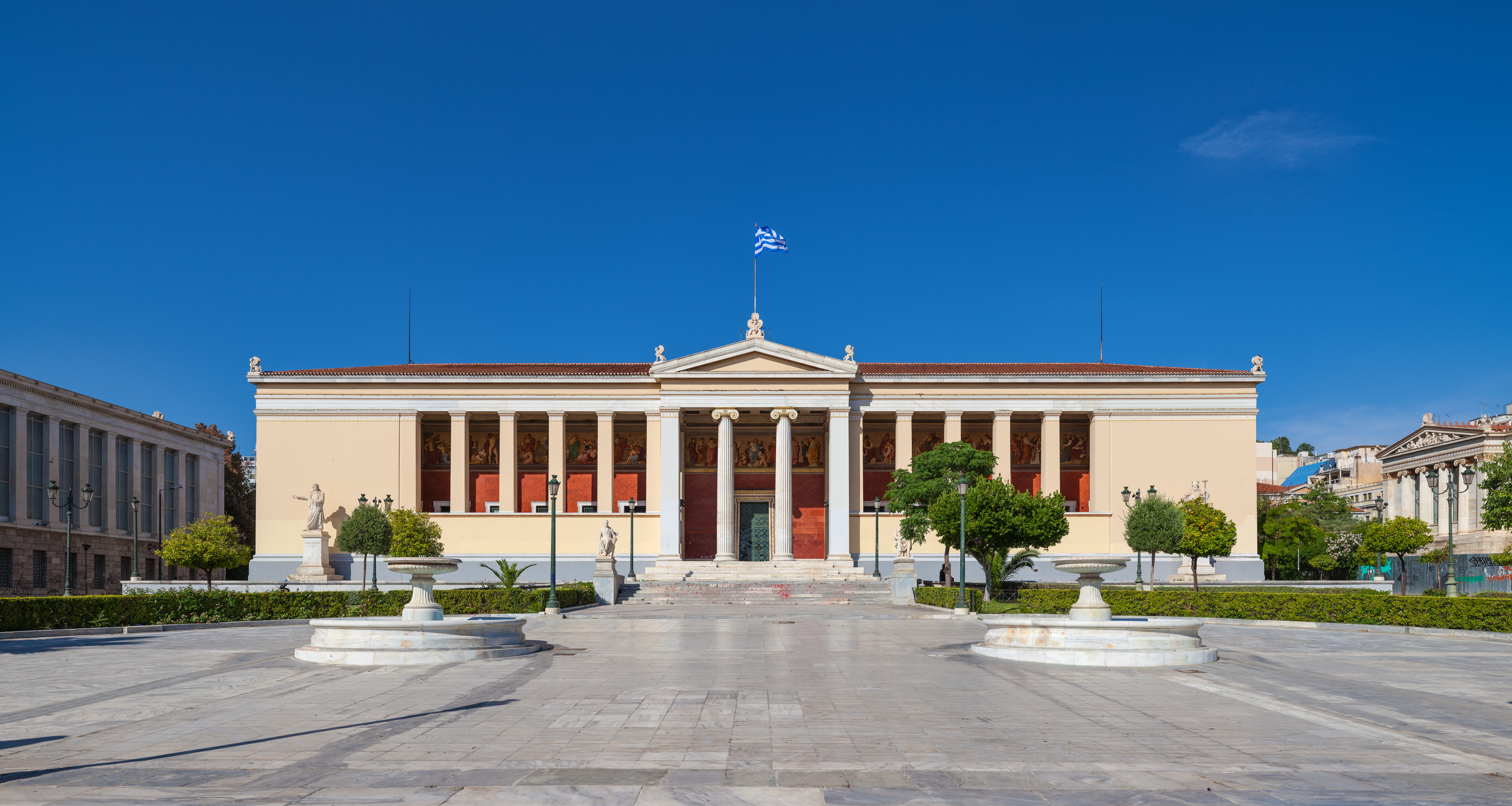
The National Archaeological Museum

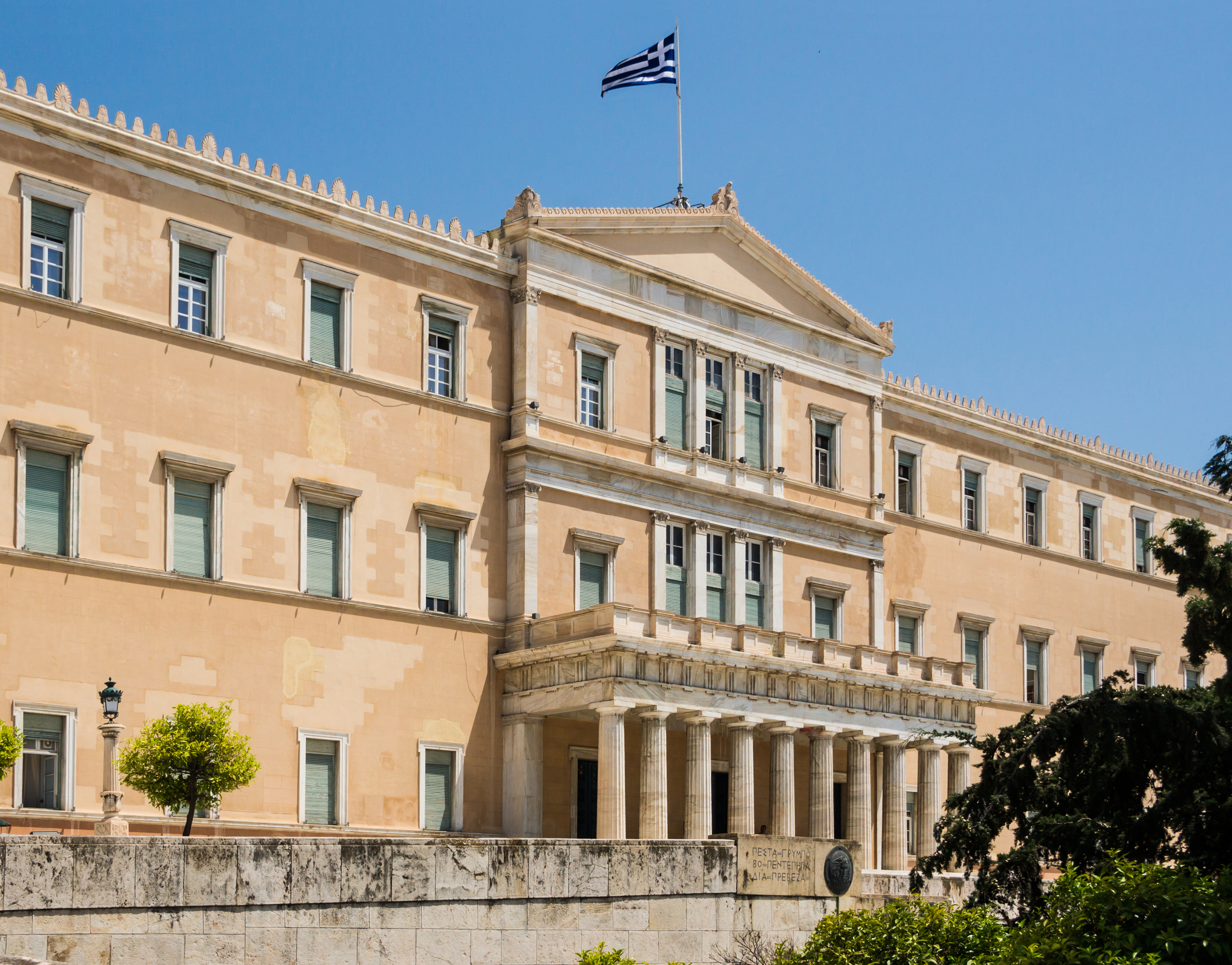
The Old Royal Palace

- Tourist attractions
  - Museums in Athens
  - Shopping areas and markets

==== Ancient monuments in Athens ====
- Acropolis
- Altar of the Twelve Gods
- Altar of Zeus Agoraios
- Ancient Agora
- Areopagus
- Aristotle's Lyceum
- Dipylon
- Hadrian's Library
- Monument of Lysicrates
- Philopappos Monument
- Platonic Academy
- Remains of the Acharnian Road, Acharnian Gate and Cemetery Site
- Remains of the Long Walls
- Roman Agora
  - East Propylon
  - Gate of Athena Archegetis
  - Tower of the Winds
- Sacred Gate
- Stoa of Attalos
- Themistoclean Walls
- Ancient temples in Athens
  - Erechtheion
  - Parthenon
    - Older Parthenon
  - Temple of Apollo Patroos
  - Temple of Ares
  - Temple of Athena Nike
  - Temple of Hephaestus
  - Temple of Olympian Zeus
- Ancient theatres
  - Odeon of Herodes Atticus
  - Theatre of Dionysus
- Ancient triumphal arches in Athens
  - Arch of Hadrian

==== Churches in Athens ====
- Cathedral Basilica of St. Dionysius the Areopagite
- Church of St. Panteleimon of Acharnai
- Church of the Holy Apostles, Athens
- Metropolitan Cathedral of Athens

==== Cultural and exhibition centers in Athens ====
- Athinais Cultural Center
- City of Athens Cultural Center
- Stavros Niarchos Foundation Cultural Center
- Zappeion

==== Monuments and memorials in Athens ====
- Choragic Monument of Lysicrates
- Monument of the Eponymous Heroes
- Tomb of the Unknown Soldier

==== Museums in Athens ====
- Acropolis Museum – opened in 2009, and replacing the old museum on the Acropolis, this museum has proved considerably popular; almost one million people visited during the summer period June–October 2009 alone. A number of smaller and privately owned museums focused on Greek culture and arts are also to be found.
- Benaki Museum – with a branch for each of its collections including ancient, Byzantine, Ottoman-era, and Chinese art and beyond
- Byzantine and Christian Museum – one of the most important museums of Byzantine art
- Epigraphical Museum
- Goulandris Museum of Contemporary Art
- Goulandris Museum of Cycladic Art
- Jewish Museum of Greece – its collection describes the history and culture of the Greek Jewish community.
- Kerameikos Archaeological Museum – displays artifacts from the burial site of Kerameikos. Much of the pottery and other artifacts relate to Athenian attitudes towards death and the afterlife, throughout many ages.
- Municipal Gallery of Athens
- Museum of Cycladic Art – home to an extensive collection of Cycladic art, including its famous figurines of white marble
- Museum of Greek Folk Musical Instruments
- Museum of the City of Athens
- National Archaeological Museum – largest archaeological museum in the country, and one of the most important internationally. It contains a vast collection of antiquities, with artifacts covering a period of more than 5,000 years, from late Neolithic Age to Roman Greece.
- National Gallery
- National Historical Museum
- National Museum of Contemporary Art
- Numismatic Museum – houses a major collection of ancient and modern coins
- Syntagma Metro Station Archaeological Collection
- Athens War Museum

==== Palaces and villas in Athens ====
- Old Royal Palace
- Presidential Mansion
- Stathatos Mansion

==== Parks and gardens in Athens ====
- Attica Zoological Park
- Hellenikon Metropolitan Park
- National Gardens
- Pedion tou Areos

==== Public squares in Athens ====
- Avdi Square
- Kolonaki Square
- Kotzia Square
- Monastiraki
- Omonoia Square
- Syntagma

==== Streets of Athens ====
Streets in Athens

- Dionysiou Areopagitou Street
- Ermou Street
- Kifisias Avenue
- Panepistimiou Street
- Vasilissis Sofias Avenue
- Vouliagmenis Avenue

=== Demographics of Athens ===
Demographics of Athens

== Government and politics of Athens ==
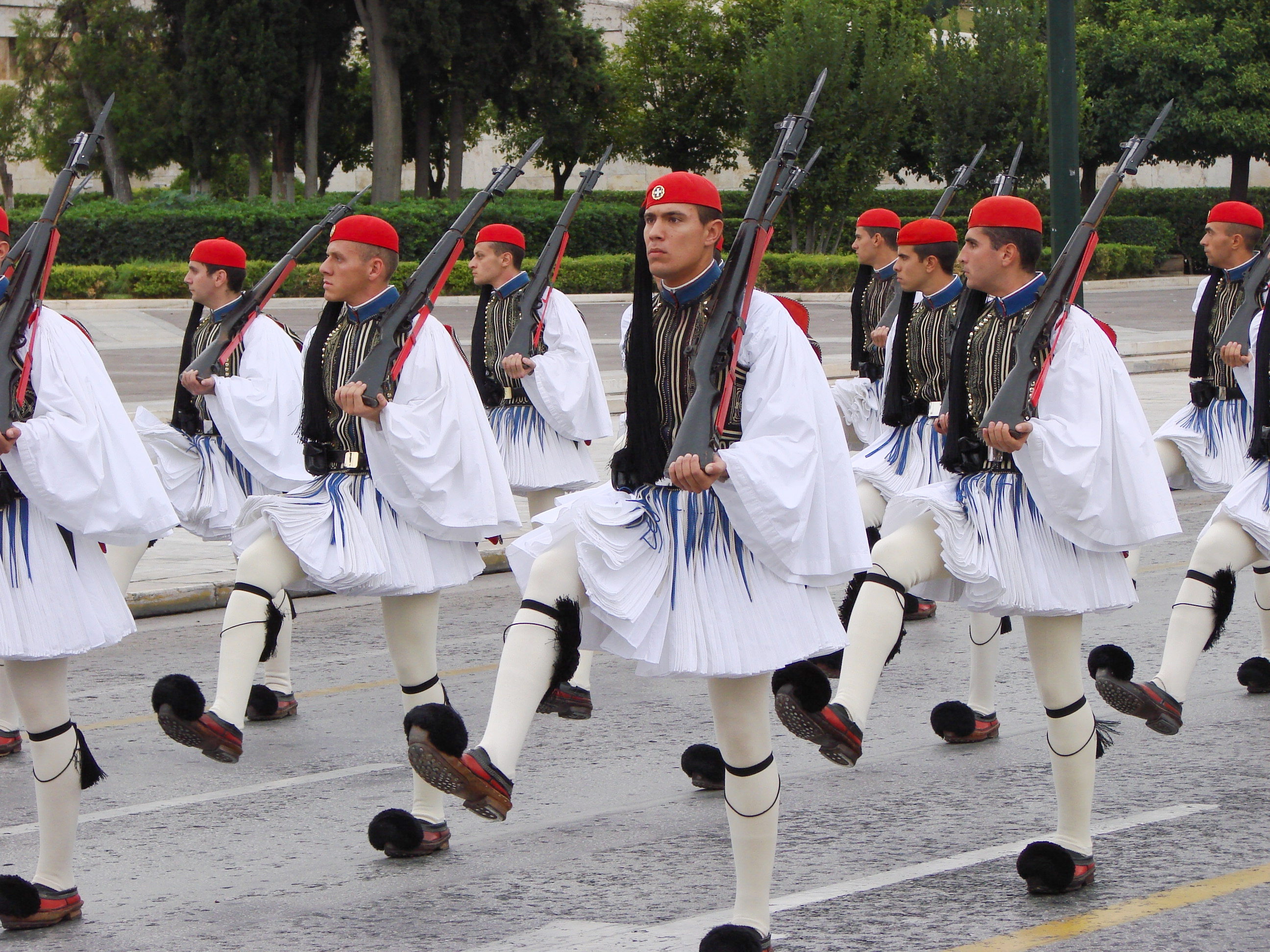
Evzones of the Presidential Guard wearing the traditional full dress uniform

Administration of Athens

- Mayor of Athens

=== Law and order in Athens ===
- Hellenic Police
- Presidential Guard

== History of Athens ==
History of Athens

=== History of Athens, by period or event ===
Timeline of Athens

- Athens during the Greek Dark Ages (c. 900 BC)
- Athens during the Archaic period (c. 800–480 BC)
  - Rise of the polis
- Solonian Constitution (594 BC)

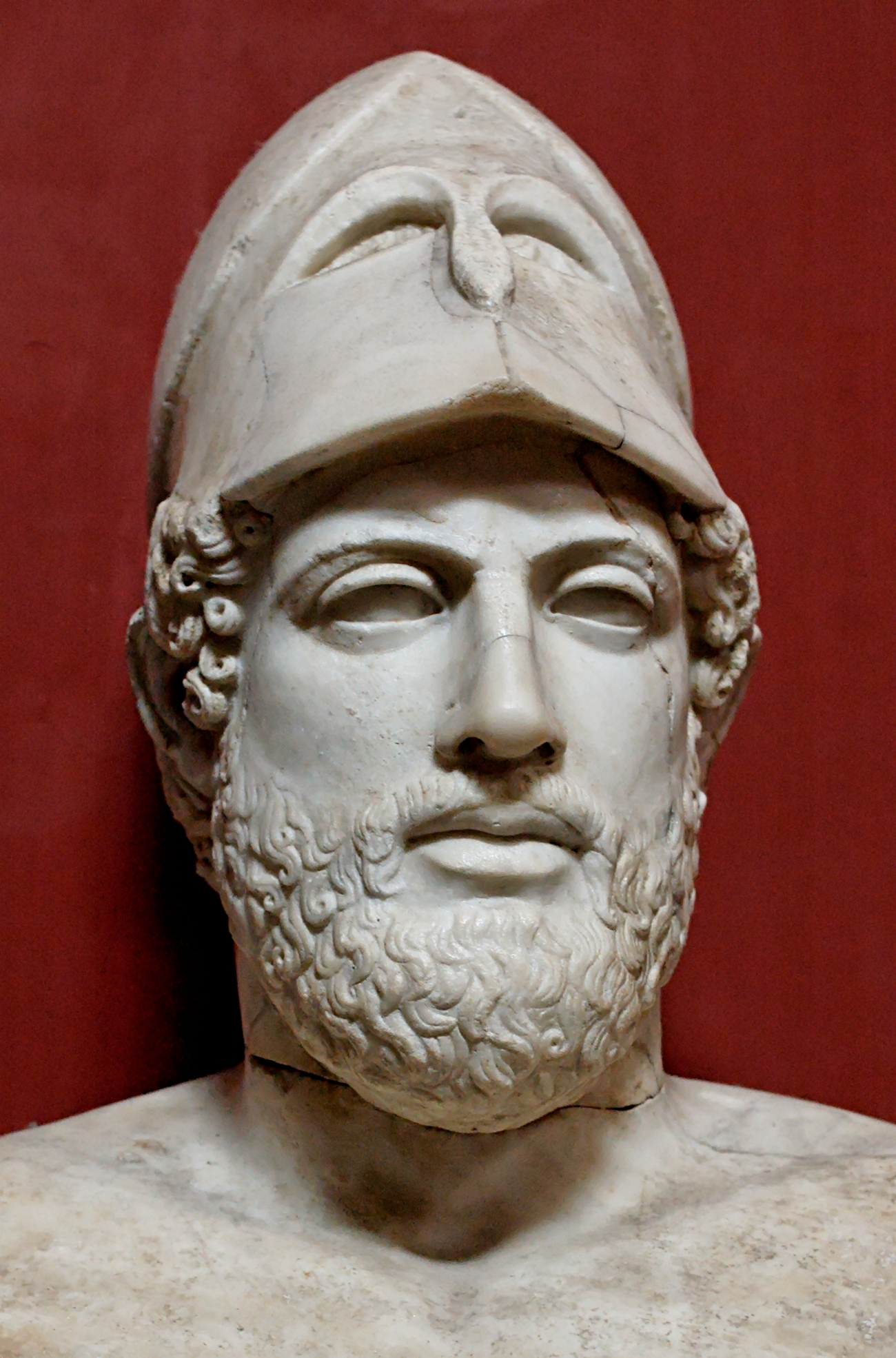
Pericles, prominent Greek statesman, orator and general during the Golden Age of Athens

- Classical Athens during the Classical period (508–322 BC)
  - Rise to power (508–448 BC)
    - Fifth-century Athens
      - Athenian democracy
        - Greco-Persian Wars (499–449 BC)
        - First Peloponnesian War (460–445 BC)
        - Athenian hegemony (448–430 BC) – the peak of Athenian hegemony was achieved in the 440s to 430s BC, known as the Age of Pericles.
        - Peloponnesian War (431–404 BC)
        - Plague of Athens (430 BC)
        - Athenian democracy was briefly overthrown by the coup of 411 BC.
  - Corinthian War (395–387 BC)
  - Athens under Macedon (355–322 BC)
- Hellenistic Athens during the Hellenistic period (323 BC–146 BC)
- Roman Athens (146 BC–330 AD) – following the Battle of Corinth (146 BC), Greece was absorbed into the Roman Republic as part of the Achaea Province, concluding 200 years of Macedonian supremacy. Under Rome, Athens was given the status of a free city.
- Byzantine Athens
- Latin Athens
  - Duchy of Athens (1204–1458)
- Ottoman Athens
  - Greek War of Independence (1821–1829) Independence from the Ottomans
- Modern Athens
  - Athens during the Greek Kingdom (1832–1924, 1935–1973)
    - Second Hellenic Republic (1924–1935)
- Athens during World War II
  - Axis occupation of Greece
  - Greek Resistance
  - Dekemvriana
- Athens today

=== History of Athens, by subject ===
- Battle of Athens (1941)
- Siege of the Acropolis (1821–22)
- Siege of the Acropolis (1826–27)

== Culture of Athens ==
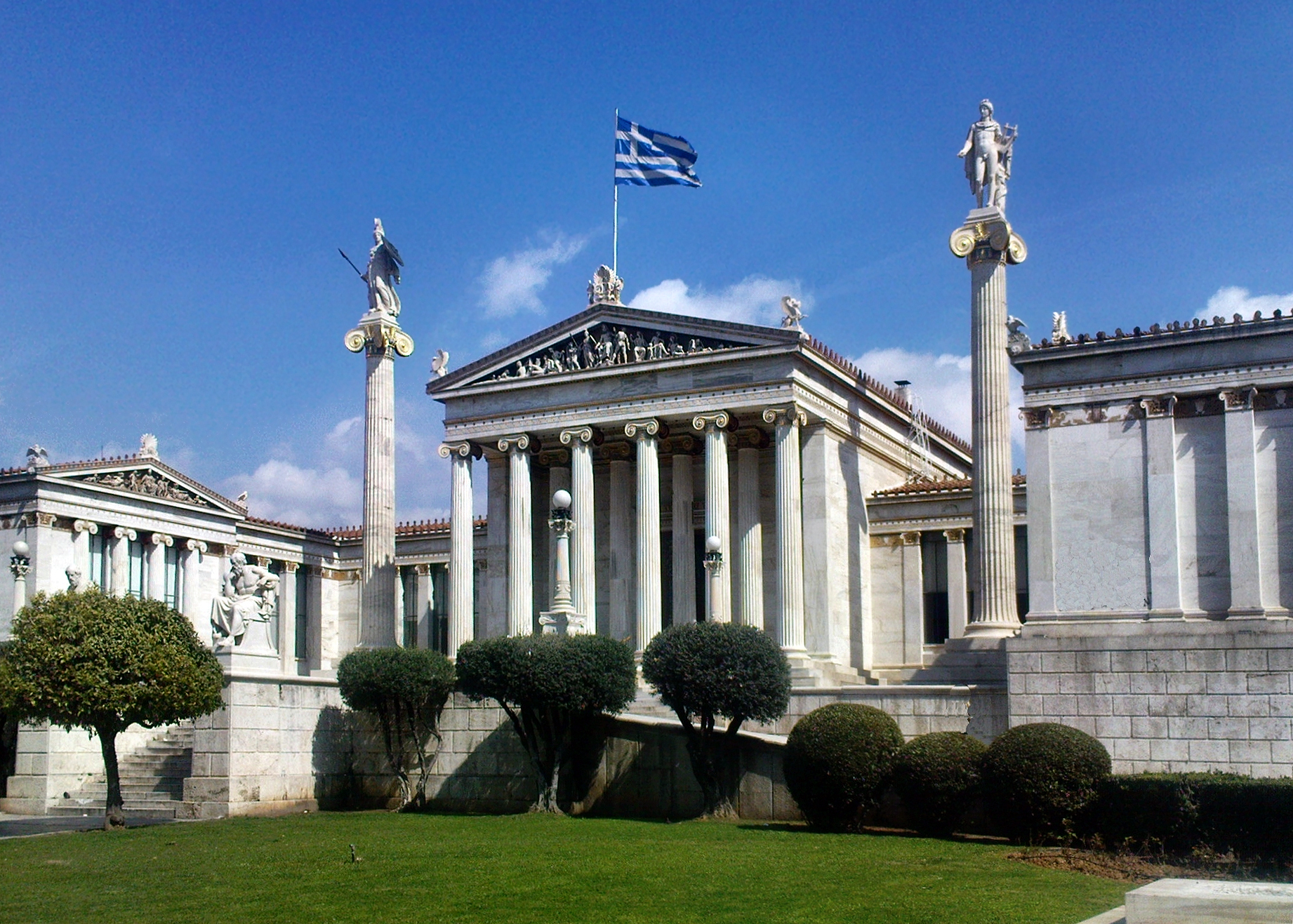
The Academy of Athens

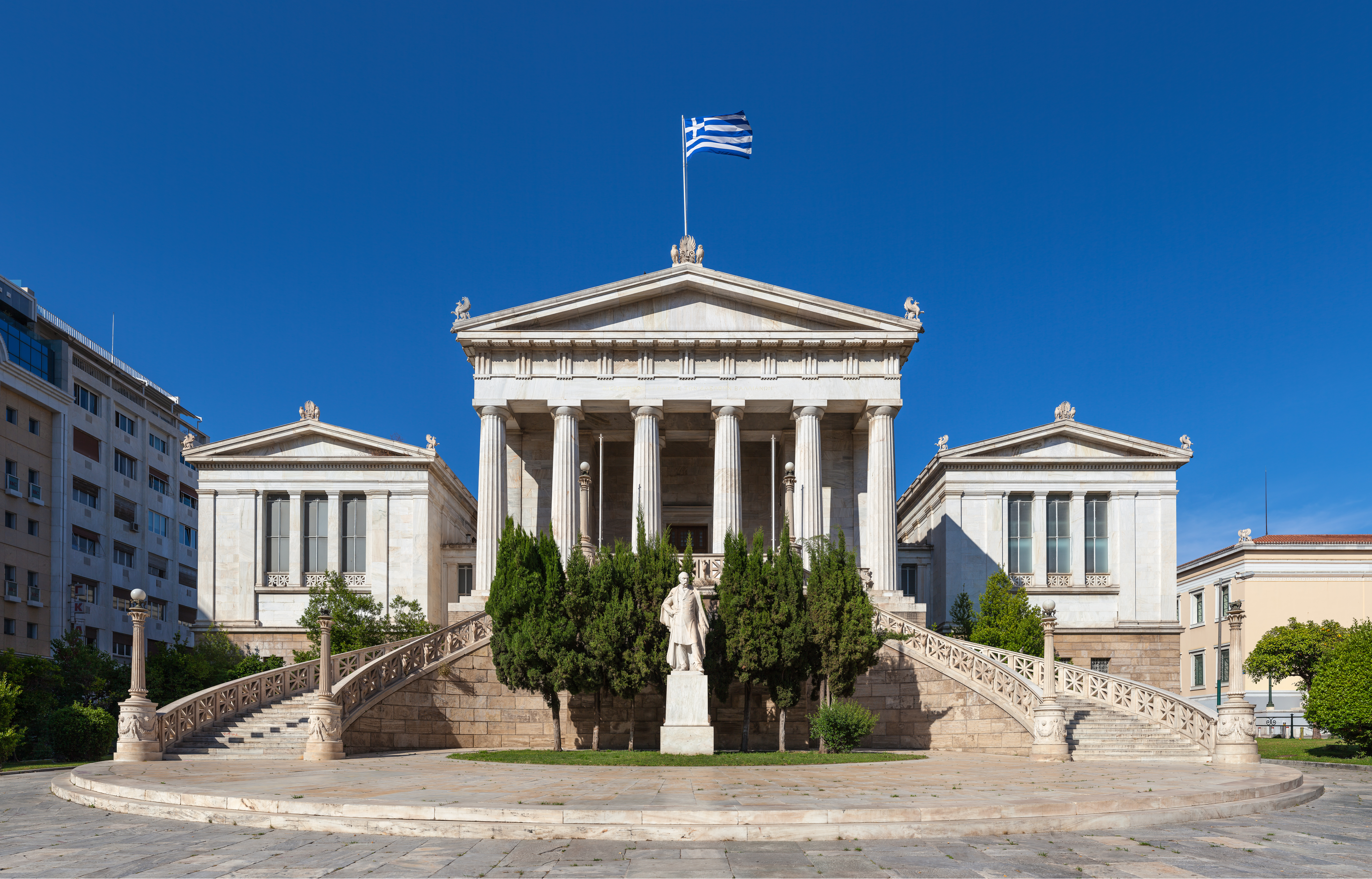
The National Library of Greece

Culture of Athens

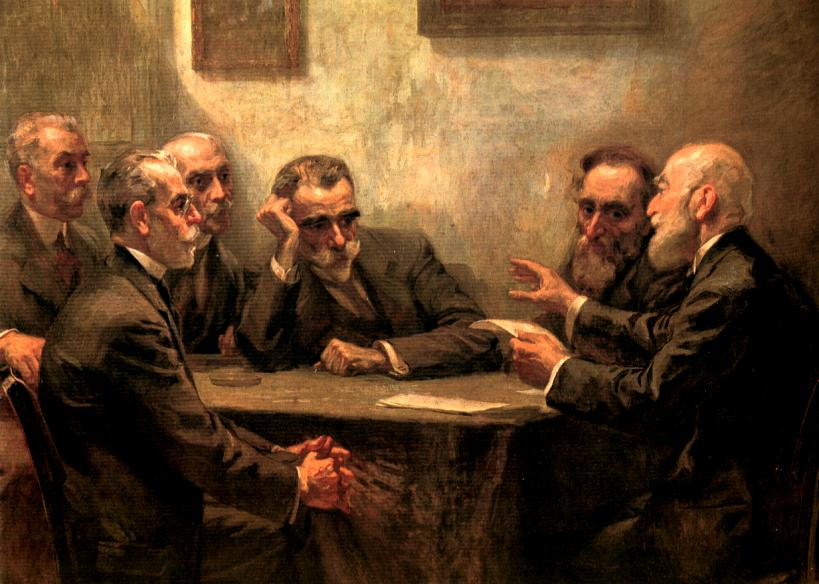
Parnassos Literary Society. From left: Georgios Stratigis, Georgios Drossinis, Ioannis Polemis, Kostis Palamas at the center, Georgios Souris and Aristomenis Provelengios, poets of the New Athenian School. Painting by Georgios Roilos

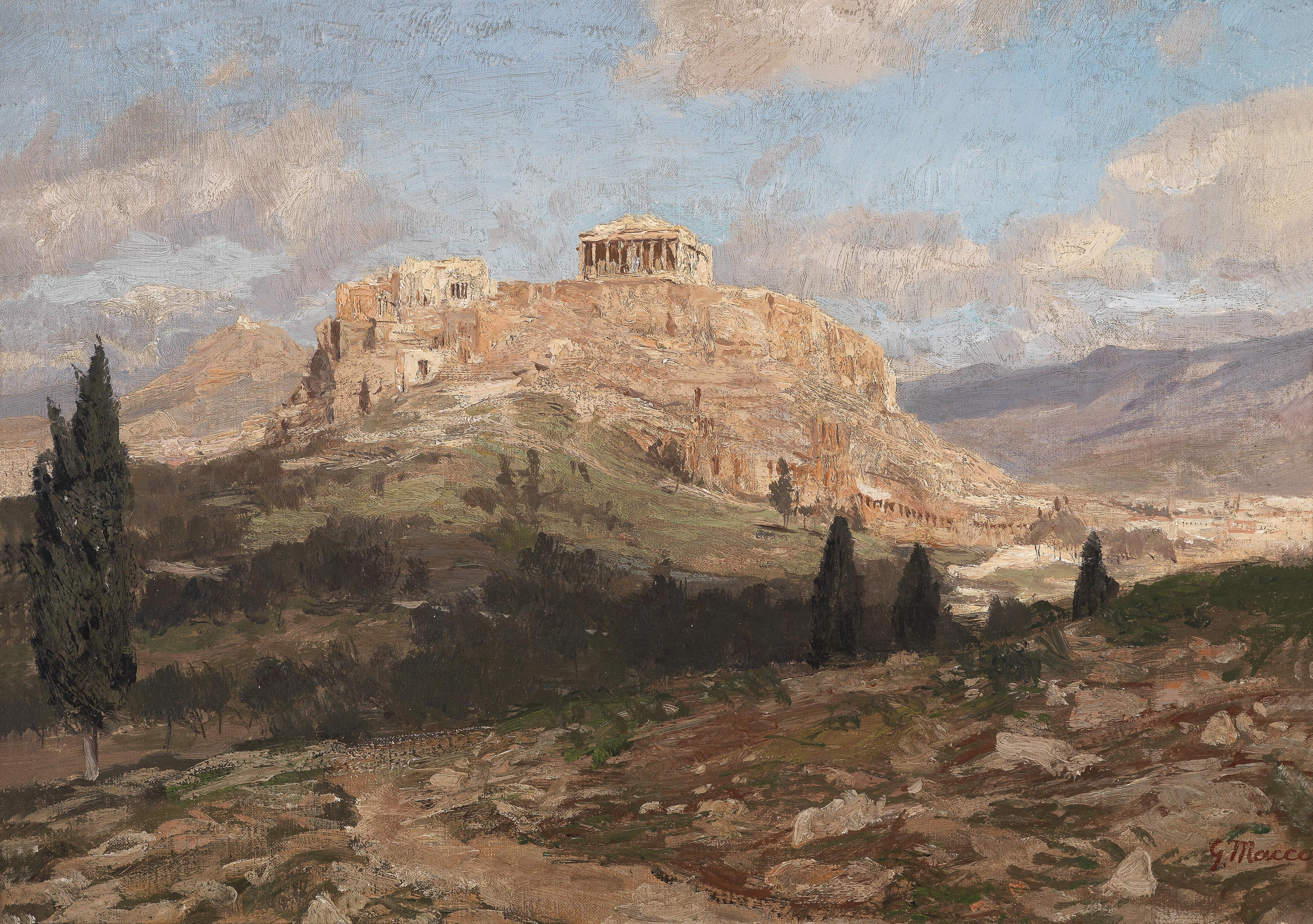
View of the Acropolis by Georg Macco, 1933

=== Arts in Athens ===
==== Architecture of Athens ====
Neoclassical architecture in Athens

- Athener Trilogie (Athenian Neoclassical Trilogy)
  - Academy of Athens
  - National Library of Greece
  - University of Athens

Modern architecture in Athens

- Landscaping of the Acropolis of Athens
- Tallest buildings in Athens
  - Athens Towers

==== Literature of Athens ====
- First Athenian School
- New Athenian School

==== Music of Athens ====
Music of Athens

- Athens Concert Hall
- Athens Conservatoire
- National Conservatoire

==== Theatre of Athens ====
Theatre in Athens

- National Theatre of Greece
  - National Theatre of Greece Drama School

==== Visual arts of Athens ====
Athens in art / Paintings of Athens

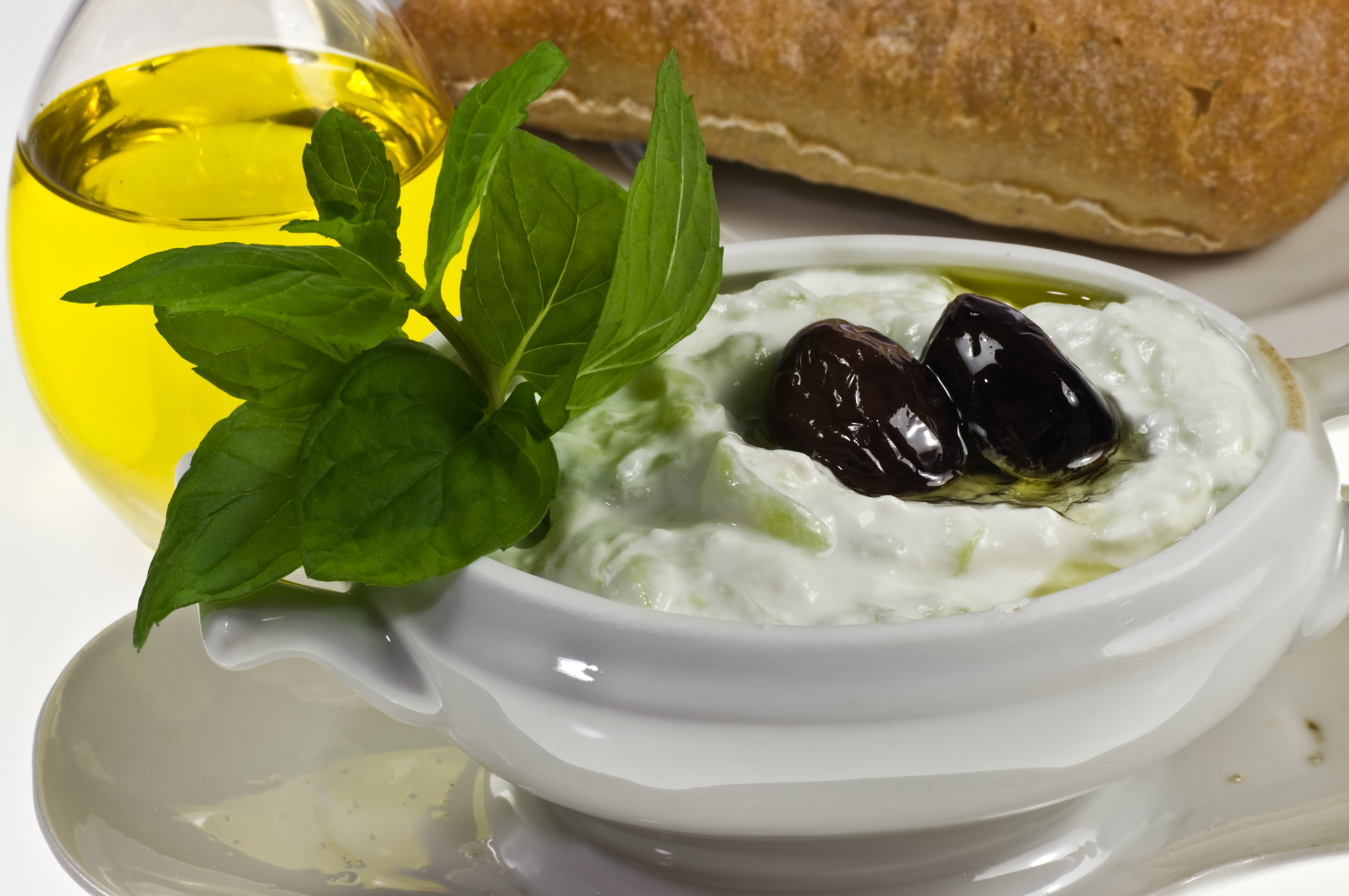
Tzatziki, a popular meze in Greece

Modern Greek art

- Contemporary Greek art

Cuisine of Athens

Events in Athens

- Athens Festival
- Athens International Motor Show

Media in Athens

- Newspapers in Athens
  - Ta Nea
  - To Vima
- Radio in Athens
- Television in Athens

People from Athens

- Athenians Project

=== Religion in Athens ===
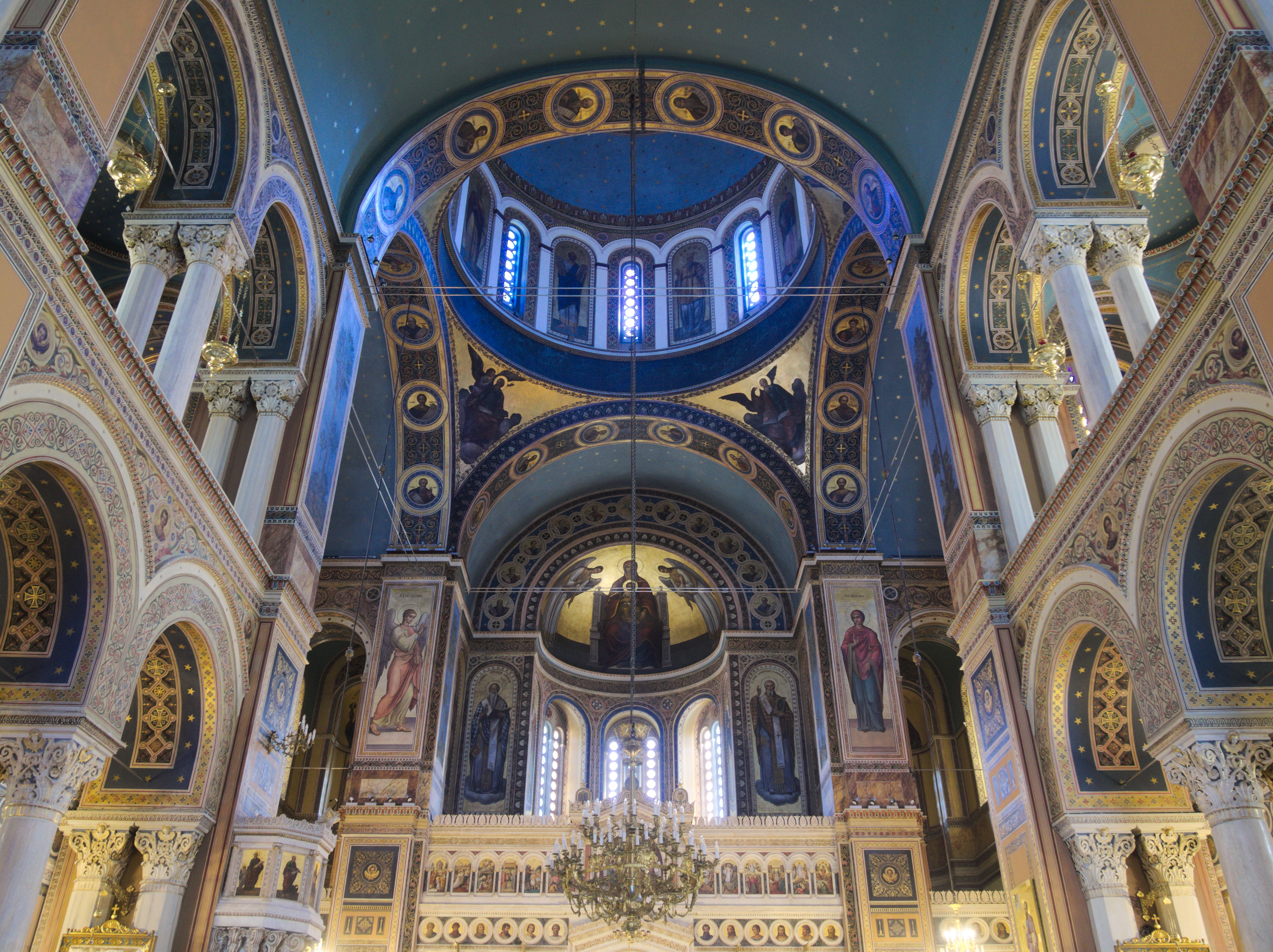
The Metropolitan Cathedral of Athens

- Catholicism in Athens
  - Roman Catholic Archdiocese of Athens
- Greek Orthodoxy in Athens
  - Archbishopric of Athens
    - Metropolitan Cathedral of Athens
- Islam in Athens
  - Votanikos Mosque

=== Sports in Athens ===
Opening ceremony of the 2004 Summer Olympics in Athen's Olympic Stadium

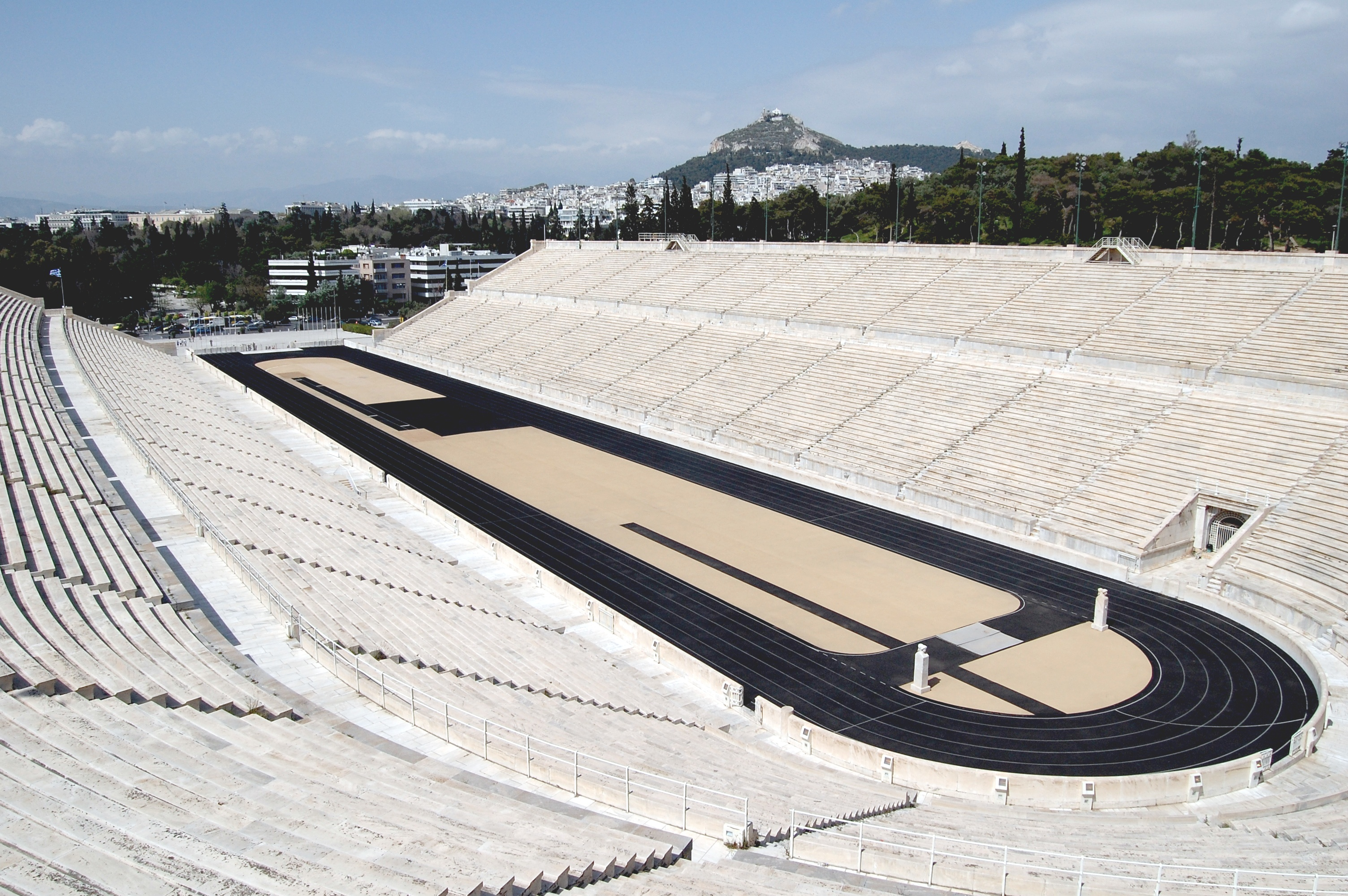
Panathenaic Stadium

Sports in Athens

- Basketball in Athens
  - AEK B.C.
  - Acropolis International Basketball Tournament
- Football in Athens
  - Athens Football Clubs Association
    - AEK Athens F.C.
    - A.O. Nea Ionia F.C.
    - Apollon Smyrnis F.C.
    - Atromitos F.C.
    - Panathinaikos F.C.
- Rugby football in Athens
  - Athens RFC
  - Attica Springboks RFC
- Olympics in Athens
  - Hellenic Olympic Committee
  - 1896 Summer Olympics
  - 2004 Summer Olympics
- Running in Athens
  - Athens Classic Marathon
  - Athens International Ultramarathon Festival
- Sports venues in Athens
  - Athens Olympic Sports Complex
  - Goudi Olympic Complex
  - Hellinikon Olympic Complex
  - Panathenaic Stadium

== Economy and infrastructure of Athens ==
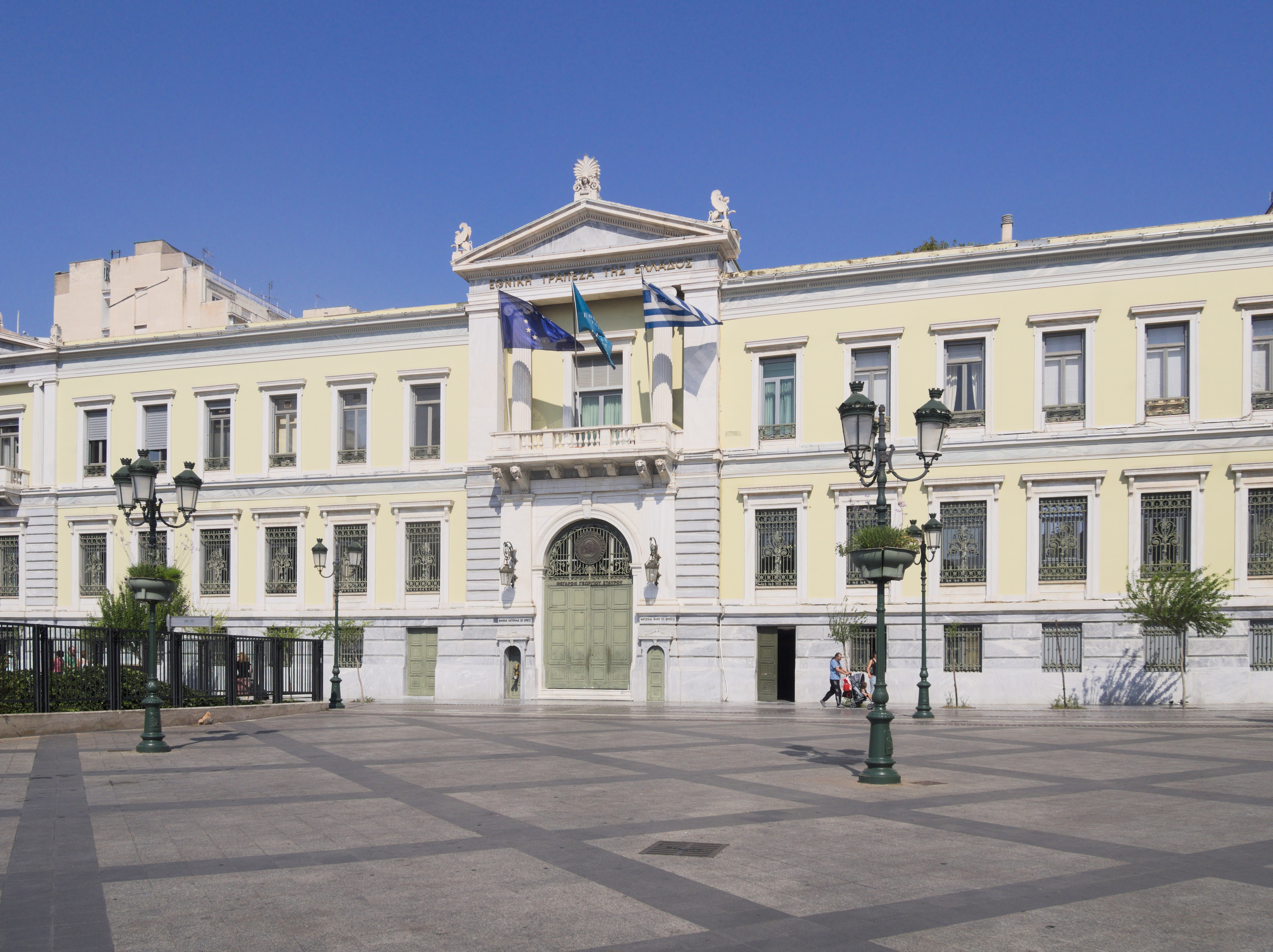
National Bank of Greece headquarters in Athens

Economy of Athens

- Financial services in Athens
  - National Bank of Greece
  - Athens Stock Exchange
    - Companies listed on the Athens Stock Exchange
- Hotels in Athens
  - Hilton Athens
  - Hotel Grande Bretagne
  - President Hotel Athens
- Restaurants in Athens
- Tourism in Athens

=== Transportation in Athens ===
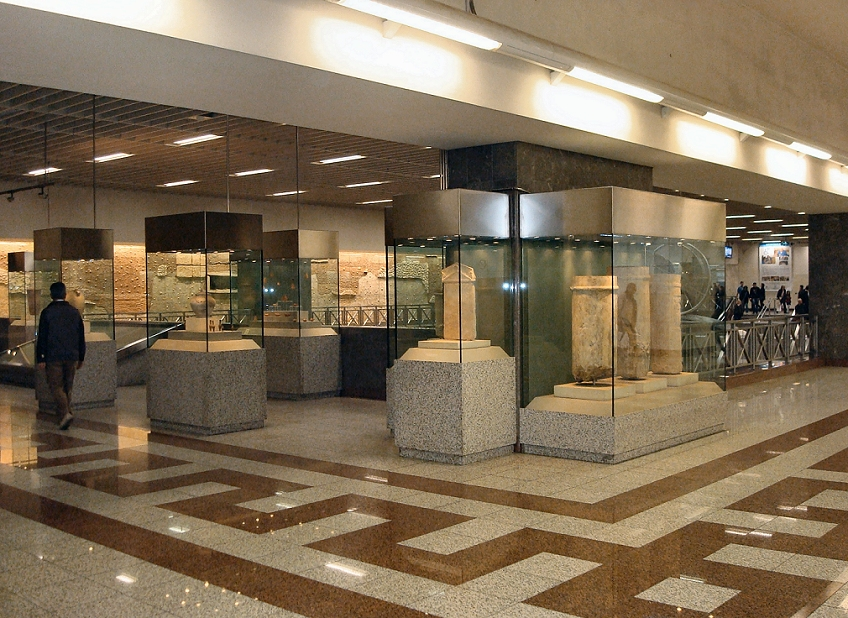
The Syntagma Metro Station Archaeological Collection

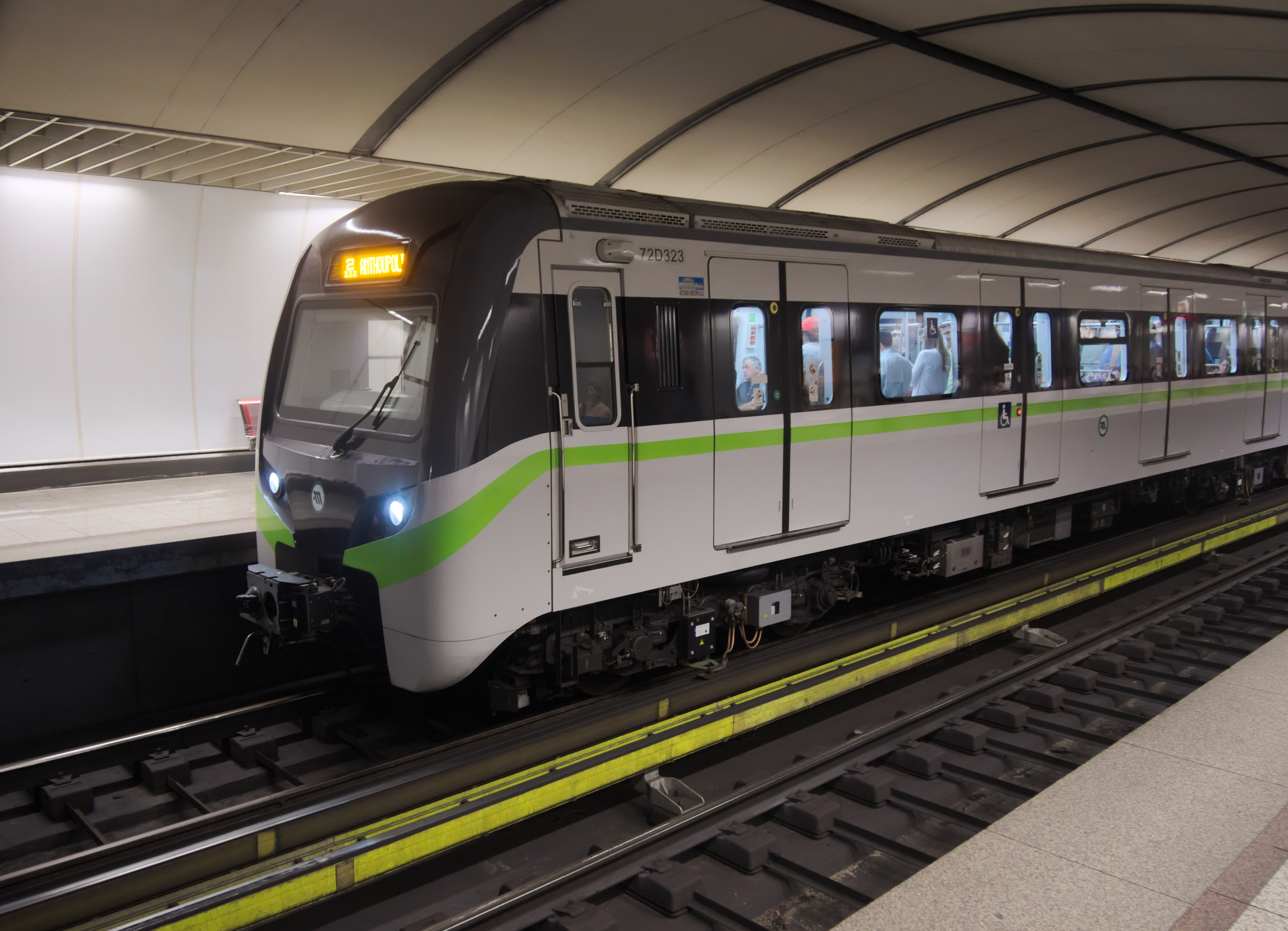
Metro train at Omonia metro station

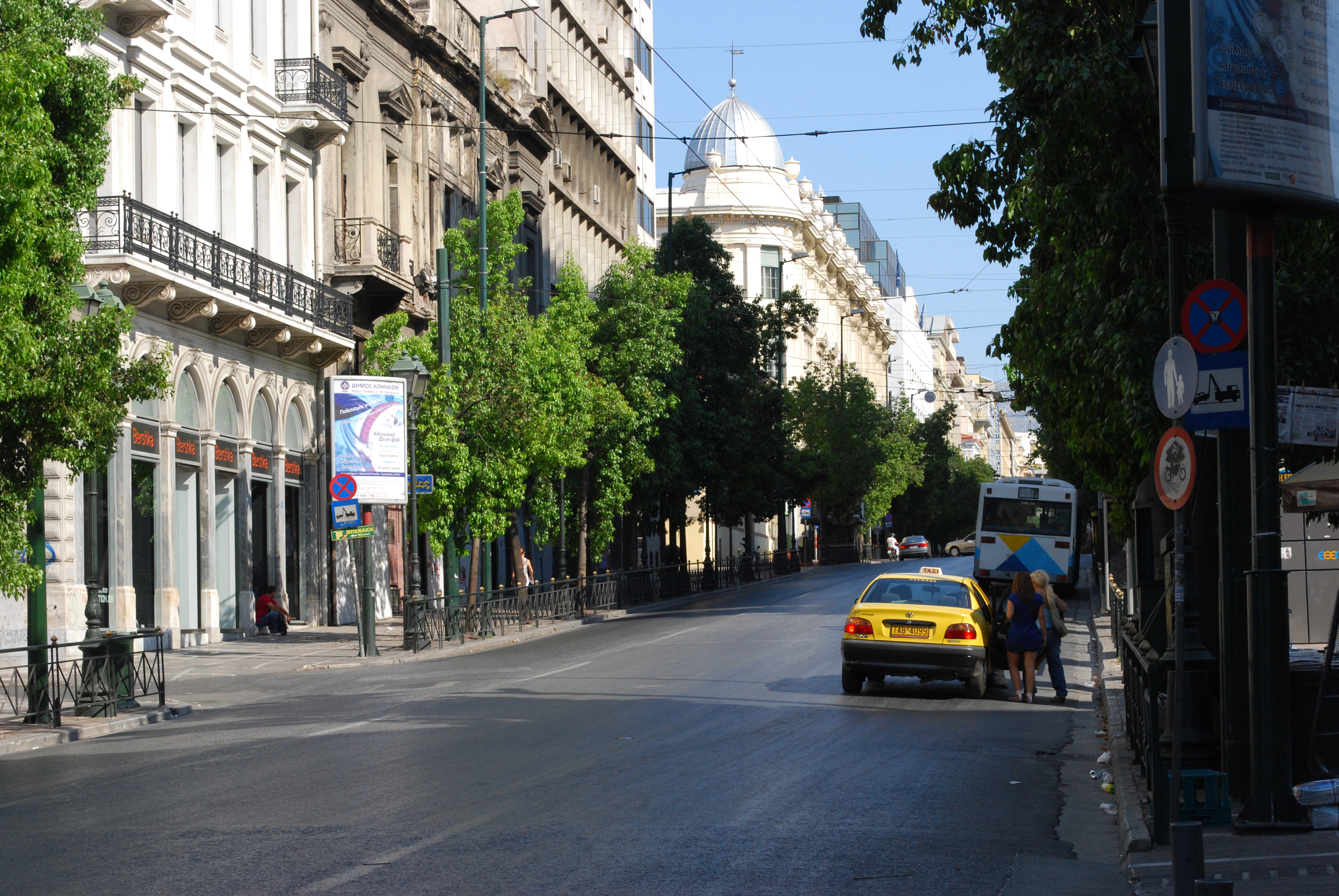
Stadiou Street

Transportation in Athens

- Public transport in Athens
  - Transport for Athens
- Air transport in Athens
  - Airports in Athens
    - Athens International Airport

==== Rail transport in Athens ====
Rail transport in Athens

- Athens railway station
- Athens Suburban Railway
  - Line A1
  - Line A2
  - Line A3
  - Line A4
- Athens Metro
  - Line 1
    - Athens–Piraeus Electric Railways
  - Line 2
  - Line 3
  - Line 4
  - List of Athens Metro stations
- Trams in Athens
  - Athens Tram (2004–present)
    - List of Athens Tram stops
  - Trams in Athens (1882–1960)
  - Piraeus-Perama light railway (1936–1977)

==== Road transport in Athens ====
Road transport in Athens

- Bus transport in Athens
- Highways in Athens
  - Motorways in Athens
    - A1 motorway (E75) – connects Athens to Lamia, Larissa, and Thessaloniki
    - A6 motorway (E94) – connects Athens eastward to Athens International Airport, and westward to Elefsina, Corinth, and Patras (via the A8 motorway)
    - A62 motorway – the Hymettus Ring Road that runs east of the city
    - A621 motorway – a short motorway near Gerakas, connecting the A6 with the A62
  - National roads in Athens
    - EO1 – towards Lamia, Larissa, Katerini and Evzonoi
    - EO8 – towards Corinth and Patras
    - EO54 – towards Rafina
    - EO56 – towards Piraeus
    - EO83 – towards Rafina via Kifissia and Marathon
    - EO91 – towards Sounion
    - Vouliagmenis Avenue
- Streets in Athens

== Education in Athens ==
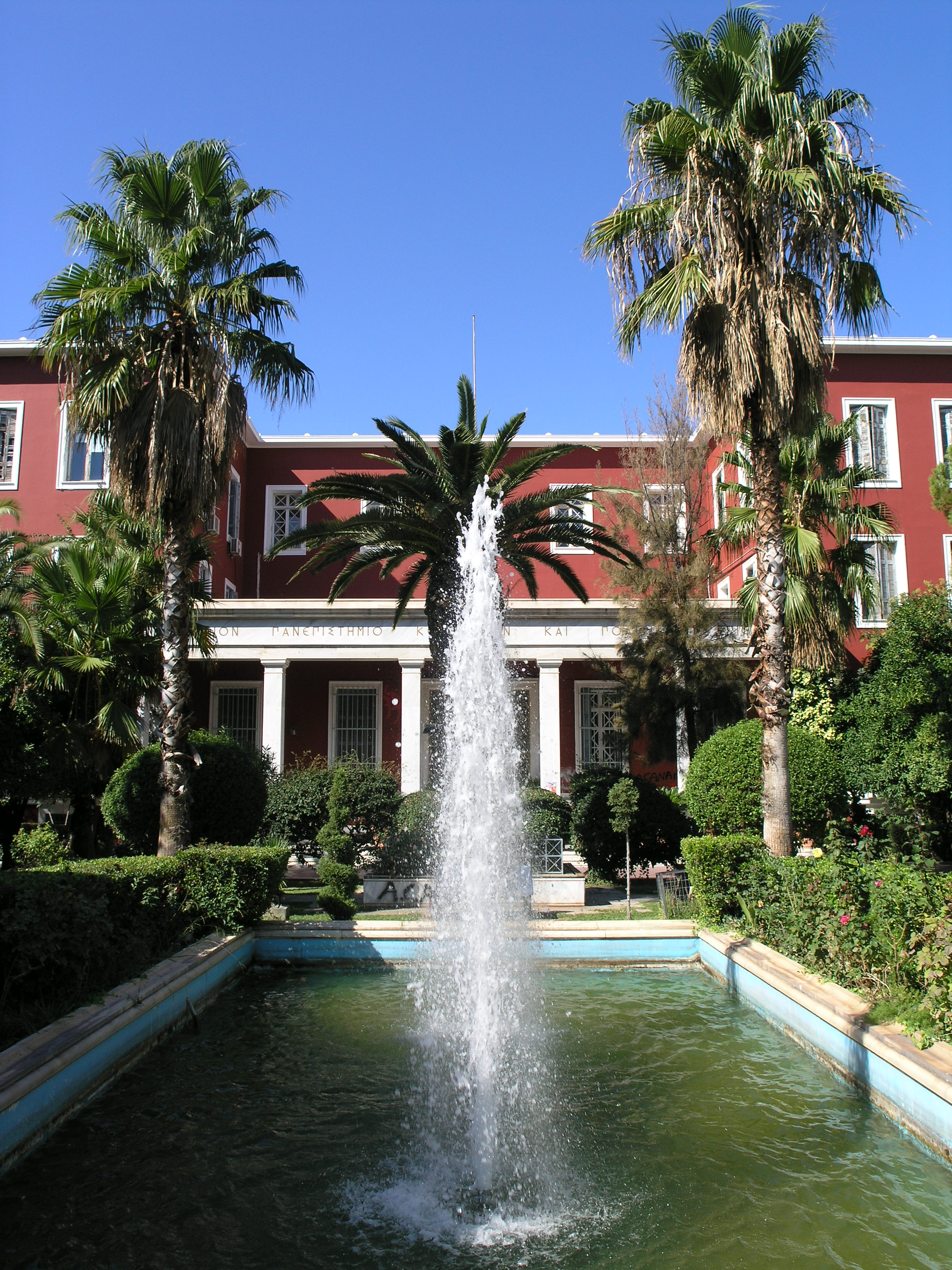
The first, historic building of the Panteion University

Education in Athens

- Academy of Athens
- Universities in Athens
  - Athens University of Economics and Business
  - Agricultural University of Athens
  - National and Kapodistrian University of Athens
  - National Technical University of Athens
  - Panteion University
  - Harokopio University of Athens
  - University of Piraeus
  - Athens School of Fine Arts
  - University of West Attica

== Healthcare in Athens ==
Hospitals in Athens

- Evangelismos Hospital

== See also ==
- Outline of geography
