= Aerides, Athens =

Aerides Αέρηδες
- Neighborhood
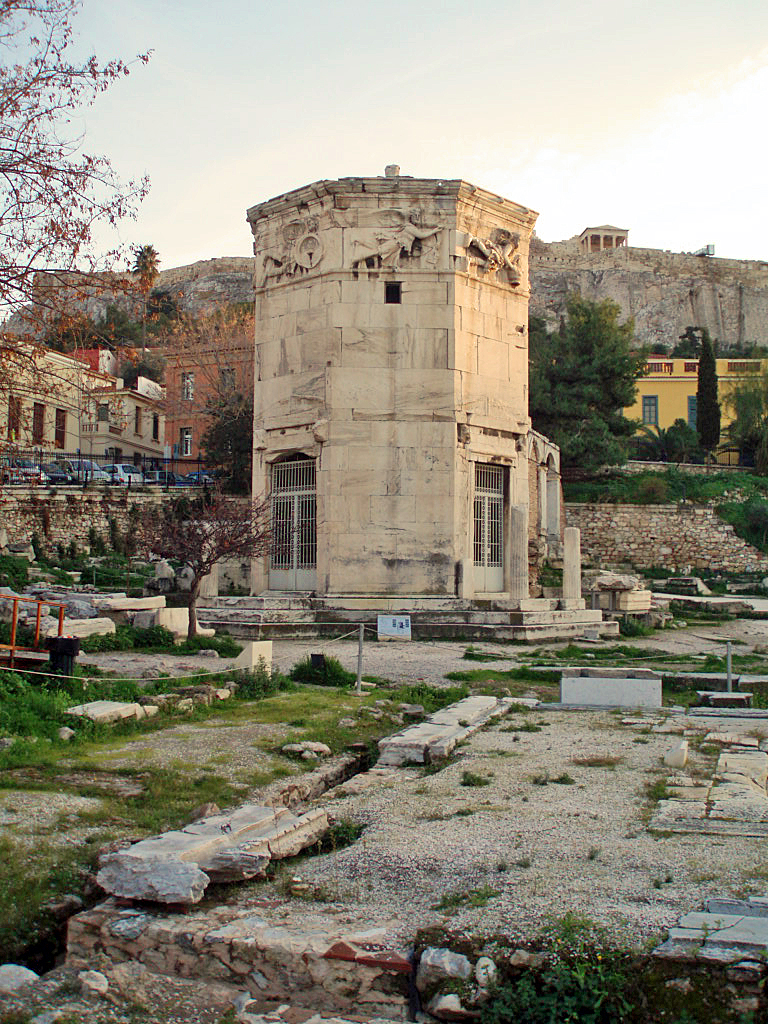
- The Tower of the Winds

- Location within municipality of Athens
- Coordinates: 37°58′28″N 23°43′37″E
- Country: Greece
- Region: Attica
- City: Athens
- Postal code: 105 55, 105 56
- Area code: 210
- Website: www.cityofathens.gr

Aerides (Greek: Αέρηδες pronounced [aˈe.ɾi.ðes]) is a small neighborhood of the center of Athens, Greece surrounding the Tower of the Winds, from where it takes its name. It is a subdivision of Plaka.

== History ==
Aerides was considered the centre of Athens during the reign of King Otto (1832-62). A market was located here and the so-called 'Plane Tree Square' (πλατεία του πλατάνου) which was a barracks in which the Bavarian Army camped. Aiolou Street starts at the small park in which the Tower of the Winds is located and at the crossroads with Ermou Street was where most of the city's commercial traffic gathered. To the north, a market called Abatzidika opened, dealing in coarse fabrics.

The Madrasa of Athens (Μεντρεσές Αθηνών) is found on the north side of the park in which the Tower is located. This Islamic holy school became a prison during Otto's reign. Those who were being executed used to greet the plane tree in the adjacent square named after it. This is the origin of the Greek phrase "Greet the plane tree for us" (χαιρέτα μας τον πλάτανο), said when someone doesn't believe what the speaker has said will happen.

With the move of military quarters elsewhere, over time this once busy neighbourhood became quiet. On 1 May 1965, Aerides became part of Plaka, which it remains to the present day.

== Aerides Bath ==
The Aerides Bath (Λουτρό των Αέρηδων) is a hammam (Turkish bathhouse) left over from the Ottoman rule. The bath remained opened until 1965.

== Transport ==
Monastiraki metro station on Line 1 and Line 3 is the nearest station of the Athens Metro.
