= Petralona =

Petralona Πετράλωνα
- Neighborhood
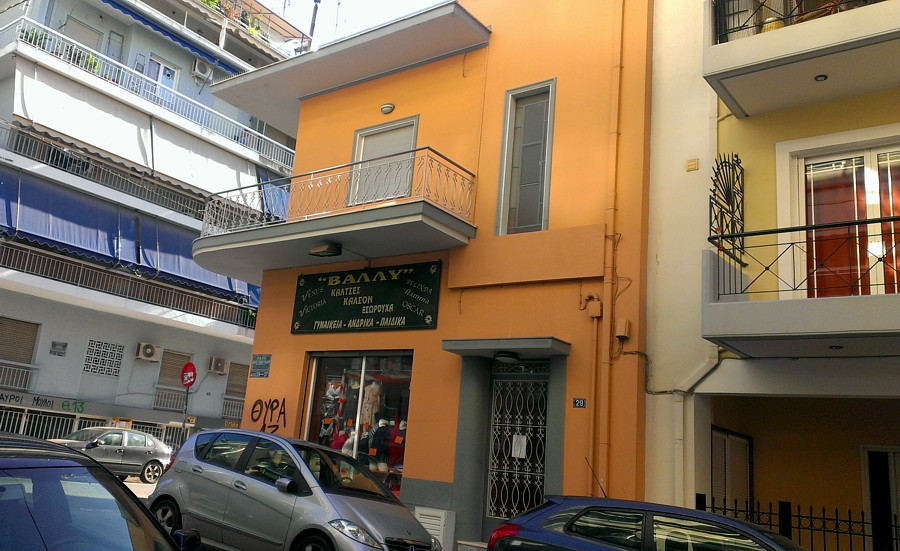
- Apartments in Petralona

- Location within Athens municipality
- Coordinates: 37°58′02″N 23°42′35″E
- Country: Greece
- Region: Attica
- City: Athens
- Postal code: 118 51, 118 52, 118 53, 118 54
- Area code: 210
- Website: www.cityofathens.gr

Petralona (Greek: Πετράλωνα, pronounced [peˈtɾa.lo.na]) is a neighborhood of the center of Athens, Greece. Athenians further subdivide the area into Ano (Upper) Petralona or Kato (Lower) Petralona, where Ano Petralona is the area between the Philopappos Hill and the railway and Kato Petralona the area between the railway and Piraeus Street. Sometimes, Ano Petralona include the small neighbourhood of Assyrmatos.

== History ==
Petralona is named after the Greek words 'Petrina Alonia' (πέτρινα αλώνια) which means 'stone threshing floors', which were used in the area to thresh grain before urbanisation. The area was also known as Katsikadika (Greek: Κατσικάδικα), due to the presence of goat herders in the area who used to give out milk to the residents. Goats were banned from the city of Athens in February 1925 and from that point on, the area has held its current name.

== Amenities ==
The district is served by the station of the same name on Line 1 of the Athens Metro and it is also not that far from the Metro Station (Line 3) Kerameikos. There are also two buses that serve the area: bus 227 and bus 035, which connect Petralona with the rest of the city center.

Petralona hosts the football club Petralona F.C., founded in 1983, when the two local clubs AO Petralona and GS Petralona merged.
