= Asteroskopeio =

Asteroskopeio Αστεροσκοπείο
- Neighborhood
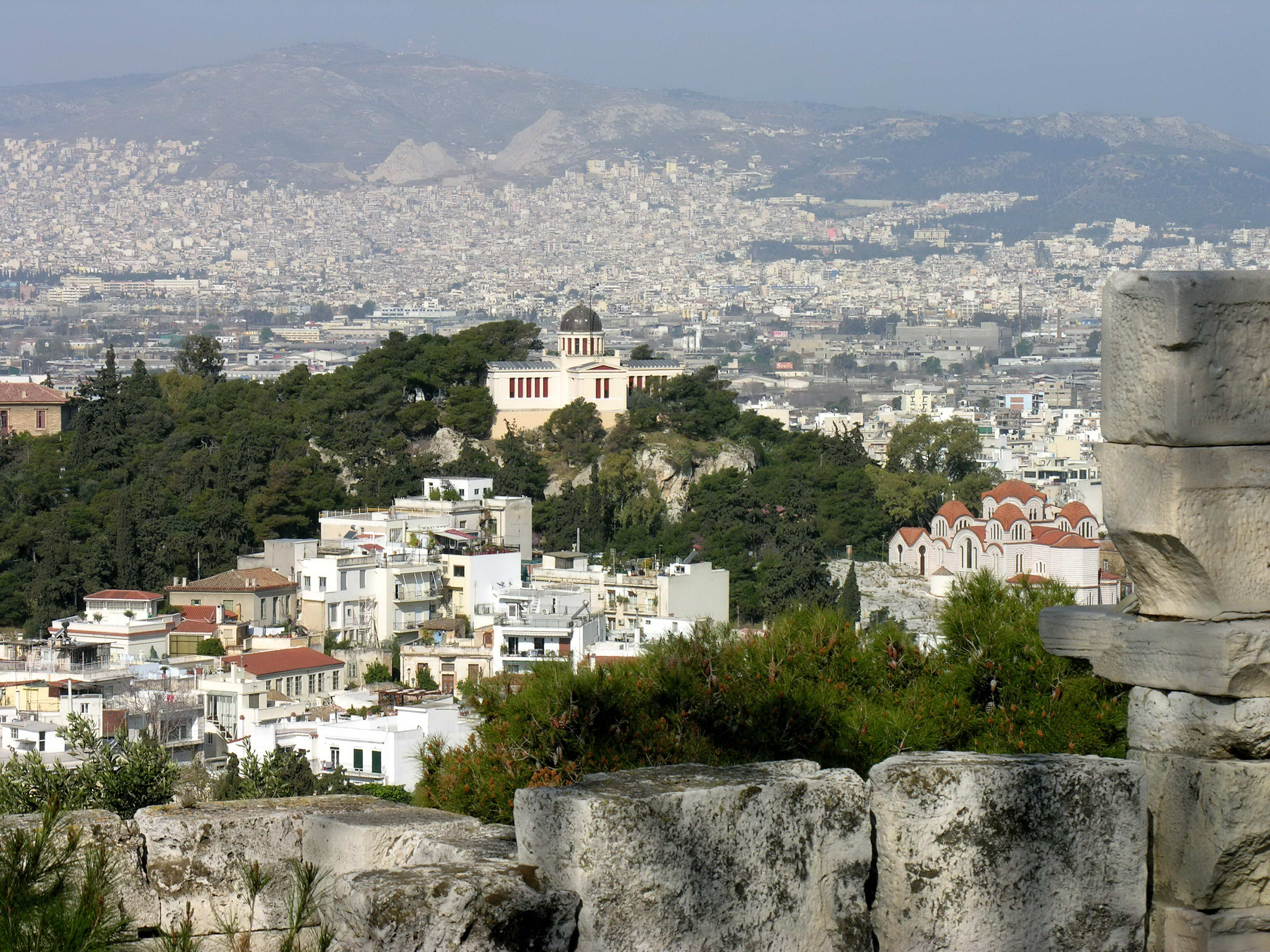
- The observatory and its neighbourhood

- Location within municipality of Athens
- Coordinates: 37°58′23″N 23°43′12″E
- Country: Greece
- Region: Attica
- City: Athens
- Postal code: 118 51
- Area code: 210
- Website: www.cityofathens.gr

Asteroskopeio (Greek: Αστεροσκοπείο, pronounced [a.ste.ɾo.skoˈpio]), meaning 'observatory', is a neighborhood of the center of Athens, Greece. It is located between Thiseio and Nymphon Hill. The neighbourhood named after the National Observatory of Athens that was built in Nymphon Hill in 1842, thanks to the donation of wealthy Greek Georgios Sinas. Near the hill is located Pnyx.

== See also ==
- National Observatory of Athens
