= Asyrmatos, Athens =

Asyrmatos Ασύρματος
- Neighborhood
- Location within Athens
- Coordinates: 37°58′10″N 23°42′55″E
- Country: Greece
- Region: Attica
- City: Athens
- Postal code: 118 51, 118 52
- Area code: 210
- Website: www.cityofathens.gr

Asyrmatos (Greek: Ασύρματος pronounced [aˈsiɾ.ma.tos]) or Attaliotika (Greek: Ατταλιώτικα pronounced [a.taˈʎo.ti.ka]) is a neighborhood of the center of Athens, Greece. It is located in the west slopes of Philopappos Hill, next to Ano Petralona district. It is technically part of Petralona.

Asyrmatos was named after a transmitting antenna of Greek Navy (asyrmatos being the Greek word for 'wireless'). This area was an old quarry where refugees from Asia Minor were settled, after the Asia Minor Disaster. Most of the refugees came from Attaleia, so the other name for this district is Attaliotika. The new settlement was built with rough and makeshift materials, giving it a characteristic slum-like appearance. During the Dekemvriana in 1944, the navy school and transmitting antenna were burnt down, leading the government to decide to accommodate the refugees in the old navy school facilities, with the building of stone houses and a block of flats.

Asyrmatos was used as natural scenery for the notable Greek neorealistic film Synoikia To Oneiro. The film was censored by the Greek authorities of the 1960s for depicting images of poverty and misery within Athens.
