= Aerides Bath =

Coordinates: 37°58′26.1″N 23°43′39.9″E

The Aerides Bath or Bath House of the Winds (Greek: Λουτρό των Αέρηδων) is the only surviving Ottoman-era public Hammam surviving in Athens, Greece.

Located at Kyrristou 8, near the Tower of the Winds (colloquially known as "Aerides", "the Winds"), it dates to the early period of Ottoman rule over the city (15th–17th centuries). It continued working as a bath until 1965. Following restoration, in 1998 it was handed over to the Museum of Modern Greek Culture, and is used for various exhibitions since.
