= Profitis Ilias, Athens =

Coordinates: 38.0287°N 23.7488°E

Profitis Ilias is a neighborhood of Athens, Greece.
