= List of members of the Hellenic Parliament, 2015 (September)–2019 =

17th (ΙZ΄)^{a} Plenary Session
←	16th (ΙΣΤ΄)	18th (ΙΗ΄)	→
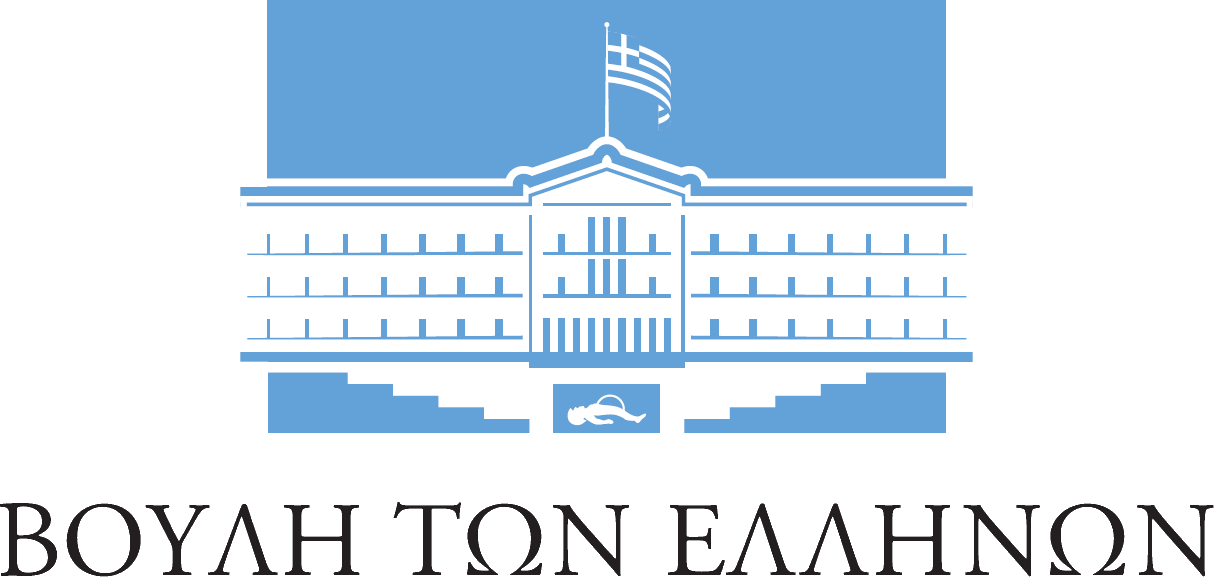

Overview
- Legislative body: Hellenic Parliament
- Jurisdiction: Greece
- Meeting place: Old Royal Palace, Athens
- Term: 20 September 2015 – 11 June 2019
- Election: September 2015 Greek legislative election
- Government: Second Cabinet of Alexis Tsipras
- Members: 300
- President: Nikos Voutsis (SYRIZA)
- First Vice President: Tasos Kourakis (SYRIZA)
- Second Vice President: Giorgos Varemenos (SYRIZA)
- Third Vice President: Tasia Christodoulopoulou (SYRIZA)
- Fourth Vice President: Nikitas Kaklamanis (ND)

This is a list of the 300 members who were elected to the Hellenic Parliament in the September 2015 Greek legislative election.

Initial composition: Syriza:145 New Democracy:75 Golden Dawn: 18 Democratic Alignment: 17 Communist Party of Greece 15 The River: 11 Independent Greeks :10 Union of Centrists:9

Final composition: Syriza:144 New Democracy:78 Golden Dawn: 16 Democratic Alignment: 19 Communist Party of Greece 15 The River: 5 Independents:23

== Legislative work ==
The parliament started its work by passing the bills that the SYRIZA government had negotiated with the country's lenders in the previous months in order to close the first evaluation of the Third Economic Adjustment Programme for Greece. In addition to the memorandum obligations, a very controversial law on television licenses was passed in 2015 (154 pro - 146 against), as well as the extension of the civil partnership to same-sex couples. (193 pro - 56 against)

== Members of Parliament ==
Note: The table of changes below records all changes in party affiliation.

Name	Constituency	Parliamentary Group	Comments
Ilchan Achmet	Rhodope	The River	
Ioannis Aivatidis	Corfu	Golden Dawn	
Georgios Akriotis	Euboea	SYRIZA	
Ioannis Amanatidis	Thessaloniki A	SYRIZA	
Georgios Amyras	Athens B	The River	
Athanasia Anagnostopoulou (Sia)	Achaea	SYRIZA	
Savvas Anastasiadis	Thessaloniki B	New Democracy	
Ioannis Andrianos	Argolis	New Democracy	
Ioannis Antoniadis	Florina	New Democracy	
Christos Antoniou	Imathia	SYRIZA	
Maria Antoniou	Kastoria	New Democracy	
Evangelos Apostolou	Euboea	SYRIZA	
Stavros Arachovitis	Laconia	SYRIZA	
Fotini Arambatzi	Serres	New Democracy	
Georgios Arvanitidis	Thessaloniki B	Democratic Alignment	
Anna-Michelle Assimakopoulou	Athens B	New Democracy	
Athanasios Athanasiou (Nassos)	Attica	SYRIZA	
Haralambos Athanasiou	Lesbos	New Democracy	
Eleni Avlonitou	Athens B	SYRIZA	
Dora Bakoyanni	Athens A	New Democracy	
Ioannis Balafas	Athens B	SYRIZA	
Gerasimos Balaouras	Elis	SYRIZA	
Symeon Ballis	Magnesia	SYRIZA	
Antonis Balomenakis	Chania	SYRIZA	
Aristidis Baltas	Attica	SYRIZA	
Konstantinos Barbaroussis	Aetolia-Acarnania	Golden Dawn	
Konstantinos Bargiotas	Larissa	The River	
Konstantinos Barkas	Preveza	SYRIZA	
Evangelos Bassiakos	Boeotia	New Democracy	
Dimitrios Baxevanakis	Elis	SYRIZA	
Christos Bialas	Grevena	SYRIZA	
Markos Bolaris	Thessaloniki A	SYRIZA	
Christos Boukoros	Magnesia	New Democracy	
Athanasios Bouras	Attica	New Democracy	
Tassia Christodoulopoulou	State list	SYRIZA	
Paraskevi Christofilopoulou (Evi)	Attica	Democratic Alignment	
Spyros Danellis	Heraklion	The River	
Athanasios Davakis	Laconia	New Democracy	
Ioannis Dedes	Attica	SYRIZA	
Yannis Delis	Thessaloniki A	Communist Party of Greece	
Nikolaos-Georgios Dendias	Athens B	New Democracy	
Georgios Dimaras	Athens B	SYRIZA	
Christos Dimas	Corinthia	New Democracy	
Dimitrios Dimitriadis	Kozani	SYRIZA	
Anastasios Dimoschakis (Tassos)	Evros	New Democracy	
Costas Douzinas	Piraeus A	SYRIZA	
Ioannis Dragassakis	State list	SYRIZA	
Theodoros Dritsas	Piraeus A	SYRIZA	
Panagiota Dritseli	Trikala	SYRIZA	
Giorgos Dzimanis	Kozani	SYRIZA	
Dimitrios Emmanouilidis	Kavala	SYRIZA	
Sokratis Famellos	Thessaloniki B	SYRIZA	
Nikos Filis	Athens A	SYRIZA	
Alexandros Flambouraris	Athens A	SYRIZA	
Aristidis Fokas	Thessaloniki B	Union of Centrists	
Theodoros Fortsakis	State list	New Democracy	
Iason Fotilas	Achaea	The River	
Theano Fotiou	State list	SYRIZA	
Dimitrios Gakis	Dodecanese	SYRIZA	
Anastasia Gara (Natacha)	Evros	SYRIZA	
Kostas Gavroglu	State list	SYRIZA	
Georgia Gennia	Piraeus A	SYRIZA	
Fotini Gennimata (Fofi)	Athens B	Democratic Alignment	
Theodoros Papatheodorou	Achaea	Democratic Alignment	
Georgios Georgandas	Kilkis	New Democracy	
Marios Georgiadis	Athens A	Union of Centrists	
Adonis Georgiadis	Athens B	New Democracy	
Efstathia Georgopoulou-Saltari (Efi)	Elis	SYRIZA	
Georgios Germenis	Athens B	Golden Dawn	
Olga Gerovasili	Arta	SYRIZA	
Gerasimos Giakoumatos	Athens B	New Democracy	
Efstathios Giannakidis	Xanthi	SYRIZA	
Stergios Giannakis	Preveza	New Democracy	
Vassilios Giogiakas	Thesprotia	New Democracy	
Antonios Gregos	Thessaloniki A	Golden Dawn	
Leonidas Grigorakos	Laconia	Democratic Alignment	
Ioannis Guiokas	Attica	Communist Party of Greece	
Ioannis Guiolas	Argolis	SYRIZA	
Konstantinos Guioulekas	Thessaloniki A	New Democracy	
Maximos Harakopoulos	Larissa	New Democracy	
Kostis Hatzidakis (Kostis)	Athens B	New Democracy	
Christos Hatzisavvas	Kilkis	Golden Dawn	
Vassilios Iconomou	State list	New Democracy	
Nikos Igoumenidis	Heraklion	SYRIZA	
Panagiotis Iliopoulos	Magnesia	Golden Dawn	
Ekaterini Inglezi	Chalkidiki	SYRIZA	
Haroula Kafandari (Hara)	Athens B	SYRIZA	
Georgios Kaissas	Evros	SYRIZA	
Nikitas Kaklamanis	Athens A	New Democracy	
Stavros Kalafatis	Thessaloniki A	New Democracy	
Ilias Kamateros	Dodecanese	SYRIZA	
Dimitris Kammenos	Piraeus B	Independent Greeks	
Panos Kammenos	Athens B	Independent Greeks	
Liana Kanelli	Athens A	Communist Party of Greece	
Christos Karagiannidis	Drama	SYRIZA	
Ioannis Karagiannis	Ioannina	SYRIZA	
Konstantinos Karagounis	Aetolia-Acarnania	New Democracy	
Evangelia Karakosta (Evi)	Piraeus B	SYRIZA	
Evangelos Karakostas	Boeotia	Golden Dawn	
Anna Karamanli	Athens B	New Democracy	
Kostas Karamanlis	Serres	New Democracy	
Kostas Karamanlis	Thessaloniki A	New Democracy	
Apostolos Karanastasis	Phthiotis	SYRIZA	
Theodoros Karaoglou	Thessaloniki B	New Democracy	
Georgios Karasmanis	Pella	New Democracy	
Euphrosyni Karassarlidou (Frosso)	Imathia	SYRIZA	
Nikolaos Karathanasopoulos	Achaea	Communist Party of Greece	
Aichan Kara Giousouf	Rhodope	SYRIZA	
Giorgos-Dimitris Karras	Athens B	Union of Centrists	
Georgios Kassapidis	Kozani	New Democracy	
Ilias Kassidiaris	Attica	Golden Dawn	
Irini Kassimati (Nina)	Piraeus B	SYRIZA	
Asterios Kastoris	Pieria	SYRIZA	
	Athens B	SYRIZA	
Vasiliki Katrivanou	Messenia	SYRIZA	
Konstantinos Katsafados	Piraeus A	New Democracy	
Andreas Katsaniotis	Achaea	New Democracy	
Chrysoula Katsavria-Sioropoulou	Karditsa	SYRIZA	
Giorgos Katsiantonis	Larissa	Union of Centrists	
Kostas Katsikis	Attica	Independent Greeks	
Marios Katsis	Thesprotia	SYRIZA	
Christos Katsotis	Athens B	Communist Party of Greece	
Dimitris Kavadellas	Attica	Union of Centrists	
Athnasios Kavvadas	Lefkada	New Democracy	
Ioanneta Kavvadia (Anneta)	Athens B	SYRIZA	
Symeon Kedikoglou (Simos)	Euboea	New Democracy	
Hara Kefalidou	Drama	Democratic Alignment	
Olga Kefalogianni	Athens A	New Democracy	
Ioannis A. Kefalogiannis	Rethymno	New Democracy	
Vassilis Kegeroglou	Heraklion	Democratic Alignment	
Christos Kellas	Larissa	New Democracy	
Niki Kerameus	State list	New Democracy	
Vassilios Kikilias	Athens A	New Democracy	
Vassilios Kokkalis	Larissa	Independent Greeks	
Maria Kollia-Tsaroucha	Serres	Independent Greeks	
Kostas Kondogeorgos	Evrytania	New Democracy	
Stavros Kontonis	Zante	SYRIZA	
Emmanouil Konsolas (Manos)	Dodecanese	New Democracy	
Petros Konstantineas	Messenia	SYRIZA	
Odysseas Konstantinopoulos	Arcadia	Democratic Alignment	
Dimitrios Konstantopoulos	Aetolia-Acarnania	Democratic Alignment	
Ilias Kostopanagiotou	Phocis	SYRIZA	
Nikos Kotzias	State list	SYRIZA	
Konstantinos Koukodimos	Pieria	New Democracy	
Dimitris Koukoutsis	Messenia	Golden Dawn	
Georgios Koumoutsakos	Athens B	New Democracy	
Elena Kountoura	Athens A	Independent Greeks	
Anastasios Kourakis (Tassos)	Thessaloniki A	SYRIZA	
Panagiotis Kouroumblis	Athens B	SYRIZA	
Giannis Koutsoukos	Elis	Democratic Alignment	
Dimitrios Koutsoumbas	Athens B	Communist Party of Greece	
Nikolaos Kouzilos	Piraeus A	Golden Dawn	
Panagiota Kozomboli-Amanatidi	Messenia	SYRIZA	
Dimitrios Kremastinos	Dodecanese	Democratic Alignment	
Dimitrios Kyriazidis	Drama	New Democracy	
Ioannis Lagos	Piraeus B	Golden Dawn	
Georgios Lambroulis	Larissa	Communist Party of Greece	
Spyridonas Lappas	Karditsa	SYRIZA	
Georgios Lazaridis	Thessaloniki B	Independent Greeks	
Vassilis Levendis	Athens B	Union of Centrists	
Saridis Ioannis	Thessaloniki A	Union of Centrists	
Zoe Livaniou	Euboea	SYRIZA	
Andreas Loverdos	Athens B	Democratic Alignment	
Spyros Lykoudis	Athens A	The River	
Christos Mandas	Ioannina	SYRIZA	
Giannis Maniatis	Argolis	Democratic Alignment	
Nikolaos Manios	Cyclades	SYRIZA	
Diamanto Manolakou	Piraeus B	Communist Party of Greece	
Dimitris Mardas	Thessaloniki B	SYRIZA	
Ekaterini Markou	Thessaloniki B	The River	
Georgia Martinou	Attica	New Democracy	
Georgios Mavrotas	Attica	The River	
Theodora Megaloikonomou	Piraeus B	Union of Centrists	
Anastasios Megalomystakas	Serres	Union of Centrists	
Alexandros Meikopoulos	Magnesia	SYRIZA	
Evangelos Meimarakis	Athens B	New Democracy	
Lefteris Avgenakis	Heraklion	New Democracy	
Andreas Michailidis	Chios	SYRIZA	
Eleni Zaroulia	Athens B	Golden Dawn	
Nikolaos Michaloliakos	Athens A	Golden Dawn	
Thanassis Michelis	Phthiotis	SYRIZA	
Ioannis Michelogiannakis	Heraklion	SYRIZA	
Nikos Michos	Euboea	Golden Dawn	Resigned from Golden Dawn in 2017; joined Popular Orthodox Rally in early 2018
Triandafyllos Mitafidis	Thessaloniki A	SYRIZA	
Notis Mitarakis	Chios	New Democracy	
Kyriakos Mitsotakis	Athens B	New Democracy	
Nikolaos Moraitis	Aetolia-Acarnania	Communist Party of Greece	
Kostas Morfidis	Kavala	SYRIZA	
Themistoklis Moumoulidis	Kozani	SYRIZA	
Moustafa Moustafa	Rhodope	SYRIZA	
Nikolaos Nikolopoulos	Achaea	Independent	
Georgios Oursouzidis	Imathia	SYRIZA	
Athanasios Pafilis	Athens B	Communist Party of Greece	
Giorgos Pallis	Lesbos	SYRIZA	
Ilias Panagiotaros	Athens B	Golden Dawn	
Nikolaos Panagiotopoulos	Kavala	New Democracy	
Efstathios Panagoulis (Stathis)	Athens B	SYRIZA	
Georgios Pandzas	Attica	SYRIZA	
Athanasios Papachristopoulos	Athens B	Independent Greeks	
Athanasios Papadopoulos (Sakis)	Trikala	SYRIZA	
Christophoros Papadopoulos	Athens B	SYRIZA	
Giorgos Papailiou	Arcadia	SYRIZA	
Katerina Papakosta-Sidiropoulou	Athens B	New Democracy	
Ekaterini Papanatsiou	Magnesia	SYRIZA	
Giorgos Papaphilippou	Kavala	SYRIZA	
Aleka Papariga	State list	Communist Party of Greece	
Christos Pappas	State list	Golden Dawn	
Nikos Pappas	Athens B	SYRIZA	
Nikos Paraskevopoulos	Thessaloniki A	SYRIZA	
Theodoros Parastatidis	Kilkis	SYRIZA	
Kostas Pavlidis	Corfu	SYRIZA	
Ioannis Plakiotakis	Lassithi	New Democracy	
Pavlos Polakis	Chania	SYRIZA	
Tassos Pratsolis	Euboea	SYRIZA	
Grigorios Psarianos	Athens B	The River	
Georgios Psychogios	Corinthia	SYRIZA	
Elena Rapti	Thessaloniki A	New Democracy	
Dimitrios Rizos	Evros	SYRIZA	
Andréas Rizoulis	Achaea	SYRIZA	
Ioannis Sachinidis	Pella	Golden Dawn	
Gabriel Sakellaridis	Athens A	SYRIZA	resigned on 19 November 2015
Marios Salmas	Aetolia-Acarnania	New Democracy	
Antonios Samaras	Messenia	New Democracy	
Nektarios Santorinios	Dodecanese	SYRIZA	
Yannis Sarakiotis	Phthiotis	SYRIZA	
Konstantinos Seltsas	Florina	SYRIZA	
Dimitrios Sevastakis	Samos	SYRIZA	
Ioannis Sifakis	Pella	SYRIZA	
Christos Simorelis	Trikala	SYRIZA	
Konstantinos Skandalidis	Athens A	Democratic Alignment	
Elissavet Skoufa (Betty)	Pieria	SYRIZA	
Panagiotis Skourletis (Panos)	Athens B	SYRIZA	
Panagiotis Skouroliakos (Panos)	Attica	SYRIZA	
Kostas Skrekas	Trikala	New Democracy	
Kostas Spartinos	Achaea	SYRIZA	
Christos Spirtzis	Athens B	SYRIZA	
Christos Staikouras	Phthiotis	New Democracy	
Eleni Stamataki	Piraeus A	SYRIZA	
Dimitrios I. Stamatis	State list	New Democracy	
Afroditi Stambouli	Serres	SYRIZA	
Georgios Stathakis	Chania	SYRIZA	
Ioannis Stefos	Ioannina	SYRIZA	
Konstantinos Stergiou	Magnesia	Communist Party of Greece	
Grigoris Stoyannidis	Xanthi	SYRIZA	
Georgios Stylios	Arta	New Democracy	
Emmanouil Syndychakis	Heraklion	Communist Party of Greece	
Antonios Syrigos	Cyclades	SYRIZA	
Nikolaos Syrmalenios	Cyclades	SYRIZA	
Stavros Tassos	Lesbos	Communist Party of Greece	
Konstantinos Tasoulas	Ioannina	New Democracy	
Olympia Teligioridou	Kastoria	SYRIZA	
Maria Theleriti	Corinthia	SYRIZA	
Stavros Theodorakis	Thessaloniki A	The River	
Harry Theoharis	Athens B	The River	
Thanasis Theocharopoulos	State list	Democratic Alignment	
Giannis Theonas	Athens B	SYRIZA	
Afroditi Theopeftatou	Cephalonia	SYRIZA	
Yannis Theophylaktos	Kozani	SYRIZA	
Nikos Thiveos	Boeotia	SYRIZA	
Mihalis Thrapsaniotis	Lassithi	SYRIZA	
Nikos Toskas	Athens B	SYRIZA	
Ioannis Tragakis	Piraeus B	New Democracy	
Alexandros Triandafyllidis (Alekos)	Thessaloniki A	SYRIZA	
Maria Triandafyllou	Aetolia-Acarnania	SYRIZA	
Euclid Tsakalotos	Athens B	SYRIZA	
Konstantinos Tsiaras	Karditsa	New Democracy	
Alexis Tsipras	Heraklion	SYRIZA	
Nikos Papadopoulos	Larissa	SYRIZA	
Vassilios Tsirkas	Arta	SYRIZA	
Yannis Tsironis	Athens B	SYRIZA	
Giorgos Tsogas	Corinthia	SYRIZA	
Theodora Tzakri	Pella	SYRIZA	
Harilaos Tzamaklis	Pieria	SYRIZA	
Konstantinos Tzavaras	Elis	New Democracy	
Mihalis Tzelepis	Serres	Democratic Alignment	
Meropi Tzoufi	Ioannina	SYRIZA	
Anna Vagena	Larissa	SYRIZA	
Evangelia Vagionaki (Valia)	Chania	SYRIZA	
Georgios Vagionas	Chalkidiki	New Democracy	
Fotini Vaki	Corfu	SYRIZA	
Sokratis Vardakis	Heraklion	SYRIZA	
Athanasios Vardalis	Thessaloniki B	Communist Party of Greece	
Georgios Varemenos	Aetolia-Acarnania	SYRIZA	
Miltiadis Varvitsiotis	Athens B	New Democracy	
Evangelos Venizelos	Thessaloniki A	Democratic Alignment	
Apostolos Vesyropoulos	Imathia	New Democracy	
Dimitrios Vettas	Phthiotis	SYRIZA	
Dimitris Vitsas	Piraeus B	SYRIZA	
Georgios Vlachos	Attica	New Democracy	
Sotiria Vlahou	Chalkidiki	Golden Dawn	
Konstantinos Vlassis	Arcadia	New Democracy	
Mavroudis Voridis (Makis)	Attica	New Democracy	
Sofia Voultepsi	Athens B	New Democracy	
Nikolaos Voutsis	Athens A	SYRIZA	
Panagiota Vrantza	Karditsa	SYRIZA	
Ioannis Vroutsis	Cyclades	New Democracy	
Andreas Xanthos	Rethymno	SYRIZA	
Nikolaos Xydakis	Athens B	SYRIZA	
Chousein Zeimpek	Xanthi	SYRIZA	
Konstantinos Zouraris	Thessaloniki A	Independent Greeks	

== Changes ==
- 19 November 2015: Gabriel Sakellaridis (Syriza, Athens A) resigned from parliament withdrawing from parliamentary politics.
- 19 November 2015: Nikolaos Nikolopoulos was expelled from the Parliamentary Group of Independent Greeks.

== See also ==
- September 2015 Greek legislative election
- Second Cabinet of Alexis Tsipras

== Notes ==
^a The parliamentary terms are numbered in consecutive order from 1975, with Greek numbering.
