= Same-sex marriage in Greece =

Same-sex marriage has been legal in Greece since 16 February 2024. In July 2023, Prime Minister Kyriakos Mitsotakis, head of the re-elected New Democracy party, announced his government's intention to legalise same-sex marriage. Its legalisation formed part of an LGBT equality action plan drafted in 2021 by a special committee appointed by Mitsotakis. Legislation was introduced to the Hellenic Parliament on 1 February 2024 and passed on 15 February by 176 votes to 76. The bill was signed into law by President Katerina Sakellaropoulou and took effect upon publication in the Government Gazette on 16 February. Polling suggests that a majority of Greeks support the legal recognition of same-sex marriage. Greece was the 16th member state of the European Union, the 21st country in Europe, and the 36th in the world to allow same-sex couples to marry.

Legislation recognizing cohabitation agreements, providing same-sex couples with some of the rights and benefits of marriage, was approved by the Hellenic Parliament on 23 December 2015 and published in the Government Gazette the following day.

== Cohabitation agreements ==
=== Introduction for opposite-sex couples ===
The Government of Greece under Prime Minister Kostas Karamanlis, which governed until October 2009, was opposed to same-sex marriage. The New Democracy-led government had proposed legislation that would offer several rights to unmarried couples, but only to opposite-sex couples. If introduced, the law was expected to be declared unconstitutional or against Council of Europe principles if brought to Greek or European courts. The Panhellenic Socialist Movement (PASOK) under George Papandreou, then in opposition, presented a legislative proposal in April 2006 for the recognition of unmarried couples, same-sex and opposite-sex, following the French example of the civil solidarity pact. However, according to some LGBT groups, the terminology of the proposal did little to advance LGBT rights, and it also banned same-sex couples from adopting. In November 2008, PASOK again submitted a draft law on cohabitation agreements, but it made no progress in Parliament. Responding to government proposals in 2008 to introduce legal rights for cohabiting couples, Archbishop Ieronymos II of Athens, Primate of the Church of Greece, suggested that "[t]here is a need to change with the time". It was unclear, however, whether this view applied to same-sex couples, particularly as the Church has previously opposed LGBT rights in general and civil union laws in particular.

Law 3719/2008 ("Reforms concerning the family, children and society"), which entered into force on 26 November 2008, established a form of partnership known as "cohabitation agreements" (Greek: σύμφωνο συμβίωσης, sýmfono symbíosis, pronounced [ˈsimfono simˈvi.osis]), but only available to opposite-sex couples.

=== Extension to same-sex couples ===
Laws regarding same-sex partnerships in Europe¹ Marriage Civil union Limited domestic recognition (cohabitation) Unrecognized Constitution limits marriage to opposite-sex couples ¹ May include recent laws or court decisions that have not yet entered into effect.

==== Discussions in 2009–2014 ====
Before the October 2009 legislative election, the Panhellenic Socialist Movement announced its support for same-sex registered partnerships in a reply to a questionnaire sent by the Lesbian & Gay Community of Greece (OLKE; Ομοφυλοφιλική Λεσβιακή Κοινότητα Ελλάδας, Omofylofilikí Lesviakí Koinótita Elládas), an LGBT rights organization. PASOK won a majority of seats in Parliament in that election. On 17 September 2010, Minister of Justice Haris Kastanidis announced that a special committee had been formed to prepare a registered partnership law that would include both same-sex and different-sex couples. The committee was constituted on 29 July 2010 and, according to its members, its work was to make proposals regarding the modernization of family law. It discussed matters regarding heterosexual couples until the end of 2010, and matters regarding same-sex couples from January 2011 onwards. On 19 August 2011, a government official announced that legislation recognizing same-sex relationships would be introduced "soon". In February 2013, Minister of Justice Antonis Roupakiotis said that the government was considering amending the cohabitation agreement law to include same-sex couples.

On 8 February 2011, the European Court of Human Rights (ECHR) decided to merge and accept two cases from four couples regarding a breach of Article 8 (respect of private and family life), Article 14 (freedom from discrimination) and Article 13 (effective remedy) of the European Convention on Human Rights. The cases were brought to the ECHR as a result of the government introducing cohabitation agreement legislation that specifically and expressly excluded same-sex couples. On 7 November 2013, the ECHR ruled in Vallianatos and Others v. Greece that excluding same-sex couples from cohabitation agreements was discriminatory. On 12 November, PASOK announced its intention to introduce a bill extending the cohabitation agreement law to same-sex couples. In November 2014, it was announced that many major changes to Greek family law would be considered, including the extension of cohabitation agreements to same-sex couples. It was also reported that the Ministry of Justice was not considering same-sex marriage. Parliament was dissolved in December 2014 following the government's failure to elect Stavros Dimas as president of Greece. Snap elections were called for January 2015, delaying the discussion to the following year.

==== Passage of legislation in 2015 ====
On 9 February 2015, following the January 2015 legislative election, the Syriza-led government, sworn in on 27 January 2015, promised to extend cohabitation agreements to same-sex couples. On 24 April 2015, the Secretary General of the Ministry of Justice announced the government's intention to introduce a bill to the Hellenic Parliament within two months. Shortly thereafter, a committee was formed to study the issue until 15 June 2015. The bill was published on 10 June 2015.

A new draft of the cohabitation agreement bill, which would grant same-sex couples some of the rights of marriage, was published on 9 November 2015. It was under public consultation until 20 November. Justice Minister Nikos Paraskevopoulos announced that the legislation would not grant adoption rights to same-sex couples, but that the issue "would be studied in the future". The bill was submitted to Parliament on 9 December, and approved on 22 December 2015 by a vote of 193–56 with 51 abstentions, following a contentious debate that lasted ten hours. The bill was supported by the governing center-left Syriza, the Democratic Alignment, The River and the Union of Centrists, but opposed by the far-right Golden Dawn, while the liberal-conservative New Democracy and the national-conservative Independent Greeks were divided. The Communist Party of Greece mostly abstained. The law was signed by President Prokopis Pavlopoulos, and published in the Government Gazette on 24 December. It took effect upon publication. The first same-sex cohabitation agreement was conducted in Athens on 25 January 2016 by Mayor Giorgos Kaminis.

22 December 2015 vote in the Parliament
Party	Voted for	Voted against	Abstained
G Syriza	140: Georgios Akriotis; Ioannis Amanatidis; Sia Anagnostopoulou; Christos Antoniou; Evangelos Apostolou; Stavros Arachovitis; Athanasios Athanasiou; Eleni Avlonitou; Ioannis Balafas; Gerasimos Balaouras; Symeon Ballis; Antonis Balomenakis; Aristides Baltas; Konstantinos Barkas; Dimitrios Baxevanakis; Christos Bialas; Tassia Christodoulopoulou; Ioannis Dedes; Giorgos Dimaras; Dimitrios Dimitriadis; Costas Douzinas; Thodoris Dritsas; Panagiota Dritseli; Giorgos Dzimanis; Dimitrios Emmanouilidis; Sokratis Famellos; Nikos Filis; Alexandros Flambouraris; Theano Fotiou; Dimitrios Gakis; Anastasia Gara; Kostas Gavroglu; Georgia Gennia; Efstathia Georgopoulou-Saltari; Olga Gerovasili; Efstathios Giannakidis; Ioannis Guiolas; Nikos Igoumenidis; Ekaterini Inglezi; Haroula Kafandari; Georgios Kaissas; Ilias Kamateros; Christos Karagiannidi; Ioannis Karagiannis; Evangelia Karakosta; Apostolos Karanastasi; Euphrosyni Karassarlidou; Aichan Kara Giousouf; Irini Kassimati; Asterios Kastoris; Vasiliki Katrivanou; Chrysoula Katsavria-Sioropoulou; Marios Katsis; Ioanneta Kavvadia; Stavros Kontonis; Petros Konstantineas; Ilias Kostopanagiotou; Nikos Kotzias; Tasos Kourakis; Panagiotis Kouroumblis; Panagiota Kozomboli-Amanatidi; Spyridonas Lappas; Zoe Livaniou; Christos Mandas; Nikolaos Manios; Dimitris Mardas; Alexandros Meikopoulos; Andreas Michailidis; Thanassis Michelis; Ioannis Michelogiannakis; Triandafyllos Mitafidis; Kostas Morfidis; Themistoklis Moumoulidis; Moustafá Moustafá; Georgios Oursouzidis; Giorgos Pallis; Georgios Pandzas; Athanasios Papadopoulos; Christophoros Papadopoulos; Nikos Papadopoulos; Giorgos Papailiou; Ekaterini Papanatsiou; Giorgos Papaphilippou; Nikos Pappas; Nikos Paraskevopoulos; Theodoros Parastatidis; Kostas Pavlidis; Pavlos Polakis; Tassos Pratsolis; Georgios Psychogios; Dimitrios Rizos; Andréas Rizoulis; Gabriel Sakellaridis; Nektarios Santorinios; Yannis Sarakiotis; Konstantinos Seltsas; Dimitrios Sevastakis; Ioannis Sifakis; Christos Simorelis; Elissavet Skoufa; Panos Skourletis; Panagiotis Skouroliakos; Kostas Spartinos; Christos Spirtzis; Eleni Stamataki; Afroditi Stambouli; Giorgos Stathakis; Ioannis Stefos; Grigoris Stoyannidis; Antonios Syrigos; Nikolaos Syrmalenios; Olympia Teligioridou; Maria Theleriti; Giannis Theonas; Afroditi Theopeftatou; Nikos Thiveos; Mihalis Thrapsaniotis; Nikos Toskas; Alexandros Triandafyllidis; Maria Triandafyllou; Euclid Tsakalotos; Alexis Tsipras; Vassilios Tsirkas; Yannis Tsironis; Giorgos Tsogas; Theodora Tzakri; Harilaos Tzamaklis; Meropi Tzoufi; Anna Vagena; Evangelia Vagionaki; Fotini Vaki; Sokratis Vardakis; Georgios Varemenos; Dimitrios Vettas; Dimitris Vitsas; Nikos Voutsis; Panagiota Vrantza; Andreas Xanthos; Nikos Xydakis; Chousein Zeimpek	–	4: Markos Bolaris; Yannis Dragasakis; Efstathios Panagoulis; Yannis Theophylaktos
New Democracy	19: Dora Bakoyannis; Nikos Dendias; Christos Dimas; Theodoros Fortsakis; Gerasimos Giakoumatos; Kostis Hatzidakis; Vassilios Iconomou; Nikitas Kaklamanis; Symeon Kedikoglou; Olga Kefalogianni; Niki Kerameus; Giorgos Koumoutsakos; Kyriakos Mitsotakis; Nikolaos Panagiotopoulos; Katerina Papakosta; Giannis Plakiotakis; Konstantinos Tasoulas; Miltiadis Varvitsiotis; Giannis Vroutsis	29: Savvas Anastasiadis; Maria Antoniou; Fotini Arambatzi; Anna-Misel Asimakopoulou; Haralambos Athanasiou; Christos Boukoros; Athanasios Bouras; Athanasios Davakis; Anastasios Dimoschakis; Georgios Georgandas; Stergios Giannakis; Vassilios Giogiakas; Maximos Harakopoulos; Anna Karamanli; Georgios Karasmanis; Georgios Kassapidis; Andreas Katsaniotis; Athnasios Kavvadas; Ioannis Kefalogiannis; Christos Kellas; Emmanouil Konsolas; Konstantinos Koukodimos; Dimitrios Kyriazidis; Notis Mitarakis; Georgios Vagionas; Apostolos Vesyropoulos; Georgios Vlachos; Konstantinos Vlassis; Makis Voridis	27: Ioannis Andrianos; Ioannis Antoniadis; Eleftherios Avgenakis; Evangelos Basiakos; Adonis Georgiadis; Konstantinos Guioulekas; Stavros Kalafatis; Konstantinos Karagounis; Kostas Karamanlis; Kostas Karamanlis; Theodoros Karaoglou; Konstantinos Katsafados; Vasilis Kikilias; Kostas Kondogeorgos; Georgia Martinou; Vangelis Meimarakis; Elena Rapti; Marios Salmas; Antonis Samaras; Kostas Skrekas; Christos Staikouras; Dimitrios Stamatis; Georgios Stylios; Ioannis Tragakis; Konstantinos Tsiaras; Konstantinos Tzavaras; Sofia Voultepsi
Golden Dawn	–	18: Ioannis Aivatidis; Konstantinos Barbarousis; Georgios Germenis; Antonios Gregos; Christos Hatzisavvas; Panagiotis Iliopoulos; Evangelos Karakostas; Ilias Kasidiaris; Dimitris Koukoutsis; Nikos Kouzilos; Ioannis Lagos; Nikolaos Michaloliakos; Nikos Michos; Ilias Panagiotaros; Christos Pappas; Ioannis Sachinidis; Sotiria Vlahou; Eleni Zaroulia	–
Democratic Alignment	16: Georgios Arvanitidis; Evi Christofilopoulou; Theodoros Papatheodorou; Leonidas Grigorakos; Hara Kefalidou; Vassilis Kegeroglou; Odysseas Konstantinopoulos; Dimitrios Konstantopoulos; Giannis Koutsoukos; Dimitrios Kremastinos; Andreas Loverdos; Giannis Maniatis; Kostas Skandalidis; Thanasis Theocharopoulos; Mihalis Tzelepis; Evangelos Venizelos	–	1: Fofi Gennimata
Communist Party of Greece	–	3: Ioannis Giokas; Georgios Lambroulis; Emmanouil Syndychakis	12: Yannis Delis; Liana Kanelli; Nikolaos Karathanasopoulos; Christos Katsotis; Dimitris Koutsoumpas; Diamanto Manolakou; Nikolaos Moraitis; Thanasis Pafilis; Aleka Papariga; Konstantinos Stergiou; Stavros Tassos; Athanasios Vardalis
The River	9: Georgios Amyras; Konstantinos Bargiotas; Spyros Danellis; Iason Fotilas; Spyros Lykoudis; George Mavrotas; Grigoris Psarianos; Stavros Theodorakis; Harry Theoharis	–	2: Ilchan Achmet; Ekaterini Markou
G Independent Greeks	3: Elena Kountoura; Athanasios Papachristopoulos; Kostas Zouraris	5: Dimitris Kammenos; Kostas Katsikis; Vassilios Kokkalis; Maria Kollia-Tsaroucha; Georgios Lazaridis	2: Panos Kammenos
Union of Centrists	6: Marios Georgiadis; Giorgos-Dimitris Karras; Dimitris Kavadellas; Vasilis Leventis; Theodora Megaloikonomou; Ioannis Saridis	–	3: Aristidis Fokas; Giorgos Katsiantonis; Anastasios Megalomystakas
Independent	–	1: Nikolaos Nikolopoulos	–
Total	193	56	51
Total	64.3%	18.7%	17.0%

On 9 November 2016, the government submitted a draft bill equalizing cohabitation agreements with marriages in several areas including employment benefits and workers' rights. The bill was approved by Parliament on 2 December in a 201–21 vote. It was signed into law by President Pavlopoulos on 8 December 2016 and took effect upon publication in the official journal the following day.

=== Statistics ===
According to the Hellenic Statistical Authority, 2,330 same-sex cohabitation agreements had been registered in Greece by the end of 2023, mostly between male couples. Cohabitation agreements have also become popular among opposite-sex couples. In 2023, 39% of all unions conducted in Greece were religious marriages, while 34% were civil marriages and 27% were cohabitation agreements.

Number of cohabitation agreements registered in Greece
Year	Same-sex unions			Opposite-sex unions	Total unions	% same-sex
Year	Female	Male	Total	Opposite-sex unions	Total unions	% same-sex
2016	50	167	217	3,579	3,796	5.72%
2017	40	94	134	4,787	4,921	2.72%
2018	55	231	286	6,083	6,369	4.49%
2019	54	199	253	7,671	7,924	3.19%
2020	64	172	236	8,750	8,986	2.63%
2021	89	225	314	11,236	11,550	2.72%
2022	113	394	507	12,650	13,157	3.85%
2023	121	262	383	14,686	15,069	2.54%

== Same-sex marriage ==
=== First marriages in Tilos ===
In 2008, the LGBT rights group OLKE announced its intention to sue municipalities that refused to marry same-sex couples, pointing out a loophole in the 1982 law that legalized civil marriage between "persons", without reference to gender. On 3 June 2008, Mayor Anastasios Aliferis of Tilos married two same-sex couples, two lesbians and two gay men, citing the legal loophole. He was heavily criticized by clergymen of the Church of Greece, which in the past had also opposed the introduction of heterosexual civil marriage, the original intent of the 1982 law. Justice Minister Sotirios Hatzigakis declared the Tilos marriages "invalid" and Supreme Court prosecutor Georgios Sanidas warned Aliferis of the legal repercussions of his "breach of duty", but he said he had "no intention of annulling the marriages". Government officials filed a court motion to annul the two same-sex marriages, triggering demonstrations and protests among the LGBT community.

On 5 May 2009, a court of first instance in Rhodes ruled that the marriages were invalid, but the couples appealed the ruling. A hearing in the case by a court of appeal was held on 14 January 2011. The court issued a decision invalidating both marriages on 14 April 2011. On 30 November 2017, this ruling was upheld by the Supreme Court. The couples subsequently announced their intention to sue Greece at the European Court of Human Rights (ECHR).

=== Tsipras governments ===
Syriza, the main party in Greece's coalition governments from 2015 to 2019 under Prime Minister Alexis Tsipras, had promised to legalize same-sex marriage as part of its September 2015 campaign platform, though no legislation was ever proposed. On 10 June 2019, a few weeks ahead of the parliamentary election held on 7 July 2019, Tsipras repeated the promise, stating that his party would push through same-sex marriage legislation if it won the election. However, his party was not re-elected.

=== Passage of legislation in 2024 ===
On 17 March 2021, Prime Minister Mitsotakis formed a committee mandated to prepare a national strategy for LGBT equality. The committee was chaired by Linos-Alexandre Sicilianos, a former president of the ECHR. Its members included experts in family and constitutional law, representatives of civil society including spokespeople from the Transgender Support Association, Thessaloniki Pride and the Rainbow Families of Greece, as well as several government officials. Among them were Panos Alexandris, Secretary General of Justice and Human Rights, and Alex Patelis, the Chief Economic Adviser to the Prime Minister, who had publicly come out as gay in June 2020, becoming the most senior openly LGBT government official in Greece. On 29 June 2021, the committee presented the national strategy to Mitsotakis, which included a section addressing same-sex marriage. A dedicated team within the Prime Minister's office was subsequently formed to develop an action plan based on the strategy's recommendations. Numerous meetings were held with relevant ministries, and the plan's proposals were integrated into their respective annual action plans. As a result of these policies, ILGA-Europe raised Greece's score on its "Rainbow Map" from 47% in 2021 to 57% in 2023, ranking the country 13th in Europe.

In June 2022, Syriza lawmakers introduced a same-sex marriage bill to the Hellenic Parliament, but it was not discussed before the end of the legislative session. On 1 April 2023, Tsipras again vowed to legalize same-sex marriage if his party were elected to government in the May 2023 elections; however, Syriza was not elected.

In July 2023, Prime Minister Kyriakos Mitsotakis, whose New Democracy party was re-elected in the June 2023 election, announced his government's intention to legalize same-sex marriage. In an interview with Bloomberg Television, Mitsotakis added that "Greek society is much more ready and mature." In September, Kathimerini reported that a draft bill legalizing same-sex marriage was expected to be introduced to Parliament "in the coming months". The bill would define marriage as the union of "two persons of the same or different sex", and guarantee all the rights and obligations of marriage to married spouses irrespective of sexual orientation. Mitsotakis also said New Democracy MPs would be granted a conscience vote. In November 2023, media reported that the government was "finalising" the bill. In December, the monastic community of Mount Athos expressed its opposition to the bill. The Church of Greece also released a statement opposing the proposed bill. It also expressed its opposition to adoption by same-sex couples and argued that children "are being treated as 'accessories' and 'companion pets' for gay couples". Government spokesman Pavlos Marinakis reacted to the statement, "We always listen to the opinions of the Church with respect. But at the same time, we are implementing our policy, and will listen to the views of society, civil society, the citizenry, institutions, and parties in total." An opinion poll conducted in December showed that 52% of Greek citizens supported same-sex marriage.

On 8 January 2024, Syriza introduced its own same-sex marriage bill to Parliament. Prime Minister Mitsotakis confirmed the government's intention to legalize same-sex marriage and adoption on 10 January, adding that he hoped to have the bill approved before Easter. On 11 January, Stefanos Kasselakis announced his support for the government bill despite its "imperfections" on parental rights, and said he would instruct all Syriza lawmakers to vote for the proposal, though some Syriza MPs eventually did not vote for the bill. The government ruled out holding a referendum on the issue on 19 January. A public consultation period lasted from 25 January until 31 January, with the bill being introduced to Parliament on 1 February by Minister of State Akis Skertsos. A committee debate on 5 February showed majority support for the bill. A final vote on the legislation took place on 15 February with the bill passing by 176 votes to 76. It was signed into law by President Katerina Sakellaropoulou and took effect upon publication in the Government Gazette on 16 February 2024 (Law 5089/2024). Following the vote, a celebratory dinner attended by Sakellaropoulou, Skertsos, and Patelis faced criticism from the conservative press. According to some analysts, the backlash from this event was a contributing factor in Sakellaropoulou not being nominated for a second term. The first same-sex marriage took place in Nea Smyrni, South Athens on 2 March 2024 between Stavros Gavriliadis and Dimitris Elefsiniotis.

15 February 2024 vote in the Parliament
Party	Voted for	Voted against	Abstained
G New Democracy	107: Ireni Agapidaki; Christina Alexopoulou; Maria Antoniou; Eleftherios Avgenakis; Dionysia Avgerinopoulou; Dimitris Avramopoulos; Dora Bakoyannis; Tasos Bartzokas; Thanasis Bouras; Nefeli Chatziioannidou; Michalis Chrisochoidis; Angeliki Delikari; Nikos Dendias; Christos Dermentzopoulos; Christos Dimas; Anna Efthymiou; Filippos Fortomas; Jason Fotilas; Adonis Georgiadis; Yiannis Giorgos; Diamantis Golidakis; Dionysis Hatzidakis; Kostis Hatzidakis; Tasos Hatzivasileiou; Mika Iatridi; Dimitris Kairidis; Nikitas Kaklamanis; Stavros Kalafatis; Christos Kapetanos; Panagis Kappatos; Konstantina Karabatsoli; Kostas Karamanlis; George Karasmanis; Kostas Katsafados; Simos Kedikoglou; Olga Kefalogianni; Ioannis Kefalogiannis; Konstantinos Kefalogiannis; Christos Kellas; Niki Kerameus; Vasilis Kikilias; Efstathios Konstantinidis; George Kotsiras; Giorgos Kotsos; Neoklis Kritikos; Eleftherios Ktistakis; Konstantinos Kyranakis; Spyros Kyriakis; Makarios Lazaridis; Evangelos Liakos; Thanasis Lioutas; Michalis Livanos; Yannis Loverdos; Ioanna Lytrivi; Zetta Makri; Anna Mani Papadimitriou; Alexandros Markogiannakis; Dimitris Markopoulos; Domna Michailidou; Kyriakos Mitsotakis; Andreas Nikolakopoulos; Giannis Oikonomou; Tzina Oikonomou; Nikolaos Panagiotopoulos; Michalis Papadopoulos; Katerina Papakosta; Fanis Papas; Nikos Papathanasis; Thanasis Papathanasis; Giannis Pappas; Kyriakos Pierrakakis; Giannis Plakiotakis; Elena Rapti; Zoe Rapti; Theodoros Roussopoulos; Maximos Senetakis; Stratos Simopoulos; Asimina Skondra; Kostas Skrekas; Theodoros Skylakakis; Vassilis Spanakis; Telis Spanias; Christos Staikouras; Giorgos Stamatis; Dionysis Stamenitis; Christos Stylianides; George Stylios; Maria Syregela; Nikos Tagaras; Konstantinos Tasoulas; Takis Theodorikakos; Harry Theoharis; Ioannis Tragakis; Christos Triandopoulos; Lazaros Tsavdaridis; Konstantinos Tsiaras; Spyros Tsilingiris; Dimitris Vartzopoulos; Apostolos Vesyropoulos; Marilena Vilialis-Soukoulis; Nikos Vlachakos; Sevi Voloudakis; Sofia Voultepsi; George Vrettakos; Giannis Vroutsis; Vasilis Ypsilantis; Sofia Zacharaki	20: Fotini Arabatzi; Charalambos Athanasiou; Fontas Baraliakos; Maximos Charakopoulos; Miltos Chrysomallis; Thanasis Davakis; Tasos Dimoschakis; Stefanos Gikas; Vasileios Giogiakas; Konstantinos Gioulekas; Kostas Karagounis; Anna Karamanli; Theodoros Karaoglou; Andreas Katsaniotis; Dimitris Kyriazidis; Theofilos Leontaridis; Yannis Paschalidis; Marios Salmas; Antonis Samaras; Euripides Stylianides	31: Dionysis Aktypis; John Andrianos; Yannis Bougas; Christos Boukoros; George Georgantas; Giannis Giatsios; Markos Kafouros; Yannis Kallianos; Dimitris Kalogeropoulos; Thanasis Kavvadas; Maria Kefala; Stavros Keletsis; Manos Konsolas; George Kotronias; Spyros Koulkoudinas; Dimitris Kouvelas; Yannis Lambropoulos; Pericles Mantas; Notis Mitarachi; Katerina Monogyou; Vassilis Oikonomou; Stavros Papasotiriou; Stelios Petsas; Thanos Plevris; Christodoulos Stefanadis; Evangelos Syrigos; Lakis Vasiliadis; George Vlachos; Kostas Vlasis; Makis Voridis; Andreas Zambilis
Syriza	33: Elena Akrita; Evangelos Apostolakis; Alexandros Avlonitis; Kostas Barkas; Rallia Christidou; Rena Dourou; Sokratis Famellos; George Gavrilos; Olga Gerovasili; Christos Giannoulis; Dionysis Kalamatianos; Georgios Karameros; Simos Kedikoglou; Vasilis Kokkalis; Marina Kontotoli; Athina Linou; Kyriaki Malama; Haris Mamoulakis; Alexandros Meikopoulos; Katerina Notopoulou; George Papailiou; Andreas Panagiotopoulos; Nikos Pappas; Petros Pappas; Iota Poulos; Georgios Psychogios; Yannis Sarakiotis; Rania Thraskia; Alexis Tsipras; Theodora Tzakri; Calliope Vetta; Theofilos Xanthopoulos; Miltos Zambaras	–	3: Othon Iliopoulos; Pavlos Polakis; Nina Kasimati
Panhellenic Socialist Movement	21: Ilchan Achmet; Nikos Androulakis; Milena Apostolaki; Dimitris Biagis; Pavlos Christidis; Manolis Christodoulakis; Panagiotis Doudonis; Pavlos Geroulanos; Nadia Giannakopoulou; Naya Grigoraku; Michalis Katrinis; Paris Koukoulopoulos; Dimitris Mantzos; George Mulkiotis; George Nikitiadis; George Papandreou; Francis Parasiris; Stefanos Parastatides; Katerina Spyridaki; Giannis Tsimaris; Eleni Vacina	–	11: Manolis Chnaris; Katerina Kazani; Odysseas Konstantinopoulos; Evangelia Liakoulis; Stavros Michaelidis; Mpourchan Mparan; Tasos Nikolaidis; Apostolos Panas; Panagiotis Paraskevaidis; Andreas Poulas; Christina Starakas
Communist Party of Greece	–	21: Nikos Ambatielos; Aphrodite Ctena; Vivi Daga; Giannis Delis; Semina Digeni; Pacos Exarchos; Giannis Giokas; Liana Kanelli; Nikolaos Karathanasopoulos; Christos Katsotis; Maria Komninaka; Dimitris Koutsoumpas; Giorgos Lamproulis; Diamanto Manolakou; George Marinos; Vassilis Metaxas; Thanasis Pafilis; Nikolaos Papanastasis; Leonidas Stoltidis; Manolis Syntyhakis; Christos Tsokanis	–
Greek Solution	–	12: Sophia Asimakopoulou; Maria Athanasiou; Vassilis Billiardos; Kostas Boubas; Kostas Chitas; Stelios Fotopoulos; Vasilis Grammenos; Vassilis Kotidis; Simos Koupeloglou; Paris Papadakis; Pavlos Sarakis; Kyriakos Velopoulos	–
New Left	9: Effie Achtsioglou; Sia Anagnostopoulou; Theano Fotiou; Alexis Haritsis; Nasos Iliopoulos; Peti Perka; Euclid Tsakalotos; Dimitris Tzanakopoulos; Meropi Tzoufi	–	2: Ozgur Ferhat; Chousein Zeimpek
Spartans	–	10: Georgios Aspiotis; Thanasis Chalkias; Petros Dimitriadis; Ioannis Dimitrokallis; Michalis Gavyiotakis; Ioannis Kontis; Georgios Manousos; Vasilis Stigkas; Dionysis Valtoyiannis; Alexandros Zerveas	–
Victory	–	10: George Apostolakis; Andreas Boryllas; Komnenos Delveroudis; Tasos Economopoulos; Aspasia Kouroupakis; Dimitris Natsios; George Rountas; Nikos Papadopoulos; Spyros Tsironis; Nikolaos Vrettos	–
Course of Freedom	6: Spyros Bibilas; Eleni Karageorgopoulou; Diamantis Karanastasis; Alexandros Kazamias; Georgia Kefala; Zoe Konstantopoulou	–	–
Independent	–	3: Charalambos Katsivardas; Areti Papaioannou; Konstandinos Floros	1: Michalis Khourdakis
Total	176	76	48
Total	58.7%	25.3%	16.0%

The law amended article 1350 of the Greek Civil Code to state: Marriage shall be contracted between two persons of different or the same sex. (Note: Greek: Ο γάμος συνάπτεται μεταξύ δύο προσώπων διαφορετικού ή ίδιου φύλου.) In addition to granting same-sex couples full adoption rights, the law also recognizes their parental rights over children born abroad. It also allows for the retroactive recognition of same-sex marriages performed abroad, and abolished the requirement that transgender people divorce their partners before being allowed to legally change gender. Following the vote, ILGA-Europe ranked Greece sixth in Europe for LGBT rights, with a score of 71%.

Three religious organisations subsequently challenged the new law at the Council of State, arguing that the legalisation of same-sex marriage "alter[ed] the traditional concept of family and disadvantage[d] adopted children". The Council ruled 21–6 on 30 May 2025 that the law was constitutional and dismissed the lawsuit. It found that the marriage law "complies with constitutional provisions regarding equality and the protection of marriage, family, motherhood, and childhood". The court decision was officially published on 20 March 2026.

=== Statistics ===
More than 400 same-sex marriages had taken place in Greece by February 2025, of which around 65% were between two men.

=== Religious performance ===
Although the majority of Greeks (who are mostly Christian) support same-sex marriage according to opinion polls, the Church of Greece and the Catholic Church continue to oppose it. In early February 2024, an encyclical read out at Orthodox churches at a Sunday morning liturgy opposed measures it said would "promote the abolition of fatherhood and motherhood… and put the sexual choices of homosexual adults above the interests of future children". The Church of Greece campaigned heavily against legalization in 2024, issuing a statement in January: "This legislation conflicts with both Christian anthropology and with society's duty to ensure children's well-being and proper upbringing, but also with the children's right to have a paternal and maternal presence and care. For all those reasons, and with a sense of pastoral responsibility and love, our Holy Church is strongly opposed to the proposed bill." Further, Archbishop Ieronymos II of Athens reiterated the Church's opposition to civil marriage regardless of gender and called for a referendum on the legalization of same-sex marriage. Representatives of the monastic community of Mount Athos also expressed opposition to the same-sex marriage law, which does not apply to the autonomous region as it has its own sovereignty within Greece and the European Union.

== Public opinion ==
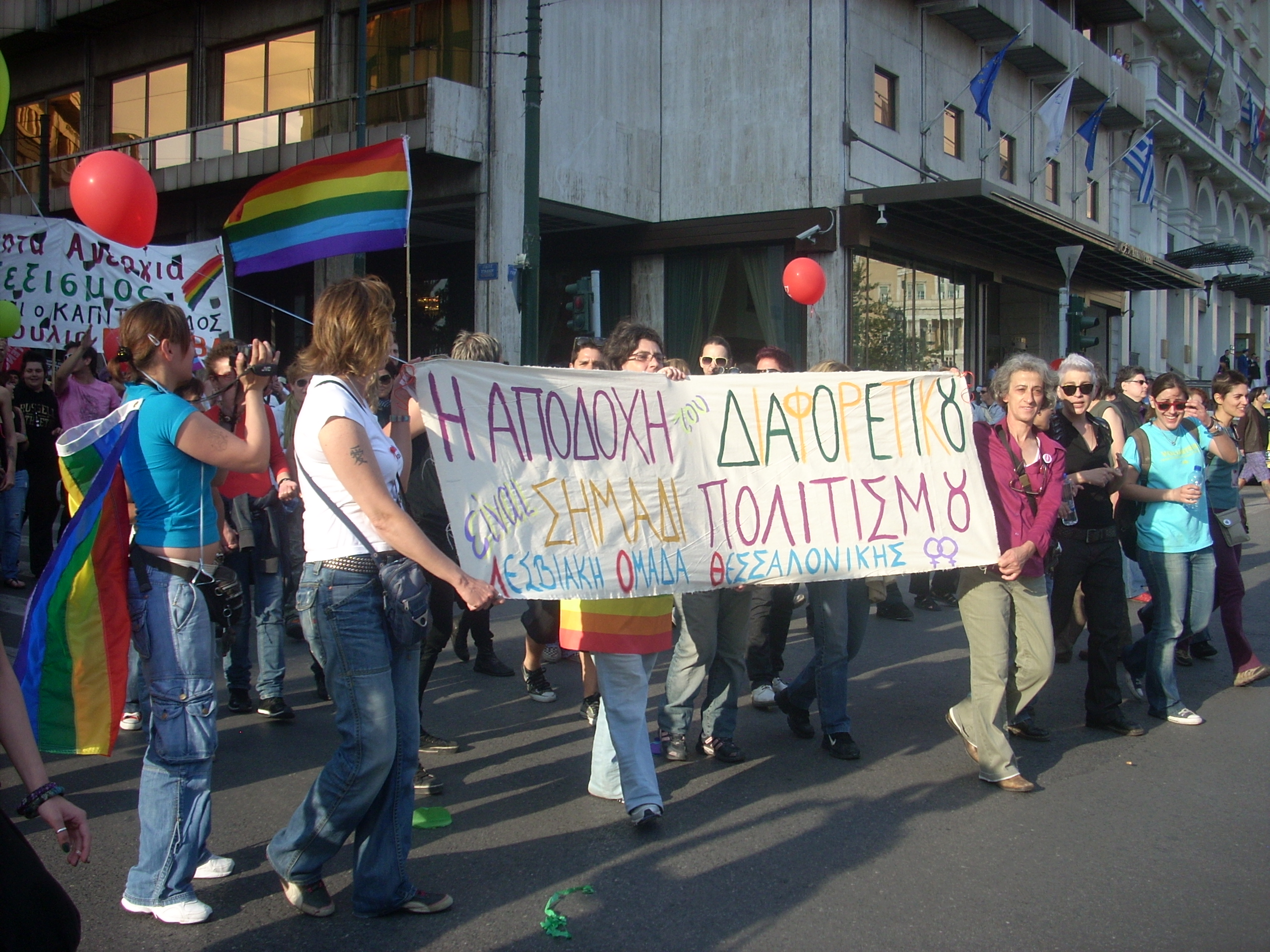
Participants at Athens Pride 2010, an event that prominently called for equal rights for same-sex couples, including the legal recognition of civil unions

A May 2015 Focus Bari poll found that 70% of Greeks agreed that civil partnerships should be extended to same-sex couples. The same poll also found majority support for same-sex marriage, with 56% in favor and 35% opposed. A poll conducted by DiaNEOsis in December 2016 showed that 50% of Greeks supported same-sex marriage and 26% were in favor of adoption by same-sex couples. The 2019 Eurobarometer found that 39% of Greeks thought same-sex marriage should be allowed throughout Europe, while 56% were opposed. The same poll found that 64% of respondents agreed with the statement: "Gay, lesbian and bisexual people should have the same rights as heterosexual people", whereas 32% disagreed. Those figures marked increases of 6% and 2%, respectively, compared to the 2015 Eurobarometer survey.

A 2020 poll conducted by the Friedrich Naumann Foundation in cooperation with KAPA Research found that same-sex marriage was supported by 56% of respondents, while adoption by same-sex couples was supported by 40%. A Pew Research Center poll conducted between February and May 2023 showed that 48% of Greeks supported same-sex marriage, 49% were opposed and 3% did not know or had refused to answer. When divided by age, support was highest among 18–34-year-olds at 67% and lowest among those aged 35 and above at 43%. Women (54%) were also more likely to support same-sex marriage than men (42%). When divided by political affiliation, support was highest among those on the left of the political spectrum at 74%, followed by those at the center at 50% and those on the right at 36%.

A December 2023 Pulse poll conducted for Skai between 18 and 20 December found that 52% of Greeks supported same-sex marriage and 33% were opposed, while 10% were undecided or indifferent to the issue and 5% did not answer. Specifically, 20% wanted same-sex marriage to be allowed, and 32% would not mind if same-sex marriage was allowed. Support for same-sex adoption was split however, as 42% of Greeks supported it and 47% were opposed, while 5% were undecided or indifferent to the issue and 6% did not answer. Specifically, 18% wanted same-sex adoption to be allowed, and 24% would not mind if same-sex adoption was allowed.

The 2023 Eurobarometer found that 57% of Greeks thought same-sex marriage should be allowed throughout Europe, while 40% were opposed. The survey also found that 57% of Greeks thought that "there is nothing wrong in a sexual relationship between two persons of the same sex", while 40% disagreed. In January 2024, an opinion poll conducted by the Proto Thema newspaper found that 55% of Greeks supported same-sex marriage and 53% supported adoption rights for same-sex couples. A poll conducted in late January 2024 by Metron Analysis showed that 62% of respondents supported same-sex marriage, with 36% opposed. However, regarding adoption rights for same-sex couples, only 30% expressed support, with 69% opposed. Support was highest among those on the left and center-left of the political spectrum, while lowest among those on the center and center-right.

== See also ==
- LGBT rights in Greece
- Recognition of same-sex unions in Europe
- Same-sex union court cases
