= List of members of the Hellenic Parliament, 2015 (February–August) =

This is a list of the 300 members who were elected to the Hellenic Parliament in the January 2015 Greek legislative election. A new legislative election took place on 20 September 2015.

== Composition ==
Initial composition after the 2015 elections: KKE: 15 SYRIZA: 149 PASOK : 13 Potami : 17 ND : 76 ANEL : 13 Golden Dawn : 17

Group	Start (January 2015)	End (August 2015)
Coalition of the Radical Left (SYRIZA)	149	124
New Democracy (ND)	76	76
Popular Unity (LAEN)	–	25
Golden Dawn (XA)	17	17
The River (Potami)	17	17
Communist Party of Greece (KKE)	15	15
Independent Greeks (ANEL)	13	13
Panhellenic Socialist Movement (PASOK)	13	13
Total	300	300

=== Changes from previous Parliament ===
The new parliament, sworn in on 5 February 2015, presented a radical departure from the past, with 134 out of 300 MPs elected for the first time. The new parliament also boasts the record number of 68 women MPs. For the first time, there was provision of a civil, instead of religious, oath, with the majority of MPs preferring to take the civil oath. Sixteen former ministers and other veteran political figures, chiefly from New Democracy and PASOK, failed to get elected. The most prominent "casualty" is former Prime Minister and former PASOK chairman George Papandreou, making this the first parliament since 1923 without a representative of the Papandreou political dynasty. The only MP remaining to have served in the first Parliament of the Third Hellenic Republic in 1974 is New Democracy member for Piraeus B, Ioannis Tragakis, while the only member elected in the 1977 parliament is New Democracy chairman and outgoing Prime Minister, Antonis Samaras.

	SYRIZA	ND	XA	Potami	KKE	ANEL	PASOK	Total
Reelected MPs	61	62	12	3	10	7	10	166
New MPs	88	14	5	14	5	6	3	134
Total	149	76	17	17	15	13	13	300

== Members of Parliament ==
Changes table below records all changes in party affiliation.

Name	Constituency	Parliamentary Group	Comments
Georgios Akriotis	Euboea	SYRIZA	
Ioannis Amanatidis	Thessaloniki A	SYRIZA	
Evangelia Ammanatidou-Paschalidou (Litsa)	Thessaloniki B	SYRIZA	from 21 August 2015: Popular Unity
Georgios Amyras	Athens B	The River	
Athanasia Anagnostopoulou (Sia)	Achaea	SYRIZA	
Savvas Anastasiadis	Thessaloniki B	New Democracy	
Ioannis Andrianos	Argolis	New Democracy	
Stavroula Antonakou	Piraeus A	The River	
Ioannis Antoniadis	Florina	New Democracy	
Maria Antoniou	Kastoria	New Democracy	
Rania Antonopoulou	State list	SYRIZA	
Evangelos Apostolou	Euboea	SYRIZA	
Stavros Arachovitis	Laconia	SYRIZA	
Fotini Arambatzi	Serres	New Democracy	
Georgios Arvanitidis	Thessaloniki B	PASOK-Democratic Alignment	
Michail Arvanitis-Avramis	Achaea	Golden Dawn	
Anna-Michelle Assimakopoulou	Athens B	New Democracy	
Athanasios Athanasiou (Nassos)	Attica	SYRIZA	
Haralambos Athanasiou	Lesbos	New Democracy	
Eleftherios Avgenakis	Heraklion	New Democracy	
Eleni Avlonitou	Athens B	SYRIZA	
Dora Bakoyanni	Athens A	New Democracy	
Ioannis Balafas	Athens B	SYRIZA	
Gerasimos Balaouras	Elis	SYRIZA	
Symeon Ballis	Magnesia	SYRIZA	
Konstantinos Barbaroussis	Aetolia-Acarnania	Golden Dawn	
Konstantinos Bargiotas	Larissa	The River	
Konstantinos Barkas	Preveza	SYRIZA	
Evangelos Bassiakos	Boeotia	New Democracy	
Dimitrios Baxevanakis	Elis	SYRIZA	
Christos Boukoros	Magnesia	New Democracy	
Athanasios Bouras	Attica	New Democracy	
Nikolaos Chountis	Athens B	SYRIZA	replaced by Giorgos Kyritsis on 13 July 2015
Paraskevi Christofilopoulou (Evi)	Attica	PASOK-Democratic Alignment	
Constantinos Damavolitis	Heraklion	Independent Greeks	replaced by Grigoris Makaronas on 3 July 2015
Spyros Danellis	Heraklion	The River	
Athanasios Davakis	Laconia	New Democracy	
Ioannis Dedes	Attica	SYRIZA	
Konstantinos Delimitros	Magnesia	SYRIZA	from 21 August 2015: Popular Unity
Nikolaos-Georgios Dendias	Athens B	New Democracy	
Konstantinos Dermitzakis	Lassithi	SYRIZA	
Evangelos Diamantopoulos	Kastoria	SYRIZA	from 21 August 2015: Popular Unity
Georgios Dimaras	Athens B	SYRIZA	
Christos Dimas	Corinthia	New Democracy	
Dimitrios Dimitriadis	Kozani	SYRIZA	
Anastasios Dimoschakis (Tassos)	Evros	New Democracy	
Iro Dioti	Larissa	SYRIZA	
Ioannis Dragassakis	Athens B	SYRIZA	
Theodoros Dritsas	Piraeus A	SYRIZA	
Panagiota Dritseli	Trikala	SYRIZA	
Ioannis Drivelegas	Chalkidiki	PASOK-Democratic Alignment	
Dimitrios Emmanouilidis	Kavala	SYRIZA	
Sokratis Famellos	Thessaloniki B	SYRIZA	
Nikos Filis	Athens A	SYRIZA	
Theodoros Fortsakis	State list	New Democracy	
Iason Fotilas	Achaea	The River	
Theano Fotiou	Athens B	SYRIZA	
Ioanna Gaitani	Thessaloniki A	SYRIZA	from 21 August 2015: Popular Unity
Dimitrios Gakis	Dodecanese	SYRIZA	
Georgios Galeos	Argolis	Golden Dawn	
Anastasia Gara (Natacha)	Evros	SYRIZA	
Fotini Gennimata (Fofi)	Athens B	PASOK-Democratic Alignment	
Georgios Georgandas	Kilkis	New Democracy	
Spyridon-Adonis Georgiadis	Athens B	New Democracy	
Efstathia Georgopoulou-Saltari (Efi)	Elis	SYRIZA	
Eleni Gerasimidou	Thessaloniki B	Communist Party of Greece	
Georgios Germenis	Athens B	Golden Dawn	
Olga Gerovassili	Arta	SYRIZA	
Gerasimos Giakoumatos	Athens B	New Democracy	
Efstathios Giannakidis	Xanthi	SYRIZA	
Stergios Giannakis	Preveza	New Democracy	
Vassilios Giogiakas	Thesprotia	New Democracy	
Antonios Gregos	Thessaloniki A	Golden Dawn	
Fotios Grekos	Thessaloniki B	Golden Dawn	
Leonidas Grigorakos	Laconia	PASOK-Democratic Alignment	
Stavros Grigoris	Lefkada	SYRIZA	
Stefanos Guikas	Corfu	New Democracy	
Ioannis Guiokas	Attica	Communist Party of Greece	
Konstantinos Guioulekas	Thessaloniki A	New Democracy	
Pavlos Haikalis	Attica	Independent Greeks	
Kyriakos Harakidis	Drama	The River	
Maximos Harakopoulos	Larissa	New Democracy	
Despina Haralambidou	Thessaloniki A	SYRIZA	from 21 August 2015: Popular Unity
Konstantinos Hatzidakis (Kostis)	Athens B	New Democracy	
Alexandros Hatzidimitriou	Serres	The River	
Vassilios Hatzilambrou	Achaea	SYRIZA	
Christos Hatzisavvas	Kilkis	Golden Dawn	
Vassilios Iconomou	State list	New Democracy	
Ekaterini Inglezi	Chalkidiki	SYRIZA	
Ilias Ioannidis	Kavala	SYRIZA	from 21 August 2015: Popular Unity
Konstantinos-Iraklis Isychos	Athens B	SYRIZA	from 21 August 2015: Popular Unity
Haroula Kafandari (Hara)	Athens B	SYRIZA	
Georgios Kaissas	Evros	SYRIZA	
Nikitas Kaklamanis	Athens A	New Democracy	
Stavros Kalafatis	Thessaloniki A	New Democracy	
Ilias Kamateros	Dodecanese	SYRIZA	
Dimitris Kammenos	Piraeus B	Independent Greeks	
Panagiotis Kammenos (Panos)	Athens B	Independent Greeks	
Garyfallia Kanelli (Liana)	Athens A	Communist Party of Greece	
Maria Kanellopoulou	Achaea	SYRIZA	
Christos Karagiannidis	Drama	SYRIZA	
Ioannis Karagiannis	Ioannina	SYRIZA	
Konstantinos Karagounis	Aetolia-Acarnania	New Democracy	
Evangelia Karakosta (Evi)	Piraeus B	SYRIZA	
Anna Karamanli	Athens B	New Democracy	
Kostas Karamanlis	Serres	New Democracy	
Kostas Karamanlis	Thessaloniki A	New Democracy	
Apostolos Karanastasis	Phthiotis	SYRIZA	
Theodoros Karaoglou	Thessaloniki B	New Democracy	
Georgios Karasmanis	Pella	New Democracy	
Euphrosyni Karassarlidou (Frosso)	Imathia	SYRIZA	
Nikolaos Karathanasopoulos	Achaea	Communist Party of Greece	
Aichan Kara Giousouf	Rhodope	SYRIZA	
Panagiotis Karkatsoulis	State list	The River	
Georgios Kassapidis	Kozani	New Democracy	
Ilias Kassidiaris	Attica	Golden Dawn	
Irini Kassimati (Nina)	Piraeus B	SYRIZA	
Harissios Katanas	Kozani	Independent Greeks	
Vasiliki Katrivanou	Athens B	SYRIZA	
Konstantinos Katsafados	Piraeus A	New Democracy	
Andreas Katsaniotis	Achaea	New Democracy	
Chrysoula Katsavria-Sioropoulou	Karditsa	SYRIZA	
Marios Katsis	Thesprotia	SYRIZA	
Christos Katsotis	Athens B	Communist Party of Greece	
Ioanneta Kavvadia (Anneta)	Athens B	SYRIZA	
Symeon Kedikoglou (Simos)	Euboea	New Democracy	
Olga Kefalogianni	Athens A	New Democracy	
Ioannis A. Kefalogiannis	Rethymno	New Democracy	
Vassilis Kegeroglou	Heraklion	PASOK-Democratic Alignment	
Christos Kellas	Larissa	New Democracy	
Niki Kerameus	State list	New Democracy	
Vassilios Kikilias	Athens A	New Democracy	
Dimitrios Kodelas	Argolis	SYRIZA	
Vassilios Kokkalis	Larissa	Independent Greeks	
Maria Kollia-Tsaroucha	Serres	Independent Greeks	
Stavros Kontonis	Zante	SYRIZA	
Alexandros Kondos	Xanthi	New Democracy	
Emmanouil Konsolas (Manos)	Dodecanese	New Democracy	
Petros Konstantineas	Messenia	SYRIZA	
Odysseas Konstantinopoulos	Arcadia	PASOK-Democratic Alignment	
Dimitrios Konstantopoulos	Aetolia-Acarnania	PASOK-Democratic Alignment	
Zoi Konstantopoulou	Athens A	SYRIZA	
Timoleon Kopsachilis	Grevena	New Democracy	
Ilias Kostopanagiotou	Phocis	SYRIZA	
Thomas Kotsias	Evrytania	SYRIZA	from 21 August 2015: Popular Unity
Konstantinos Koukodimos	Pieria	New Democracy	
Georgios Koumoutsakos	Athens B	New Democracy	
Elena Kountoura	Athens A	Independent Greeks	
Anastasios Kourakis (Tassos)	Thessaloniki A	SYRIZA	
Theofanis Kourembes (Fanis)	Corinthia	SYRIZA	
Panagiotis Kouroumblis	Athens B	SYRIZA	
Giannis Koutsoukos	Elis	PASOK-Democratic Alignment	
Dimitrios Koutsoumbas	Athens B	Communist Party of Greece	
Nikolaos Kouzilos	Piraeus A	Golden Dawn	
Panagiota Kozomboli-Amanatidi	Messenia	SYRIZA	
Dimitrios Kremastinos	Dodecanese	PASOK-Democratic Alignment	
Michail Kritsotakis	Heraklion	SYRIZA	from 21 August 2015: Popular Unity
Vassilios Kyriakakis	Phthiotis	SYRIZA	from 21 August 2015: Popular Unity
Dimitrios Kyriazidis	Drama	New Democracy	
Aglaia Kyritsi	State list	SYRIZA	from 21 August 2015: Popular Unity
Panagiotis Lafazanis	Piraeus B	SYRIZA	from 21 August 2015: Popular Unity
Ioannis Lagos	Piraeus B	Golden Dawn	
Georgios Lambroulis	Larissa	Communist Party of Greece	
Konstantinos Lapavitsas	Imathia	SYRIZA	from 21 August 2015: Popular Unity
Spyridonas Lappas	Karditsa	SYRIZA	
Efstathios Leoutsakos (Stathis)	Piraeus A	SYRIZA	from 21 August 2015: Popular Unity
Vassiliki Leva	Phthiotis	SYRIZA	
Andreas Loverdos	Athens B	PASOK-Democratic Alignment	
Spyros Lykoudis	Athens A	The River	
Antigoni Lymberaki	Athens B	The River	
Rachil Makri	Kozani	SYRIZA	from 21 August 2015: Popular Unity
Christos Mandas	Ioannina	SYRIZA	
Nikolaos Manios	Cyclades	SYRIZA	
Diamanto Manolakou	Piraeus B	Communist Party of Greece	
Georgios Marinos	Euboea	Communist Party of Greece	
Ekaterini Markou	Thessaloniki B	The River	
Georgia Martinou	Attica	New Democracy	
Artemios Matthaiopoulos	Serres	Golden Dawn	
Nikolaos Mavraganis	Euboea	Independent Greeks	
Georgios Mavrotas	Attica	The River	
Alexandros Meikopoulos	Magnesia	SYRIZA	
Evangelos-Vassilios Meimarakis	Athens B	New Democracy	
Andreas Michailidis	Chios	SYRIZA	
Nikolaos Michalakis	Karditsa	SYRIZA	
Nikolaos Michaloliakos	Athens A	Golden Dawn	
Ioannis Michelogiannakis	Heraklion	SYRIZA	
Nikolaos Michos	Euboea	Golden Dawn	
Triandafyllos Mitafidis	Thessaloniki A	SYRIZA	
Panagiotis Mitarachi (Notis)	Chios	New Democracy	
Alexios Mitropoulos	Attica	SYRIZA	
Kyriakos Mitsotakis	Athens B	New Democracy	
Nikolaos Moraitis	Aetolia-Acarnania	Communist Party of Greece	
Moustafa Moustafa	Rhodope	SYRIZA	
Nikolaos Nikolopoulos	Achaea	Independent Greeks	
Nikolaos Orfanos	Piraeus B	The River	
Georgios Oursouzidis	Imathia	SYRIZA	
Evgenia Ouzounidou	Kozani	SYRIZA	from 21 August 2015: Popular Unity
Athanasios Pafilis	Athens B	Communist Party of Greece	
Ilias Panagiotaros	Athens B	Golden Dawn	
Nikolaos Panagiotopoulos	Kavala	New Democracy	
Efstathios Panagoulis (Stathis)	Athens B	SYRIZA	
Georgios Pandzas	Attica	SYRIZA	
Athanasios Papachristopoulos	Athens B	Independent Greeks	
Athanasios Papadopoulos (Sakis)	Trikala	SYRIZA	
Ekaterini Papanatsiou	Magnesia	SYRIZA	
Alexandra Papariga	State list	Communist Party of Greece	
Christos Pappas	State list	Golden Dawn	
Nikolaos Pappas	Athens B	SYRIZA	
Theodoros Parastatidis	Kilkis	SYRIZA	
Athanasios Petrakos	Messenia	SYRIZA	from 21 August 2015: Popular Unity
Ioannis Plakiotakis	Lassithi	New Democracy	
Pavlos Polakis	Chania	SYRIZA	
Grigorios Psarianos	Athens B	The River	
Eleni Psarrea	Messenia	SYRIZA	from 21 August 2015: Popular Unity
Georgios Psychogios	Corinthia	SYRIZA	
Elena Rapti	Thessaloniki A	New Democracy	
Dimitrios Rizos	Evros	SYRIZA	
Gabriel Sakellaridis	Athens A	SYRIZA	
Marios Salmas	Aetolia-Acarnania	New Democracy	
Antonios Samaras	Messenia	New Democracy	
Stefanos Samoilis	Corfu	SYRIZA	from 21 August 2015: Popular Unity
Nektarios Santorinios	Dodecanese	SYRIZA	
Konstantinos Seltsas	Florina	SYRIZA	
Dimitrios Sevastakis	Samos	SYRIZA	
Ioannis Sifakis	Pella	SYRIZA	
Christos Simorelis	Trikala	SYRIZA	
Konstantinos Skandalidis	Athens A	PASOK-Democratic Alignment	
Elissavet Skoufa (Betty)	Pieria	SYRIZA	
Athanasios Skoumas	Boeotia	SYRIZA	from 21 August 2015: Popular Unity
Panagiotis Skourletis (Panos)	State list	SYRIZA	
Panagiotis Skouroliakos (Panos)	Attica	SYRIZA	
Kostas Skrekas	Trikala	New Democracy	
Christos Smias	Pella	SYRIZA	
Eleni Sotiriou	Attica	SYRIZA	
Christos Staikouras	Phthiotis	New Democracy	
Eleni Stamataki	Piraeus A	SYRIZA	
Dimitrios I. Stamatis	State list	New Democracy	
Afroditi Stambouli	Serres	SYRIZA	
Georgios Stathakis	Chania	SYRIZA	
Ioannis Stathas	Boeotia	SYRIZA	from 21 August 2015: Popular Unity
Ioannis Stefos	Ioannina	SYRIZA	
Dimitrios Stratoulis	Athens B	SYRIZA	from 21 August 2015: Popular Unity
Evripidis Stylianidis	Rhodope	New Democracy	
Georgios Stylios	Arta	New Democracy	
Despina Sveroni-Chondronassiou	Larissa	Golden Dawn	
Emmanouil Syndychakis	Heraklion	Communist Party of Greece	
Antonios Syrigos	Cyclades	SYRIZA	
Nikolaos Syrmalenios	Cyclades	SYRIZA	
Christina Tachiaou	Thessaloniki A	The River	
Konstantinos Tasoulas	Ioannina	New Democracy	
Stavros Tassos	Lesbos	Communist Party of Greece	
Kyriaki Tektonidou (Voula)	Thessaloniki A	SYRIZA	
Maria Theleriti	Corinthia	SYRIZA	
Stavros Theodorakis	Chania	The River	
Haris Theoharis	Athens B	The River	
Afroditi Theopeftatou	Cephalonia	SYRIZA	
Nikos Toskas	State list	SYRIZA	
Ioannis Tragakis	Piraeus B	New Democracy	
Alexandros Triandafyllidis (Alekos)	Thessaloniki A	SYRIZA	
Maria Triandafyllou	Aetolia-Acarnania	SYRIZA	
Euclid Tsakalotos	Athens B	SYRIZA	
Alexandra Tsanaka	Kavala	SYRIZA	from 21 August 2015: Popular Unity
Konstantinos Tsiaras	Karditsa	New Democracy	
Alexis Tsipras	Athens A	SYRIZA	
Vassilios Tsirkas	Arta	SYRIZA	
Constantine Tsoucalas	State list	SYRIZA	
Theodora Tzakri	Pella	SYRIZA	
Harilaos Tzamaklis	Pieria	SYRIZA	
Konstantinos Tzavaras	Elis	New Democracy	
Danae Tzika-Kostopoulou	Magnesia	SYRIZA	
Meropi Tzoufi	Ioannina	SYRIZA	
Anna Vagena	Larissa	SYRIZA	
Evangelia Vagionaki (Valia)	Chania	SYRIZA	
Georgios Vagionas	Chalkidiki	New Democracy	
Fotini Vaki	Corfu	SYRIZA	
Nadia Valavani	Athens B	SYRIZA	
Sokratis Vardakis	Heraklion	SYRIZA	
Athanasios Vardalis	Thessaloniki A	Communist Party of Greece	
Georgios Varemenos	Aetolia-Acarnania	SYRIZA	
Yanis Varoufakis	Athens B	SYRIZA	
Miltiadis Varvitsiotis	Athens B	New Democracy	
Evangelos Venizelos	Thessaloniki A	PASOK-Democratic Alignment	
Apostolos Vesyropoulos	Imathia	New Democracy	
Dimitrios Vettas	Phthiotis	SYRIZA	
Dimitris Vitsas	Athens B	SYRIZA	
Georgios Vlachos	Attica	New Democracy	
Konstantinos Vlassis	Arcadia	New Democracy	
Mavroudis Voridis (Makis)	Attica	New Democracy	
Sofia Voultepsi	Athens B	New Democracy	
Nikolaos Voutsis	Athens A	SYRIZA	
Ioannis Vroutsis	Cyclades	New Democracy	
Andreas Xanthos	Rethymno	SYRIZA	
Stavroula Xoulidou	Thessaloniki B	Independent Greeks	
Nikolaos Xydakis	Athens B	SYRIZA	
Konstantinos Zacharias	Arcadia	SYRIZA	
Zissis Zannas	Pieria	SYRIZA	from 21 August 2015: Popular Unity
Eleni Zaroulia	Athens B	Golden Dawn	
Ioannis Zerdelis	Lesbos	SYRIZA	from 21 August 2015: Popular Unity
Chousein Zeimpek	Xanthi	SYRIZA	
Konstantinos Zouraris	Thessaloniki A	Independent Greeks	

== Changes ==
- 2 July 2015: Constantinos Damavolitis (Heraklion) leaves ANEL, then resigns from Parliament. His seat is taken by Grigoris Makaronas.
- 13 July 2015: Nikos Chountis (Syriza, Athens B) resigns from Parliament in order to succeed Manolis Glezos in the European Parliament. His seat is taken by Giorgos Kyritsis.
- 21 August 2015: Panagiotis Lafazanis, Evangelia Ammanatidou-Paschalidou, Ioanna Gaitani, Konstantinos Delimitros, Evangelos Diamantopoulos, Zissis Zannas, Ioannis Zerdelis, Konstantinos-Iraklis Isychos, Ilias Ioannidis, Michail Kritsotakis, Aglaia Kyritsi, Thomas Kotsias, Konstantinos Lapavitsas, Efstathios Leoutsakos, Rachil Makri, Evgenia Ouzounidou, Athanasios Petrakos, Stefanos Samoilis, Athanasios Skoumas, Ioannis Stathas, Dimitrios Stratoulis, Alexandra Tsanaka, Despina Haralambidou, Eleni Psarrea and Vassilios Kyriakakis leave Syriza and form Popular Unity.

== See also ==
- January 2015 Greek legislative election
- First Cabinet of Alexis Tsipras and Cabinet of Vassiliki Thanou
- September 2015 Greek legislative election

== Sources ==
- Ministry of Interior
