= Yannis Charalambous =

Greek politician and lawyer

Yiannis Charalambous (born 1940) is a Greek lawyer and politician who has served as a Member of Hellenic Parliament and Minister with the PASOK party, as well as Mayor of Nea Ionia.

== Biographical information ==
He was born in 1940 in Athens. He studied at the Athens Law School and practiced law.

He was involved in politics as a member of the Greek Democratic Youth (predictatorship) and of PASOK since 1974. From 1975 to 1981, he was a municipal councilor and president of the Nea Ionia Municipal Council. He served as the Secretary of Local Government for PASOK and a member of the Central Committee.

He served as a Member of Parliament for Athens B with PASOK from 1981 until 2000. He was appointed Minister of Transport and Communications twice (1988–1989 and 1993–1994), as well as Deputy Minister of Development (1999–2000). He was a member of PASOK's executive office from 1995 to 1996 and served as the party's parliamentary representative from 1994 to 1996.

He served as Mayor of Nea Ionia for two terms from 2002 to 2010, and was also the First Vice President of the Central Union of Municipalities and Communities of Greece (KEDKE).
