= Giousouf =

Giousouf is a Greek surname. Notable people with the surname include:

- Aichan Kara Giousouf (born 1963), Greek politician
- Cemile Giousouf (born 1978), German-Greek politician
