= Athens B =

Greek electoral district

- Former Electoral constituency for the Hellenic Parliament
- Athens B within Attica

- Attica within Greece
- Regional units: Central Athens, North Athens, South Athens, West Athens
- Administrative region: Attica
- Electorate: 1.431.264 (January 2014)

Former Electoral constituency
- Created: 1958
- Abolished: 2018
- Number of members: 44 Members of Parliament
- Created from: Athens
- Replaced by: Athens B1, Athens B2, Athens B3

Athens B (Athens Beta; Greek: Β΄ Αθηνών) was a parliamentary constituency in Attica represented in the Hellenic Parliament. It covered a large part of urban area of Athens outside the Municipality of Athens, which forms the Athens A constituency. It was established in 1958, to separate the working-class districts from central Athens and reduce the electoral power of the then United Democratic Left, and was abolished in 2018.

As of September 2015, with 1.4 million registered voters, Athens B elected 44 Members of Parliament (MPs) by reinforced proportional representation and was the largest constituency in Greece. For this reason it was broken up in December 2018 into Athens B1 (North), Athens B2 (West), and Athens B3 (South).

== Election results ==
=== Legislative election ===
Athens B constituency results

Election	1st party	2nd party	3rd party	4th party	5th party	source
1974	New Democracy 46.58%	EK-ND 21.27%	ENAR 17.82%	PASOK 13.17%	Nat. Democ. Un. 0.93%	
1977	New Democracy 36.13%	PASOK 27.59%	KKE 16.08%	EDIK 8.29%	SPAD 5.19%	
1981	PASOK 48.79%	New Democracy 26.36%	KKE 18.04%	KKEEs 2.76%	KP 1.51%	
1985	PASOK 44.99%	New Democracy 34.79%	KKE 15.51%	KKEEs 3.56%	EPEN 0.47%	
June 1989	New Democracy 39.38%	PASOK 35.89%	SYN 20.83%	DIANA 1.20%	KKEEs-AA 0.41%	
November 1989	New Democracy 40.81%	PASOK 39.13%	SYN 16.88%	OIKOL 1.11%	Kollatos 0.37%	
1990	New Democracy 42.71%	PASOK 37.38%	SYN 16.30%	OIKOL 1.36%	DIANA 0.80%	
1993	PASOK 46.04%	New Democracy 34.07%	KKE 6.88%	POLAN 6.31%	SYN 5.28%	
1996	PASOK 38.75%	New Democracy 32.07%	SYN 8.68%	KKE 8.35%	DIKKI 5.89%	
2000	PASOK 43.89%	New Democracy 36.28%	KKE 8.21%	SYN 5.52%	DIKKI 2.99%	
2004	New Democracy 39.78%	PASOK 39.03%	KKE 8.78%	SYRIZA 5.61%	LAOS 2.82%	
2007	New Democracy 35.27%	PASOK 34.05%	KKE 12.11%	SYRIZA 8.94%	LAOS 5.04%	
2009	PASOK 40.23%	New Democracy 26.62%	KKE 10.84%	SYRIZA 7.40%	LAOS 7.28%	
May 2012	SYRIZA 21.82%	New Democracy 12.40%	ANEL 11.01%	KKE 9.64%	PASOK 9.07%	
June 2012	SYRIZA 31.43%	New Democracy 26.22%	PASOK 8.54%	DEMAR 7.72%	ANEL 7.38%	
January 2015	SYRIZA 37.08%	New Democracy 25.66%	The River 7.66%	KKE 6.93%	XA 5.73%	
September 2015	SYRIZA 35.21%	New Democracy 27.38%	KKE 6.80%	XA 5.64%	The River 5.58%	

== Members of Parliament ==
=== Members of the Hellenic Parliament, September 2015 – June 2019 ===
The following 44 MPs were elected in the September 2015 legislative election:

Name	Parliamentary group
Euclidis Tsakalotos	Syriza
Panagiotis Kouroumplis	Syriza
Nikos Pappas	Syriza
Ioannis Balafas	Syriza
Panos Skourletis	Syriza
Nikos Xydakis	Syriza
Nikolaos Toskas	Syriza
Christophoros Papadopoulos	Syriza
Georgios Dimaras	Syriza
Ioannis Theonas	Syriza
Christos Spirtzis	Syriza
Vasiliki Katrivanou	Syriza
Charoula Kafantari	Syriza
Ioannis Tsironis	Syriza
Eleni Avlonitou	Syriza
Anneta Kavvadia	Syriza
Eystathios Panagoulis	Syriza
Vangelis Meimarakis	New Democracy
Nikos Dendias	New Democracy
Kyriakos Mitsotakis	New Democracy
Adonis Georgiadis	New Democracy
Kostis Chatzidakis	New Democracy
Miltiadis Varvitsiotis	New Democracy
Georgios Koumoutsakos	New Democracy
Anna Karamanli	New Democracy
Sofia Voultepsi	New Democracy
Anna-Misel Asimakopoulou	New Democracy
Gerasimos Giakoumatos	New Democracy
Ekaterini Papakosta-Sidiropoulou	New Democracy
Giorgos Germenis	Golden Dawn
Ilias Panagiotaros	Golden Dawn
Eleni Zaroulia	Golden Dawn
Fofi Gennimata	Democratic Coalition
Andreas Loverdos	Democratic Coalition
Dimitris Koutsoumpas	KKE
Thanasis Pafilis	KKE
Christos Katsotis	KKE
Grigoris Psarianos	The River
Theocharis Theocharis	The River
Giorgos Amyras	The River
Panagiotis Kammenos	Independent Greeks
Thanasis Papachristopoulos	Independent Greeks
Vassilis Leventis	Enosi Kentroon
Georgios-Dimitrios Karras	Enosi Kentroon

=== Members of the Hellenic Parliament, January – September 2015 ===
The following MPs had been elected in the January 2015 legislative election:

Name	Parliamentary group
Eleni Avlonitou	Syriza
Ioannis Balafas	Syriza
Georgios Dimaras	Syriza
Giannis Dragasakis	Syriza
Theano Fotiou	Syriza
Nikos Hountis	Syriza
Kostas Isychos	Syriza
Charoula Kafantari	Syriza
Vasiliki Katrivanou	Syriza
Anneta Kavvadia	Syriza
Eystathios Panagoulis	Syriza
Nikos Pappas	Syriza
Dimitris Stratoulis	Syriza
Panagiotis Kouroumplis	Syriza
Euclidis Tsakalotos	Syriza
Nadia Valavani	Syriza
Yanis Varoufakis	Syriza
Dimitrios Vitsas	Syriza
Nikos Xydakis	Syriza
Anna-Misel Asimakopoulou	New Democracy
Kostis Chatzidakis	New Democracy
Nikos Dendias	New Democracy
Miltiadis Varvitsiotis	New Democracy
Sofia Voultepsi	New Democracy
Adonis Georgiadis	New Democracy
Gerasimos Giakoumatos	New Democracy
Anna Karamanli	New Democracy
Georgios Koumoutsakos	New Democracy
Vangelis Meimarakis	New Democracy
Kyriakos Mitsotakis	New Democracy
Giorgos Amyras	The River
Antigoni Lymperaki	The River
Grigoris Psarianos	The River
Harry Theocharis	The River
Giorgos Germenis	Golden Dawn
Ilias Panagiotaros	Golden Dawn
Eleni Zaroulia	Golden Dawn
Christos Katsotis	KKE
Dimitris Koutsoumpas	KKE
Thanasis Pafilis	KKE
Panagiotis Kammenos	Independent Greeks
Thanasis Papachristopoulos	Independent Greeks
Fofi Gennimata	PASOK
Andreas Loverdos	PASOK

=== Members of the Hellenic Parliament, June 2012 – January 2015 ===
Name	Parliamentary group
Sofia Sakorafa	Syriza
Panagiotis Kouroumblis	Syriza
Dimitrios Papadimoulis	Syriza
Ioannis Dragasakis	Syriza
Dimitrios Stratoulis	Syriza
Nadia Valavani	Syriza
Petros Tatsopoulos	Syriza
Efklidis Tsakalotos	Syriza
Stathis Panagoulis	Syriza
Apostolos Alexopoulos	Syriza
Haroula Kafandari	Syriza
Vasiliki Katrivanou	Syriza
Rena Dourou (replaced by Eleni Avlonitou on 18 March 2014)	Syriza
Kyriakos Mitsotakis	New Democracy
Kostis Chatzidakis	New Democracy
Sofia Voultepsi	New Democracy
Argyris Dinopoulos	New Democracy
Miltiadis Varvitsiotis	New Democracy
Adonis Georgiadis	New Democracy
Vangelis Meimarakis	New Democracy
Aris Spiliotopoulos	New Democracy
Gerasimos Giakoumatos	New Democracy
Vyron Polydoras	New Democracy
Anna Karamanli	New Democracy
Panos Panagiotopoulos	New Democracy
Ekaterini Papakosta-Sidiropoulou	New Democracy
Andreas Loverdos	PASOK
Michalis Chrisochoidis	PASOK
Apostolos Kaklamanis	PASOK
Mimis Androulakis	PASOK
Fotis Kouvelis	Democratic Left
Grigoris Psarianos	Democratic Left
Odyssefs-Nikos Voudouris	Democratic Left
Panos Kammenos	Independent Greeks
Ioannis Dimaras (Giannis)	Independent Greeks
Vassilios Kapernaros	Independent Greeks
Eleni Zaroulia	Golden Dawn
Georgios Germenis	Golden Dawn
Ilias Panagiotaros	Golden Dawn
Aleka Papariga	KKE
Spyridon Chalvatzis	KKE
Christos Katsotis	KKE
