= Movement for the Unity of Action of the Left =

Movement for the Unity of Action of the Left Κίνηση για την Ενότητα Δράσης της Αριστεράς Kinisi gia tin Enotita Drasis tis Aristeras
- Leader: Giannis Theonas
- Founded: 2000; 25 years ago
- Dissolved: 2019; 6 years ago
- Split from: Communist Party of Greece
- Ideology: Communism; Marxism-Leninism
- Political position: Far-left
- National affiliation: Coalition of the Radical Left

Website
- www.kedaaristera.gr

Movement for the Unity of Action of the Left (Greek: Κίνηση για την Ενότητα Δράσης της Αριστεράς, ΚΕΔΑ; KEDA) was a political party in Greece that was part of the Coalition of the Radical Left.

== History ==
KEDA was formed in the early 2000s, by a splinter group of major party officials of the Communist Party of Greece (KKE), most prominently Giannis Theonas (former MEP for KKE) and Mitsos Kostopoulos (ex-president of the parliamentary group of the KKE and ex-secretary general of the General Confederation of Greek Workers). However, Kostopoulos, left KEDA in May 2007.
