= Antonis Balomenakis =

Greek politician and lawyer (1954–2020)

- Born: 18 January 1954; Chania, Greece
- Died: 3 January 2020
- Occupation(s): Lawyer, Politician

Antonis Balomenakis (Greek: Αντώνης Μπαλωμενάκης; 18 January 1954 – 3 January 2020), was a Greek politician and lawyer.

He was born on 18 January 1954 in Chania and studied law at the University of Athens. He was member of the Hellenic Parliament between elected in the 20 September 2015 elections, representing Chania constituency for SYRIZA, until 11 July 2019. He died on 3 January 2020 at the age of 65.
