= Eleni Avlonitou =

Greek politician, swimmer and ergophysiologist

- Ελένη Αυλωνίτου
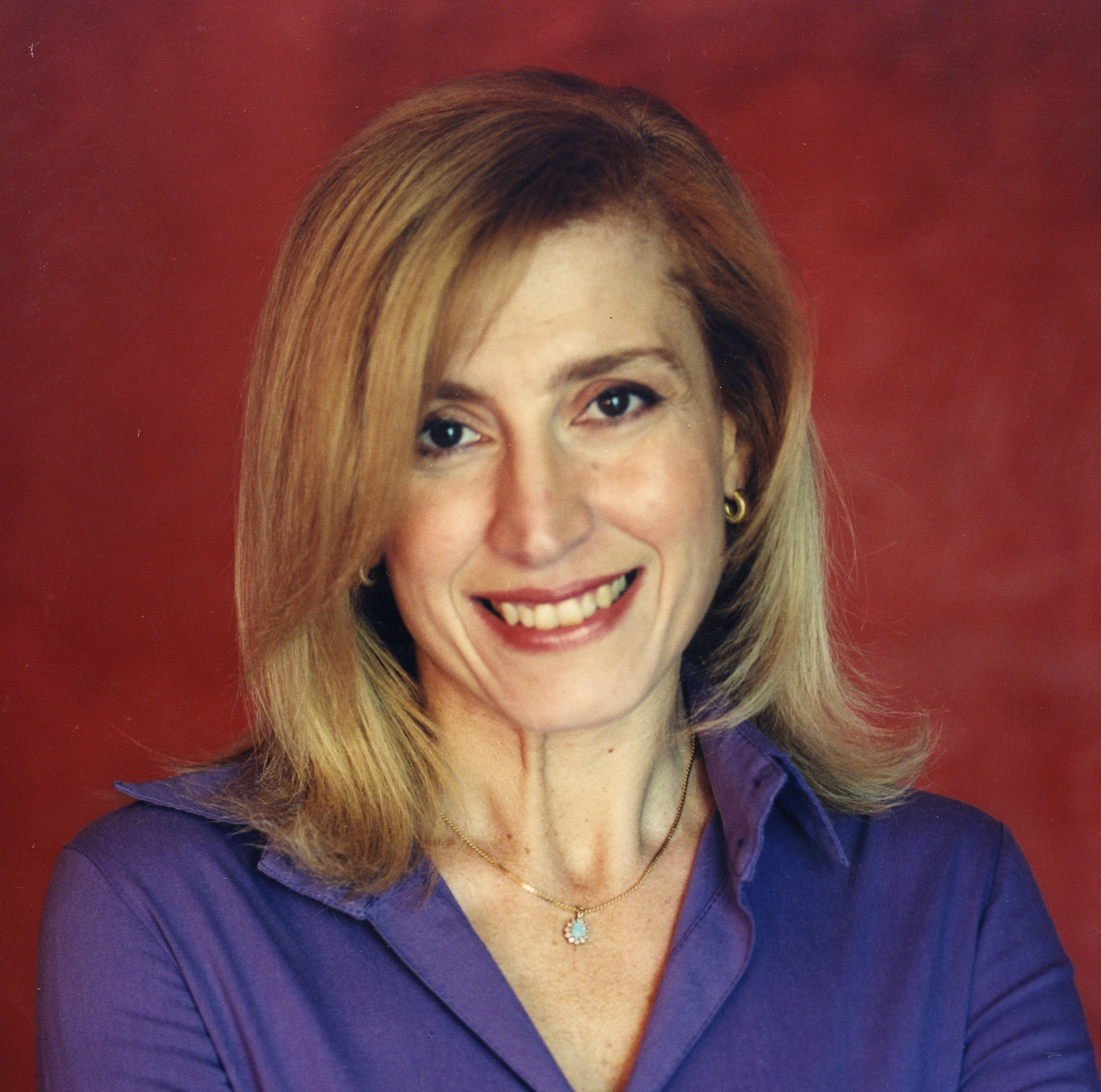

Member of the Hellenic Parliament for Athens B
- Incumbent
- Assumed office 27 March 2014

Personal details
- Born: 22 October 1958 (age 68) Athens, Greece
- Party: Coalition of the Radical Left (Syriza)
- Education: Indiana University
- Profession: Research ergophysiologist Former swimming champion
- Website: avlonitou.gr

Eleni Avlonitou (Greek: Ελένη Αυλωνίτου, born 22 October 1958, in Athens) is a former Greek swimming champion, ergophysiologist and politician of the Coalition of the Radical Left (Syriza). Since 2014, she has been a Member of the Hellenic Parliament.

== Swimming career ==
Eleni Avlonitou began her swimming career at the relatively late age of 10 at Ethnikos Gymnastikos Syllogos of Athens, one of the oldest sports clubs in Greece. Her entry into the club coincided with the hiring of the famed Greek swimming coach Giorgos Mpias as coach of the swimming team of Ethnikos Gymnastikos Syllogos. Their cooperation resulted in a sea change in Greek swimming. After a year Eleni Avlonitou was a national record holder in her age group. In 1971 at the age of 13 Eleni Avlonitou achieved her first women's national records (backstroke 100m and freestyle 800 m). In March 1972 she became the first Greek female swimmer to qualify for the Olympics and she participated in the Munich Olympics in 4 events (individual medley 200/400 m, freestyle 400/800 m). That year the Greek Association of Sports Press voted her best swimmer of 1972. In 1973 Eleni Avlonitou was voted best female athlete of the year by the Greek Association of Sports Press. After interrupting swimming for one year in 1976, Eleni Avlonitou achieved a comeback in 1977, improving her national records 12 times until 1980.

In all Eleni Avlonitou achieved 121 Greek national records in every category (3-1969, 13-1970, 29-1971, 42-1972, 21-1973, 1-1974, 4-1977, 1-1978, 7-1979) in 7 individual events (freestyle 100/200/400/800 m, individual medley 200/400 m, backstroke 100 m) and 2 relay events (4 X 100 freestyle and 4 X 100 medley).

During her swimming career Eleni Avlonitou won 35 Greek national championship medals (28 gold, 6 silver, 1 bronze). She also won 14 Balkan Games medals (7 gold, 4 silver, 3 bronze) and held Balkan records in 4 individual events (freestyle 400/800 m and individual medley 200/400 m).

== Research ergophysiologist ==
In 1980 Eleni Avlonitou graduated from the University of Athens with a BSc in Physical Education and retired from competitive swimming in order to continue her education in the United States. Eleni Avlonitou attended Indiana University Bloomington and received her MSc in Physical Education in 1983 and PhD in ergophysiology in 1988.

In 1988 Eleni Avlonitou took a position as research ergophysiologist at the Hellenic Sports Research Institute of the Olympic Athletic Center of Athens, where she remained until 2013. Additionally she has held the following advisory and teaching positions:

- 1989–1995: Scientific advisor of the Greek Swimming Federation.
- 1990–1992: Lecturer at the Physical Education and Sport Sciences Department of the Aristotle University of Thessaloniki.
- 1994–1998: Member of the Sports Medicine Committee of the European Swimming League.
- 1999–2003 and 2012- today: Visiting professor at the National School of Public Health, Athens.

== Author ==
Eleni Avlonitou has written two scientific books in Greek, Athletic Performance in Swimming (1991, 2000) and Woman and Exercise (1993).

== Sports commentator ==
From 2001 to 2008 Eleni Avlonitou wrote a weekly sports column, aptly named "Eleni's view", in the Athens daily newspaper Avgi.

In 2001 and 2002 Eleni Avlonitou hosted a weekly hour-long television sports program "Sports with Eleni" that was broadcast on the Athens area TV channel SEVEN.

== Sports administration ==
Eleni Avlonitou is an active member of the Hellenic Olympians Association and has been on the Administrative Council during the years 1992–1996 and 2002–2010.

In 2013 Eleni Avlonitou was elected Member of the Administrative Council of Ethnikos Gymnastikos Syllogos of Athens, her sport club during her active swimming years. In January 2016 Eleni Avlonitou was elected President of Ethnikos Gymnastikos Syllogos of Athens.

== Political career ==
As an undergraduate student in Athens in the 1970s Eleni Avlonitou was a member of the student organization of the left Panspoudastiki S. K.

In 1989 she joined the newly formed political party of the left, Synaspismos, a coalition of the Greek Communist Party, the eurocommunist Greek Left and other political groups of the left. When the Synaspismos coalition broke up in 1991 after the unilateral departure of the Greek Communist Party, Eleni Avlonitou remained in the unified political party "Synaspismos of the Left and Progress" which resulted. She was active in the sports department of Synaspismos.

In 1996 Eleni Avlonitou was a candidate for parliament with Synaspismos in the Athens second constituency.

In 2000 Eleni Avonitou was elected to the Central Political Committee of Synaspismos.

In 2002 Eleni Avlonitou was a candidate for the Prefectural Council of Athens with the list "Greek Prefecture - Active Citizens", that was headed by Manolis Glezos.

She supported the participation of Synaspismos in the Coalition of the Radical Left (SY.RIZ.A), which was formed in 2004 and that year she was again a candidate for parliament with SYRIZA in the Athens second constituency.

In the 2006 and 2010 municipal elections Eleni Avlonitou was candidate for mayor of Galatsi, a municipality in the Athens second constituency, heading the municipal council list "Citizens in Action". In both years she was elected to the Galatsi municipal council. She was particularly active in successful local action to avert the conversion of the Galatsi Olympic Hall into a shopping mall.

In 2012 Eleni Avlonitou was again a candidate for parliament with SYRIZA in the Athens second constituency and she was the runner up of the SYRIZA list. In 2014, when SYRIZA MP Rena Dourou resigned her parliament seat in order to run for Attica Governor in the local elections, Eleni Avlonitou replaced her in Parliament.

Eleni Avlonitou was reelected to parliament in the January 2015 legislative elections and again in the September 2015 legislative elections.

Eleni Avlonitou is a member of the Standing Committee on National Defense and Foreign Affairs and the Standing Committee on Cultural and Educational Affairs of the Hellenic Parliament.
