= Vasiliki Katrivanou =

Greek politician and psychologist (born 1967)

- Βασιλική Κατριβάνου
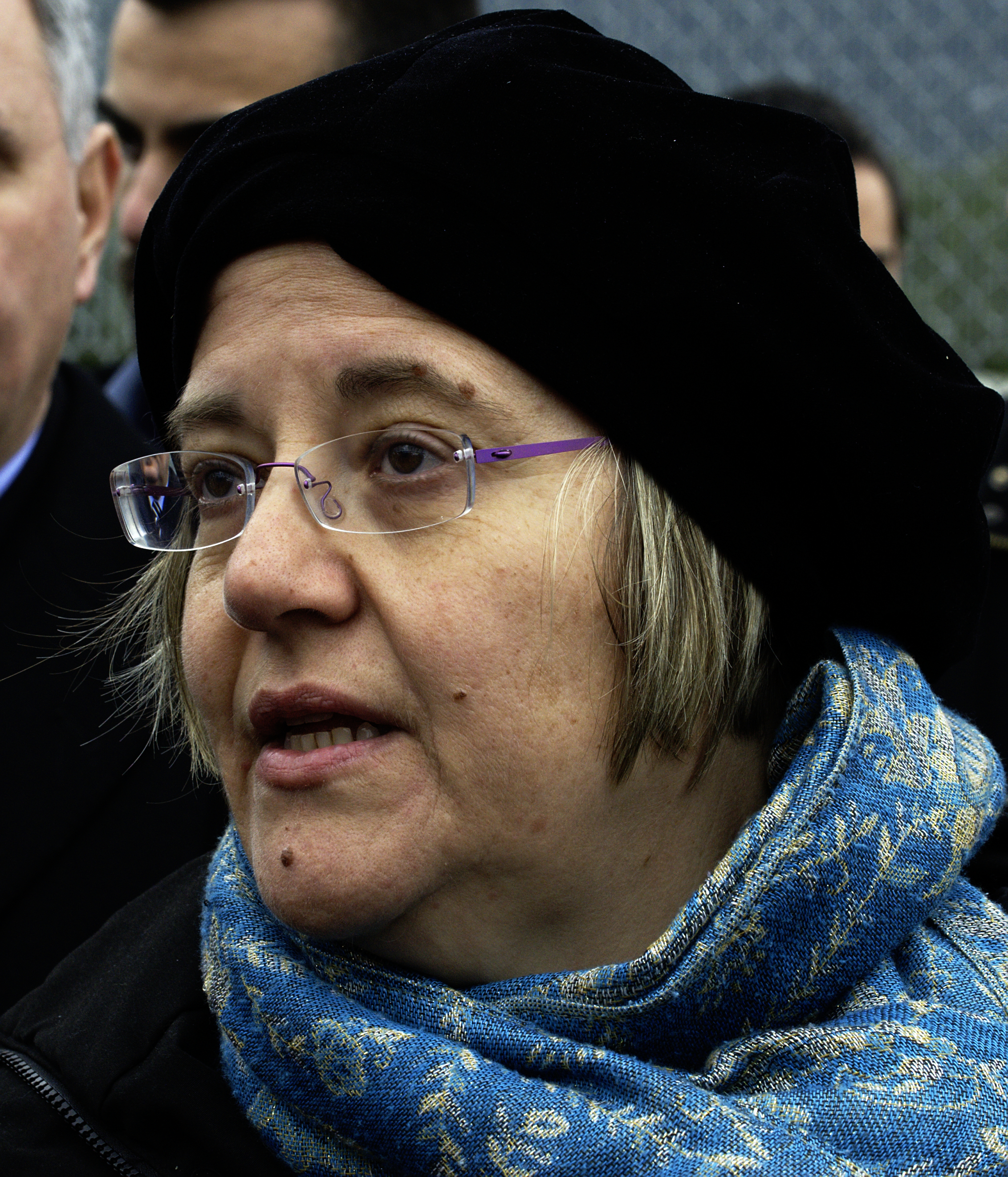

Member of the Parliament of the Hellenes
- In office 6 May 2012 – 22 May 2016

Personal details
- Born: June 24, 1967 (age 59) Athens, Greece
- Party: SYRIZA
- Education: University of Portland; National and Kapodistrian University of Athens
- Occupation: Politician and psychologist

Vasiliki Koutrivanou (Greek: Βασιλική Κατριβάνου; born 24 June 1967) is a Greek psychotherapist, politician and former member of SYRIZA. She studied Psychology and Conflict Resolution at the University of Portland and Law at the University of Athens. She speaks English and French.

She joined her student years on the Left and the anti-fascist movement.

In June 2012 and January 2015, she was elected MP for Athens B with SYRIZA and renewed her term of office in the September 2015 elections. She was a member of the SYRIZA Human Rights Commission, with a special focus on the oppressed social groups: women, LGBT, Romani people, disabled, immigrants, refugees, prisoners. She regularly writes about these issues in the left press. She also belongs to the Movement of 53+.

On 22 May 2016, she delivered her seat as she voted against a series of articles on the omnibus bills that the government put in the House, but said she remained a member of SYRIZA. She was replaced by Giorgos Kyritsis.

On 2 June 2017, she was appointed a full member of the Board of Directors of the Anti-Drug Agency (OKANA).
