= Nikos Michos =

Greek politician

Nikos Michos (Greek: Νίκος Μίχος) is a Greek far-right politician and member of the Hellenic Parliament.

He was elected in 2012 as a candidate for the Golden Dawn party.

On 26 September 2017, he announced he had resigned from Golden Dawn and would henceforth sit as an independent MP.

On 2 November 2017, he declared that he had joined the Greek Solution party of Kyriakos Velopoulos, but his departure from that party was announced a week later.

On 29 January 2018, Michos said he had joined Popular Orthodox Rally, the party led by Georgios Karatzaferis that had lots its position in parliament in the May 2012 Greek legislative election.
