= Ilias Kostopanagiotou =

Greek politician (1944–2025)

- Ηλίας Κωστοπαναγιώτου

Member of the Hellenic Parliament for Phocis
- In office 25 January 2015 – 11 June 2019

Personal details
- Born: 1 February 1944; Lidoriki, German-occupied Greece
- Died: 1 February 2025 (aged 81); Lamia, Greece
- Political party: Syriza
- Education: National and Kapodistrian University of Athens
- Occupation: Doctor

Ilias Kostopanagiotou (Greek: Ηλίας Κωστοπαναγιώτου; 1 February 1944 – 1 February 2025) was a Greek politician. A member of Syriza, he served in the Hellenic Parliament from 2015 to 2019.

Kostopanagiotou died in Lamia on 1 February 2025, his 81st birthday.
