= Dimitris Kammenos =

Greek politician

Dimitris Kammenos MP
- Δημήτρης Καμμένος

Deputy Minister of Infrastructure, Transport and Networks
- In office 23 September 2015 – 23 September 2015
- Prime Minister: Alexis Tsipras
- Succeeded by: Panagiotis Sgouridis

Member of the Hellenic Parliament for Piraeus B
- In office 25 January 2015 – 7 July 2019

Personal details
- Born: 27 April 1966 (age 59) Athens, Greece
- Party: Independent

Dimitris Kammenos (Greek: Δημήτρης Καμμένος) is a Greek politician who served for less than one day as Deputy Minister of Infrastructure, Transport and Networks in the Second Tsipras Cabinet.

== Political career ==
Kammenos was elected as a Member of Parliament for the Independent Greeks (ANEL) party representing Piraeus B region.

In the Second Tsipras Cabinet, on 23 September 2015, Kammenos was sworn in as Deputy Minister of Infrastructure, Transport and Networks, "on the recommendation of his coalition partner" Panos Kammenos. Syriza MP Vassiliki Katrivanou expressed "disappointment and indignation" at the appointment of Kammenos, and appealed to Alexis Tsipras to remove him from office. Following pressure from within the government, Kammenos was asked to step down, according to party leader Panos Kammenos, "until the truth was established" surrounding his "anti-Semitic and homophobic remarks." He resigned after just 12 hours in Cabinet.

On 16 June 2018, Dimitris Kammenos voted against his party and supported a motion of no-confidence against the Second Tsipras Cabinet concerning the Prespa agreement, a proposal that would result in the Republic of Macedonia being renamed the Republic of North Macedonia. Kammenos was expelled from the party immediately after the vote, leaving the coalition with a majority of three. In response to the Greco-FYROMese agreement, Kammenos announced creation of his own political party Force of Hellenism (Greek: Δύναμη Ελληνισμού), whose goal would be to stop the Macedonian naming deal.

== Controversy ==
In June 2015, Kammenos posted a doctored image on Facebook of the gate to Auschwitz concentration camp, replacing the words "Work Sets You Free" (German: Arbeit Macht Frei) with "We Stay in Europe", mocking pro-EU demonstrators. Kammenos later apologised, saying: "The comparison may have been unfortunate but there is an economic holocaust under way in my country." He was criticised for his statements by the Central Board of Jewish Communities in Greece and others.

In the past, Kammenos has also insinuated that Jewish people were responsible for the September 11 attacks, falsely claiming, "and let's not forget that among the 2,500 Jews working at the Twin Towers not one went to work that day."
