= Nikolaos Moraitis =

Greek politician

Member of the Hellenic Parliament for Aitolo-Akarnania
- Incumbent
- Assumed office 2007

Personal details
- Born: 29 August 1957 (age 69) Thyrio, Kingdom of Greece
- Party: Communist Party of Greece
- Education: Komotini Law School

Nikolaos Moraitis (born 29 August 1957), is a Greek politician. He has served as a member of the Hellenic Parliament since 2008, representing Aitolo-Akarnania for the Communist Party of Greece

== Background ==
Moraitis is a construction worker by profession. He is the vice-chair of the Federation of Farmers’ Association of Aitoloakarnania
