= Spyros Danellis =

Greek politician

Spyros Danellis MP
- Σπύρος Δανέλλης
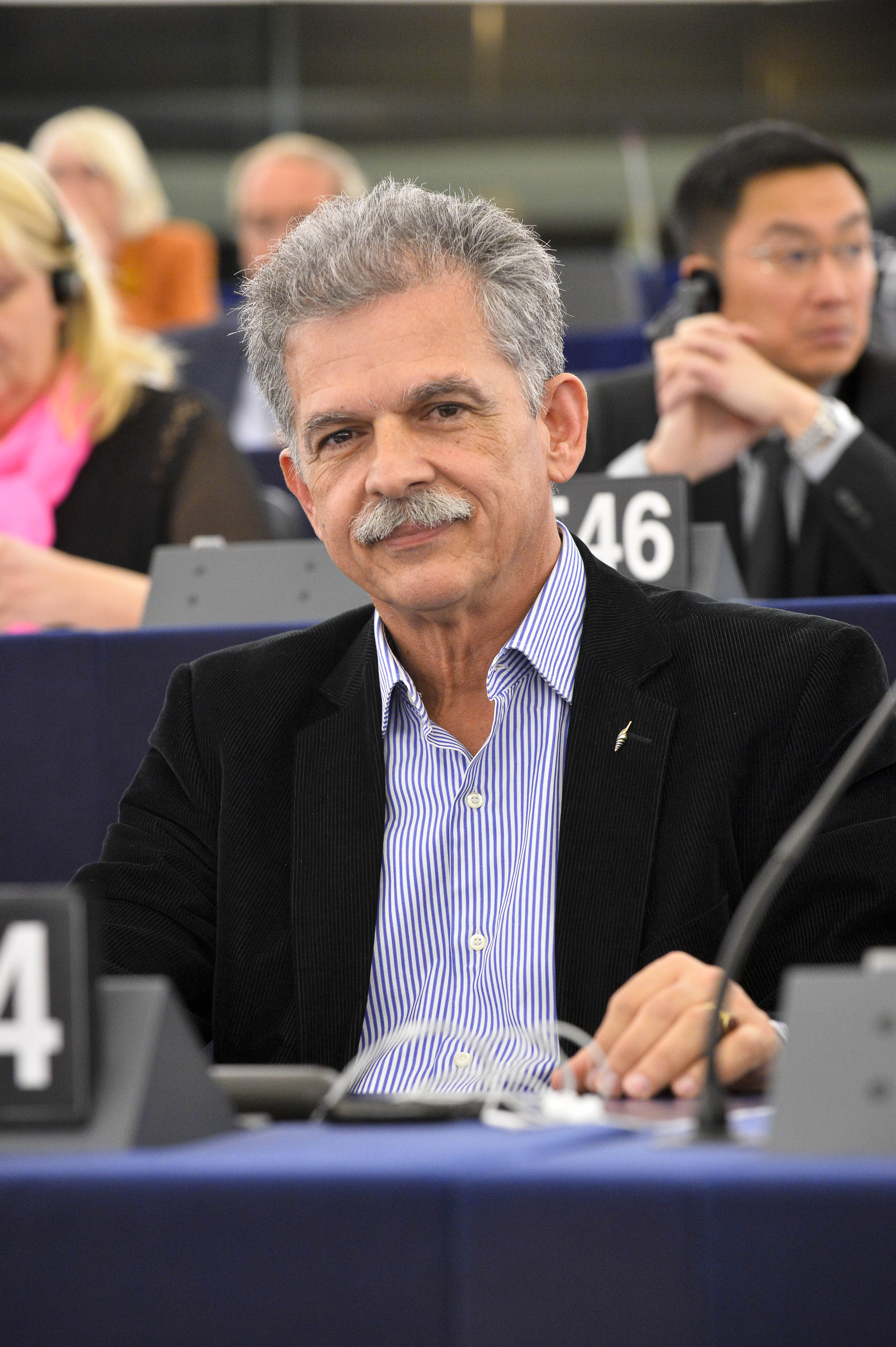

Member of the Hellenic Parliament for Heraklion
- In office 27 January 2015 – 7 July 2019
- In office 1996–2000

Member of European Parliament for Greece
- In office 8 September 2009 – 30 June 2014

Mayor of Hersonisos
- In office 2003–2009

Personal details
- Born: 28 January 1955 (age 71) Heraklion, Greece

Spyros Danellis (Greek: Σπύρος Δανέλλης; born 28 January 1955) is a Greek politician and a Panhellenic Socialist Movement Member of European Parliament since October 2009.

== Political career ==
Danellis was a Member of the Hellenic Parliament for Synaspismos between 1996 and 2000, and served as mayor of Hersonisos from 2003 to 2009.

Danellis was elected as a PASOK Member of European Parliament in October 2009, and served until June 2014.
