= Giorgos Koumoutsakos =

Greek politician

Giorgos Koumoutsakos Γιώργος Κουμουτσάκος MP
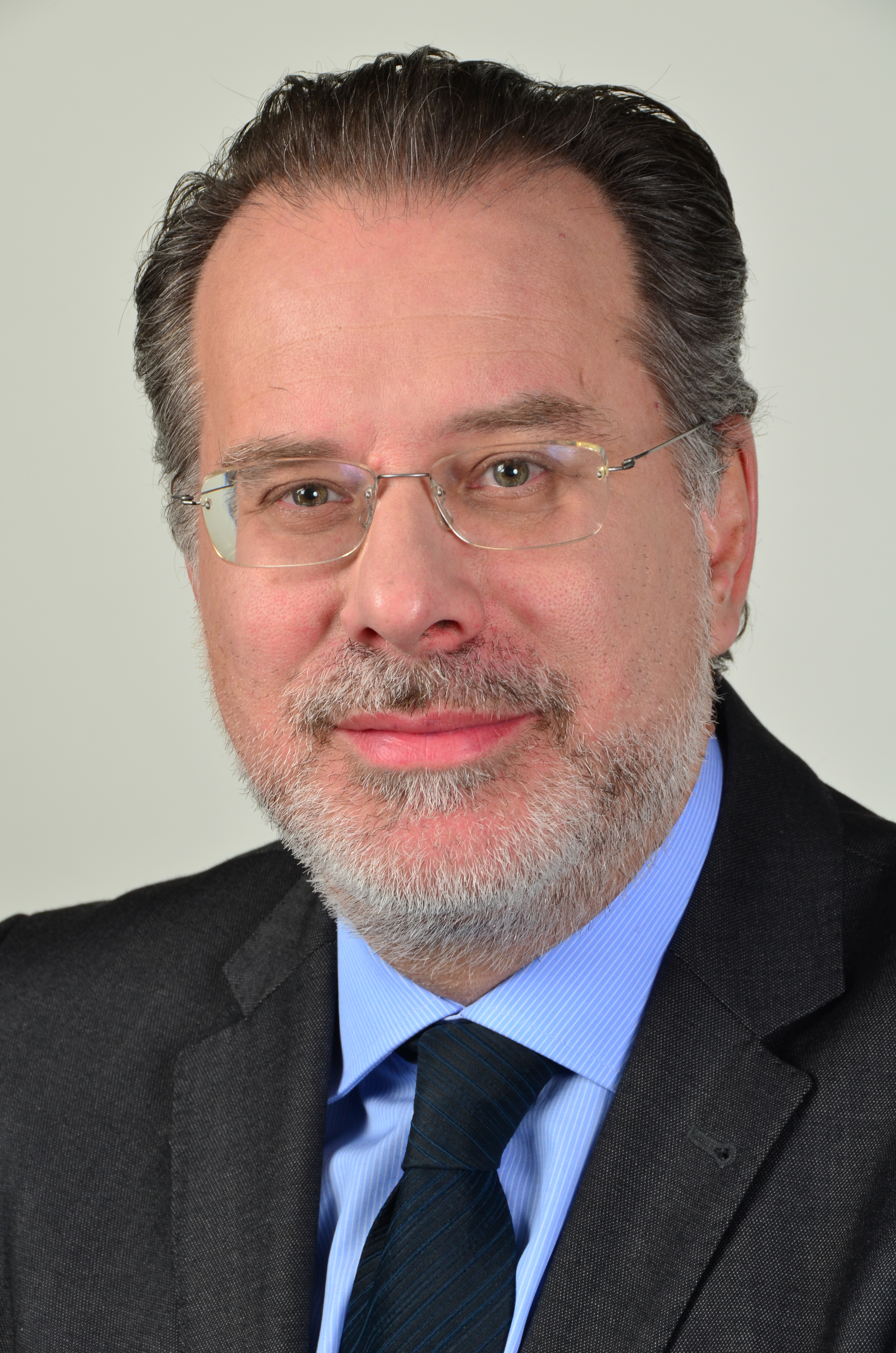

Member of the Hellenic Parliament for Athens B
- Incumbent
- Assumed office 25 January 2015

Member of the European Parliament for Greece
- In office 14 July 2009 – 30 June 2014

Personal details
- Born: September 17, 1961 (age 64) Athens, Greece
- Party: New Democracy

Giorgos Koumoutsakos (born 17 September 1961, Athens) is a Greek politician with the liberal New Democracy party, and a member of the European Parliament.
