= Christos Pappas =

Greek politician

Christos Pappas (Greek: Χρήστος Παππάς; born 1962, Athens) is a Greek politician, convicted criminal and a former deputy leader of the Greek Parliament for the neo-Nazi Golden Dawn party.

== Criminal conviction ==
After a trial lasting five years, on 22 October 2020, Pappas was sentenced to 13 years and 3 months in prison for administrating a criminal organization. As the Greek Police were not able to track him, it was thought that he may have fled abroad and a European arrest warrant was issued.

On 1 July 2021, however, he was arrested at an apartment in Central Athens, Greece. Police also arrested a woman on the charge of offering shelter to the wanted criminal.
