= Chrysoula Katsavria-Sioropoulou =

Greek politician

Chrysoula Katsavria-Sioropoulou (Greek: Χρυσούλα Κατσαβριά-Σιωροπούλου; born 7 August 1959 in Anavra) is a Greek politician.

In the January 2015 Greek legislative election she was elected as a member of the Hellenic Parliament with SYRIZA representing the constituency of Karditsa. She was reelected in the September 2015 Greek legislative election.
