= Leonidas Grigorakos =

Greek politician (1953–2024)

- Λεωνίδας Γρηγοράκος

Member of the Hellenic Parliament for Constituency of Laconia
- In office 9 April 2000 – 11 June 2019

Personal details
- Born: 22 July 1953 Sparta, Greece
- Died: 9 February 2024 (aged 70) Athens, Greece
- Party: Pasok
- Education: Aristotle University of Thessaloniki
- Occupation: Doctor

Leonidas Grigorakos (Greek: Λεωνίδας Γρηγοράκος; 22 July 1953 – 9 February 2024) was a Greek doctor and politician of Pasok.

First elected in 2000, he became vice-president of the Hellenic Parliament in 2012.

Grigorakos died in Athens on 9 February 2024, at the age of 70.
