= Moustafá Moustafá =

Greek politician

Member of the Parliament for Rodopi
- Incumbent
- Assumed office 2015
- In office 1996–2000

Personal details
- Born: 1955 (age 70–71) Komotini, Greece
- Party: Syriza

Moustafá Moustafá (Greek: Μουσταφά Μουσταφά, romanized: Moustafa Moustafa, Turkish: Μustafa Mustafa; born 1955) is a Greek politician of Turkish descent. In January 2015, Moustafá was elected to Greek Parliament as an MP of Syriza. He received the largest number of votes in his constituency, Rodopi. Previously, he was a Synaspismos MP between 1996 and 2000 and unsuccessfully ran for re-election with Syriza in 2009.

Moustafá is a graduate of the Medical School of the University of Istanbul and making medicine in Komotini. He is married to psychologist Elvan Moustafá and has two daughters.
