= Grigoris Psarianos =

Greek politician (born 1954)

Grigoris Psarianos (Greek: Γρηγόρης Ψαριανός), born 1954 in Athens, is a Greek politician, a former member of the Hellenic Parliament for The River, who was representing Athens B.

== Biography ==
Ηe was born in 1954 in Athens. His mother was the sister of Civil War commander of Greek People's Liberation ArmyELAS Nikiforos. He studied at the Graduate School for Industrial Studies of Piraeus, which later became the University of Piraeus. He then started a career of journalist and music producer. He worked for radio stations Athens 984, of which he was a founding member, Flash 961, 941 Communication, SevenX, KLIK FM 92,6 and ANT1, emitting daily from 1987 to 2010.

He was a member of the Communist Party of Greece (Interior) [KKE (Interior)] until 1987, and then a founding member of the Greek Left (EAR), of the Synaspismos coalition in '89-90 and of the Democratic Left (DIMAR). He was elected alderman of Athens with the open city list in the 2006 local election. He was first elected MP in the 2007 Greek legislative election for Syriza and reelected in 2009 election. In 2010 he left Synaspismos (then part of the multi-party Syriza coalition) with fellow MPs Fotis Kouvelis, Thanasis Leventis and Nikos Tsoukalis when the Renewal Wing platform of Synaspismos split from the party at its 6th congress.

He was then reelected MP with DIMAR at the May and June 2012 legislative election. He was expelled from DIMAR in 2014 and successfully competed in the January and September 2015 for The River (To Potami). Since May 2019 he belongs to the party Nea Demokratia.
