= Giorgos Dimaras =

Greek politician

Giorgos Dimaras Γιώργος Δημαράς MP

Member of the Hellenic Parliament for Athens B
- In office 25 January 2015 – 11 June 2019

Personal details
- Born: December 16, 1946 (age 79) Missolonghi, Greece
- Party: Ecologist Greens
- Other political affiliations: Syriza
- Education: Athens University of Economics and Business

Giorgos Dimaras (Greek: Γιώργος Δημαράς; born 16 December 1946) is a Greek politician. He is a member of the Ecologist Greens, but was elected as a Syriza Member of the Hellenic Parliament for Athens B at the January 2015 Greek legislative election.

== Early life and education ==
Dimaras was born in Missolonghi to a rural family. He attended Palamaiki School in Missolonghi before moving to Athens to work and study. He studied economics at the Athens University of Economics and Business.

== Political career ==
Dimaras has been the Coordinator of the Executive Committee of the Ecologist Greens. Dimaras was a candidate for the Ecologist Greens in the 2014 European Parliament election in Greece.

Following the January 2015 Greek legislative election, Dimaras was elected as a Member of the Hellenic Parliament for Athens B on the Syriza ballot. This was due to the electoral agreement made before the election by the Ecologist Greens and Syriza. He is the first ever Ecologist Green MP and the first environmentalist MP since the dissolution of Alternative Ecologists in 1993.

Dimaras was one of only five Syriza MPs to reject state cars for their transportation at the request of Alexis Tsipras. Speaking at the first meeting of the Syriza parliamentary group, Dimaras said: "We, the MPs of Ecology and the Left, must prove by our deeds that we are not the same as the others who have turned politics into a lucrative profession."

Dimaras was appointed Vice Minister of Environment at the September 2018 Tsipras cabinet reshuffle.
