= Anna Karamanli =

Greek politician

- Άννα Καραμανλή
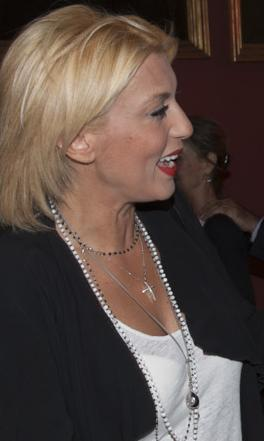

Member of the Hellenic Parliament
- Incumbent
- Assumed office 12 May 2012

Personal details
- Born: May 10, 1968 (age 57) Thessaloniki, Greece
- Party: New Democracy
- Education: Aristotle University of Thessaloniki
- Occupation: Athlete; Sports journalist

Anna Arkadiou Karamanli (Greek: Άννα Αρκαδίου Καραμανλή, born 10 May 1968) is a Greek politician, sports journalist, and former athlete.

== Biography ==
=== Athletic and journalistic career ===
Karamanli was a track and field athlete at Aris Thessaloniki, specialising in the long jump and member of the National Track-and-Field Group. She achieved a distinction at the Balkan Athletics Championships in 1985 and came first at the Women's Panhellenic Athletics Championships in 1985. She also competed in the Mediterranean Games and the European Games, but retired from athletics after the birth of her first child.

During her athletic career, Karamanli had received a degree in physical education and sports sciences from Aristotle University of Thessaloniki and studied journalism at the "Bona" School. In 1991, she became a sports journalist for the ERT, presenting "Some time in the Stadium" (Στο Στάδιο Κάποτε) on ERT3. From 1994 to 2009, Karamanli was editor-in-chief of the ERT Sports News Bulletin and a presenter on the main news bulletin from 1995 until 2012. She was also the first female presenter of Αθλητική Κυριακή from 2001 to 2009.

=== Political career ===
Karamanli entered politics in 2006 as a member of the New Democracy party, first serving as a prefectural councillor from 2006 to 2010, when the Greek prefectures were abolished, and then deputy regional councillor of West Attica. She has been a member of the political committee of New Democracy in 2007. She was elected to the Greek parliament in the May 2012 elections as a representative of Athens B. She retained this seat in the June 2012, January 2015, and September 2015 elections. After her constituency was divided, she was elected as representative of the Athens C constituency in the 2019 Greek legislative election.

In September 2014, Karamanli attracted media attention for a speech in Parliament in which she told the finance minister Gikas Hardouvelis, a member of her own government, to "go fuck himself."

== Personal life ==
Karamanli married the Greek professional basketballer Michalis Romanidis, whom she met in the 1980s when they were both members of Aris Thessaloniki. She has one child, Stratis (born 1991) with Michalis Romanides and another one Elisavet Kourtesis (2001). She is not related to former Greek Prime Minister Kostas Karamanlis.

As of 2014, Karamanli was pursuing a PhD at the University of Peloponnese with a thesis on "The role of the media in combating violence."
