= Alexandros Meikopoulos =

Greek politician

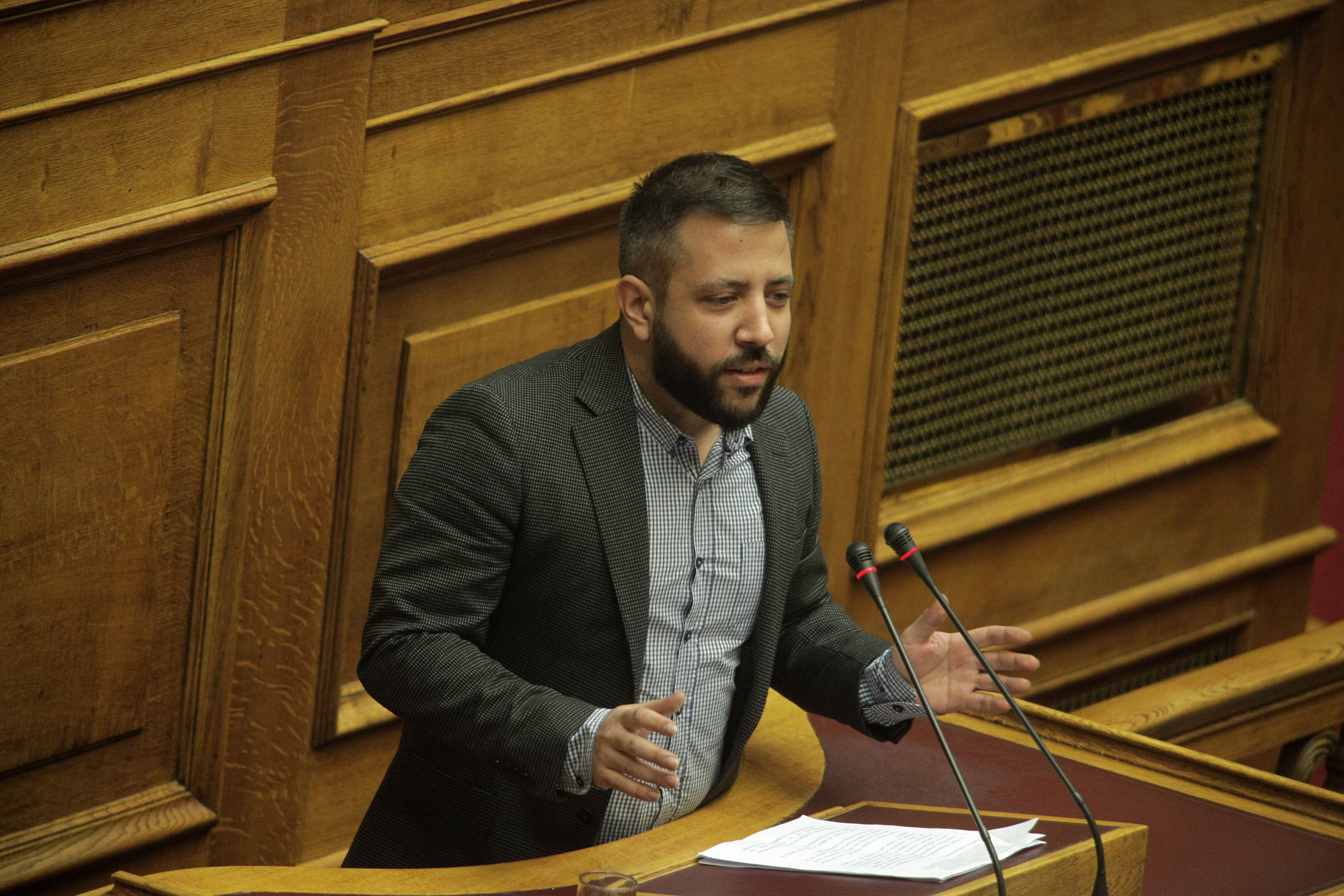

Member of the Hellenic Parliament for Magnesia
- Incumbent
- Assumed office 2012

Personal details
- Party: Syriza

Alexandros Meikopoulos is a Greek politician who is a member of the Hellenic Parliament. He was elected in 2012, 2015, 2019, and twice in 2023.
