= Nektarios Santorinios =

Greek politician (1972–2023)

Member of the Hellenic Parliament
- In office 25 January 2015 – 13 February 2023
- Constituency: Dodecanese

Personal details
- Born: 17 May 1972 Rhodes, Greece
- Died: 13 February 2023 (aged 50) Rhodes, Greece
- Party: Syriza
- Education: National Technical University of Athens

Nektarios Santorinios (Greek: Νεκτάριος Σαντορινιός; 17 May 1972 – 13 February 2023) was a Greek politician. A member of Syriza, he served in the Hellenic Parliament from 2015 to 2023.

Santorinios died of cancer in Rhodes on 13 February 2023, at the age of 50.
