= Giannis Theonas =

Greek politician (1940–2021)

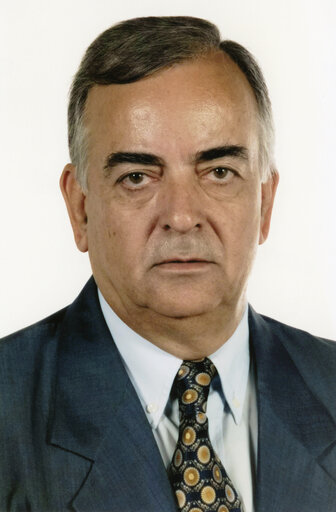
Theonas in 2000

Giannis Theonas (Greek: Γιάννης Θεωνάς; 29 October 1940 – 12 September 2021) was a Greek politician who served as a Member of the European Parliament for the Communist Party of Greece and as a Member of the Greek Parliament for Syriza. In 2010, after his resignation from the Communist Party of Greece, he and some other politicians founded the Movement for the Unity of Action of the Left, which later merged with Syriza. He was born in Naxos.

== Knife attack ==
On 3 June 1994, a far-right extremist stabbed Giannis Theonas and some other politicians while they were delivering a political speech about the 1994 European Parliament election in Greece. He was immediately transported to a nearby hospital and survived the attack.
