= Ioannis Giokas =

Greek politician

Member of the Hellenic Parliament for Attica
- Incumbent
- Assumed office 2008
- Preceded by: Dimos Koumpouris

Personal details
- Born: 22 January 1980 (age 46) Athens, Greece
- Party: Communist Party of Greece
- Education: Komotini Law School

Ioannis Giokas (born 22 January 1980), is a Greek politician. He has served as a member of the Hellenic Parliament since 2008, representing Attica for the Communist Party of Greece

== Background ==
Giokas is a lawyer and member of the Athens Bar Association. He is fluent in English and German.
