= Sofia Voultepsi =

Greek politician

- Σοφία Βούλτεψη

Deputy Minister of Migration and Asylum
- Incumbent
- Assumed office 8 July 2019
- Prime Minister: Kyriakos Mitsotakis

Personal details
- Born: 10 October 1956 (age 69) Piraeus, Greece
- Party: New Democracy
- Education: University of Athens

Sofia Voultepsi (Greek: Σοφία Βούλτεψη) is a Greek politician, member of the Hellenic Parliament for New Democracy and former journalist.

She was the first female Government Spokesperson in the government of Antonis Samaras.

== Biography ==
She was born in Piraeus, daughter of the prominent journalist Yannis Voultepsis (1923-2010). She studied at the Italian School of Athens and attended the Athens Law School (Department of Public Law and Political Sciences).

She entered politics in 2004 as an elected Member of Parliament (Athens B) with New Democracy party.
