= Anna-Misel Asimakopoulou =

Greek politician

Anna-Misel Asimakopoulou MEP
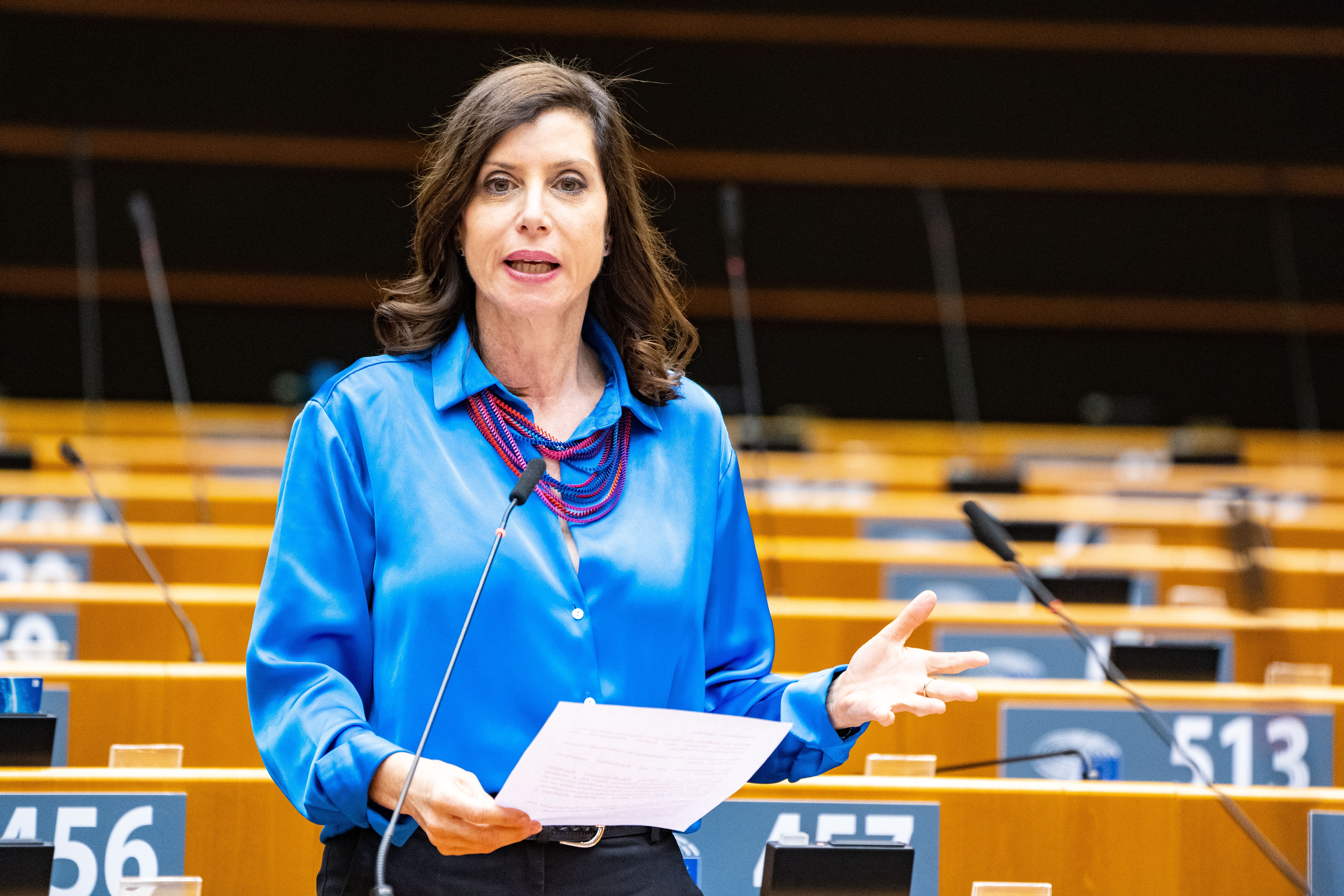

Member of the European Parliament for Greece
- In office 2 July 2019 – 16 July 2024

Personal details
- Born: 27 March 1967 (age 59) New York, New York, U.S.
- Party: New Democracy (Greece)
- Education: Bryn Mawr College; Cornell Law School

Anna-Misel Asimakopoulou (Greek: Άννα-Μισέλ Ασημακοπούλου, born 27 March 1967) is a Greek lawyer and politician who was elected as a Member of the European Parliament in 2019.

In March 2024, she became embroiled in a significant email leak stemming from her use of Ministry of the Interior resources to reach out to Greek voters across Europe. The scandal led to her resignation from her candidacy as an MEP in the same month.

== Biography ==
She was born in 1967 in New York, the firstborn daughter of nuclear physics professor Panagiotis Asimakopoulos, who hailed from Pylos in Messinia. Panagiotis Asimakopoulos was a classmate at the Anavryta School with the former King Constantine, who later became the godfather of Anna-Misel along with his wife, former Queen Anne-Marie. She spent her early years in Palaio Faliro, Attica, and later moved with her family to Ioannina when her father was appointed professor of Nuclear Physics at the University of Ioannina.

She studied Economics at Bryn Mawr College in Pennsylvania, United States, and Law specializing in International Legal Relations at Cornell University in New York. She further specialized at the London School of Economics in the United Kingdom, at the Law School of the University of Madrid in Spain, and at the Institut d'Études Françaises d'Avignon in France.

Anna-Misel Asimakopoulou worked as a lawyer in New York, specializing in financial transactions and international banking law, and she continues to be a member of the New York Bar Association. She returned to Greece in the early 1990s, where she directed the non-profit EGNATIA IPIROS Foundation in Ioannina, focusing on Regional Development, Information and Communication Technologies, and European Programs. Additionally, she worked as an expert for the European Commission, evaluating European Programs, and in the private sector for consulting firms in Brussels and Luxembourg.

== Political career ==
Anna-Misel Asimakopoulou began her involvement in public affairs in 2007 when she was elected Municipal Councilor of Ioannina with the coalition led by Nikos Gontas. During her term in local government, she served as Deputy Mayor for European Programs, Press Officer of the Municipal Authority, and Vice President of the Municipal Regional Theater of Ioannina. She also sat on the Board of the Municipal Water and Sewage Company of Ioannina and represented the Municipality of Ioannina at the Center for Traditional Crafts of Ioannina.

In the parliamentary elections of June 2012, she was elected as a Member of Parliament for Ioannina with the New Democracy party, becoming the first female MP ever elected in the prefecture. She was appointed in 2013 by the then Prime Minister and President of New Democracy, Antonis Samaras, as the Press Officer of New Democracy and Head of the Political Ideology Production Committee at the 9th Congress of New Democracy.

In the elections of January and September 2015, she was elected as a Member of Parliament for the 2nd Athens constituency with the New Democracy party. During her first year as MP for Athens B, she served as Shadow Minister of Fiscal Policy. Later, under the presidency of Kyriakos Mitsotakis, she assumed the responsibilities of Shadow Minister for Development and Competitiveness (January 2016 - November 2016), and recently took over the new portfolio of Digital Policy, Telecommunications, and Information for New Democracy.

On April 25, 2019, she resigned as MP due to her candidacy in the 2019 European Parliament elections.

In the European Parliament, Asimakopoulou has since been serving on the Committee on International Trade and the Committee on Petitions (2019–2020). In 2020, she also joined the Special Committee on Artificial Intelligence in a Digital Age. In addition to her committee assignments, Asimakopoulou has been part of the parliament's delegation for relations with Israel since 2021. She is also a member of the European Internet Forum, the European Parliament Intergroup on Disability and the MEPs Against Cancer group.

== Controversies ==
She has been embroiled in several feuds with other MEPs in the European Parliament, particularly during discussions concerning the quality of democracy, rule of law and the wiretapping scandal in Greece, which she vehemently denies ever occurred. On several occasions, she engaged in altercations with Sophie in 't Veld, a Dutch MEP. Asimakopoulou has criticized in 't Veld multiple times, accusing her of being "anti-Greek" and of "contradicting the will of the Greek people". According to her statements, Prime Minister Mitsotakis secured 41% of the electorate in the 2023 election, which, according to her, is a fact that suggests Greek people are unconcerned about the state of the rule of law.

=== GDPR breach scandal ===
On March 1, 2024, she was accused of a substantial GDPR breach involving thousands of email addresses, following revelations that she utilized the Ministry of the Interior's database to identify and target eligible Greek voters residing abroad. In response, she dismissed the allegations as "conspiracy theories", asserting that they are primarily aimed at "harming" the postal vote reform of the Greek government. On March 3, 2024, following her earlier response, she acknowledged that the contact details of the voters did, in fact, originate from her political party and not from the Ministry of the Interior.

Following the revelations and estimates indicating that thousands of addresses are being used without users' authorization, the Athens prosecutor’s office launched an investigation into the leak. Additionally, Greece’s Data Protection Authority (DPA) initiated an investigation into the allegations.

On March 15, 2024, she announced that she would no longer be running as an MEP in 2024. Her party, New Democracy, provided her with the opportunity to step down in light of the email leak. It was later revealed that the email lists were indeed leaked by the Ministry of the Interior, with General Secretary Michalis Stavrianoudakis and New Democracy’s Secretary for Diaspora Affairs, Nikos Theodoropoulos, being named as responsible for delivering her the contentious data file. The former announced his resignation, while the latter was ousted on the same day. In an email sent to all affected parties, she later acknowledged that the communicatio was lawful, as based on her legitimate interest to inform them about the Greek government’s reform of postal vote from their place of residence. She also informed the data file originated from Nikos Theodoropoulos but sidestepped taking any responsibility or issuing an apology for the GDPR breach which was under judicial investigation. Following an administrative hearing conducted on April 29, 2024, it was proved that she had received the data from New Democracy party sources and has used them without mentioning the data sources, an omission that she subsequently rectified by providing data subjects with all necessary information. In May 2024, she was ordered to destroy the voters’ data, that she immediately did as per the ISO 27001 safe destruction standards, and pay a fine of €40,000 for this formal violation, that she will challenge before the Greek Council of State as unfounded and disproportionate, based on her constitutional freedom of expression right to communicate with the voters, enshrined in Greek and international Conventions. The Greek state (Ministry of Interior) was fined €400,000 for lack of appropriate technical and organizational measures while the DPA refrained from issuing a ruling against the New Democracy party, and its former secretary due to new evidence about their role subject to further investigation.

=== Nikos Georgiadis case ===
In 2019, former New Democracy MP Nikos Georgiadis was sentenced to 28 months with suspension for sexual assault against minors, with Asimakopoulou testifying as a defense witness. In a majority decision, Georgiadis was found guilty of systematic and continuous sexual assault against minors over the age of 15 for remuneration in Moldova. Additionally, the Court imposed a fine of €20,000. Her involvement in the case garnered negative attention in the Greek media.

== Other activities ==
- Friends of Europe, Member of the Board of Trustees (since 2020)
