= Ilias Panagiotaros =

Greek politician (born 1973)

Ilias Panagiotaros (Greek: Ηλίας Παναγιώταρος; born 1973) is a Greek politician. A former member of the Hellenic Parliament for Golden Dawn, he was later tried and convicted of belonging to a criminal organization. In September 2013, Panagiotaros was arrested along with four other Golden Dawn MPs as part of a police investigation of the murder of Pavlos Fyssas, which Golden Dawn was accused of being involved in. Panagiotaros was charged in court and stood accused of being a member of a criminal organization. In 2020, he was found guilty and sentenced to 13 years in prison.

In April 2014, Panagiotaros described Hitler as a "great personality, like Stalin" and denounced homosexuality as a "sickness." Panagiotaros also described most Muslim immigrants to Greece as "Jihadists" and "fanatic Muslims" and claimed that he supported the concept of a one-race nation, stating, "if you are talking about nation, it is one race."
