= Eleni Zaroulia =

Greek politician (born 1961)

Eleni Zaroulia (Greek: Ελένη Ζαρούλια; born 21 May 1961) is a Greek ultranationalist activist and former politician of the Golden Dawn. She was first elected to parliament during the June 2012 Greek legislative election. Zaroulia was among those convicted in a mass trial of Golden Dawn politicians. She received a suspended sentence.

== Political involvements ==
On 1 October 2012, Zaroulia joined the Committee on Equality and Non-Discrimination of the Parliamentary Assembly of the Council of Europe. The Anti-Defamation League described this as "an affront to concepts of equality and non-discrimination".

== Personal life ==
Zaroulia is married to Golden Dawn leader Nikolaos Michaloliakos. Their daughter Ourania was one of six people arrested during a motorcycle attack against immigrants; all six were later released.
