= Aichan Kara Giousouf =

Greek politician

Aichan Kara Giousouf (Greek: Αϊχάν Καρά Γιουσούφ, Turkish: Ayhan Kara Yusuf, born on 12 August 1963 in Amaranta, Komotini, Greece) is a Greek politician from the muslim minority of Greece.

Born in a peasants family, he graduated in 1988 at the faculty of dentistry of the University of Istanbul, then worked for two years in Germany before coming back in Greece for the military service. In 1995, he served as secretary general of the Western Thrace Minority University Graduates Association, and between 1996 and 1999 as member of the board of the Dentists Association of Rhodope.

He became a member of Coalition of the Radical Left (SYRIZA) in 1994, and entered the Maroneia-Sapes municipal council. He was elected to the Greek Parliament for SYRIZA in the May 2012 Greek legislative election. He is atheist and in 2015 took the civilian oath as new member of the Greek Parliament.
