= List of members of the Hellenic Parliament, 2012–2014 =

This is a list of the 300 members who were elected to the Hellenic Parliament in the June 2012 Greek legislative election.

== Composition ==
Party		Initial (June 2012)	Final (Dec 2014)
•	New Democracy (ND)	129	127
	Coalition of the Radical Left (SYRIZA)	71	71
•	Panhellenic Socialist Movement (PASOK)	33	28
	Independent Greeks (ANEL)	20	12
	Golden Dawn (XA)	18	16
	Democratic Left (DIMAR)	17	9
	Communist Party of Greece (KKE)	12	12
	Independent Democratic MPs (ADIV)		17
	Independents		8
Total		300	300

== Members of Parliament ==
Changes table below records all changes in party affiliation.

Full Name	Constituency	Parliamentary Group
Irini-Eleni Agathopoulou	Kilkis	Syriza
Christos Aidonis	Drama	PASOK
Apostolos Alexopoulos	Athens B	Syriza
Chrysovalantis Alexopoulos	Larissa	Golden Dawn
Ioannis Amanatidis	Thessaloniki A	Syriza
Evangelia Ammanatidou-(Paschalidou) (Litsa)	Thessaloniki B	Syriza
Dimitrios Anagnostakis	Euboea	Democratic Left
Savvas Anastasiadis	Thessaloniki B	New Democracy
Ioannis Andrianos	Argolis	New Democracy
Dimitrios Androulakis (Mimis)	Athens B	PASOK
Maria Antoniou	Kastoria	New Democracy
Evangelos Apostolou	Euboea	Syriza
Fotini Arambatzi	Serres	New Democracy
Michail Arvanitis-Avramis	Achaea	Golden Dawn
Konstantinos Arvanitopoulos	Piraeus A	New Democracy
Anna-Misel Asimakopoulou	Ioannina	New Democracy
Charalambos Athanasiou	State list	New Democracy
Athanasios Athanasiou	Attica	Syriza
Eleftherios Avgenakis (Lefteris)	Heraklion	New Democracy
Dionysia-Theodora Avgerinopoulou	Elis	New Democracy
Gavriil Avramidis	Thessaloniki A	Independent Greeks
Dimitris Avramopoulos (replaced by Thanos Plevris on 3 November 2014)	Athens A	New Democracy
Dora Bakoyanni	State list	New Democracy
Konstantinos Barbarousis	Aetolia-Acarnania	Golden Dawn
Kostas Barkas	Preveza	Syriza
Evangelos Basiakos	Boeotia	New Democracy
Georgia Batsara	Imathia	New Democracy
Antonios Bezas	Thesprotia	New Democracy
Maria Bolari	Athens A	Syriza
Markos Bolaris	Serres	PASOK
Efstathios Boukouras	Corinthia	Golden Dawn
Athanasios Bouras	Attica	New Democracy
Pavlos Haikalis	Attica	Independent Greeks
Spyridon Chalvatzis	Athens B	KKE
Maximos Charakopoulos	Larissa	New Democracy
Despina Charalambidou	Thessaloniki A	Syriza
Konstantinos Chatzidakis (Kostis)	Athens B	New Democracy
Vassilios Chatzilambrou	Achaea	Syriza
Paraskevi Christofilopoulou (Evi)	Attica	PASOK
Dimitrios Christogiannis	Pieria	New Democracy
Michalis Chrisochoidis	Athens B	PASOK
Marina Chrysoveloni	Magnesia	Independent Greeks
Athanasios Davakis	Laconia	New Democracy
Athanasios Davlouros	Achaea	New Democracy
Georgios Davris	Achaea	Independent Greeks
Nikos Dendias	Corfu	New Democracy
Alexandros Dermedzopoulos	Evros	New Democracy
Kostis Dermitzakis	Lasithi	Syriza
Maria Diakaki	Heraklion	Syriza
Evangelos Diamantopoulos	Kastoria	Syriza
Ioannis Dimaras (Giannis)	Athens B	Independent Greeks
Christos Dimas	Corinthia	New Democracy
Pyrros Dimas	State list	PASOK
Argyris Dinopoulos	Athens B	New Democracy
Iro Dioti	Larissa	Syriza
Giorgos Dolios	Evros	PASOK
Rena Dourou (replaced by Eleni Avlonitou on 18 March 2014)	Athens B	Syriza
Ioannis Dragasakis	Athens B	Syriza
Theodoros Dritsas	Piraeus A	Syriza
Panagiota Dritseli	Trikala	Syriza
Giannis Drivelegas	Chalkidiki	PASOK
Theano Fotiou	State list	Syriza
Niki Founda	Aetolia-Acarnania	Democratic Left
Ioanna Gaitani	Thessaloniki A	Syriza
Dimitris Gakis	Dodecanese	Syriza
Dimitris Gelalis	Larissa	Syriza
Georgios Georgandas	Kilkis	New Democracy
Spyridon-Adonis Georgiadis (Adonis)	Athens B	New Democracy
Efstathia Georgopoulou-Saltari (Efi)	Elis	Syriza
Eleni Gerasimidou	Thessaloniki B	KKE
Angela Gerekou	Corfu	PASOK
Thanasis Germanidis	Florina	Syriza
Georgios Germenis	Athens B	Golden Dawn
Kyriakos Gerontopoulos	Evros	New Democracy
Olga Gerovassili	Arta	Syriza
Gerasimos Giakoumatos	Athens B	New Democracy
Maria Giannakaki	Piraeus B	Democratic Left
Chrysoula-Maria Giatagana	Thessaloniki A	Independent Greeks
Ioannis Giokas	Attica	KKE
Konstantinos Gioulekas	Thessaloniki A	New Democracy
Konstantinos Giovanopoulos	Imathia	Independent Greeks
Emmanouil Glezos (Manolis) (replaced by Mania Papadimitriou on 5 May 2014)	State list	Syriza
Christos Gokas	Arta	PASOK
Antonios Gregos	Thessaloniki A	Golden Dawn
Leonidas Grigorakos	Laconia	PASOK
Achmet Chatziosman	Rhodope	PASOK
Tsambika Iatridi (Mika)	Dodecanese	Independent Greeks
Vassilios Ikonomou	Attica	Democratic Left
Panagiotis Iliopoulos	Magnesia	Golden Dawn
Ekaterini Inglezi	Chalkidiki	Syriza
Ioannis Ioannidis	Thessaloniki A	New Democracy
Haroula Kafandari	Athens B	Syriza
Nikitas Kaklamanis	Athens A	New Democracy
Apostolos Kaklamanis	Athens B	PASOK
Stavros Kalafatis	Thessaloniki A	New Democracy
Georgios Kalandzis	Kavala	New Democracy
Agnes Kalogeri	Samos	Syriza
Stavros Kalogiannis	Ioannina	New Democracy
Panos Kammenos	Athens B	Independent Greeks
Garyfallia Kanelli (Liana)	Athens A	KKE
Maria Kanellopoulou	Achaea	Syriza
Vassilios Kapernaros	Athens B	Independent Greeks
Christos Karagiannidis	Drama	Syriza
Konstantinos Karagounis	Aetolia-Acarnania	New Democracy
Anna Karamanli	Athens B	New Democracy
Kostas Karamanlis	Thessaloniki A	New Democracy
Ioannis Karambelas	Boeotia	New Democracy
Efthymios Karanasios	Chalkidiki	New Democracy
Theodoros Karaoglou	Thessaloniki B	New Democracy
Georgios Karasmanis	Pella	New Democracy
Nikolaos Karathanasopoulos	Achaea	KKE
Aichan Kara Giousouf	Rhodope	Syriza
Georgios Kasapidis	Kozani	New Democracy
Ilias Kasidiaris	Attica	Golden Dawn
Michail Kassis	Ioannina	PASOK
Vasiliki Katrivanou	Athens B	Syriza
Konstantinos Katsafados	Piraeus A	New Democracy
Christos Katsotis	Athens B	KKE
Simos Kedikoglou	Euboea	New Democracy
Symeon Kedikoglou	Euboea	PASOK
Olga Kefalogianni	Athens A	New Democracy
Ioannis A. Kefalogiannis	Rethymno	New Democracy
Manolis Kefalogiannis (replaced by Giorgos Diktakis on 5 May 2014)	Heraklion	New Democracy
Vassilios Kegeroglou	Heraklion	PASOK
Christos Kellas	Larissa	New Democracy
Vassilis Kikilias	Athens A	New Democracy
Konstantinos Klitsiotis	Kavala	New Democracy
Dimitrios Kodelas	Argolis	Syriza
Maria Kollia-Tsaroucha	Serres	Independent Greeks
Kostas Kollias	Corinthia	New Democracy
Konstantinos Kondogeorgos	Evrytania	New Democracy
Georgios Kondogiannis	Elis	New Democracy
Stavros Kondonis	Zakynthos	Syriza
Alexandros Kondos	Xanthi	New Democracy
Emmanouil Konsolas	Dodecanese	New Democracy
Efstathios Konstantinidis (Stathis)	Florina	New Democracy
Theodosios Konstantinidis	Thessaloniki A	KKE
Odysseas Konstantinopoulos	Arcadia	PASOK
Georgios Konstantopoulos	Pieria	New Democracy
Zoi Konstantopoulou	Athens A	Syriza
Timoleon Kopsachilis	Grevena	New Democracy
Terens Kouik	State list	Independent Greeks
Konstantinos Koukodimos	Pieria	New Democracy
Paraskevas Koukoulopoulos (Paris)	Kozani	PASOK
Dimitrios Koukoutsis	Messenia	Golden Dawn
Elena Kountoura	Athens A	Independent Greeks
Tasos Kourakis	Thessaloniki A	Syriza
Ioannis Kourakos	Piraeus B	Independent Greeks
Panagiotis Kouroumplis	Athens B	Syriza
Kostas Koutsogiannakopoulos	Phthiotis	New Democracy
Giannis Koutsoukos	Elis	PASOK
Andreas Koutsoumbas	Boeotia	New Democracy
Fotios-Fanourios Kouvelis (Fotis)	Athens B	Democratic Left
Nikos Kouzilos	Piraeus A	Golden Dawn
Dimitrios Kremastinos	Dodecanese	PASOK
Michail Kritsotakis	Heraklion	Syriza
Vassilios Kyriakakis	Phthiotis	Syriza
Dimitrios Kyriazidis	Drama	New Democracy
Georgios Kyritsis	Trikala	Democratic Left
Panagiotis Lafazanis	Piraeus B	Syriza
Ioannis Lagos	Piraeus B	Golden Dawn
Ioannis Lambropoulos	Messenia	New Democracy
Georgios Lambroulis	Larissa	KKE
Chrysanthos Lazaridis	State list	New Democracy
Theofilos Leondaridis	Serres	New Democracy
Andreas Loverdos	Athens B	PASOK
Spyros Lykoudis	State list	Democratic Left
Andreas Lykouretzos	Arcadia	New Democracy
Rachil Makri	Kozani	Independent Greeks
Eleni Makri-Theodorou	Phthiotis	New Democracy
Christos Mandas	Ioannina	Syriza
Aspasia Mandreka	Phocis	New Democracy
Anna Mani-Papadimitriou	Pieria	New Democracy
Ioannis Maniatis	Argolida	PASOK
Diamanto Manolakou	Piraeus B	KKE
Epaminondas Marias (Notis) (replaced by Constantine Damavolitis on 5 May 2014)	Heraklion	Independent Greeks
Andreas Marinos	Elis	New Democracy
Christos Markogiannakis	Chania	New Democracy
Konstantinos Markopoulos	Euboea	Independent Greeks
Ekaterini Markou	Thessaloniki B	Democratic Left
Georgia Martinou	Attica	New Democracy
Alexandros Meikopoulos	Magnesia	Syriza
Vangelis Meimarakis	Athens B	New Democracy
Panagiotis Melas	Piraeus A	Independent Greeks
Nikolaos Michalakis	Karditsa	Syriza
Nikolaos Michaloliakos	Athens A	Golden Dawn
Ioannis Michelakis	State list	New Democracy
Ioannis Michelogiannakis	Heraklion	Democratic Left
Nikos Michos	Euboea	Golden Dawn
Notis Mitarachi (Notis)	Athens A	New Democracy
Alexios Mitropoulos	Attica	Syriza
Kyriakos Mitsotakis	Athens B	New Democracy
Athanasios Moraitis (Thanos)	Aetolia-Acarnania	PASOK
Nikolaos Moraitis	Aetolia-Acarnania	KKE
Konstantinos Mousouroulis (replaced by Stamatis Karmantzis on 5 May 2014, himself replaced by Maria Stavrinoudi-Soudi on 29 August 2014)	Chios	New Democracy
Parisis Moutsinas (Paris)	Magnesia	Democratic Left
Athanasios Nakos (replaced by Zetta Makri on 28 March 2013)	Magnesia	New Democracy
Anastasios Nerantzis	Piraeus B	New Democracy
Nikolaos Nikolopoulos	Achaea	New Democracy
Georgios Orfanos	Thessaloniki A	New Democracy
Marinos Ouzounidis	Evros	Independent Greeks
Evgenia Ouzounidou	Kozani	Syriza
Thanasis Pafilis	State list	KKE
Ilias Panagiotaros	Athens B	Golden Dawn
Nikolaos Panagiotopoulos	Kavala	New Democracy
Panos Panagiotopoulos	Athens B	New Democracy
Stathis Panagoulis	Athens B	Syriza
Georgios Pandzas	Attica	Syriza
Ioannis Panousis	Athens A	Democratic Left
Dimitrios Papadimoulis (replaced by Anna Hatzisofia on 5 May 2014)	Athens B	Syriza
Mihail Papadopoulos	Kozani	New Democracy
Ekaterini Papakosta-Sidiropoulou	Athens B	New Democracy
George Papandreou	Achaea	PASOK
Alexandra Papariga	Athens B	KKE
Christos Pappas	State list	Golden Dawn
Theodoros Parastatidis	Kilkis	PASOK
Ioannis Paschalidis	Kavala	New Democracy
Fevronia Patrianakou	Laconia	New Democracy
Prokopios Pavlopoulos	Athens A	New Democracy
Athanasios Petrakos	Messenia	Syriza
Fotini Pipili	Athens A	New Democracy
Ioannis Plakiotakis	Lasithi	New Democracy
Vyron Polydoras	Athens B	New Democracy
Grigoris Psarianos	Athens B	Democratic Left
Andreas Psycharis (replaced by Alexandros Moraitakis on 14 November 2014)	Athens A	New Democracy
Thomas Psyrras	Larissa	Democratic Left
Elena Rapti	Thessaloniki A	New Democracy
Maria Repousi	Piraeus A	Democratic Left
Panagiotis Rigas	Cyclades	PASOK
Dimitris Sabaziotis	Messenia	New Democracy
Filippos Sachinidis	Larissa	PASOK
Sofia Sakorafa (replaced by Fotini Kouvela on 5 May 2014)	Athens B	Syriza
Marios Salmas	Aetolia-Acarnania	New Democracy
Dimitrios Saltouros	Xanthi	PASOK
Antonios Samaras	Messenia	New Democracy
Stefanos Samoilis	Corfu	Syriza
Maximos Senetakis	Heraklion	New Democracy
Nikolaos Sifounakis	Lesbos	PASOK
Nikitas Siois (replaced by Artemios Matthaiopoulos on 23 July 2012)	Serres	Golden Dawn
Pavlos Sioufas (replaced by Giorgos Anagnostopoulos on 11 December 2013)	Karditsa	New Democracy
Konstantinos Skandalidis	Athens A	PASOK
Asimina Skondra	Karditsa	New Democracy
Konstantinos Skrekas	Trikala	New Democracy
Theodoros Soldatos	Lefkada	New Democracy
Aristovoulos Spiliotopoulos (Aris) (replaced by Panagiota Iakovidou (Tania) on 27 March 2014, after that Yannis Papathanasiou declines)	Athens B	New Democracy
Christos Staikouras	Phthiotis	New Democracy
Afroditi Stambouli	Serres	Syriza
Dionysios Stamenitis	Pella	New Democracy
Giorgos Stathakis	Chania	Syriza
Ioannis Stathas	Boeotia	Syriza
Nikolaos Stavrogiannis (Nikos) (replaced by Dimitris Brianis on 7 October 2014)	Phthiotis	New Democracy
Dimitrios Stratoulis	Athens B	Syriza
Evripidis Stylianidis	Rhodope	New Democracy
Georgios Stylios	Arta	New Democracy
Nikolaos Syrmalenios	Cyclades	Syriza
Nikolaos Tagaras	Corinthia	New Democracy
Spyridon Taliadouros	Karditsa	New Democracy
Michalis Tamilos	Trikala	New Democracy
Konstantinos Tasoulas	Ioannina	New Democracy
Petros Tatsopoulos	Athens B	Syriza
Afroditi Theopeftatou	Kefalonia	Syriza
Ioannis Tragakis	Piraeus B	New Democracy
Konstantinos Triandafyllos	Chios	PASOK
Maria Triandafyllou	Aetolia-Acarnania	Syriza
Efklidis Tsakalotos	Athens B	Syriza
Lazaros Tsavdaridis	Imathia	New Democracy
Konstantinos Tsiaras	Karditsa	New Democracy
Alexios Tsipras	Athens A	Syriza
Dimitris Tsoukalas	State list	Syriza
Nikolaos Tsoukalis	Achaea	Democratic Left
Dimitrios Tsoumanis	Preveza	New Democracy
Theodora Tzakri	Pella	PASOK
Iordanis Tzamtzis	Pella	New Democracy
Kostas Tzavaras	Elis	New Democracy
Nadia Valavani	Athens B	Syriza
Evgenia Vamvaka (Tzeni)	Piraeus B	Syriza
Georgios Varemenos	Aetolia-Acarnania	Syriza
Miltiadis Varvitsiotis	Athens B	New Democracy
Evangelos Venizelos	Thessaloniki A	PASOK
Apostolos Vesyropoulos	Imathia	New Democracy
Kyriakos Virvidakis	Chania	New Democracy
Georgios Vlachos	Attica	New Democracy
Menelaos Vlachveis	Serres	New Democracy
Ilias Vlahogiannis	Trikala	New Democracy
Pavlos Vogiatzis	Lesbos	New Democracy
Manousos-Konstantinos Voloudakis	Chania	New Democracy
Mavroudis Voridis (Makis)	Attica	New Democracy
Odyssefs-Nikos Voudouris	Athens B	Democratic Left
Sofia Voultepsi	Athens B	New Democracy
Nikolaos Voutsis	Athens A	Syriza
Ioannis Vroutsis	Cyclades	New Democracy
Andreas Xanthos	Rethymno	Syriza
Asimina Xirotyri-Ekaterinari	Thessaloniki A	Democratic Left
Stavroula Xoulidou	Thessaloniki B	Independent Greeks
Vassilios-Nikolaos Ypsilantis	Dodecanese	New Democracy
Konstantinos Zacharias	Arcadia	Syriza
Eleni Zaroulia	Athens B	Golden Dawn
Chousein Zeimpek	Xanthi	Syriza
Ioannis Zerdelis	Lesbos	Syriza
Polyvios Zisimopoulos	Thessaloniki B	Golden Dawn

== Changes ==
- 23 July 2012: Artemios Matthaiopoulos replaces Nikitas Siois (Golden Dawn) who resigned on 23 July.
- 3 August 2012: Nikos Nikolopoulos is expelled from New Democracy (ND) and later founds the Christian Democratic Party.
- 21 October 2012: Nikos Stavrogiannis is expelled from New Democracy.
- 22 October 2012: Ioannis Michelogiannakis (DIMAR) declares himself an independent.
- 25 October 2012: Ioannis Michelogiannakis announces his collaboration with SYRIZA.
- 7 November 2012: Georgios Kasapidis is expelled from the New Democracy group and Kostas Skandalidis, Angela Gerekou, Markos Bolaris, Giannis Koutsoukos, Michalis Kassis and Theodoros Parastatidis are expelled from the PASOK group.
- 8 November 2012: Mimis Androulakis (PASOK) declares himself an independent.
- 12 November 2012: Theodoros Soldatos is expelled from the New Democracy group.
- 3 December 2012: Andreas Loverdos is expelled from PASOK after founding RIKSSY.
- 13 December 2012: Ioannis Kourakos and Konstantinos Markopoulos (ANEL) declare themselves independents.
- 7 January 2013: Odysseas Voudouris and Paris Moutsinas are expelled from DIMAR.
- 10 January 2013: Christos Aidonis (PASOK) declares himself an independent.
- 20 February 2013: Kostas Skandalidis, Angela Gerekou, Giannis Koutsoukos and Michalis Kassis return to the PASOK group.
- 21 March 2013: Nikolaos Stavrogiannis and Ioannis Kourakos form Nea MERA.
- 28 March 2013: Zetta Makri replaces Athanasios Nakos who died on 28 March (New Democracy).
- 15 April 2013: Andreas Loverdos and Christos Aidonis form the Agreement for the New Greece.
- 24 April 2013: Odysseas Voudouris, Paris Moutsinas and Theodoros Parastatidis form Society First.
- 1 July 2013: Theodoros Soldatos and Kostas Markopoulos return to New Democracy (the latter had been an ND minister and MP before joining ANEL).
- 4 July 2013: Ioannis Michelogiannakis joins the SYRIZA group.
- 11 November 2013: Theodora Tzakri is expelled from the PASOK group for supporting a motion of no confidence submitted by SYRIZA.
- 21 November 2013: 11 independent MPs of differing political views and party origins—Theodoros Parastatidis, Andreas Loverdos, Christos Aidonis, Mimis Androulakis, Markos Bolaris (former PASOK), Odysseas Voudouris, Paris Moutsinas (former DIMAR), Nikos Nikolopoulos, Georgios Kasapidis, Nikos Stavrogiannis (former ND) and Ioannis Kourakos (former ANEL)—decide to form a new parliamentary group, in order to enjoy the full benefits provided by the standing orders to groups of 10 or more MPs. The members of the new group, which takes the name Independent Democratic MPs (Greek: Ανεξάρτητοι Δημοκρατικοί Βουλευτές), agree to make use of those benefits on a rotational basis. Theodoros Parastatidis is named the group's first rotating chairman.
- 11 December 2013: Georgios Anagnostopoulos replaces Pavlos Sioufas (ND, Karditsa), who resigned on the same day.
- 21 December 2013: Vyron Polydoras (ND), a former Speaker, declares himself an independent. He later founds the Union for the Homeland and the People.
- 10 January 2014: Petros Tatsopoulos (SYRIZA) declares himself an independent.
- 13 January 2014: Georgios Davris is expelled from the Independent Greeks group.
- 23 January 2014: Georgios Davris joins the Independent Democratic MPs.
- 27 January 2014: Petros Tatsopoulos joins the Independent Democratic MPs.
- 15 March 2014: Chrysovalantis Alexopoulos (Golden Dawn) declares himself an independent.
- 18 March 2014: Jailed MP Efstathios Boukouras is expelled from Golden Dawn. The same day, Rena Dourou (Syriza) resigns from Parliament in order to focus on her campaign for the presidency of Attica region. She is replaced by the next on the Athens B list, former Olympic swimmer Eleni Avlonitou.
- 26 March 2014: Chrysoula Giatagana and Konstantinos Giovanopoulos (ANEL) declare themselves independents.
- 27 March 2014: Aris Spiliotopoulos (Athens B, ND) resigns from Parliament to focus on his campaign for the presidency of Attica region. Next on the list, Yannis Papathanasiou however declines after becoming Chairman of Hellenic Petroleum the month before. Panagiota Iakovidou (Tania) therefore takes Spiliotopoulos's seat.
- 31 March 2014: Former Athens mayor, Nikitas Kaklamanis, is expelled from the New Democracy group.
- 3 April 2014: Theodora Tzakri joins the Independent Democratic MPs.
- 2 May 2014: six MPs resign before standing for the European Parliament election on 25 May: Konstantinos Mousouroulis & Manolis Kefalogiannis (ND), Sofia Sakorafa, Dimitris Papadimoulis & Manolis Glezos (Syriza) and Notis Marias (ANEL). They are replaced on 5 May by, respectively: Stamatis Karmantzis & Giorgos Diktakis (ND), Fotini Kouvela, Anna Hatzisofia & Mania Papadimitriou (Syriza) and Constantine Damavolitis (ANEL).
- 9 May 2014: Chrysoula Giatagana and Konstantinos Giovanopoulos join the Independent Democratic MPs.
- 29 May 2014: Vasilis Kapernaros (ANEL) declares himself an independent.
- 3 June 2014: Mika Iatridi (ANEL) declares herself an independent.
- 6 June 2014: Vasilis Oikonomou (DIMAR) declares himself an independent.
- 19 June 2014: Vasilis Kapernaros joins the Independent Democratic MPs.
- 10 July 2014: Katerina Markou (DIMAR) declares herself an independent, and Grigoris Psarianos is expelled from the DIMAR group.
- 22 August 2014: Andreas Loverdos returns to the PASOK group.
- 27 August 2014: Nikos Stavrogiannis submits his resignation after being elected mayor of Lamia in the May election. His seat is taken over by New Democracy's Dimitris Brianis.
- 29 August 2014: Stamatis Karmantzis (ND) resigns to take the position of Vice-President of the North Aegean region (Αντιπεριφερειάρχης) for Chios. His seat is taken by Maria Stavrinoudi-Soudi.
- 9 September 2014 Spyros Lykoudis (DIMAR) declares himself an independent.
- 7 October 2014: Nikos Nikolopoulos joins, and Rachil Makri is expelled from, the Independent Greeks group.
- 9 October 2014: Nikitas Kaklamanis returns to the New Democracy group.
- 16 October 2014: Rachil Makri and Mika Iatridi join the Independent Democratic MPs.
- 3 November 2014: Dimitris Avramopoulos (ND) resigns as Minister for Defence and member of parliament after taking on the Migration, Home Affairs and Citizenship portfolio in the new Juncker Commission. His seat is taken over by Thanos Plevris.
- 14 November 2014: Andreas Psycharis (ND) resigns. His seat is taken by Alexandros Moraitakis.
- 1 December 2014: Panagiotis Melas (ANEL) declares himself an independent.
- 3 December 2014: Panagiotis Melas joins the Independent Democratic MPs.
- 23 December 2014: Niki Founta (DIMAR) declares herself an independent.

== Sources ==
- Hellenic Parliament website
