= List of members of the Hellenic Parliament, May 2012 =

Seats won in the new parliament New Democracy (ND): 108 seats Coalition of the Radical Left (Syriza): 52 seats Panhellenic Socialist Movement (PASOK): 41 seats Independent Greeks: 33 seats Communist Party (KKE): 26 seats Golden Dawn: 21 seats Democratic Left (DIMAR): 19 seats

Below is the list of the 300 members of the Hellenic Parliament following the May 2012 Greek legislative election. This Parliament lasted only two days, convening for the first time on 17 May 2012, and electing the Speaker on 18 May 2012. On 19 May 2012 the President proclaimed new elections thus ending the parliamentary term.

== Members of Parliament ==
Full Name	Constituency	Parliamentary Group
Irini-Eleni Agathopoulou	Kilkis	Syriza
Christos Aidonis	Drama	PASOK
Chrysovalandis Alexopoulos	Larissa	Golden Dawn
Ioannis Amanatidis	Thessaloniki A	Syriza
Evangelia Ammanatidou-Paschalidou (Litsa)	Thessaloniki B	Syriza
Dimitrios Anagnostakis	Euboea	Democratic Left
Ioannis Andrianos	Argolis	New Democracy
Dimitrios Androulakis (Mimis)	Athens B	PASOK
Maria Antoniou	Kastoria	New Democracy
Evangelos Apostolou	Euboea	Syriza
Stavros Arachovitis	Laconia	Syriza
Fotini Arambatzi	Serres	New Democracy
Evgenia Arvaniti-Prevezanou	Attica	Independent Greeks
Michail Arvanitis-Avramis	Achaea	Golden Dawn
Konstantinos Arvanitopoulos	Piraeus A	New Democracy
Charalambos Athanasiou	State list	New Democracy
Athanasios Athanasiou (Nasos)	Attica	Syriza
Dionysia-Theodora Avgerinopoulou	Elis	New Democracy
Gavriil Avramidis	Thessaloniki A	Independent Greeks
Dimitris Avramopoulos	Athens A	New Democracy
Konstantinos Barbarousis	Aetolia-Acarnania	Golden Dawn
Evangelos Basiakos	Boeotia	New Democracy
Antonios Bezas	Thesprotia	New Democracy
Markos Bolaris	Serres	PASOK
Efstathios Boukaras	Corinthia	Golden Dawn
Athanasios Bouras	Attica	New Democracy
Evangelos Boutas	Karditsa	KKE
Pavlos Haikalis	Attica	Independent Greeks
Spyridon Chalvatzis	Athens B	KKE
Maximos Charakopoulos	Larissa	New Democracy
Despina Charalambidou	Thessaloniki A	Syriza
Charalambos Charalambous (Babis)	Corfu	KKE
Konstantinos Chatzidakis (Kostis)	Athens B	New Democracy
Vassilios Chatzilambrou	Achaea	Syriza
Theodoros Chimaras	Phthiotis	Independent Greeks
Paraskevi Christofilopoulou (Evi)	Attica	PASOK
Dimitrios Christogiannis	Pieria	New Democracy
Michalis Chrisochoidis	Athens B	PASOK
Marina Chrysoveloni	Magnesia	Independent Greeks
Athanasios Davakis	Laconia	New Democracy
Athanasios Davlouros	Achaea	New Democracy
Georgios Davris	Achaea	Independent Greeks
Georgios Diktakis	Heraklion	New Democracy
Nikos Dendias	Corfu	New Democracy
Alexandros Dermedzopoulos	Evros	New Democracy
Ioannis Dimaras (Giannis)	Athens B	Independent Greeks
Christos Dimas	Corinthia	New Democracy
Pyrros Dimas	State list	PASOK
Argyris Dinopoulos	Athens B	New Democracy
Iro Dioti	Larissa	Syriza
Giorgos Dolios	Evros	PASOK
Rena Dourou	Athens B	Syriza
Ioannis Dragasakis	Athens B	Syriza
Theodoros Dritsas	Piraeus A	Syriza
Giannis Drivelegas	Chalkidiki	PASOK
Dimitrios Emmanouilidis	Kavala	Syriza
Nikolaos Exarchos (Pakos)	Ioannina	KKE
Theano Fotiou	State list	Syriza
Evangelos Fotiou	Serres	Democratic Left
Niki Founda	Aetolia-Acarnania	Democratic Left
Dionysios Gasparos	Zakynthos	New Democracy
Fotini Genimata	State list	PASOK
Georgios Georgandas	Kilkis	New Democracy
Spyridon-Adonis Georgiadis (Adonis)	Athens B	New Democracy
Efstathia Georgopoulou-Saltari (Efi)	Elis	Syriza
Eleni Gerasimidou	Thessaloniki B	KKE
Georgios Germenis	Athens B	Golden Dawn
Kyriakos Gerontopoulos	Evros	New Democracy
Olga Gerovassili	Arta	Syriza
Gerasimos Giakoumatos	Athens B	New Democracy
Maria Giannakaki	Piraeus B	Democratic Left
Michalis Giannakis	State list	Independent Greeks
Konstantina Giannakopoulou (Nadia)	Messenia	PASOK
Chrysoula-Maria Giatagana	Thessaloniki A	Independent Greeks
Ioannis Giokas	Attica	KKE
Konstantinos Gioulekas	Thessaloniki A	New Democracy
Konstantinos Giovanopoulos	Imathia	Independent Greeks
Apostolos Gletsos	Phthiotis	Golden Dawn
Emmanouil Glezos (Manolis)	State list	Syriza
Christos Gokas	Arta	PASOK
Athanasios Grammatikopoulos	Pella	Independent Greeks
Antonios Gregos	Thessaloniki A	Golden Dawn
Leonidas Grigorakos	Laconia	PASOK
Konstantinos Gyparis	Chania	New Democracy
Achmet Chatziosman	Rhodope	PASOK
Tsambika Iatridi (Mika)	Dodecanese	Independent Greeks
Georgios Ikonomou	Trikala	PASOK
Vassilios Ikonomou	Attica	Democratic Left
Panagiotis Iliopoulos	Magnesia	Golden Dawn
Ekaterini Inglezi	Chalkidiki	Syriza
Ioannis Ioannidis	Thessaloniki A	New Democracy
Vassilios Ioannou	Preveza	PASOK
Nikitas Kaklamanis	Athens A	New Democracy
Apostolos Kaklamanis	Athens B	PASOK
Stavros Kalafatis	Thessaloniki A	New Democracy
Georgios Kalandzis	Kavala	New Democracy
Stavros Kalogiannis	Ioannina	New Democracy
Panos Kammenos	Athens B	Independent Greeks
Achilleas Kandartzis	Trikala	KKE
Garyfallia Kanelli (Liana)	Athens A	KKE
Maria Kanellopoulou	Achaea	Syriza
Vassilios Kapernaros	Athens B	Independent Greeks
Aichan Kara Giousouf	Rhodope	Syriza
Dimitrios Karagiannis	Lesbos	KKE
Konstantinos Karagounis	Aetolia-Acarnania	New Democracy
Anna Karamanli	Athens B	New Democracy
Kostas Karamanlis	Thessaloniki A	New Democracy
Ioannis Karambelas	Boeotia	New Democracy
Efthymios Karanasios	Chalkidiki	New Democracy
Xanthippi Karanika	Imathia	Syriza
Theodoros Karaoglou	Thessaloniki B	New Democracy
Georgios Karasmanis	Pella	New Democracy
Nikolaos Karathanasopoulos	Achaea	KKE
Michail Karchimakis	Lasithi	PASOK
Georgios Kasapidis	Kozani	New Democracy
Ilias Kasidiaris	Attica	Golden Dawn
Michail Kassis	Ioannina	PASOK
Christos Katsotis	Athens B	KKE
Symeon Kedikoglou	Euboea	PASOK
Olga Kefalogianni	Athens A	New Democracy
Manolis Kefalogiannis	Heraklion	New Democracy
Vassilios Kegeroglou	Heraklion	PASOK
Christos Kellas	Larissa	New Democracy
Vassilis Kikilias	Athens A	New Democracy
Dimitrios Kodelas	Argolis	Syriza
Maria Kollia-Tsaroucha	Serres	Independent Greeks
Konstantinos Kondogeorgos	Evrytania	New Democracy
Pavlos Kondogiannidis	Athens B	Independent Greeks
Alexandros Kondos	Xanthi	New Democracy
Emmanouil Konsolas	Dodecanese	New Democracy
Efstathios Konstantinidis (Stathis)	Florina	New Democracy
Theodosios Konstantinidis	Thessaloniki A	KKE
Odysseas Konstantinopoulos	Arcadia	PASOK
Georgios Konstantopoulos	Pieria	New Democracy
Ioannis Konstantopoulos (Ioannis)	Elis	Independent Greeks
Zoi Konstantopoulou	Athens A	Syriza
Timoleon Kopsachilis	Grevena	New Democracy
Terens Kouik	State list	Independent Greeks
Konstantinos Koukodimos	Pieria	New Democracy
Paraskevas Koukoulopoulos (Paris)	Kozani	PASOK
Dimitrios Koukoutsis	Messenia	Golden Dawn
Symeon Koumbanis	Kastoria	Independent Greeks
Elena Kountoura	Athens A	Independent Greeks
Tasos Kourakis	Thessaloniki A	Syriza
Ioannis Kourakos	Piraeus B	Independent Greeks
Panagiotis Kouroumplis	Athens B	Syriza
Giannis Koutsoukos	Elis	PASOK
Andreas Koutsoumbas	Boeotia	New Democracy
Fotios-Fanourios Kouvelis (Fotis)	Athens B	Democratic Left
Nikos Kouzilos	Piraeus A	Golden Dawn
Dimitrios Kremastinos	Dodecanese	PASOK
Nikolaos Krespis	Elis	Golden Dawn
Michail Kritsotakis	Heraklion	Syriza
Lina Krokidi	Athens B	KKE
Vassilios Kyriakakis	Phthiotis	Syriza
Dimitrios Kyriazidis	Drama	New Democracy
Georgios Kyritsis	Trikala	Democratic Left
Panagiotis Lafazanis	Piraeus B	Syriza
Ioannis Lagos	Piraeus B	Golden Dawn
Yannis Lambropoulos	Messenia	New Democracy
Georgios Lambroulis	Larissa	KKE
Chrysanthos Lazaridis	State list	New Democracy
Theofilos Leondaridis	Serres	New Democracy
Dimitrios Lindzeris	Piraeus B	PASOK
Andreas Loverdos	Athens B	PASOK
Spyros Lykoudis	State list	Democratic Left
Andreas Lykouretzos	Arcadia	New Democracy
Rachil Makri	Kozani	Independent Greeks
Christos Mandas	Ioannina	Syriza
Aspasia Mandreka	Phocis	New Democracy
Giannis Maniatis	Argolida	PASOK
Diamanto Manolakou	Piraeus B	KKE
Ioannis Manolis	Athens B	Independent Greeks
Epaminondas Marias (Notis)	Heraklion	Independent Greeks
Georgios Marinos	Euboea	KKE
Konstantinos Markopoulos	Euboea	Independent Greeks
Ekaterini Markou	Thessaloniki B	Democratic Left
Georgia Martinou	Attica	New Democracy
Dimitrios Mavratzotis	Samos	KKE
Vangelis Meimarakis	Athens B	New Democracy
Panagiotis Melas	Piraeus A	Independent Greeks
Nikolaos Michalakis	Karditsa	Syriza
Nikolaos Michaloliakos	Athens A	Golden Dawn
Ioannis Michelakis	State list	New Democracy
Ioannis Michelogiannakis	Heraklion	Democratic Left
Nikos Michos	Euboea	Golden Dawn
Notis Mitarachi	Athens A	New Democracy
Alexios Mitropoulos	Attica	Syriza
Kyriakos Mitsotakis	Athens B	New Democracy
Athanasios Moraitis (Thanos)	Aetolia-Acarnania	PASOK
Nikolaos Moraitis	Aetolia-Acarnania	KKE
Konstantinos Mousouroulis	Chios	New Democracy
Parisis Moutsinas (Paris)	Magnesia	Democratic Left
Athanasios Nakos	Magnesia	New Democracy
Apostolos Nanos	Magnesia	KKE
Nikolaos Nikolopoulos	Achaea	New Democracy
Georgios Orfanos	Thessaloniki A	New Democracy
Emmanouil Othonas	Rethymno	PASOK
Thanasis Pafilis	State list	KKE
Ilias Panagiotaros	Athens B	Golden Dawn
Panos Panagiotopoulos	Athens B	New Democracy
Nikolaos Panagiotopoulos	Kavala	New Democracy
Elpida Pandelaki	Piraeus A	KKE
Ioannis Panousis	Athens A	Democratic Left
Dimitrios Papadimoulis	Athens B	Syriza
Evgenios Papadopoulos	Pieria	Independent Greeks
Ekaterini Papakosta-Sidiropoulou	Athens B	New Democracy
George Papandreou	Achaea	PASOK
Alexandra Papariga	Athens B	KKE
Giannis Papathanasiou	Athens B	New Democracy
Ioannis Pappas	Dodecanese	New Democracy
Christos Pappas	State list	Golden Dawn
Theodoros Parastatidis	Kilkis	PASOK
Ioannis Paschalidis	Kavala	New Democracy
Prokopios Pavlopoulos	Athens A	New Democracy
Athanasios Petrakos	Messenia	Syriza
Fotini Pipili	Athens A	New Democracy
Ioannis Plakiotakis	Lasithi	New Democracy
Vyron Polydoras	Athens B	New Democracy
Grigoris Psarianos	Athens B	Democratic Left
Andreas Psycharis	Athens A	New Democracy
Thomas Psyrras	Larissa	Democratic Left
Elena Rapti	Thessaloniki A	New Democracy
Maria Repousi	Piraeus A	Democratic Left
Filippos Sachinidis	Larissa	PASOK
Sofia Sakorafa	Athens B	Syriza
Marios Salmas	Aetolia-Acarnania	New Democracy
Dimitrios Saltouros	Xanthi	PASOK
Antonios Samaras	Messenia	New Democracy
Nikolaos Samaras	Florina	PASOK
Stefanos Samoilis	Corfu	Syriza
Maximos Senetakis	Heraklion	New Democracy
Nikitas Siois	Serres	Golden Dawn
Konstantinos Skandalidis	Athens A	PASOK
Asimina Skondra	Karditsa	New Democracy
Konstantinos Skrekas	Trikala	New Democracy
Nikolaos Smoloktos	Drama	Independent Greeks
Theodoros Soldatos	Lefkada	New Democracy
Aristovoulos Spiliotopoulos (Aris)	Athens B	New Democracy
Christos Staikouras	Phthiotis	New Democracy
Dimitrios G. Stamatis	Aetolia-Acarnania	Independent Greeks
Konstantinos Stambolidis	Kozani	KKE
Dionysios Stamenitis	Pella	New Democracy
Giorgos Stathakis	Chania	Syriza
Ioannis Stathas	Boeotia	Syriza
Dimitrios Stratoulis	Athens B	Syriza
Evripidis Stylianidis	Rhodope	New Democracy
Georgios Stylios	Arta	New Democracy
Emmanouil Syndychakis	Heraklion	KKE
Nikolaos Syrmalenios	Cyclades	Syriza
Nikolaos Tagaras	Corinthia	New Democracy
Spyridon Taliadouros	Karditsa	New Democracy
Ioanna Tambaki-Sofronof	Imathia	KKE
Konstantinos Tasoulas	Ioannina	New Democracy
Petros-Georgios Tatsopoulos	Athens B	Syriza
Maria Theleriti	Corinthia	Syriza
Afroditi Theopeftatou	Kefalonia	Syriza
Angelos Tolkas	Imathia	PASOK
Ioannis Tragakis	Piraeus B	New Democracy
Konstantinos Triandafyllos	Chios	PASOK
Efklidis Tsakalotos	Athens B	Syriza
Konstantinos Tsiaras	Karditsa	New Democracy
Theodora Tsikardani	Kozani	Democratic Left
Theocharis Tsiokas (Charis)	Thessaloniki B	PASOK
Alexios Tsipras	Athens A	Syriza
Nikolaos Tsonis	Phthiotis	PASOK
Nikolaos Tsoukalis	Achaea	Democratic Left
Dimitrios Tsoumanis	Preveza	New Democracy
Theodora Tzakri	Pella	PASOK
Kostas Tzavaras	Elis	New Democracy
Olga-Nantia Valavani	Athens B	Syriza
Evgenia Vamvaka (Tzeni)	Piraeus B	Syriza
Georgios Varemenos	Aetolia-Acarnania	Syriza
Miltiadis Varvitsiotis	Athens B	New Democracy
Evangelos Venizelos	Thessaloniki A	PASOK
Kyriakos Virvidakis	Chania	New Democracy
Georgios Vlachos	Attica	New Democracy
Menelaos Vlachveis	Serres	New Democracy
Ilias Vlahogiannis	Trikala	New Democracy
Pavlos Vogiatzis	Lesbos	New Democracy
Manousos-Konstantinos Voloudakis	Chania	New Democracy
Mavroudis Voridis (Makis)	Attica	New Democracy
Odyssefs-Nikos Voudouris	Athens B	Democratic Left
Ioannis Vouldis	Athens A	Golden Dawn
Sofia Voultepsi	Athens B	New Democracy
Vassiliki-Rafaela Voulvoukeli	Athens B	Independent Greeks
Marios Voutsinos	Cyclades	Independent Greeks
Nikolaos Voutsis	Athens A	Syriza
Ioannis Vroutsis	Cyclades	New Democracy
Andreas Xanthos	Rethymno	Syriza
Asimina Xirotyri-Ekaterinari	Thessaloniki A	Democratic Left
Stavroula Xoulidou	Thessaloniki B	Independent Greeks
Vassilios-Nikolaos Ypsilantis	Dodecanese	New Democracy
Konstantinos Zacharias	Arcadia	Syriza
Eleni Zaroulia	Athens B	Golden Dawn
Chousein Zeimpek	Xanthi	Syriza
Ioannis Zerdelis	Lesbos	Syriza
Ioannis Ziogas	Thessaloniki A	KKE
Polyvios Zisimopoulos	Thessaloniki B	Golden Dawn
Christos Zois	Larissa	Independent Greeks

== Sources ==
- Hellenic Parliament website
