= Maria Kollia-Tsaroucha =

Greek politician

- Μαρία Κόλλια-Τσαρουχά
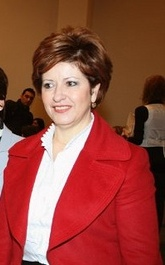
- Maria Kolla at a meeting of the Organizing Committee for "Deaflympics Athens 2013" at Zappeion, Athens, 7 July 2009.

Deputy Minister for National Defence
- In office 29 August 2018 – 18 January 2019
- Prime Minister: Alexis Tsipras
- Preceded by: vacant last held by Nikos Toskas
- Succeeded by: vacant next held by Alkiviadis Stefanis

Deputy Minister for Macedonia and Thrace
- In office 23 September 2015 – 29 August 2018
- Prime Minister: Alexis Tsipras
- Preceded by: Filippos Tsalidis
- Succeeded by: Katerina Notopoulou
- In office 27 January 2015 – 28 August 2015
- Prime Minister: Alexis Tsipras
- Preceded by: Georgios Orfanos (as Minister for Macedonia and Thrace)
- Succeeded by: Filippos Tsalidis

6th Deputy Speaker of the Hellenic Parliament

14th, 15th
- In office 18 May 2012 – 5 February 2015

Member of the Hellenic Parliament

10th, 11th, 12th, 13th, 14th, 15th, 16th, 17th
- In office 9 April 2000 – 7 July 2019
- Constituency: Serres

Personal details
- Born: 1958 (age 67–68) Serres, Macedonia, Greece
- Party: New Democracy (1983-2012); Independent Greeks (since 2012)
- Spouse: Christos Tsarouchas
- Education: Aristotle University of Thessaloniki

Maria Kollia Tsaroucha (Greek: Μαρία Κόλλια-Τσαρουχά) is a Greek politician from Serres. She was Deputy Minister for Macedonia and Thrace and later Deputy Minister for National Defence between 2015 and 2019 in the First and Second Cabinets of Alexis Tsipras. She was also a Member of Parliament with New Democracy and the Independent Greeks from 2000 to 2019, during which she was Deputy Speaker of the Hellenic Parliament from 2012 to 2015.

== Early life and education ==
Mrs. Kollia-Tsaroucha was born in Serres on 21 February 1958. She is a graduate of the law school of Aristotle University of Thessaloniki.

== Political career ==
From 1983 to 2012, Kollia-Tsaroucha was a member of the Women's section of New Democracy. She ended up as member of the central committee of New Democracy and the party's section responsible for Education and Religion.

In 2000, she was elected to the Hellenic Parliament for Serres Prefecture. In 2004, 2007, and 2009, she was reelected. During this time, she was President of the Special Standing Committee on Equality, Youth and Human Rights and of the Standing Committee on Educational Affairs. She was a member of the Standing Committees of Foreign Affairs and Defence, and also of Public Administration and Justice.

In February 2012, after a vote against the second memorandum, she was expelled from her party's parliamentary caucus. The following month she joined the new party Independent Greeks and took up the function of Parliamentary Representative of Parliamentary Group of the party along with Christos Zois.

In the May 2012 elections, she was reelected on the ballot of Independent Greeks in the Serres constituency. On 18 May 2012, she was elected sixth deputy speaker of the Parliament, with 185 votes in favour and 96 abstaining.

In the June 2012 elections, the Independent Greeks placed her first on the list of their candidates (in accordance with the preferences expressed in the May election). The party preserved her seat in Serres RO, renewing only her place in rank. She was elected sixth deputy speaker with 225 votes in favour.

In the election of 25 January 2015, she was re-elected legislator from Serres for the Independent Greeks. With the formation of the First Cabinet of Alexis Tsipras, she was appointed Deputy Minister for Macedonia and Thrace. After having to leave her post during the August–September 2015 Caretaker Cabinet of Vassiliki Thanou-Christophilou, she was nominated again to the same position in the Second Cabinet of Alexis Tsipras. Her nomination was a concession by Tsipras to junior coalition partner the Independent Greeks, who hold a firm position in the Macedonia naming dispute and have been consistently opposed to the use of the word Macedonia in the name of the former Yugoslav country. In a cabinet reshuffle on 29 August 2018, she became Deputy Minister for National Defence.

Ultimately, she resigned from government on 15 January 2019, together with party leader Panos Kammenos, when the Independent Greeks left the government coalition in disagreement with the upcoming ratification of the Prespa Agreement, by which both countries agreed to the country's renaming to North Macedonia.

Kollia-Tsaroucha was a member of the Interparliamentary Assembly on Orthodoxy's International Secretariat, holding the position of treasurer.

== Personal life ==
She is married to Christos Tsarouchas (an architectural engineer). She has one son, Konstantinos (a political scientist) and a daughter Katerina (a sociologist and journalist).

== Electoral results ==
Election	Constituency	Party list	Personal votes	Total votes (party list)	%
2000	Serres	New Democracy	17,757	96,994	53.73
2004	Serres	New Democracy	26,402	100,272	56,41
2007	Serres	New Democracy	19,418	88,534	52.82
2009	Serres	New Democracy	16,605	74,061	46.77
May 2012	Serres	Independent Greeks	6,768	14,311	10.69
June 2012	Serres	Independent Greeks		9,938	7.68
January 2015	Serres	Independent Greeks	4,108	6,875	5.50
September 2015	Serres	Independent Greeks		5,540	4.95
