= Dimitrios Lantzounis =

Greek lawyer and politician

Dimitrios Lantzounis (Greek: Δημήτριος Λαντζούνης; Meligalas, 1909 – 1991), of Ioannis and Eugenia, was Greek lawyer and politician. He acted as an MP for Messenia for two decades.
