= Dodecanese (constituency) =

Parliamentary constituency of Greece

- Electoral constituency for the Hellenic Parliament
- Dodecanese within Greece
- Regional units: Kalymnos; Karpathos-Kasos; Kos; Rhodes
- Administrative region: South Aegean
- Population: 199,774 (June 2023)

Current constituency
- Created: 2012
- Number of members: 5

The Dodecanese electoral constituency (Greek: περιφέρεια Δωδεκανήσων) is a parliamentary constituency of Greece. The district has 199,774 registered voters as of the June 2023 election and elects 5 members to the Hellenic Parliament.

== Current Members ==
Current members of the Hellenic Parliament for Dodecanese
Member	Political party
Ioannis Pappas	New Democracy
Manos Konsolas	New Democracy
Mika Iatridi	New Democracy
Vasileios-Nikolaos Ypsilantis	New Democracy
Georgios Nikitiadis	PASOK-KINAL

== Election Results ==
=== June 2023 Election ===
Party	Votes	%	Seats	+/–
New Democracy	42,507	46.97	4	+1
PASOK-KINAL	13,139	14.52	1	–
Syriza	11,828	13.07	–	-1
Spartans	5,258	5.81	–	–
Greek Solution	4,033	4.46	–	–
Other parties	13,734	15.18	–	–
Total	90,499	100.00	5	–
Valid votes	90,499	98.57		
Invalid votes	805	0.88		
Blank votes	505	0.55		
Total votes	91,809	100.00		
Registered voters/turnout	199,774	45.96		
Source: https://ekloges-prev.singularlogic.eu/2023/june/v/home/en/districts/52/

May 2023 Election

Party	Votes	%	Seats	+/–
New Democracy	52,241	49.93	3	-1
Syriza	15,583	14.89	1	–
PASOK-KINAL	14,041	13.42	1	+1
Greek Solution	4,832	4.62	–	–
Communist Party of Greece	4,182	4.00	–	–
Other parties	13,755	13.15	–	–
Total	104,634	100.00	5	–
Valid votes	104,634	96.78		
Invalid votes	2,813	2.60		
Blank votes	670	0.62		
Total votes	108,117	100.00		
Registered voters/turnout	198,908	54.36		
Source: https://ekloges-prev.singularlogic.eu/2023/may/v/home/en/districts/52/

2019 Election

Party	Votes	%	Seats	+/–
New Democracy	40,034	41.28	4	+3
Syriza	28,826	29.73	1	-2
PASOK-KINAL	10,059	10.37	–	-1
Greek Solution	3,754	3.87	–	–
Golden Dawn	3,575	3.69	–	–
Other parties	10,722	11.06	–	–
Total	96,970	100.00	5	–
Valid votes	96,970	97.51		
Invalid votes	1,808	1.82		
Blank votes	670	0.67		
Total votes	99,448	100.00		
Registered voters/turnout	193,228	51.47		
Source: https://ekloges-prev.singularlogic.eu/2019/v/home/en/districts/52/

September 2015 Election

Party	Votes	%	Seats	+/–
Syriza	30,819	34.54	3	–
New Democracy	25,096	28.13	1	–
PASOK-KINAL	8,472	9.49	1	+1
Golden Dawn	7,185	8.05	–	–
Independent Greeks	3,993	4.48	–	–
Other parties	13,662	15.31	–	–
Total	89,227	100.00	5	–
Valid votes	92,201	96.88		
Invalid votes	1,530	1.61		
Blank votes	1,444	1.52		
Total votes	95,175	100.00		
Registered voters/turnout	185,080	51.42		
Source: https://ekloges-prev.singularlogic.eu/v2015b

January 2015 Election

Party	Votes	%	Seats	+/–
Syriza	34,259	33.26	3	–
New Democracy	33,568	32.59	1	-1
PASOK	8,014	7.78	1	–
Golden Dawn	5,697	5.53	–	–
Independent Greeks	5,478	5.32	–	–
Other parties	15,978	15.51	–	–
Total	102,994	100.00	5	–
Valid votes	102,994	97.20		
Invalid votes	2,273	2.15		
Blank votes	689	0.65		
Total votes	105,956	100.00		
Registered voters/turnout	189,242	55.99		
Source: https://ekloges-prev.singularlogic.eu/v2015a/v/public/index.html?lang=en

June 2012 Election

Party	Votes	%	Seats	+/–
New Democracy	33,410	32.38	2	-1
Syriza	23,608	22.88	1	+1
PASOK	17,211	16.68	1	–
Independent Greeks	9,852	9.55	1	–
Golden Dawn	6,158	5.97	–	–
Other parties	12,952	12.55	–	–
Total	103,191	100.00	5	–
Valid votes	103,191	98.80		
Invalid votes	736	0.70		
Blank votes	514	0.49		
Total votes	104,441	100.00		
Registered voters/turnout	187,960	55.57		
Source: https://ekloges-prev.singularlogic.eu/v2012b/public/index.html

May 2012 Election

Party	Votes	%	Seats	+/–
New Democracy	19,550	16.88	3	+2
Independent Greeks	18,750	16.19	1	+1
PASOK	17,887	15.45	1	-3
Syriza	11,715	10.12	–	–
Golden Dawn	6,456	5.57	–	–
Other parties	41,448	35.79	–	–
Total	115,806	100.00	5	–
Valid votes	105,266	96.83		
Invalid votes	2,700	2.48		
Blank votes	744	0.68		
Total votes	108,710	100.00		
Registered voters/turnout	187,944	57.84		
Source: https://ekloges-prev.singularlogic.eu/v2012b/public/index.html

== See also ==
- List of parliamentary constituencies of Greece
