= Androulakis =

Androulakis (Greek: Ανδρουλάκης) is a Greek surname. Notable people with this surname include:

- Mimis Androulakis (born 1951), Greek author and politician
- Nikos Androulakis (born 1979), Greek politician
