= Thessaloniki B =

Parliamentary constituency of Greece

Location of Thessaloniki B within Greece

Thessaloniki Beta (Greek: εκλογική περιφέρεια Β΄ Θεσσαλονίκης) is a constituency of the Hellenic Parliament. It comprises Thessaloniki Prefecture except for the urban area of Thessaloniki, which constitutes Thessaloniki A. It elects nine members of parliament.

== Election results ==
=== Legislative election ===
Thessaloniki B constituency results
Election	1st party	2nd party	3rd party	4th party	5th party	source
1996	New Democracy 42.06%	PASOK 38.24%	KKE 5.29%	DIKKI 5.21%	SYN 3.99%	
2000	New Democracy 47.70%	PASOK 39.82%	KKE 5.14%	DIKKI 3.01%	SYN 2.38%	
2004	New Democracy 49.77%	PASOK 35.90%	KKE 5.54%	LAOS 3.71%	SYRIZA 2.31%	
2007	New Democracy 44.82%	PASOK 33.77%	KKE 8.14%	LAOS 5.35%	SYRIZA 4.14%	
2009	PASOK 38.23%	New Democracy 37.62%	KKE 7.57%	LAOS 7.48%	SYRIZA 4.08%	
May 2012	New Democracy 20.01%	SYRIZA 14.42%	ANEL 12.04%	PASOK 11.23%	KKE 8.85%	
June 2012	New Democracy 31.91%	SYRIZA 23.40%	PASOK 11.12%	ANEL 9.16%	XA 7.75%	
January 2015	SYRIZA 31.61%	New Democracy 29.26%	XA 7.93%	The River 6.00%	ANEL 5.87%	
September 2015	SYRIZA 32.88%	New Democracy 29.50%	XA 8.44%	Union of Centrists 6.01%	KKE 4.81%	
2019	New Democracy 43.02%	SYRIZA 25.14%	KINAL 6.65%	Greek Solution 5.65%	KKE 4.61%	
May 2023	New Democracy 40.07%	SYRIZA 15.15%	KINAL 10.17%	Greek Solution 7.93%	KKE 6.20%	
June 2023	New Democracy 40.11%	SYRIZA 13.58%	KINAL 9.85%	Greek Solution 7.95%	KKE 6.62%	

== Members of Parliament ==
=== Members (Sep 2015- 2019) ===
- Dimitris Mardas SYRIZA
- Sokratis Famellos SYRIZA
- Theodoros Karaoglou New Democracy
- Savvas Anastasiadis New Democracy
- Athanasios Vardalis Communist Party of Greece
- Giorgos Lazaridis Independent Greeks
- Georgios Arvanitidis PASOK
- Aikaterini Markou The River
- Aristeidis Fokas Union of Centrists

=== Members (Jan 2015- Sep 2015) ===
- Evangelia Ammanatidou-Paschalidou SYRIZA
- Sokratis Famellos SYRIZA
- Theodoros Karaoglou New Democracy
- Savvas Anastasiadis New Democracy
- Fotios Graikos Golden Dawn
- Stavroula Xoulidou Independent Greeks
- Eleni Gerasimidou Communist Party of Greece
- Aikaterini Markou The River
- Georgios Arvanitidis PASOK
