= Piraeus B =

Electoral constituency for the Hellenic Parliament

- Electoral constituency for the Hellenic Parliament
- Regional units: Piraeus, Islands
- Administrative region: Attica
- Electorate: 270,915 (January 2014)

Current Electoral constituency
- Created: 1958
- Number of members: 8 Members of Parliament
- Created from: Piraeus

Piraeus B (Greek: Β΄ Πειραιώς) is a Greek election constituency that includes the Piraeus regional unit municipalities and Salamina. Concretely, this constituency includes the municipalities of Keratsini-Drapetsona, Nikaia-Agios Ioannis Renti, Korydallos, Perama and Salamina. It was created for the 1974 Greek parliament elections and currently elects 8 members of parliament. It is one of five electoral constituencies of the Attica region and former prefecture, along with Piraeus A, Athens A and Athens B, and Remainder of Attica. It was established in 1958, primarily to separate the heavily left-voting suburbs of Piraeus from the municipality of Piraeus and diminish the electoral power of the United Democratic Left.

== Election results ==
=== Legislative election ===
Piraeus B constituency results

Election	1st party	2nd party	3rd party	4th party	5th party	source
1996	PASOK 41.30%	New Democracy 28.95%	KKE 10.14%	SYN 7.33%	DIKKI 6.14%	
2000	PASOK 45.94%	New Democracy 33.34%	KKE 9.76%	SYN 4.53%	DIKKI 3.37%	
2004	PASOK 42.05%	New Democracy 35.59%	KKE 11.06%	SYRIZA 3.97%	LAOS 3.27%	
2007	PASOK 37.93%	New Democracy 31.40%	KKE 14.55%	SYRIZA 6.41%	LAOS 5.52%	
2009	PASOK 44.34%	New Democracy 23.06%	KKE 12.88%	LAOS 7.58%	SYRIZA 5.69%	
May 2012	SYRIZA 23.85%	ANEL 12.40%	KKE 12.29%	New Democracy 9.77%	XA 9.49%	
June 2012	SYRIZA 36.31%	New Democracy 18.63%	ANEL 9.35%	XA 9.28%	PASOK 7.94%	
January 2015	SYRIZA 42.07%	New Democracy 18.94%	KKE 8.19%	XA 7.80%	ANEL 5.55%	
September 2015	SYRIZA 42.02%	New Democracy 18.31%	XA 8.40%	KKE 7.94%	ANEL 4.70%	
2019	SYRIZA 38.22%	New Democracy 30.19%	KKE 8.02%	KINAL 5.09%	MeRA25 4.40%	
May 2023	New Democracy 37.44%	SYRIZA 20.75%	KKE 10.83%	PASOK-KINAL 7.41%	Hellenic Solution 4.70%	
June 2023	New Democracy 37.24%	SYRIZA 19.36%	KKE 11.49%	PASOK-KINAL 7.60%	Spartans 5.60%	

== Members of Parliament ==
=== Current members ===
- Eirini Kasimati (SYRIZA)
- Evaggelia Karakosta (SYRIZA)
- Dimitrios Vitsas (SYRIZA)
- Ioannis Tragakis (ND)
- Diamanto Manolakou (KKE)
- Ioannis Lagos (XA)
- Panagiotis Kammenos (ANEL)
- Theodora Megaloikonomou (INDEPENDENT)

=== Members (Jan 2015- Sep 2015) ===
The members of parliament after the January 2015 election are considered below. The most votes for The River were for party chairman Stavros Theodorakis, but he chose the seat of Chania, so the seat of Piraeus B passed to Nikos Orfanos.

- Panagiotis Lafazanis (SYRIZA)
- Eirini Kasimati (SYRIZA)
- Evaggelia Karakosta (SYRIZA)
- Ioannis Tragakis (ND)
- Diamanto Manolakou (KKE)
- Ioannis Lagos (XA)
- Dimitris Kammenos (ANEL)
- Nikos Orfanos (The River)
