= Maria Kanellopoulou (actress) =

Greek actor and politician

- Μαρία Κανελλοπούλου

Member of the Hellenic Parliament
- In office 17 May 2012 – 28 August 2015
- Constituency: Achaea (2012–2015)

Personal details
- Born: 25 May 1951 (age 75) Kalavryta, Achaea, Greece
- Party: Nea Aristera (2024–present)
- Other political affiliations: Syriza (2007–2023)
- Education: Drama School "People's Experimental Theater"
- Occupation: Politician; Actress

Maria Kanellopoulou (born May 25, 1951) is a Greek actress and politician.

== Biography ==
She was born on May 25, 1951, in Kalavryta. She participated in the events at the Polytechnic University, where she was arrested. She has acted in many television series. She became known to the general public by starring in the television series Mana einai mono mia, Emeis ki Emeis, Oi stavloi tis Erietas Zaimi and To kafe tis Charas.

== Political career ==
She was a candidate for Achaia parliamentarian with SYRIZA in the 2007 and 2009 elections. She was then elected as a municipal councilor of Athens until 2012, while in the parliamentary elections of May 2012 she was elected MP with 8,760 votes, second behind the party's president Alexis Tsipras.

She was re-elected in the elections of June 2012 and January 2015. In August 2015, she announced that she would not run for re-election in the parliamentary elections. However, in the May and June 2023 elections, she was a candidate for parliament with SYRIZA-P.S. in the Athens A constituency.

In November 2023, she left SYRIZA and joined the Nea Aristera.

== Personal life ==
She never married and had no children.
