= Christian Democratic Party of the Overthrow =

Christian Democratic Party of the Overthrow Χριστιανοδημοκρατικό Κόμμα Ανατροπής
- Leader: Nikolaos Nikolopoulos
- Founder: Nikolaos Nikolopoulos
- Founded: 23 May 2013
- Split from: New Democracy
- Ideology: Christian democracy Cultural liberalism Fiscal conservatism
- Hellenic Parliament: 0 / 300
- European Parliament (Greek seats): 0 / 21

The Christian Democratic Party of the Overthrow (Greek: Χριστιανοδημοκρατικό Κόμμα Ανατροπής), previously named as Christian Democratic Party of Greece (Greek: Χριστιανοδημοκρατικό Κόμμα Ελλάδος), is a fiscal conservative and Christian democratic political party of Greece. It was founded on 23 May 2013 by Nikos Nikolopoulos, a former MP of the New Democracy party from Achaea.

During the presentation of the party, Nikos Nikolopoulos stated that the Christian Democratic Party is located in the political spectrum in the place where New Democracy was before the elections of May 2012 and that it continues the political tradition of the founder of New Democracy, Konstantinos Karamanlis.
