= Nikolaos Nikolopoulos =

Greek politician (born 1958)

- Νίκος Νικολόπουλος
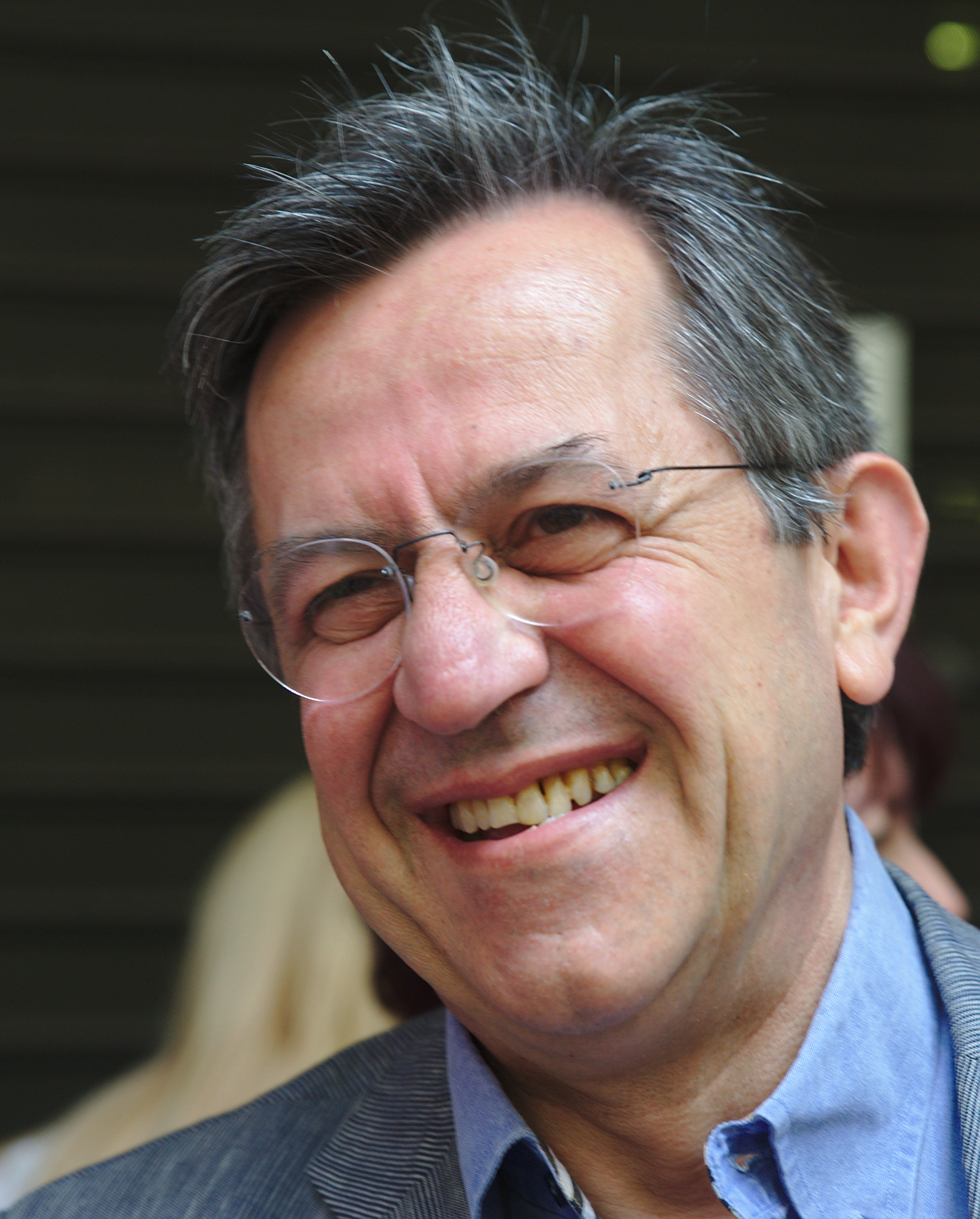

Member of the Greek Parliament
- In office 1989–2007
- Constituency: Achaea
- In office 2009 – 7 July 2019

Deputy Minister of Labour, Social Security and Welfare Greece
- In office 21 June 2012 – 12 July 2012

Personal details
- Born: 21 February 1958 (age 68) Patras, Kingdom of Greece
- Party: Christian Democratic Party
- Other political affiliations: Independent Greeks (2014-2015); New Democracy (until 2012)
- Spouse: Anastasia Manolopoulou
- Education: Panteion University; University of Athens
- Occupation: Politician
- Profession: Banker

Nikolaos Nikolopoulos (Greek: Νίκος Νικολόπουλος; born 1958) is a Greek politician. He has served as Member of the Greek Parliament from 2009 to 2019 and previously from 1989 to 2007. He formerly sat as an Independent, after leaving the Independent Greeks.

== Life and education ==
Nikolaso Nikolopoulos studied politics at Panteion University followed by Social Theology at the University of Athens. He subsequently completed an MBA in Economics and Management and worked as a banker. He is married to Anastasia Manolopoulou with three children.

== Political career ==
Nikolopoulos was first elected as a Member of Parliament in 1989 representing Achaea for New Democracy. He served in this role until 2007. He was elected again in 2009. During the talks on the Cypriot accession to the European Union he served on the Committee of Greek and Cypriot ministers for Cyprus’ accession to the EU. From 21 June 2012 until 12 July 2012, he served as Deputy Minister of Labour, Social Security and Welfare Greece in the New Democracy-PASOK-DIMAR coalition government. He resigned following disagreements and was subsequently removed from the Parliamentary Group of New Democracy and then sat with the Independent Democratic MPs. He joined the Independent Greeks in 2014 He was removed from the Independent Greeks Parliamentary Group in November 2015.

== Controversy ==
Nikolopoulos attracted international attention after he tweeted abuse to the Prime Minister of Luxembourg, Xavier Bettel after Bettel announced his engagement to his same-sex partner. Nikolopoulos tweeted to Bettel "FROM EUROPE OF NATION STATES… TO A EUROPE OF FAGGOT MATES!!! The Prime Minister of Luxembourg got engaged with his beloved!!" Bettel replied to his tweet stating "Hello, I heard you want to tell me something, but I don’t speak Greek. Sorry" and stated that Greek-Luxembourg relations "won’t be affected by the comments of an isolated politician." Nikolopoulos later claimed he "copied" the message from a "blog" and likened homosexuality to "paedophilia and bestiality" which he claimed were "accepted in Germany and The Netherlands".
