= Mika Iatridi =

Mika Iatridi MP
- Μίκα Ιατρίδη

Member of the Hellenic Parliament for Dodecanese
- Incumbent
- Assumed office 7 July 2019
- In office 4 October 2009 – 31 December 2014

Personal details
- Born: 31 October 1977 (age 48) Rhodes
- Party: New Democracy (2014-); Independent Greeks (2012-2014); New Democracy (2007-2012)
- Education: Aristotle University of Thessaloniki; University of the Aegean
- Website: website

Mika Iatridi (Greek: Μίκα Ιατρίδη; born 31 October 1977), also known by her full name Tsampika Iatridi (Greek: Τσαμπίκα Ιατρίδη) is a Greek politician and economist who has represented the Dodecanese constituency in the Hellenic Parliament since July 2019. A member of the New Democracy party, she previously represented the constituency from 2009 to 2014, initially with New Democracy and subsequently with the Independent Greeks and as an independent MP.

== Early life and education ==
Iatridi was born in Rhodes, Greece in 1977. She attended Venetokleio High School in Rhodes before studying economics at the Aristotle University of Thessaloniki. She subsequently completed a postgraduate qualification in educational planning at the University of the Aegean in 2007.

Following her university studies, Iatridi worked as a teacher at schools on Rhodes and subsequently in the revenue department of the Municipality of Ialysos. She also became involved with the Dodecanese branch of the Economic Chamber of Greece, where she was elected to its governing committee in 2002.

== Political career ==
=== Early political activities and election to parliament ===
During her university years, Iatridi was politically active in DAP-NDFK, the student organisation associated with New Democracy. She was first elected to the Hellenic Parliament for the Dodecanese constituency in the 2009 parliamentary election, representing New Democracy.

=== Departure from new Democracy and Independent Greeks (2012–2014) ===
In February 2012, Iatridi was expelled from the New Democracy's parliamentary group after voting against Greece's second international financial bailout agreement. She subsequently joined Independent Greeks, a party founded by Panos Kammenos, and was re-elected to parliament in both the May and June 2012 general elections.

In June 2014, Iatridi announced her departure from Independent Greeks, becoming an independent member of parliament. In a letter to party leader Kammenos, she stated that the party had lost its political direction and had failed to communicate its message effectively to voters. Her departure was report amid a series of defections from the Independent Greeks parliamentary group. She later joined the parliamentary grouping of Independent Democratic MPs.

=== Return to New Democracy ===
On 30 December 2024, Iatridi rejoined New Democracy following a meeting with Prime Minister Antonis Samaras. Her return came after she supported the government's presidential candidate in the final unsuccessful parliamentary ballot of December 2014, which preceded a snap general election. Iatridi did not retain a parliamentary seat in the January 2015 election and remained outside of parliament during the subsequent parliamentary term.

=== Re-election in 2019 ===
Iatridi returned to parliament following the July 2019 general election. In July 2019, she was elected deputy secretary-general of New Democracy's parliamentary group. She also became secretary of the Standing Committee on Economic Affairs and participated in the Special Permanent Committee on Regions and the Subcommittee on Island and Mountainous Regions. She was subsequently re-elected in the parliamentary elections of May and June 2023, continuing to represent the Dodecanese constituency.

In October 2025, she submitted a parliamentary representation requesting additional teaching staff for the primary school and kindergarten serving Fry and Arvanitochori on the island of Kasos. The submission called for additional personnel to support the operation of the schools.

== Personal life ==
Iatridi speaks English and German. She is a member of the Economic Chamber of Greece.
