= Evi Christofilopoulou =

Greek lawyer, politician and university professor

Evi Christofilopoulou MP
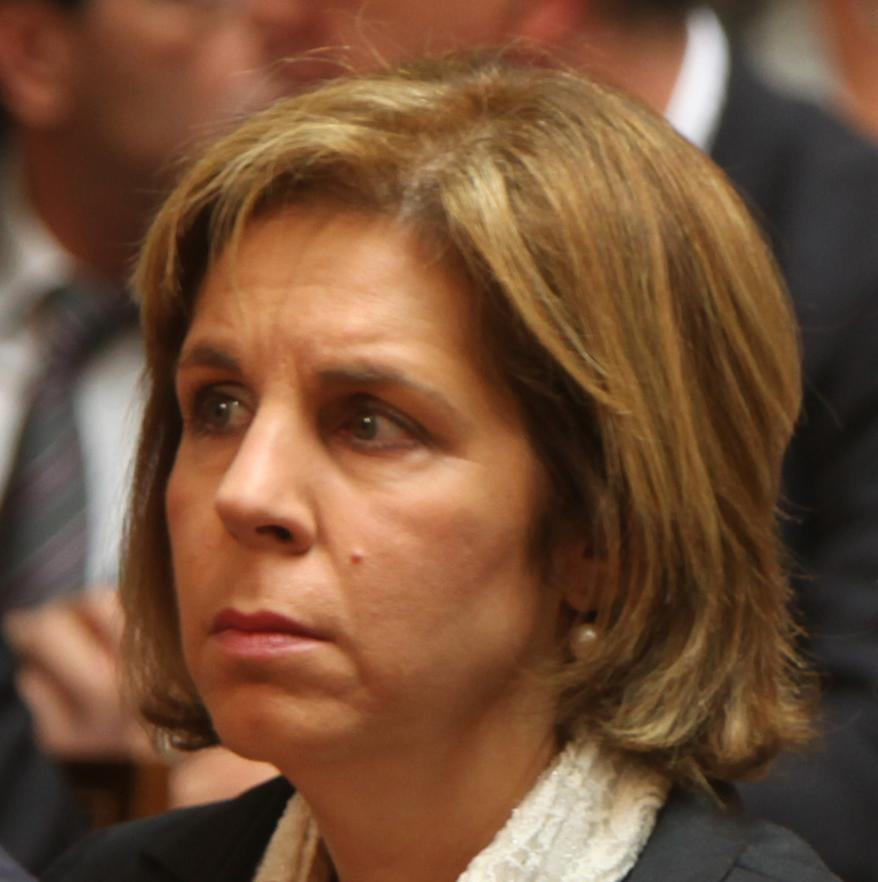
- Evi Christofilopoulou

Deputy Minister of Administrative Reform and e-Governance
- In office 25 June 2013 – 27 January 2015
- Prime Minister: Antonis Samaras
- Preceded by: Manousos Voloudakis

Deputy Minister of Education, Lifelong learning and Religions
- In office 7 October 2009 – 17 May 2012 Serving with Anna Diamantopoulou, George Babiniotis
- Prime Minister: George Papandreou, Lucas Papademos
- Preceded by: Andreas Lykouretzos, Spyridon Taliadouros
- Succeeded by: Ioannis Ioannidis, Theodoros Papatheodorou

Personal details
- Born: 14 April 1956 (age 70) Athens, Greece
- Party: Panhellenic Socialist Movement (PASOK) (1999-2024); New Democracy (ND) (2024-)
- Education: National and Kapodistrian University of Athens; London School of Economics
- Profession: Professor, Politician
- Website: www.christofilopoulou.gr

Evi Christofilopoulou (Greek: Εύη Χριστοφιλοπούλου; born 14 April 1956 in Athens) is a Greek politician and Member of the Hellenic Parliament. Between 2013 and January 2015 she has been serving as Deputy Minister of Education, Lifelong learning and Religions in the Greek Ministry of Interior and Administrative Reconstruction.

== Early life and education ==
Evi Christofilopoulou was born in 1956 in Athens, Greece. She graduated from the Law School of the National and Kapodistrian University of Athens.

After her graduation, she entered the London School of Economics where she obtained a Master of Science in Political Science as well as a Ph.D. in Public Administration and Civil Policy.

She is fluent in English and French.

== Career ==
From 1986 until 1991, Evi Christofilopoulou was in charge of the Sector of member Development for the Local Administration in E.E.T.A.A.

From 1992 until 1997, she co-operated with the National Bank of Greece, as well as enterprises of the private sector in the field of human resources development.

She had also been a Special Consultant of Georgios Gennimatas during his post in the Ministry of Economics.

== Academic career ==
Evi Christofilopoulou has been a Professor in the Department of Public Administration of Engineers and Regional Development of the University of Thessaly, as well as in Post-Doctorate courses of the Department of Political Sciences and Public Administration of the Law School of the National and Kapodistrian University of Athens.

Evi Christofilopoulou, is currently an assistant Professor in the School of Business Administration of the Hellenic Open University.

== Politics ==
Evi Christofilopoulou joined the Panhellenic Socialist Movement in 1999.

From 1997 until 2002, she was the General Secretary of the Administration of Public Funds in charge of the planning and administration of employment and education for Civil Policies. She has been a member of the Committee of Civil Cases and Research for the Technological Equipment of the Hellenic Parliament.

From 2004 until December 2006, Evi Christofilopoulou was the co-ordinator for Civil Cases in the Parliamentary Team of the Panhellenic Socialist Movement. She has been a member of the Committee of the program of the Panhellenic Socialist Movement in charge for the policies related to the family and children.

In March 2004, she was elected as a member of the Hellenic Parliament with the Panhellenic Socialist Movement in the Prefecture of Attica (greater Athens). In October 2009, she was re-elected as a member of the Hellenic Parliament and was appointed as the Deputy Minister of Education, Lifelong learning and Religions in the Cabinet of George Papandreou, which she remained in the Papademos. Following the June 2012 Greek legislative election, she was named spokesperson of the PASOK parliamentary group in the Hellenic Parliament, together with Michalis Chrisochoidis, a position she left on 25 June 2013 after joining the Coalition Cabinet of Antonis Samaras as Deputy Minister of Administrative Reform and e-Governance.

On January 29, 2024, she joined New Democracy, declaring her support for the Second Cabinet of Kyriakos Mitsotakis.

== Personal life ==
Evi Christofilopoulou is married to Dimitris Christofilopoulos. They have a daughter, Eliana, and a son, Paulos.
