= Emeis ki Emeis =

- Genre: Comedy
- Created by: Panos Amarantidis; Spyros Metallinos
- Directed by: Fotis Polychronopoulos; Panagiotis Koutras; Spyros Metallinos; Pinelopi Krontiropoulou
- Starring: Eleni Gerasimidou; Maria Filippou; Maria Kanellopoulou; Vasilis Koukouras; Smaragda Diamantidou; Stelios Pavlou; Natasa Manisali; Giorgos Giannoutsos
- Theme music composer: Tolis Ketselidis
- Country of origin: Greece
- Original language: Greek
- No. of seasons: 4
- No. of episodes: 140

Production
- Executive producer: Froso Ralli
- Producer: Studio ATA
- Production locations: Athens, Greece
- Running time: 22-25 minutes
- Production company: Studio ATA

Original release
- Network: Mega Channel
- Release: September 15, 1994 – June 26, 1998

Emeis ki Emeis (English: Us and Us) is a comedy television series that aired on Mega Channel from 1994 to 1998. The creators of the series were Panos Amarantidis and Spyros Metallinos, and it focused on the lives of a group of people with different personalities, in their forties, who live in the same apartment building in the Mets area. The series was a great success, which is why it lasted four years, and since then it has been frequently rerun by the station. It is also noteworthy that the title of the first and last episodes was the same.

== Plot ==
On the ground floor of an apartment building, in the Mets area, lives Stelios Damigos, an automotive electrician, with his wife, Maria Theofanous-Damigou, the owner of the building and a philologist originally from Cyprus. On the upper floor, in a two-room apartment, lives Smaragda Lazaridou, a medical visitor by profession, with her older sister Antonia, a private secretary and single. In addition, Smaragda's partner, Vasilis Papadopoulos, a young, handsome, aspiring actor of the "quality scene" but permanently unemployed, also lives with them. In the same apartment building, there is also Natasa Saritzoglou, an exuberant woman who works in public relations for a major record company, and Makis Toufexis, who is a terrific guy, a sex maniac, but a looser from birth, who works as a tour guide. Finally, the tenants of the apartment building are completed by Parthena, a naive woman of Pontic origin, cousin of the Lazaridis brothers, who also runs a convenience store in the neighborhood. The works and days of a very loved group, who knows very well that even when they argue, in the end they cannot live apart at all.

== Cast ==
- Eleni Gerasimidou as Parthena Oustampasidou
- Maria Filippou as Maria Theofanous-Damigou
- Maria Kanellopoulou as Antonia Lazaridou
- Vasilis Koukouras as Vasilis Papadopoulos
- Smaragda Diamantidou as Smaragda Lazaridou
- Stelios Pavlou as Stelios Damigos
- Natasa Manisali as Matasa Saritzoglou
- Giorgos Giannoutsos as Makis Toufexis
- Antonis Xenos as Antonis Tzoumanikas
- Konstantinos Katselis as Telis Kandylis
- Katerina Sasli as Katerina Avgoulomati
- Tasos Pezirkianidis as Champos Oustampasidis
