= Elis (constituency) =

Electoral district in southwest Greece

- Constituency for the Hellenic Parliament
- Elis within West Greece

- West Greece within Greece
- Regional Unit: Elis
- Region: West Greece
- Electorate: 179,411 (June 2012)

Current constituency
- Number of members: Six

Elis is a constituency in West Greece represented in the Hellenic Parliament. It elects five Members of Parliament (MPs) by the reinforced proportional representation system of election. It comprises the Elis regional unit.

== Election results ==
=== Legislative election ===
Elis constituency results

Election	1st party	2nd party	3rd party	4th party	5th party	source
June 2012	New Democracy 30.45%	SYRIZA 26.21%	PASOK 16.55%	XA 7.61%	ANEL 6.04%	
January 2015	SYRIZA 37.93%	New Democracy 26.89%	PASOK 8.16%	XA 6.04%	KIDISO 4.83%	
September 2015	SYRIZA 37.22%	New Democracy 27.00%	PASOK 10.71%	XA 7.62%	KKE 4.63%	
2019	SYRIZA 37.22%	New Democracy 27.00%	PASOK 14.79%	KKE 3.62%	EL 2.88%	
May 2023	New Democracy 37.69%	SYRIZA 23.91%	PASOK 19.29%	KKE 5.00%	EL 3.36%	
June 2023	New Democracy 37.45%	SYRIZA 20.13%	PASOK 19.74%	KKE 5.48%	Spartans 4.59%	

== Members of Parliament ==
=== Members (2015 to 2018) ===
- Gerasimos Balaouras SYRIZA
- Dimitris Baxevanakis SYRIZA
- Efi Georgopoulou-Saltari SYRIZA
- Konstantinos Tzavaras ND
- Giannis Koutsoukos PASOK

=== Members (Jan 2015–Sep 2015) ===
Since election of January 2015 Elis elected five members of parliament

- Gerasimos Balaouras SYRIZA
- Dimitris Baxevanakis SYRIZA
- Efi Georgopolou-Saltari SYRIZA
- Konstantinos Tzavaras ND
- Giannis Koutsoukos PASOK

=== Members of Parliament (2012–2015) ===
In Election 2012 Elis elected six members of parliament

- Konstantinos Tzavaras ND
- Dionysia - Theodora Avgerinopoulou ND
- Georgios Kontogiannis ND
- Andreas Marinos ND
- Efstathia Georgopoulou - Saltari SYRIZA
- Giannis Koutsoukos PASOK
