= Ioannis Pappas =

Greek politician and economist

Ioannis Pappas MP
- Ιωάννης Παππάς

Member of the Hellenic Parliament for Dodecanese
- Incumbent
- Assumed office 7 July 2019
- In office 6 May 2012 – 12 May 2012

Personal details
- Born: 6 May 1968 (age 58) Rhodes
- Party: New Democracy
- Education: Aristotle University of Thessaloniki; National and Kapodistrian University of Athens
- Website: website

Ioannis Pappas (Greek: Γιάννης Κ. Παππάς; born 6 March 1968) is a Greek politician and economist, serving as a Member of the Hellenic Parliament for Dodecanese. He served as Deputy Minister of Shipping and Island Policy from June 2023 until June 2024.

== Early life and education ==
Pappas was born in Rhodes, Greece on 6 March 1968. He studied business administration, specialising in the agriculture sector, at Aristotle University of Thessaloniki. He also graduated in economics and political sciences from the National and Kapodistrian University of Athens.

== Business career ==
Before entering parliament, Pappas held management and executive positions in the telecommunications industry.

He subsequently worked for eleven years as a senior executive at Pegasus Publishing S.A.

From 2012, he worked as a corporate development consultant for teh Parapolitika media group. He also has been involved in the food service industry.

== Political career ==
Pappas was first elected to the Hellenic Parliament for the Dodecanese constituency in the May 2012 Greek parliamentary election. He returned to parliament following the 2019 Greek parliamentary election and was re-elected in May and June 2023.

During his parliamentary career, Pappas has served on the Standing Committee on Public Administration, Public Order and Justice and Special Permanent Committee on Greeks Abroad.
