= Independent Democratic MPs =

- President of Parliamentary Group: Paris Moutsinas
- Secretary of Parliamentary Group: Yiannis Kourakos
- Founded: 23 November 2013
- Parliament: 17 / 300

The Independent Democratic MPs (Greek: Ανεξάρτητοι Δημοκρατικοί Βουλευτές, Anexartitoi Dimokratikoi Vouleftes) was a recognized parliamentary group of the Hellenic Parliament.

This parliamentary group included independent MPs originally elected with New Democracy, the Panhellenic Socialist Movement, the Coalition of the Radical Left, the Independent Greeks and the Democratic Left parties.
