= Maria Giannakaki =

Greek politician (born 1969)

- Μαρία Γεωργίου Γιαννακάκη
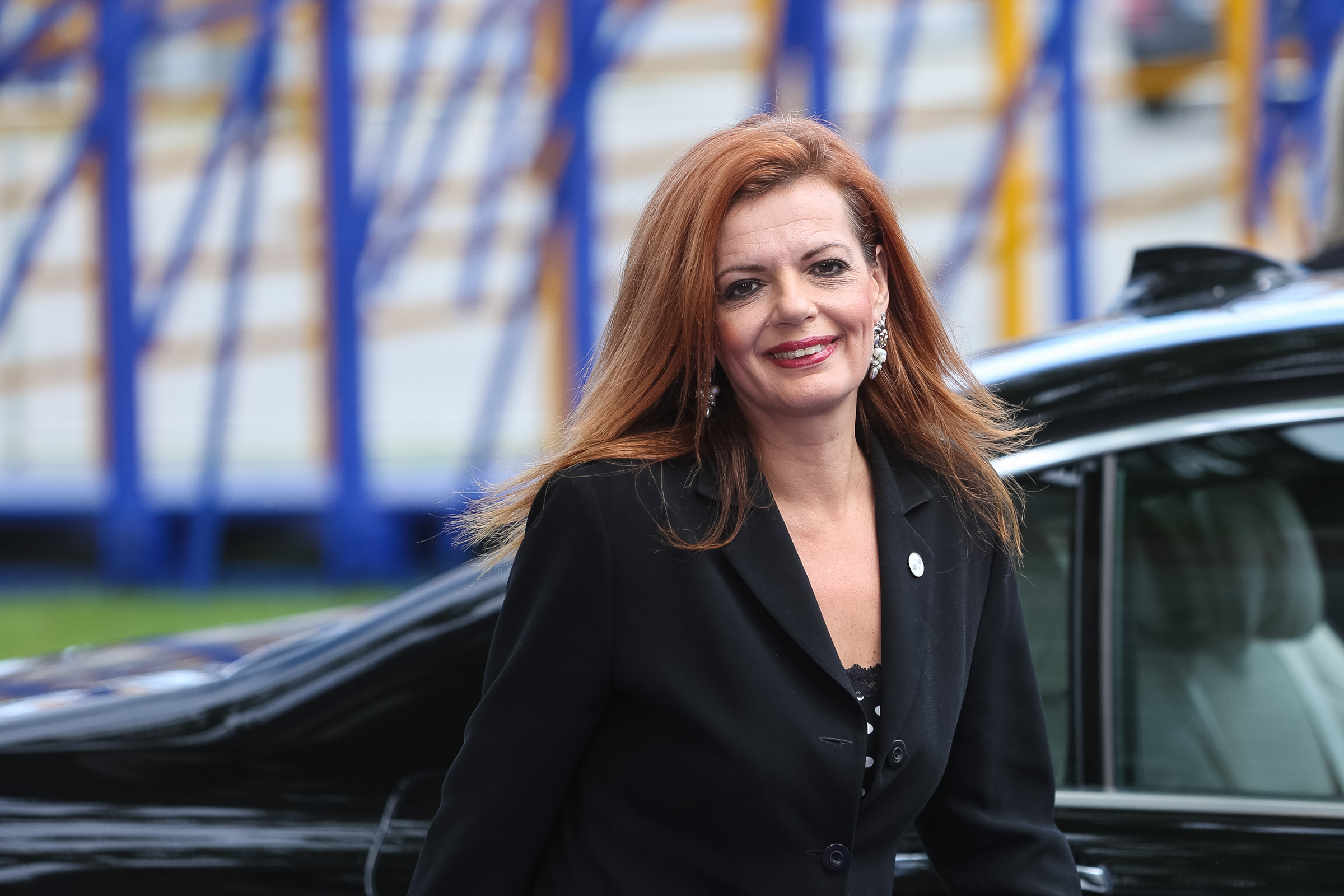

Secretary General of the Ministry of Justice
- In office 2 December 2016 – 8 July 2019
- Prime Minister: Alexis Tsipras
- Minister: Stavros Kontonis

Member of the Parliament of the Hellenes
- In office 6 May 2012 – 31 December 2014

Personal details
- Born: May 6, 1969 (age 57) Piraeus, Greece
- Party: Democratic Left; Syriza
- Education: University of Athens
- Occupation: Politician
- Website: pace.coe.int/en/members/6979/giannakaki

Maria Georgiou Giannakaki (Greek: Μαρία Γεωργίου Γιαννακάκη; born 6 May 1969) is a Greek politician, former Democratic Left MP and former secretary general at the Ministry of Justice, Transparency and Human Rights.

== Biography and political career ==
She was born in Piraeus, near Athens in 6 May 1969 1969 and grew up in Nice. She studied Classics and Political Sciences at the University of Athens and graduated in Paris.

She was a founding member of the Democratic Left and a member of the Central Committee of the party. Was elected MP with the Democratic Left in the May and June 2012 elections.

In the regional elections of 2014 she was a candidate for the Attica Regional Council with the combination of "Intervention for Attica – Democratic Ecological Movement", supported by the Democratic Left and Ecologist Greens. She was elected regional councilor with 28,601 votes and 1.76%.

At the 4th Congress of the Democratic Left in June 2015 she was the party's presidential candidate. She came second behind Thanasis Theocharopoulos taking 40.84% and 241 votes.

She left the Democratic Left in August 2015 because of her disagreement with the party's decision to vote with PASOK.

Since December 2016 she has been General Secretary for Transparency and Human Rights at the Ministry of Justice, Transparency and Human Rights.

In June 2017, as Secretary-General of Transparency and Human Rights, she drafted the amendment to Laws 187 and 187A (Law on "Criminal Organizations" and "Tromonomos"). This amendment was attempted to be passed by an amendment to a bill that is irrelevant to the Penal Code, while it was criticized as an attempt to criminalize public discourse. This amendment was finally withdrawn temporarily for further processing
