= Panagiotis Iliopoulos =

Greek politician

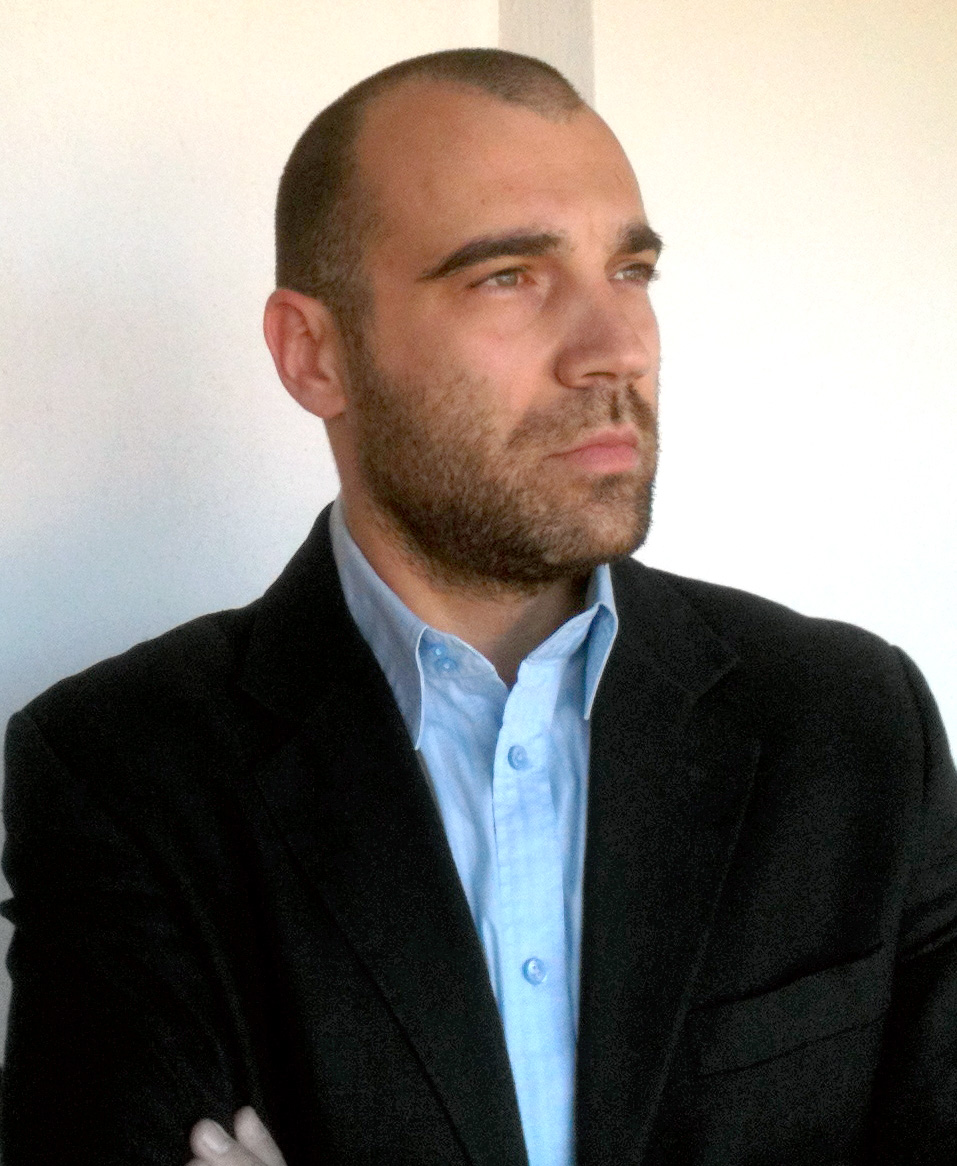
Panagiotis Iliopoulos 2012

Panagiotis Iliopoulos (Greek: Παναγιώτης Ηλιόπουλος; born 30 March 1978, Athens) is a Greek former member of parliament for Golden Dawn and convicted criminal.

In 2014 he was arrested for the first time and put into pre-trial detention for 18 months after the murder of Pavlos Fyssas.

He left the party after it failed to enter parliament in the 2019 Greek legislative election, together with various other members.

In 2020, Golden Dawn was deemed by the courts to be a criminal organisation, and Iliopoulos was convicted as a member and a leader. He was sentenced to seven years in jail.
