= Evangelos Basiakos =

Greek politician

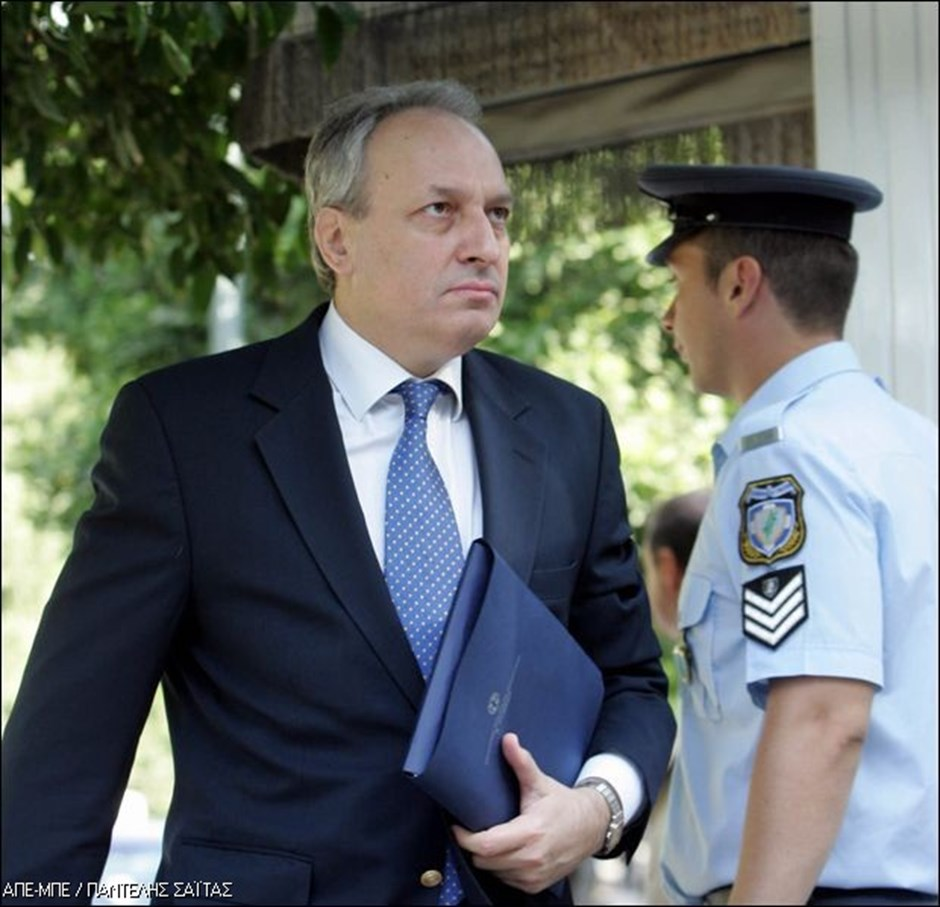

Minister for Rural Development and Food
- In office 23 September 2004 – 19 September 2007

Deputy Minister for Rural Development and Food
- In office 9 March 2004 – 23 September 2004

Deputy Minister of Agriculture
- In office 3 December 1992 – 13 October 1993

MP of the Hellenic Parliament
- In office 18 June 1989 – 17 February 2017

Personal details
- Born: 1954 Thebes, Greece
- Died: 17 February 2017 Athens, Greece
- Party: New Democracy
- Spouse: Vikentia Syropoulou
- Children: Athanasios-Aristeidis Basiakos
- Profession: Lawyer
- Website: http://ebassiakos.gr

Evangelos Basiakos (or Evangelos Bassiakos) (Greek: Ευάγγελος Μπασιάκος; 1954 in Thebes, Greece – 17 February 2017) was a Greek politician in the New Democracy party, Member of Parliament for Boetia and Minister for Rural Development and Food.

== Qualification and positions ==
Lawyer, Political Scientist, LL.M., Beotia MP, Deputy Minister, Minister, Member of Parliamentary Assembly of International Organizations, Head of Environmental Sector ND.

== Studies ==
Studies in Law and Political Sciences at the University of Athens. Postgraduate Studies in International Law and Political Science in London (1979-1981), when he took his degrees DIPLOMA and MASTERS, University College London (UCL). He specialised in the Law of the EEC, in International and European Organizations, the Human Rights, Policy in Western Europe and in Political Sociology. Post Graduate courses at the Academy of International Law in The Hague, NATO and the EEC, the International Institute of Human Rights in Strasbourg, at the Seminar of the Harvard Alumni and at Faculty of the University of Pacific.

== Party activities ==
Member of the New Democracy Party (ND) and ONNED since their foundation. He has served as – Member of Central Committee of Local Authorities (KETA) of ND (1987-1989). – Assistant Secretary for International Relations of ND (1993-1994) – Secretary of Rural Development ND (1994-1996) – Chairman of Parliamentary Group Project (OKE) of ND for Agriculture (1997-2000). – Head of Agricultural Policy ND (2000-2001) – Head of Agricultural Sector ND (July 2001 – 2004). – Head of Environmental Sector ND (2015- ).

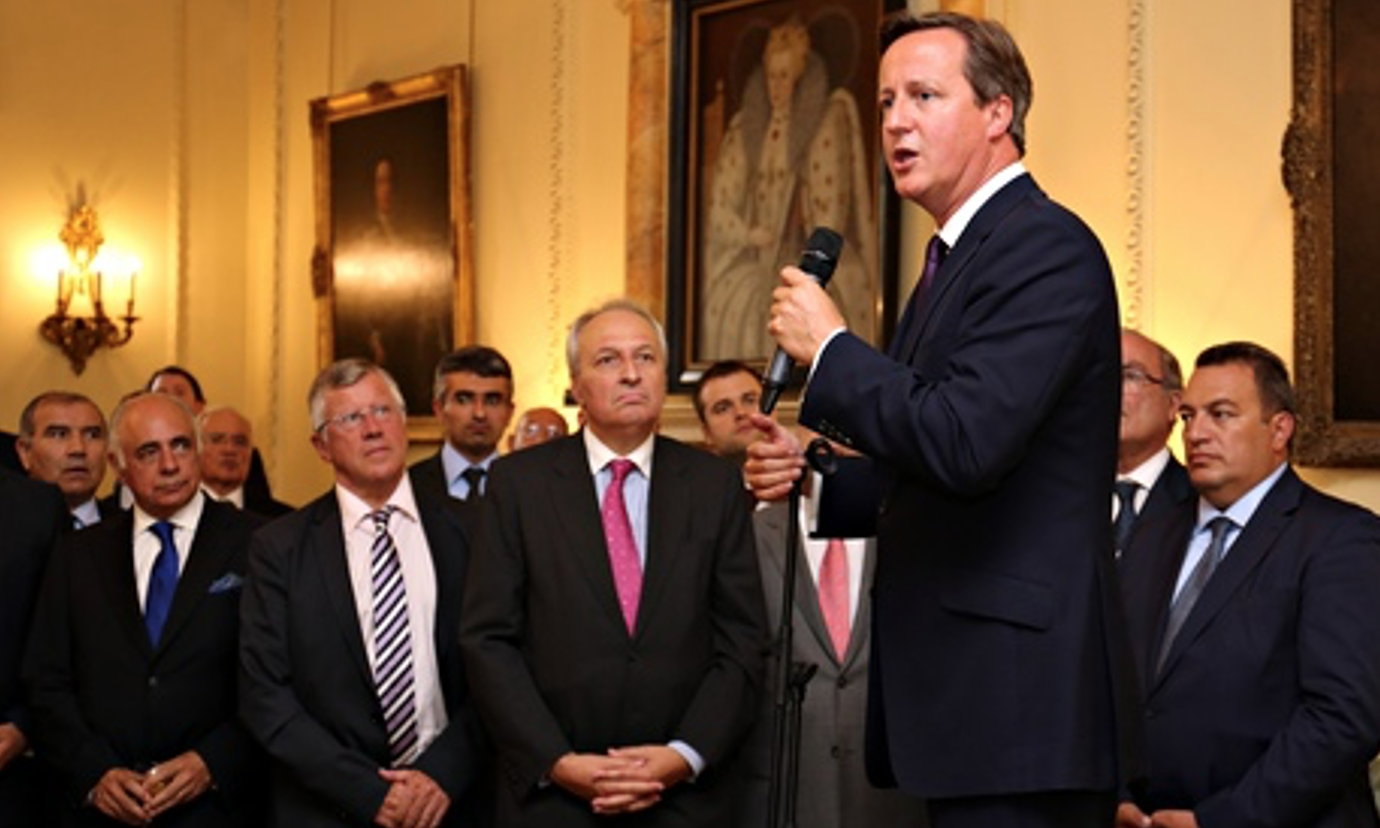
Evangelos Basiakos with British PM David Cameron in 10 Downing Street (September 2, 2014)

== Parliamentary career ==
He was elected MP of Beotia ND, elections in June and November 1989, 1990, 1996, 2000, 2004, 2007, May 2012, June 2012, January 2015 and September 2015 (first MP in the 1996 elections, 2000, 2004, 2007, May 2012, June 2012, January 2015 and September 2015). Elected Secretary of the House in July and November 1989. Full member of the Inter-Parliamentary Union (1989-1990), the Parliamentary Assembly of the Council of Europe (1990-1991), the International Organisation for Security and Cooperation in Europe (OSCE 1996 – 2004) and NATO (2007 – 2009 and 2012-now). He participated in many NATO summits in several countries including: USA, Russia, France, Germany, Italy, Belgium, Norway, Azerbaijan, Kazakhstan. From 2012 he participated in NATO summits in Iceland, Czech Republic, Belgium, France, Luxemburg, Germany, Croatia, Lithuania, United Kingdom, Italy and Holland. From 2015 in Hungary, Ukraine, Norway, Belgium, Albania, Ukraine, Turkey and the United States of America.

== Government action ==
Deputy Minister of Agriculture from 3.12.1992 to 13.10.1993. Responsible for Forests and Natural Environment (Dec. 1992-May 1993), and responsible for the management of agricultural products, subsidies EEC, the Livestock and Agricultural “Research and Applications” (June – October ’93). Deputy Minister for Agricultural Development and Food initially (09/03/2004) and Minister for Agricultural Development and Food from 23.9.2004 to 19.9.2007.

== Later years ==
MP of Beotia ND. Head of Environmental Sector ND. Vice-President, Special Parliamentary Committee on Road Safety. Member of Parliamentary Assembly / Nato. Member of Parliamentary Committee on Product and Trade.

== Personal life ==
He was married to Vicentia Syropoulou and father of a son called Athanasios-Aristeidis.
