= Asimina Skondra =

Greek politician

Asimina Skondra is a Greek politician from New Democracy. She was elected to the Hellenic Parliament from Karditsa in the June 2023 Greek legislative election.

She is vice president of the Greece and Azerbaijan's Friendship Group in the Greek Parliament.
