= Athanasios Bouras =

Greek politician

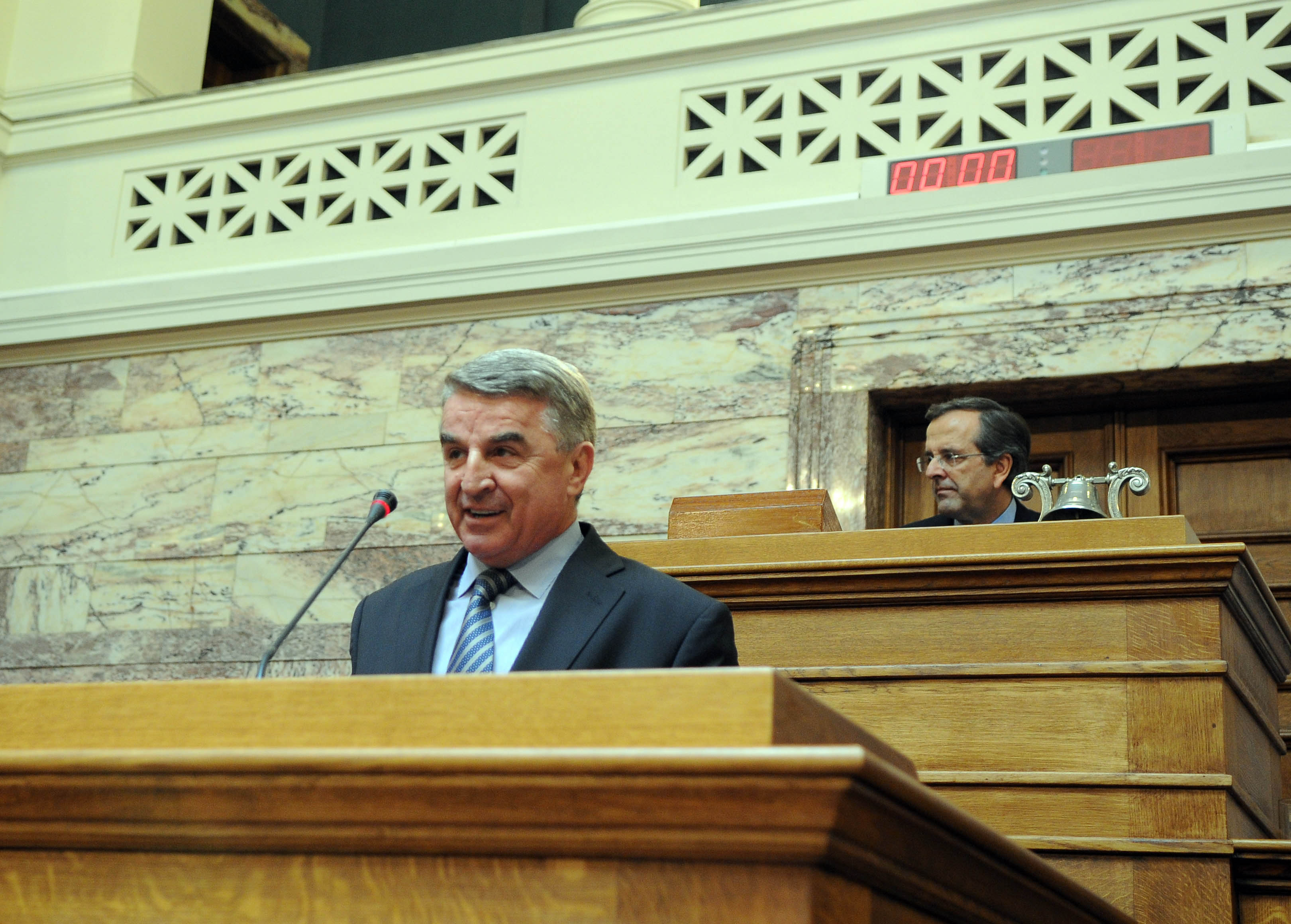
Photo of Athanasios Bouras

Athanasios (Thanasis) Bouras (Greek: Αθανάσιος (Θανάσης) Μπούρας) is a Greek politician. He holds a Ph.D. in physics and several physics publications. He was the deputy finance minister from 1990 to 1993 and currently represents Attica in the Hellenic Parliament. He is a member of New Democracy.
