= Dionysia-Theodora Avgerinopoulou =

Greek politician

- Διονυσία-Θεοδώρα Αυγερινοπούλου
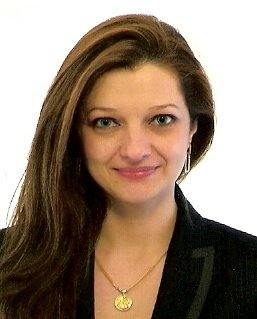

Member of the Hellenic Parliament
- In office 2009–2015
- Constituency: Elis (Ilia), Greece

Member of the Hellenic Parliament
- In office 2019–Present
- Constituency: Elis (Ilia), Greece

Chair of the Special Permanent Committee on Environmental Protection
- In office 2019–Present
- Incumbent
- Assumed office 6 October 2009

Personal details
- Born: 10 September 1975 (age 50) Patras, Achaea; Greece
- Party: New Democracy
- Education: National and Kapodistrian University of Athens (LL.B.); Georgetown University (LL.M.); Columbia University (J.S.D.)
- Occupation: Lawyer, Politician
- Profession: Lawyer
- Awards: Green Star Award (UNEP / OCHA / Green Cross International, 2011) Global Citizenship Award for Leadership in Assisting Humanity (2010) Young Global Leader (World Economic Forum)
- Website: www.avgerinopoulou.gr

Dionysia-Theodora Avgerinopoulou (Greek: Διονυσία-Θεοδώρα Αυγερινοπούλου; born 10 September 1975) is a Greek politician and lawyer specialising in international, environmental, and sustainable development law. She is the recipient of the Green Star Award awarded by UNEP, OCHA, and Green Cross International for her leadership in prevention, preparedness and response to environmental emergencies.

Avgerinopoulou served as a Member of the Hellenic Parliament from 2009 to 2015 and from 2019 to present. She has served as the Deputy Secretary of Volunteer and NGOs for the New Democracy (Greece) Party and as the Deputy Head of the Environmental Policy Sector. During her tenure, she was elected ten times as the Chairperson of the Special Permanent Parliamentary Committee on Environmental Protection and the Subcommittee of the Water Resources. She is leading parliamentary work on environmental legislation, water management, climate policy, and disaster resilience. She has also served on several standing parliamentary committees, including those on foreign affairs, justice, economic affairs, and education. She also held the position of Chair of the Standing Permanent Parliamentary Committee on National Defense and Foreign Affairs.

== Early life ==
She was born in Patras, Achaea, Greece, and grew up in Zacharo, a town close to Ancient Olympia in south-western Greece, in Elis. She holds a (LL.B. equivalent) from the Law Faculty of the National and Kapodistrian University of Athens and a Master of Laws (LL.M.) in International Legal Studies, with distinction from the Georgetown University Law Center in Washington, D.C. and a J.S.D. (Ph.D. in law) in International Environmental Law from Columbia University Law School in New York, N.Y.

== Career ==
Avgerinopoulou is a specialized attorney in Public International Law, Climate and Environmental Law, International Finance Law, International Organizations and European Union Law, with experience at the Legal Service of the European Commission in Brussels, Belgium. Avgerinopoulou has worked as a researcher at the Yale Center for Environmental Law and Policy on legal and policy research on Global Environmental Governance issues, the Yale Law School on International Environmental Law issues, good governance and corruption, and the Center for Environmental and Land Use Law of the New York University School of Law.. In March 2010, Avgerinopoulou was assigned Deputy Secretary of Volunteerism and NGOs for the New Democracy Party and held this position until January 2011, when she was appointed as the Deputy Head of the Environmental Policy Sector of the New Democracy Party.

Avgerinopoulou has been elected as a Member of the Hellenic Parliament four times (2009-2012, 2012-2015, 2019–2023, 2023-2027) and represents the Prefecture of Elis (Ilia and Olympia), while from 2009 to 2011, she was a Member of the Hellenic Parliament "at large" (Constituency: State, in Greek: "βουλευτής Επικρατείας".) Avgerinopoulou is serving as the Chairperson of the Special Permanent Committee for Environmental Protection and the Subcommittee of the Water Resources of the Hellenic Parliament, as well as the National Defense and Foreign Affairs Committee. During her tenure, Dionysia-Theodora has focused on the financing of sustainable development; the efficient waste management and the development of a circular economy; the empowerment of the enforcement mechanisms of Environmental Law; the support of innovative technologies, including space technologies, for the protection of the natural environment; the promotion of renewable energy sources; the mitigation and adaptation of climate change and the support of innovative technologies, the water management, the ocean protection, the nexus between environment, agriculture, and food; the nexus between environment and public health, and the sound management of water resources. She also led deliberations on the ratification of major multilateral agreements before the Parliament, while she represented the Parliament at major international environmental conferences.

In 2024, Avgerinopoulou was appointed as the Greek Prime Minister's Envoy for the Ocean. She coordinated Greece’s preparation and successful hosting of the 9th Our Ocean Conference (2024), co-leading the Intergovernmental Steering Committee for two years and contributing to the achievement of USD 11.3 billion in global commitments. She oversaw the follow-up of Greece’s 21 national commitments. She advised on major national positions on ocean governance, while she still represents Greece in high-level international fora on the ocean, blue economy, and climate–ocean diplomacy.

In 2015, Avgerinopoulou was elected at the Steering Committee of the Global Water Partnership Organization (GWPO) in recognition of her previous successful leadership in water issues, as well as her experience to co-operate with international, regional and national arrangements in sustainable water management, in order to create solutions to water issues at all levels and also opportunities for sustainable development. Avgerinopoulou also served as a Member of the Audit and Finance Subcommittee of the GWPO. At the same time, her vision within the Organization was the promotion and realization of the relevant Sustainable Development Goals No 6 and 14.

She has also held senior political positions within the Inter-Parliamentary Union (IPU), including Vice-President of the Executive Committee on behalf of the Twelve Plus Group, contributing to the organization's decision-making and strategy.

In 2014, she was elected Chairperson of the United Nations Affairs Committee of the Inter-Parliamentary Union (IPU). In this position, Avgerinopoulou participated in high-level meetings at the UN, including meetings with the UN Secretary-General and the Head of the Parliaments. At the same time, she cc-presided meetings on behalf of the IPU with the participation of the UN Deputy Secretary-General. Avgerinopoulou represented the IPU on many UN Agenda topics and was an advocate for the Sustainable Development Goals (SDGs). Avgerinopoulou has also been instrumental about promoting the SDGs from the very beginning through various other institutions and networks, first and foremost through the special Task Force on the SDGs of the Young Global Leaders of the World Economic Forum. She has also previously worked as an advisor at the European Union Delegation to the United Nations in New York, dealing mainly with the environment and sustainable development agendas.

In 2012, she was first elected as the Chairperson of the Circle of the Mediterranean Parliamentarians on Sustainable Development (COMPSUD), a position that she held for five years, while she was reelected at the shame position in 2025. Leading a dynamic network of Parliamentarians, members of the Environment Committees of twenty-six countries around the Mediterranean Sea, Avgerinopoulou put a special emphasis on efforts for the de-pollution of the Mediterranean, the combat against marine litter, and especially micro-plastics; she actively participated in dialogues for the destruction of the chemical weapons of Syria, while she tackled issues of climate change adaptation, with an emphasis on the vulnerable coastal and forest areas. Along with the MedPartnership, UNEP/MAP, the GWP and Horizon2020 projects, COMPSUD furthers the goals of the Integrated Coastal Zone Management (ICZM) and the Integrated Water Resources Management (IWRM).

In 2011, Avgerinopoulou was appointed as the Deputy Head of the Environmental Policy Sector ("Shadow" Deputy Minister for the Environment) of the New Democracy Party in Greece.

As the Deputy Head, she substantially contributed to the Party's strategic planning on environmental policies by adopting a large-scale systems and holistic approach. She led the deliberations of environmental bills in the Parliament on behalf of the Party. She also led initiatives and campaigns, with a special emphasis on environmental education and volunteerism. She also served as the Deputy Secretary of Volunteerism and NGOs, where she worked closely with civil society representatives at the country level on various initiatives.

She is a co-founder and executive director of the European Institute of Law, Science & Technology (EILST), a European non-governmental organization (NGO) aiming at building bridges between legal experts and scientists in the fields of environment, energy, telecommunications, space, biosciences, and intellectual property. Apart from the supervision of the "knowledge management" function of the institute, Avgerinopoulou effectively manages the Institute assuming overall responsibility for its functioning, while she sets the policy guidelines, oversees the project management functions of the institute, and coordinates environmental and renewable resources projects with local authorities (Regions). Further, she belongs to the Young Global Leaders of the World Economic Forum, as well as to the 40 Under 40 Young European Leaders of the EU under the age of 40.

== Education ==
Avgerinopoulou received a first degree in law (LL.B.) from the Faculty of Law of the National and Kapodistrian University of Athens, Greece, with distinction, and an LL.M. in International Legal Studies from the Georgetown University Law Center in Washington, D.C., with distinction. She also holds a Doctorate in Juridical Science (J.S.D.) with specialization in International Environmental Law and International Institutions from the Columbia University School of Law in New York, NY.

During her studies, Avgerinopoulou has been the recipient of many awards and scholarships, most notably including a Fulbright scholarship, an Alexander S. Onassis scholarship, and a NATO scholarship. She has also extensively taught and published in the fields of Public International Law, European Union Law, and Environmental Law.

She speaks Greek, English, French, and German.

== Social contribution and awards ==
Avgerinopoulou has devoted an important part of her pro bono work to humanitarian and environmental goals, including the prevention of anthropogenic and natural disasters, the post-disaster management, and relief and reconstruction efforts. She took the lead in the reconstruction of the Southwestern Peloponnese, Greece, after the wildfires in 2007 and secured international assistance for the region. Avgerinopoulou has also been active in a series of relief and reconstruction efforts after the occurrence of disasters worldwide, such as after the earthquake in, the wildfires in Haifa, Israel, and the nuclear accident in Fukushima, Japan.

In recognition of her efforts, she was presented with the "Global Citizenship Award for Leadership in Assisting Humanity" by "Orphans International Worldwide" in 2010, while in 2011, she received the "Green Star" Award by UNEP/OCHA and Green Cross International.

Avgerinopoulou has been selected as a Young Global Leader of the World Economic Forum (WEF), under which she participates in various task forces, including the Task Force on Decarbonization, in order to combat climate change, and the Task Force for the Sustainable Development Goals. She has also been elected as one of the "40 Under 40" of the EU, namely among the forty most promising leaders of the European Union under the age of 40. She has been presented with, among others, the Blue Planet Award, the Agni Vlavianos Award by the Club of Rome, and the Global Women Leaders Award.

In 2010, she received a U.S. Special Congressional Recognition for her "outstanding efforts and invaluable contributions on behalf of Hellenic Students and the environment" by the She has been the recipient of the international "Goddess Artemis Award" by the Euro-American Women's Council for her contribution to transatlantic cooperation between the and the EU institutions on environmental and climate change issues. She has also been among the candidates for the "Women of Europe Award". She has been voted as the first alternative nominee for the United Nations Hamilton Shirley Amerasinghe Memorial Fellowship on the Law of the Sea.

Avgerinopoulou is an active member of many civil society and academic organizations, such as the Network of Women Ministers and Leaders for the Environment, the Hellenic Association for Environmental Law, the Climate Parliament, the Biopolitics International Organization, the Academic Council on the United Nations System, and the American Society of International Law.
