= Notis Marias =

Greek politician

Nótis Mariás MEP
- Νότης Μαριάς
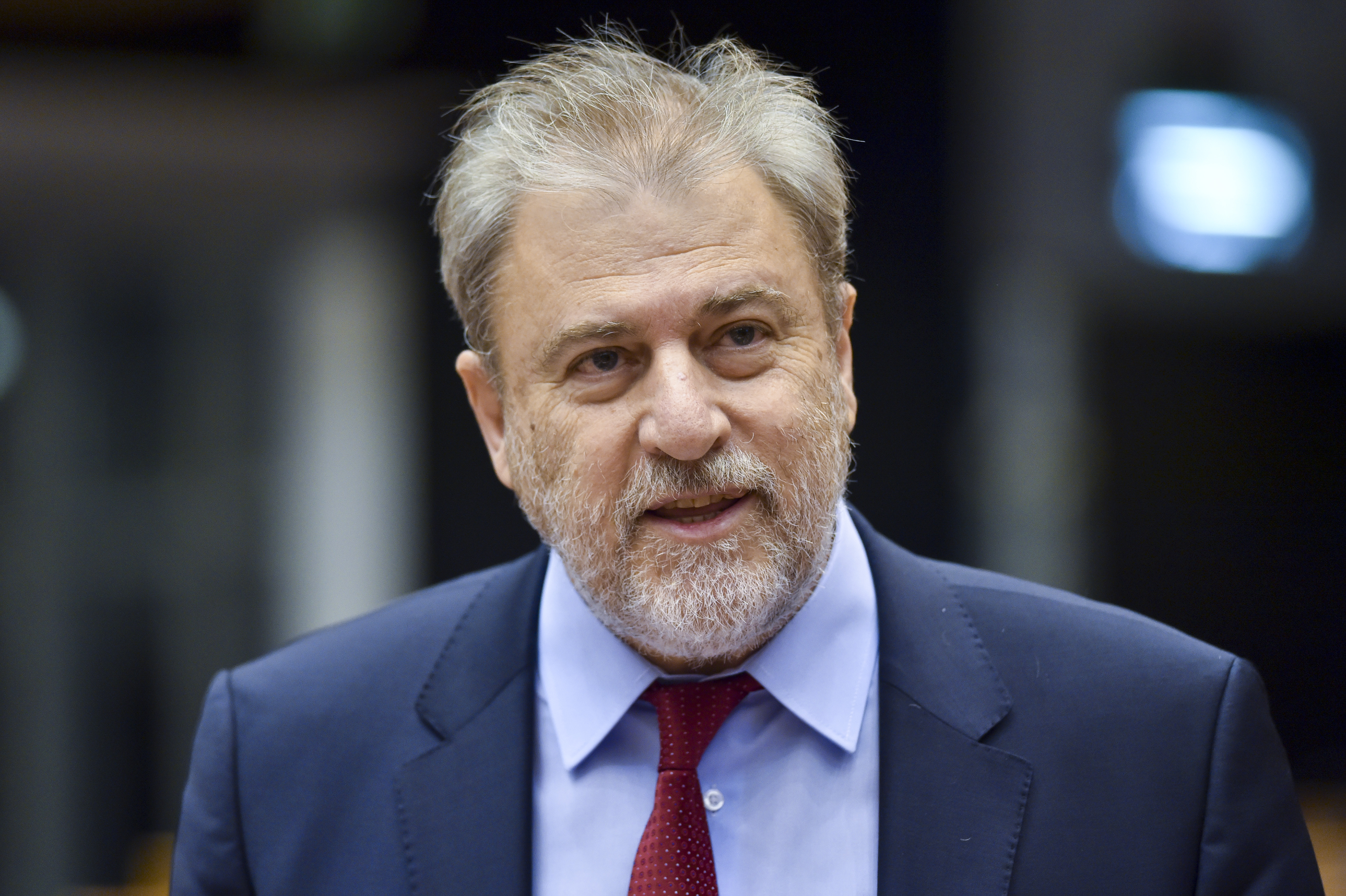

Member of the European Parliament for Greece
- In office 25 May 2014 – 2 July 2019

Member of the Hellenic Parliament for Heraklion
- In office 6 May 2012 – 2 May 2014
- Succeeded by: Constantine Damavolitis

Personal details
- Born: Epaminóndas Mariás (Greek: Επαμεινώνδας Μαριάς); 5 April 1957 (age 69) Thessaloniki, Greece
- Party: ANEL (until 2014); Independent (since 2014)
- Education: University of Athens; London School of Economics; Panteion University
- Website: notismarias.gr

Epaminóndas "Nótis" Mariás (Greek: Επαμεινώνδας (Νότης) Μαριάς; born 5 April 1957) is a Greek political scientist, politician, and Member of the European Parliament (MEP). He is a former member of the Independent Greeks and sits in the European Conservatives and Reformists group in the European Parliament, of which he is one of the three Vice-Chairmen.

Marias was elected to the Hellenic Parliament at the May 2012 election, representing Heraklion in Crete. He was re-elected a month later, again representing Heraklion. Marias was elected to the European Parliament at the 2014 election, at which the Independent Greeks won 3.5% of the vote: entitling them to one MEP.

Before his election to Parliament, Marias was a Professor in the Department of Economics at the University of Crete. He holds a BA in Law from the National and Kapodistrian University of Athens, an LL.M in Law from the London School of Economics, and a Ph.D in Political and Social Sciences from Panteion University.
