= Konstantinos Barbarousis =

Greek politician (born 1980)

Konstantinos Barbarousis (Greek: Κωνσταντίνος Μπαρμπαρούσης; Machairas, Astakos, 30 October 1980) is a far-right Greek politician, member of the Greek Parliament for Golden Dawn from May 2012 until June 2019.

In 2018, from the floor of the parliament, Barbarousis called for the military to "respect their oath" and arrest Prime Minister Alexis Tsipras, Minister of National Defence Panos Kammenos, and President Prokopis Pavlopoulos "in order to prevent this high treason" about the Prespa agreement that was due to be reached, that was seen as giving out the name "Macedonia". The government of the time reacted to it as a call for a military coup, and a treason investigation was opened against him.

After his speech, Barbousis was expelled from the party and from parliament.

At the time of his speech, protests had already happened in and out of the country against the Prespa agreement, and there were instances of conflict between protesters and anti-riot units.
