= Antonis Bezas =

Greek politician

Antonis Bezas (Greek: Αντώνης Μπέζας; Igoumenitsa, born 1964) is a Greek politician.

== Biography ==
He was born in 1964 in Igoumenitsa. He studied civil engineering in the National Technical University of Athens.

He was member of parliament for Thesprotia with New Democracy from 2000 to 2015 and acted as Deputy Minister of Finance from October 2005 to October 2009.

In the cabinet of Antonis Samaras he acted as Deputy Minister of Health from 24 June 2013 to 9 June 2014 and as Deputy Minister of Health, Social Insurance and Welfare from 9 Ιουνίου 2014 to 26 January 2015.
