= Dimitris Kremastinos =

Greek doctor, university teacher, and politician (1942–2020)

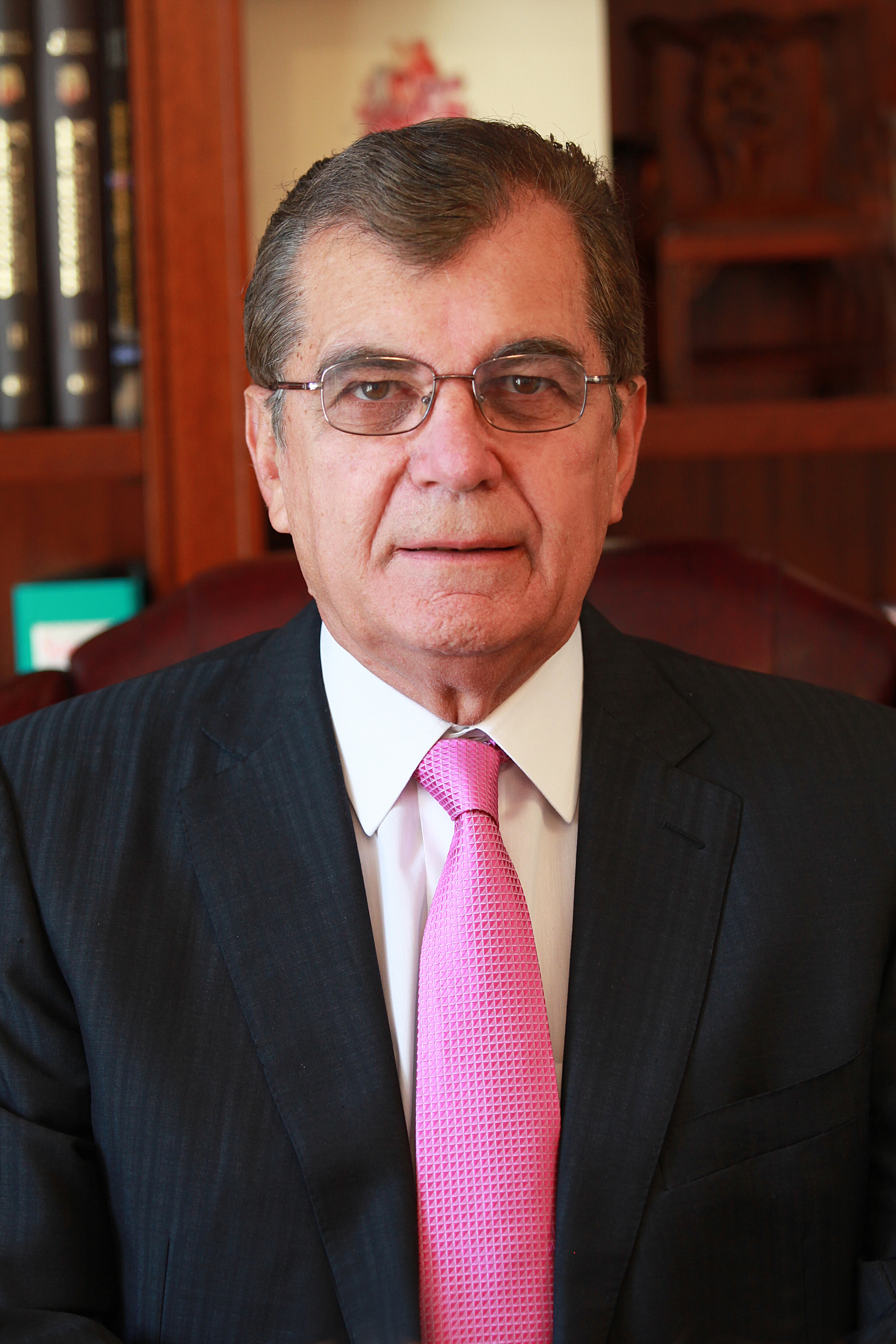

Dimitris Kremastinos (Greek: Δημήτρης Κρεμαστινός; Greece, 1 May 1942 – 8 May 2020) was a Greek politician, physician, Professor of Cardiology at the National and Kapodistrian University of Athens, and member of the European Academy of Sciences and Arts.

== Life ==
He had served as Minister of Health and Welfare and Social Security from 1993 to 1996.

In 2000, Kremastinos was elected as a member of the Hellenic Parliament, where he served till 2004 and in 2009 was elected once again, serving till 2019. He was elected MP of the Dodecanese with PASOK and the Democratic Alignment. He was the personal physician of Andreas Papandreou.

== Death ==
On 26 March 2020, he was admitted to the Evangelismos Hospital in Athens, due to a severe infection with COVID-19 during the COVID-19 pandemic in Greece. He died at the hospital on 8 May 2020.
