= Aris Spiliotopoulos =

Greek politician (born 1966)

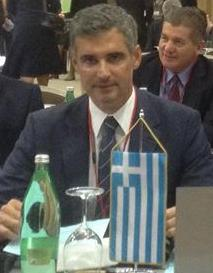
Aris Spiliotopoulos

Aris Spiliotopoulos (Greek: Άρης Σπηλιωτόπουλος; born 28 October 1966) is a Greek politician of the New Democracy party. He served as Minister for Tourism (2007–2009) and Minister for National Education and Religious Affairs from January to October 2009.

He was born in Patras.

He was first elected to the Greek Parliament on the statewide ticket in 2000. In 2004 he was elected for the Athens B constituency, and he was re-elected in 2007.

Preceded by Fani Palli-Petralia	Minister for Tourism; 2007–2009	Succeeded by Kostas Markopoulos
Preceded by Evripidis Stylianidis	Minister for National Education and Religious Affairs; 2009	Succeeded by Anna Diamantopoulou
