= Eleni Gerasimidou =

Greek actress and politician

- Ελένη Γερασιμίδου
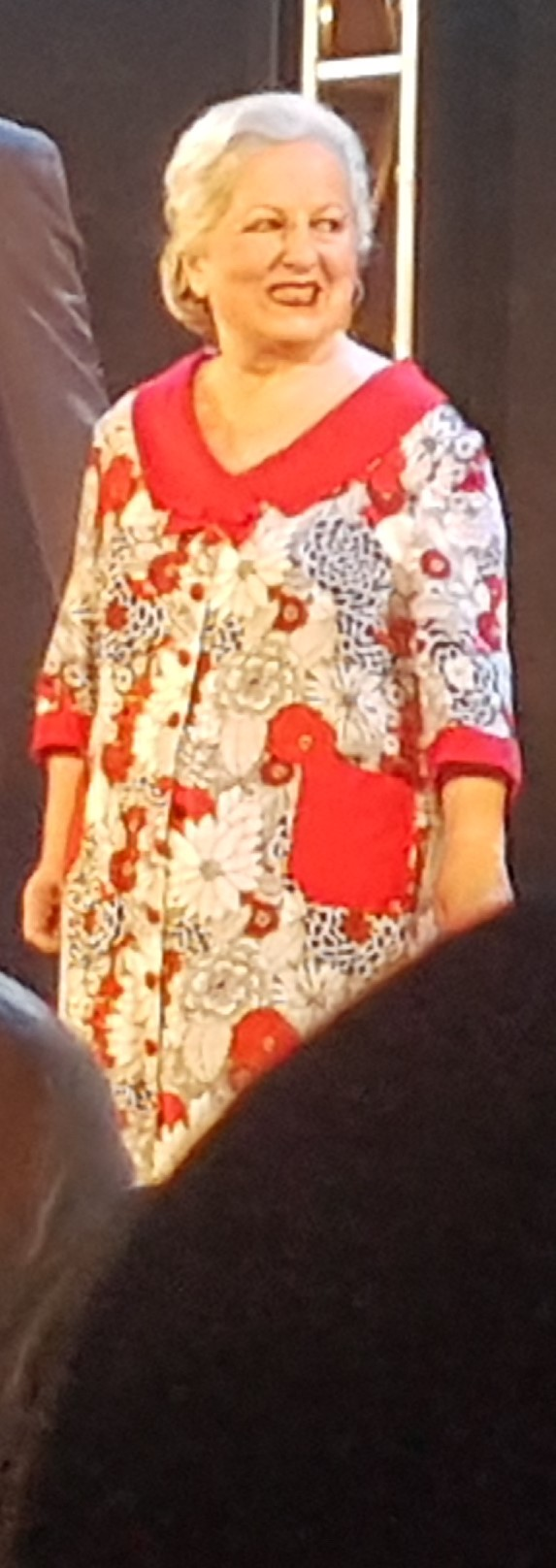
- Born: December 11, 1949 (age 76); Panorama, Thessaloniki, Macedonia, Greece
- Occupations: Actress, politician, director
- Years active: 1980-present
- Political party: Communist Party of Greece
- Spouse: Antonis Xenos (1981-present)
- Children: 1
- Relatives: Natasa & Giorgos (siblings); Christina & Lawson Jackson (nieces); Chris Jackson (brother-in-law)

Eleni Gerasimidou is a Greek actress and politician.

== Biography ==
In the elections of May and June 2012, as well as in January 2015, she was elected as a member of parliament with the KKE in the electoral district of 2nd Thessaloniki. She was also elected in the 2019 elections in the 1st district of East Attica, however she resigned and the seat was taken by Giannis Gkiokas. In the elections of May and June 2023, she again ran for office in East Attica., without being elected.

In the 2024 European elections, Eleni Gerasimidou was a candidate for MEP with the KKE (she was not elected).
