= Spyros Taliadouros =

Greek politician

Spyridon "Spyros" Taliadouros (Greek: Σπυρίδων "Σπύρος" Ταλιαδούρος) (born 26 March 1956) is a Greek politician who served as New Democracy member of the Hellenic Parliament for Karditsa. He was educated at the University of Athens (Bachelor's, 1980; PhD, 1986) and King's College London (Master's, 1981).
