= Mimis Androulakis =

Greek author and politician

Mimis Androulakis Μίμης Ανδρουλάκης MP
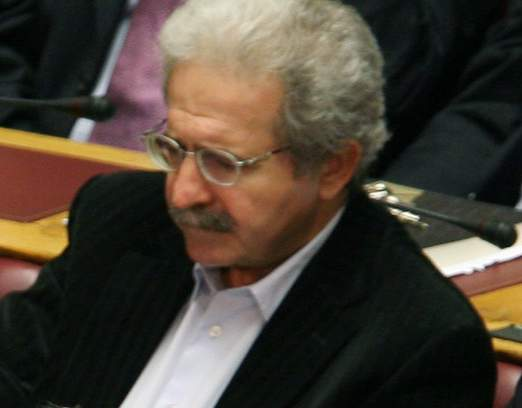

Member of the Hellenic Parliament
- In office June 18, 1989 – September 11, 1993
- In office March 7, 2004 – November 6, 2013

Personal details
- Born: 24 November 1951 (age 74) Agios Nikolaos, Crete, Greece
- Party: Panhellenic Socialist Movement
- Education: National Technical University of Athens

Dimitris (Mimis) Androulakis (Greek: Δημήτρης (Μίμης) Ανδρουλάκης) (born 24 November 1951 in Agios Nikolaos, Crete) is a Greek author and politician.

He was elected MP with SYN in 1989, and later with PASOK in 2004. In the 2004 elections, he was elected by statewide list, but for the following three elections represented the Athens B constituency.

== Early life ==
He was born on 24 November 1951 in Agios Nikolaos, which was then part of the Kingdom of Greece.

As a student in the National Technical University of Athens, he was actively involved in the antidictatorial struggle and took part in the Athens Technical University uprising as a member of the organizational students' committee. He studied in the Department of Agronomists-Surveyors.

Afterward, he became a close associate of Charilaos Florakis. In the 1984-85 period, he became a member of the Political Bureau of the KKE and was responsible for the press and publications. After the 1984 European Parliament election, which was met with a negative result for the KKE, he proposed a change of the party line, which changed the party from being the anti-right line and instead condemned what he stated was the two-party system. He also advocated for the slogan of the "coalition of the left" for the party.

== Political career ==
He was deputy member of the Central Committee of the Communist Party of Greece until 1991 when he resigned to join Synaspismos. He stopped his active involvement in politics in 1993 and appeared again in 2004 after accepting George Papandreou's offer to join PASOK's lists.

He has written 11 novels and many political books. His book M^{ν} (in Greek read as "mi eis ti(n) ni" alluding to the word "mouni" -"pussy" in Greek) which portrays Jesus Christ as a philanderer who finds it hard to resist Mary Magdalene triggered the Greek Orthodox Church's reactions and several copies of the book were set on fire in Thessaloniki by Christians who found the book's contents offensive.
