= Georgios Orfanos =

Greek politician

Georgios Orfanos (Greek: Γιώργος Ορφανός) is a Greek politician with the New Democracy party, a former minister and member of the Greek Parliament since 1996.

He was born in Thessaloniki on 11 June 1953, and he is a Civil-Mechanical Engineer graduated from the Aristotle University of Thessaloniki. He was elected in the first district of Thessaloniki for New Democracy in 1996 for the first time, and was reelected in 2000, 2004, 2007 and 2012. From 2004 to 2007 he has occupied the position of Deputy Minister for Sports. During his tenure, Greece hosted the Athens 2004 Olympic Games In the 2010 New Democracy conference elected member of the New Democracy political member. Between 2014 and 2015 he was the Minister of Macedonia and Thrace for the collaboration administration of Antonis Samaras

Orfanos is married with Meropi Karantali and they have three children.
