= Messenia (constituency) =

Electoral district of Greece

- Constituency for the Hellenic Parliament
- Messenia within the Peloponnese region

- Peloponnese region within Greece
- Regional Unit: Messenia
- Region: Peloponnese
- Electorate: 204,963 (May 2012)

Current constituency
- Number of members: Five

Messenia is a constituency in Peloponnese represented in the Hellenic Parliament. It elects five Members of Parliament (MPs) by the Reinforced proportional representation system of election. It comprises the Messenia Prefecture.

Its most high-profile MP is the former Prime Minister, Antonis Samaras of the New Democracy Party.

== Election results ==
=== Legislative election ===
Messinia constituency results

Election	1st party	2nd party	3rd party	4th party	5th party	source
May 2012	New Democracy 33.60%	PASOK 13.74%	SYRIZA 13.33%	XA 8.16%	KKE 7.33%	
June 2012	New Democracy 41.59%	SYRIZA 21.55%	PASOK 11.65%	XA 7.76%	DIMAR 4.40%	
January 2015	New Democracy 37.96%	SYRIZA 31.76%	XA 7.20%	KKE 4.93%	PASOK 4.29%	
September 2015	New Democracy 35.45%	SYRIZA 30.51%	XA 8.10%	PASOK 5.93%	KKE 5.43%	
2019	New Democracy 44.37%	SYRIZA 30.66%	PASOK 6.85%	KKE 4.69%	EL 3.35%	
May 2023	New Democracy 44.27%	SYRIZA 20.98%	PASOK 10.97%	KKE 6.75%	EL 3.98%	
June 2023	New Democracy 43.71%	SYRIZA 17.50%	PASOK 11.14%	KKE 7.44%	EL 5.96%	

== Members of Parliament ==
=== Current members ===
- Petros Konstantineas SYRIZA
- Panagiota Kozompoli-Amanatidi SYRIZA
- Georgios Katrougalos SYRIZA
- Antonis Samaras ND
- Dimitrios Koukoutsis XA

=== Members (Jan 2015 – Sep 2015) ===
- Petros Konstantineas SYRIZA
- Panagiota Kozompoli-Amanatidi SYRIZA
- Athanasios Petrakos SYRIZA
- Eleni Psarrea SYRIZA
- Antonis Samaras ND

=== Members of Parliament (2012–2015) ===
- Antonis Samaras ND
- Ioannis Lampropoulos ND
- Dimitrios Sampaziotis ND
- Athanasios Petrakos SYRIZA
- Dimitrios Koukoutsis XA
