= Independent Greeks =

Independent Greeks Ανεξάρτητοι Έλληνες
- Abbreviation: ANEL
- President: Panos Kammenos
- General Secretary: Kostas Karabelas
- Spokesperson: Theodoros Tosounidis
- Founded: 24 February 2012; 14 years ago
- Dissolved: c. 2021
- Split from: New Democracy
- Headquarters: 196, Syngrou Ave. 176 71 Athens
- Ideology: National conservatism; Social conservatism; Euroscepticism
- Political position: Right-wing
- Religion: Greek Orthodox
- European Parliament group: European Conservatives and Reformists Group (2014)
- Colours: Blue, red
- Slogan: We are many— We are independent— We are Greeks

The Independent Greeks – National Patriotic Alliance (Greek: Ανεξάρτητοι Έλληνες (ΑΝΕΛ), Anexartitoi Ellines, ANEL) was a national conservative political party in Greece.

The party was the junior coalition partner to the Coalition of the Radical Left (Syriza) in the first and second Tsipras governments, from January 2015 until the June 2019 parliamentary election, in which the party did not participate.

== History ==
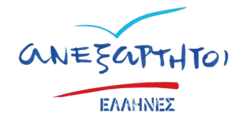
The party's former logo (used from 2012 to 2019)

The party was created on 24 February 2012 by Panos Kammenos, a former Member of Parliament (MP) for the conservative party New Democracy (ND). Kammenos had been expelled from the New Democracy parliamentary group after voting against Lucas Papademos' coalition government in a vote of confidence. The party's founding declaration was issued on 11 March 2012. Ten former ND deputies were founding members of the party, namely Elena Kountoura, Christos Zois, Kostas Markopoulos, Dimitrios G. Stamatis, Spyros Galinos, Mika Iatridi, Maria Kollia-Tsaroucha, Panagiotis Melas and Michalis Giannakis

On 17 April 2012, the small left-wing anti-bailout party Panhellenic Citizen Chariot reached an election cooperation agreement with the Independent Greeks.

Prior to the May 2012 legislative election, the party had 11 MPs: 10 defectors from New Democracy and one from Panhellenic Socialist Movement (PASOK).

The party won 10.6% of the vote and 33 MPs in the parliamentary election in May 2012. In the snap June 2012 legislative election, ANEL received 7.5% of the vote, which reduced the party's representation to 20 MPs.

In the 2014 European Parliament election held on 25 May 2014, ANEL received 3.5% of the vote, electing a single MEP who sat with the European Conservatives and Reformists (ECR) group. The MEP, Notis Marias, left ANEL, however, and became an independent member of the ECR group.

In the January 2015 legislative election held on 25 January 2015, ANEL received 4.75% of the vote and returned 13 MPs to the Hellenic Parliament. On 26 January 2015, ANEL agreed to form a governing coalition with the Coalition of the Radical Left.

The second election of the year, the September 2015 legislative election on 20 September 2015, returned ANEL to parliament with 10 seats from 3.69% of the vote. Syriza again agreed to form a coalition government with ANEL, with the returning cabinet sworn in on 21 September.

On 13 January 2019, Defence Minister Panos Kammenos and the Independent Greeks withdrew from Greece's ruling coalition over a deal struck on the Macedonia naming dispute, potentially leaving the governing coalition without a workable majority in parliament. However, the government was able to survive the confidence vote thanks to some ANEL dissidents.

On 9 June 2019, party leader Panos Kammenos announced ANEL would not participate in the 2019 parliamentary election. ANEL did not run in the May 2023 or the June 2023 Greek legislative elections either.

== Ideology ==
The party has been described as conservative, national conservative, social conservative, right-wing populist, Greek nationalist, Eurosceptic, and right-wing.

The party called for revoking the first and second memorandums, loan agreements between Greece, the EU and the International Monetary Fund. Further, it considers the agreements illegal and calls for lifting immunity from and then investigating and prosecuting Greek ministers, parliamentarians, and officials who negotiated the agreements or who otherwise bear blame for Greece's economic crisis.

In opposing the memorandums negotiated with 'The Troika', party leader Kammenos said Greece had become a "laboratory animal" in an austerity experiment conducted by the IMF and EU, who "used the public debt as a means of control." Kammenos has focused much of his fire on Germany, stating that "Germany is not treating Greece as a partner but as its master. ... It tries to turn a Europe of independent states into a Europe dominated by Germany."

The party's official programme states it will repudiate part of Greece's debt because it was created by speculators in a conspiracy to bring Greece to the edge of bankruptcy. It announced in December 2012 that it would start working to create a patriotic Democratic Front, whose aim is to save "Greece from the neo-liberal avalanche."

The party also calls for German war reparations (for the invasion and occupation of Greece in the Second World War).

On social policy, Independent Greeks oppose multiculturalism and want to reduce immigration, and support development of a Christian Orthodox oriented education system.

According to The Independent, the party has "a socially right-wing stance, supporting patriotism and the role of the Greek Orthodox Church in family life and education".

== Election results ==
=== Hellenic Parliament ===
Election	Hellenic Parliament					Rank	Government	Leader
Election	Votes	%	±pp	Seats won	+/−	Rank	Government	Leader
May 2012	670,957	10.6%	New	33 / 300	▲33	#4	Opposition	Panos Kammenos
June 2012	462,406	7.5%	-3.1	20 / 300	▼13	#4	Opposition	Panos Kammenos
January 2015	293,683	4.8%	-2.7	13 / 300	▼7	#6	Coalition government SYRIZA-ANEL	Panos Kammenos
September 2015	200,423	3.7%	-1.1	10 / 300	▼3	#7	Coalition government SYRIZA-ANEL	Panos Kammenos
2019	Did not run	–	-3.7	0 / 300	▼10	–	extra-parliamentary	Panos Kammenos

=== European Parliament ===
European Parliament
Election	Votes	%	±pp	Seats won	+/−	Rank	Leader
2014	197,701	3.5%	New	1 / 21	▲1	#7	Panos Kammenos
2019	45,149	0.8%	-2.7	0 / 21	▼1	#15	Panos Kammenos

== Members of Parliament ==
The Independent Greeks most recently held three MPs in the 2015 (September)-2019 Hellenic Parliament:

Name	Constituency
Panagiotis (Panos) Kammenos	Athens B
Maria Kollia-Tsaroucha	Serres
Aristidis Fokas	Thessaloniki B

On 19 November 2015 Nikolaos Nikolopoulos was expelled from the Parliamentary Group of Independent Greeks.

On 16 June 2018 Dimitrios Kammenos was expelled from the party, because he voted to topple the government in a recent no confidence vote tabled by Official Opposition party New Democracy. On 26 June Georgios Lazaridis left his party's parliamentary group and declared himself independent citing opposition to the Greece-Republic of North Macedonia naming agreement signed on 17 June 2018, as the reason for leaving the party.

On 14 January 2019 Elena Kountoura and Vasilion Kokkalis were expelled from the party due to their continuing support for Tsipras government after Independent Greeks left it over the Prespa agreement dispute.

On 15 January 2019 Aristidis Fokas elected on the list of Union of Centrists joined Independent Greeks.
