= First cabinet of Kyriakos Mitsotakis =

Greece's New Democracy party government between 2019 and 2023

First Cabinet of Kyriakos Mitsotakis
- Cabinet of Greece

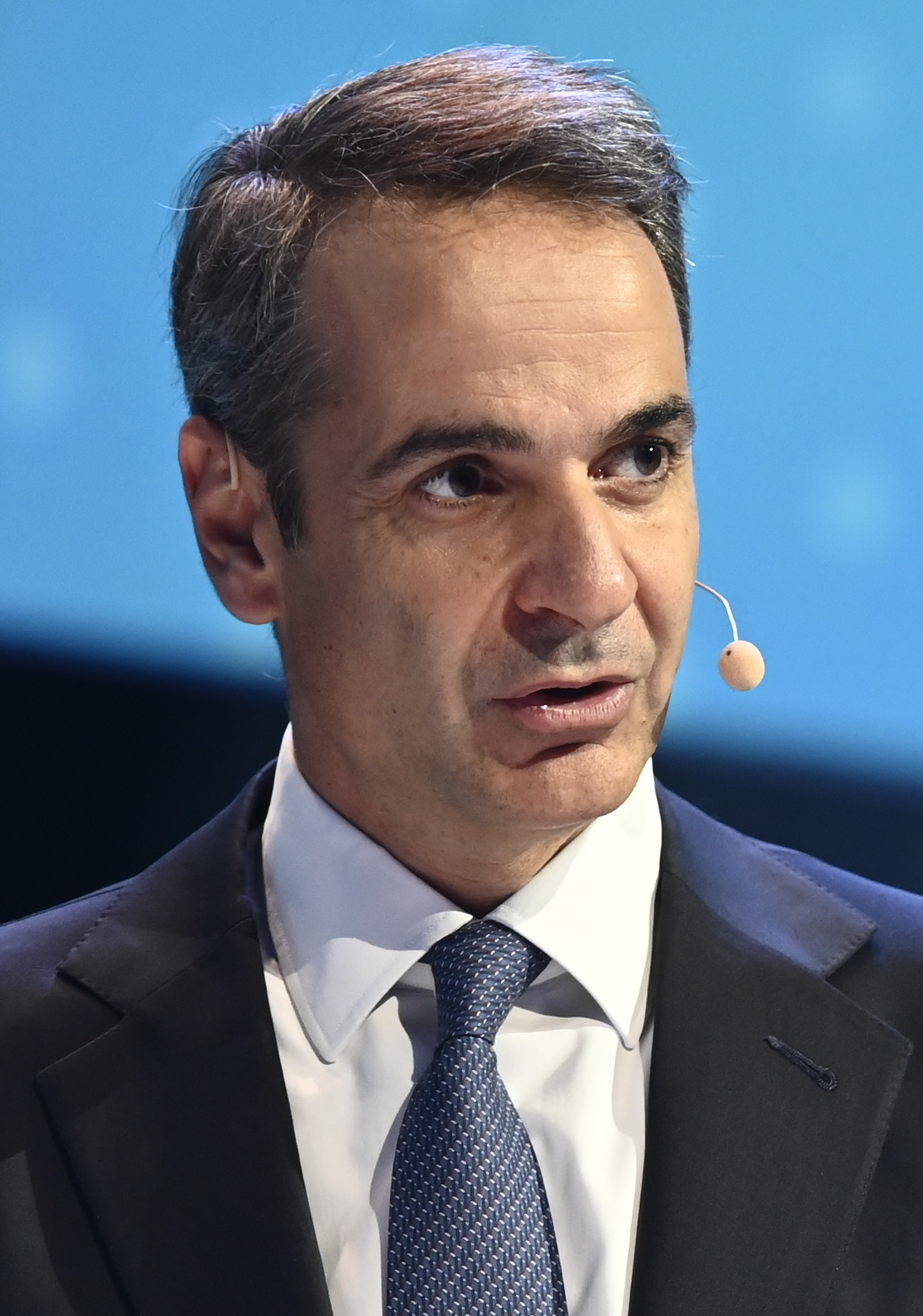
- Kyriakos Mitsotakis in 2019
- Date formed: 9 July 2019
- Date dissolved: 25 May 2023

People and organisations
- Head of state: Prokopis Pavlopoulos (until 13 March 2020); Katerina Sakellaropoulou (since 13 March 2020)
- Head of government: Kyriakos Mitsotakis
- Deputy head of government: Panagiotis Pikrammenos
- No. of ministers: 20
- Total no. of members: 58
- Member parties: New Democracy
- Status in legislature: Majority
- Opposition parties: Syriza; Movement for Change; Communist Party of Greece; Greek Solution; MeRA25
- Opposition leader: Alexis Tsipras

History
- Election: 2019 Greek legislative election
- Legislature term: 18th (2019–2023)
- Predecessor: Tsipras II
- Successor: Sarmas (caretaker)

The First Cabinet of Kyriakos Mitsotakis was sworn in on 9 July 2019, following the Greek legislative election in July 2019. Kyriakos Mitsotakis, leader of New Democracy, was sworn in as Prime Minister of Greece on 8 July.

The government consists of a total of 58 members, including 20 ministers, 5 alternate ministers and 31 deputy ministers. Of these, 35 are elected members of the Hellenic Parliament and 23 are unelected technocrats. Ten members of the government are women.

== Prime and Deputy Prime Ministers ==
Office	Incumbent	Party		In office since
**Prime Minister**	**Kyriakos Mitsotakis**	*	New Democracy	8 July 2019
Deputy Prime Minister	Panagiotis Pikrammenos	*	New Democracy	9 July 2019

=== Ministers ===
Full ministers (in bold in the table below) are responsible for:

- the identification of ministerial policy in the cabinet
- the representation in bodies of the European Union
- the appointment of administrative agencies, public services and personnel

Alternate Ministers are directly assigned special responsibilities and powers by the prime minister, including:

- full parliamentary powers and, in conjunction with the minister, the legislative initiative
- the right to issue individual and normative acts, and to propose individual and normative decrees

Deputy ministers are assigned with responsibilities and powers by the prime minister and the full minister they report to. Deputy ministers may attend cabinet meetings.

Ministry	Office	Incumbent	Party		In office since
**1.** Ministry of Finance	**Minister for Finance**	**Christos Staikouras**	*	New Democracy	9 July 2019
**1.** Ministry of Finance	Alternate Minister for Fiscal Policy	Theodoros Skylakakis		New Democracy	5 August 2020
**1.** Ministry of Finance	Deputy Minister for Tax Policy and Public Property	Apostolos Vesyropoulos	*	New Democracy	9 July 2019
**2.** Ministry of Development and Investment	**Minister for Development and Investment**	**Adonis Georgiadis**	*	New Democracy	9 July 2019
**2.** Ministry of Development and Investment	Alternate Minister for Private Investment	Nikos Papathanasis		New Democracy	5 August 2020
**2.** Ministry of Development and Investment	Deputy Minister for Public Investment and the Partnership Agreement for the Development Framework	Giannis Tsakiris			9 July 2019
**2.** Ministry of Development and Investment	Deputy Minister for Research and Innovation	Christos Dimas	*	New Democracy	9 July 2019
**3.** Ministry of Foreign Affairs	**Minister for Foreign Affairs**	**Nikos Dendias**	*	New Democracy	9 July 2019
**3.** Ministry of Foreign Affairs	Alternate Minister for European Affairs	Miltiadis Varvitsiotis	*	New Democracy	9 July 2019
**3.** Ministry of Foreign Affairs	Deputy Minister for Economic Diplomacy and Extroversion	Kostas Frangogiannis			9 July 2019
**3.** Ministry of Foreign Affairs	Deputy Minister for Greeks Abroad	Andreas Katsaniotis	*	New Democracy	31 August 2021
**4.** Ministry of Citizen Protection	**Minister for Citizen Protection**	**Takis Theodorikakos**	*	New Democracy	31 August 2021
**4.** Ministry of Citizen Protection	Deputy Minister for Anti-Crime Policy	Eleftherios Oikonomou			9 July 2019
**5.** Ministry of the Climate Crisis and Civil Protection	**Minister for the Climate Crisis and Civil Protection**	**Christos Stylianides**		Democratic Rally	10 September 2021
**5.** Ministry of the Climate Crisis and Civil Protection	Deputy Minister	Evangelos Tournas			10 September 2021
**6.** Ministry of National Defence	**Minister for National Defence**	**Nikolaos Panagiotopoulos**	*	New Democracy	9 July 2019
**6.** Ministry of National Defence	Deputy Minister	Nikos Hardalias		New Democracy	31 August 2021
**7.** Ministry of Education and Religious Affairs	**Minister for Education and Religious Affairs**	**Niki Kerameus**	*	New Democracy	9 July 2019
**7.** Ministry of Education and Religious Affairs	Deputy Minister for Primary, Secondary and Special Education	Zetta Makri	*	New Democracy	5 January 2021
**7.** Ministry of Education and Religious Affairs	Deputy Minister for Higher Education	Angelos Syrigos	*	New Democracy	5 January 2021
**8.** Ministry of Labour and Social Affairs	**Minister for Labour and Social Affairs**	**Kostis Hatzidakis**	*	New Democracy	5 January 2021
**8.** Ministry of Labour and Social Affairs	Deputy Minister for Social Security	Panagiotis Tsakloglou			5 August 2020
**8.** Ministry of Labour and Social Affairs	Deputy Minister for Welfare and Social Solidarity	Domna Michailidou		New Democracy	9 July 2019
**8.** Ministry of Labour and Social Affairs	Deputy Minister for Demographic Policy and the Family	Maria Syrengela		New Democracy	5 January 2021
**9.** Ministry of Health	**Minister for Health**	**Thanos Plevris**	*	New Democracy	31 August 2021
**9.** Ministry of Health	Alternate Minister for Health Services	Mina Gaga		New Democracy	31 August 2021
**9.** Ministry of Health	Deputy Minister for Mental Health	Zoi Rapti	*	New Democracy	5 August 2020
**10.** Ministry of the Environment and Energy	**Minister for the Environment and Energy**	**Kostas Skrekas**	*	New Democracy	5 January 2021
**10.** Ministry of the Environment and Energy	Deputy Minister for Environmental Protection	Giorgos Amyras	*	New Democracy	5 January 2021
**10.** Ministry of the Environment and Energy	Deputy Minister for Spatial Planning and the Urban Environment	Nikos Tagaras	*	New Democracy	5 January 2021
**11.** Ministry of Culture and Sports	**Minister for Culture and Sports**	**Lina Mendoni**			9 July 2019
**11.** Ministry of Culture and Sports	Deputy Minister for Modern Culture	Nicholas Yatromanolakis			5 January 2021
**11.** Ministry of Culture and Sports	Deputy Minister for Sports	Lefteris Avgenakis	*	New Democracy	9 July 2019
**12.** Ministry of Justice	**Minister for Justice**	**Kostas Tsiaras**	*	New Democracy	9 July 2019
**12.** Ministry of Justice	Deputy Minister for International Cooperation and Human Rights	Giorgos Kotsiras	*	New Democracy	5 January 2021
**13.** Ministry of the Interior	**Minister for the Interior** (caretaker)	**Calliope Spanou**			23 April 2023
**13.** Ministry of the Interior	Alternate Minister for Local Government	Stelios Petsas		New Democracy	5 January 2021
**13.** Ministry of the Interior	Deputy Minister for Macedonia and Thrace	Stavros Kalafatis	*	New Democracy	5 January 2021
**14.** Ministry of Digital Governance	**Minister of State** (de jure); **Minister for Digital Governance** (de facto)	**Kyriakos Pierrakakis**			9 July 2019
**14.** Ministry of Digital Governance	Deputy Minister for Telecommunications and the Land Registry	Theodoros Livanios		New Democracy	13 August 2021
**15.** Ministry of Infrastructure and Transport	**Minister of State** (de jure); **Minister for Infrastructure and Transport** (de facto)	**Giorgos Gerapetritis**	*	New Democracy	9 July 2019; 1 March 2023
**15.** Ministry of Infrastructure and Transport	Deputy Minister for Transport	Michalis Papadopoulos	*	New Democracy	31 August 2021
**15.** Ministry of Infrastructure and Transport	Deputy Minister for Infrastructure	Giorgos Karagiannis		New Democracy	31 August 2021
**16.** Ministry of Shipping and Island Policy	**Minister for Shipping and Island Policy**	**Ioannis Plakiotakis**	*	New Democracy	9 July 2019
**16.** Ministry of Shipping and Island Policy	Deputy Minister for the Shipping Industry	Kostas Katsafados	*	New Democracy	5 January 2021
**17.** Ministry of Rural Development and Food	**Minister for Rural Development and Food**	**Georgios Georgantas**	*	New Democracy	8 February 2022
**17.** Ministry of Rural Development and Food	Deputy Minister for the Common Agricultural Policy	Giorgos Stylios	*	New Democracy	13 August 2021
**17.** Ministry of Rural Development and Food	Deputy Minister for Fisheries Policy	Simos Kedikoglou	*	New Democracy	31 August 2021
**18.** Ministry of Tourism	**Minister for Tourism**	**Vasilis Kikilias**	*	New Democracy	31 August 2021
**18.** Ministry of Tourism	Deputy Minister for Tourism Education and Special Forms of Tourism	Sofia Zacharaki		New Democracy	5 January 2021
**19.** Ministry of Immigration and Asylum	**Minister for Immigration and Asylum**	**Notis Mitarachi**	*	New Democracy	15 January 2020
**19.** Ministry of Immigration and Asylum	Deputy Minister for Integration	Sofia Voultepsi	*	New Democracy	5 January 2021

=== Ministers of State ===
Office	Incumbent	Party		In office since
**Minister of State** for Government Coordination; Government spokesman	**Akis Skertsos**		New Democracy	13 August 2021; 21 April 2023
Deputy Minister to the Prime Minister	Giannis Bratakos		New Democracy	2 September 2022
Deputy Minister to the Prime Minister for State Aid and Recovery from Natural Disasters	Christos Triantopoulos		New Democracy	13 August 2021
Deputy Minister to the Prime Minister for Communications and Information	Giannis Oikonomou	*	New Democracy	13 August 2021
Consultant on International Issues and Relations with International Media	Aristotelia Peloni		New Democracy	21 April 2023

Note: An asterisk (*) indicates an elected member of the Hellenic Parliament.
