= Ministry of Migration and Asylum =

Government ministry of Greece

- Υπουργείο Μετανάστευσης και Ασύλου

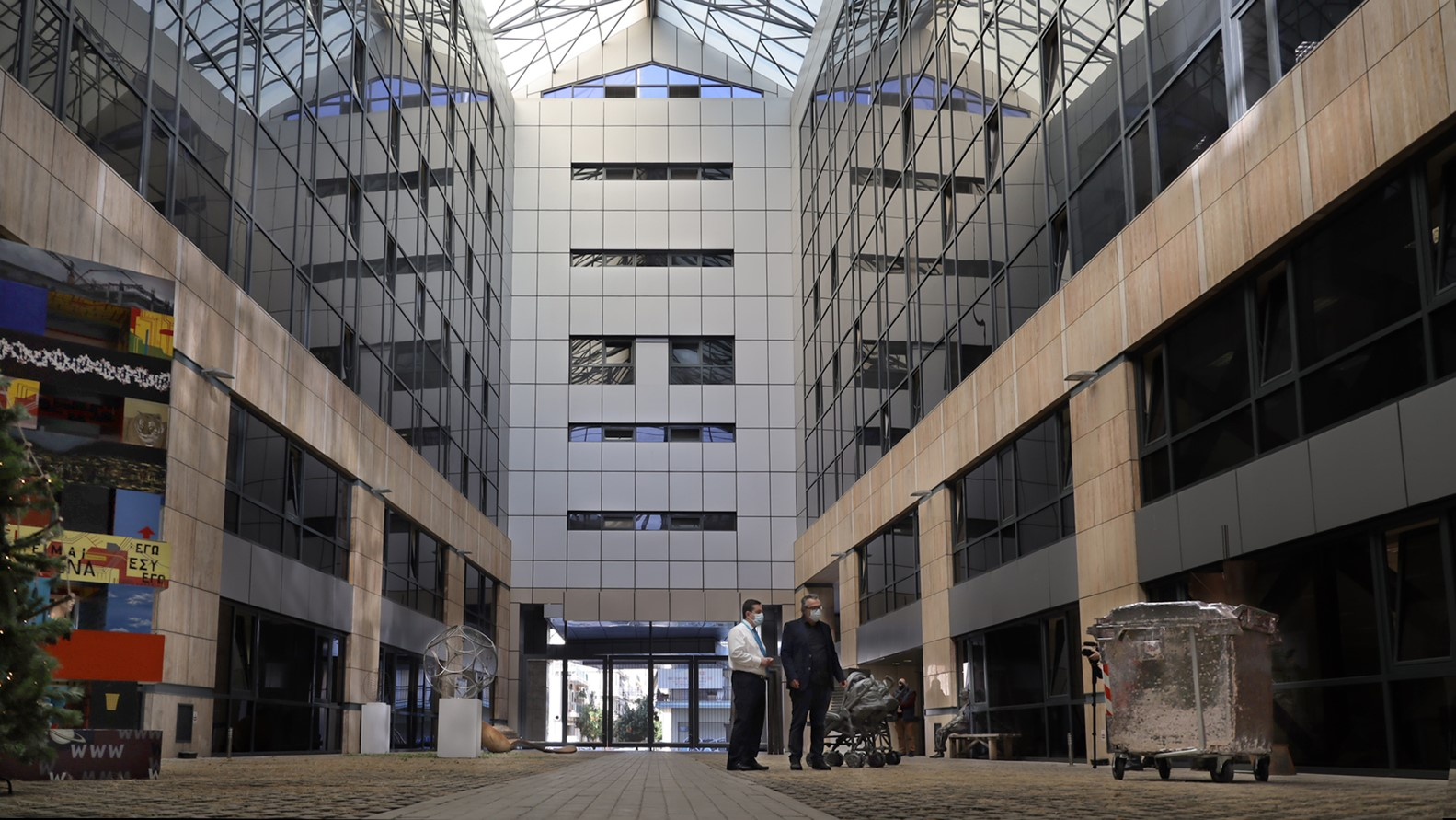
- Μinistry's headquarters in the Keranis building

Agency overview
- Formed: 15 January 2020
- Type: Ministry
- Jurisdiction: Government of Greece
- Status: active
- Headquarters: Agios Ioannis Renti, Piraeus; 37.96757°N 23.66215°E
- Employees: 1.103 2024
- Annual budget: 475.871.000 € 2025
- Minister responsible: Thanos Plevris
- Deputy minister responsible: Sevi Voloudaki
- Child agencies: Secretariat-General of Migration Policy; Secretariat-General for Reception of Asylum Seekers; Secretariat-General for Vulnerable Individuals & Institutional Protection
- Key document: the presidential decree establishing the ministry
- Website: migration.gov.gr/en/

The Ministry of Migration and Asylum is the official government body that oversees migration and asylum policy issues in Greece. It also contributes and implements European policies on Migration. It collaborates with the European Union Agency for Asylum, the International Organization for Migration and the United Nations. It receives funding from the Asylum, Migration and Integration Fund, the Internal Security Fund and the European Recovery and Resilience Fund.

Since 30 June 2025, the incumbent minister is Thanos Plevris. Since 15 March 2025, the deputy minister, responsible for issues of social integration, is Sevi Voloudaki.

== History ==
- On 4 November 2016, with the Presidential Decree 123/2016, the Ministry of Migration Policy was created out of the former Ministry of the Interior and Administrative Reorganization.
- On 8 July 2019, with the Presidential Decree 81/2019, the Ministry of Migration Policy was absorbed by the Ministry of Citizen Protection.
- On 15 January 2020, with the Presidential Decree 4/2020, the Ministry of Migration and Asylum was created when the General Secretariat of Migration Policy, Reception and Asylum was removed from the Ministry of Citizen Protection and its functions transferred to the new government department.
- On 23 January 2020, with the Presidential Decree 106/2020, the organizational structure of the Ministry of Migration and Asylum was drawn up.

== Administrative Services ==
=== Secretariat-General of Migration Policy ===
The General Secretariat of Migration Policy was established in 2010 with Article 1 of the Presidential Decree 11/2010 (16.02.10 Α’15). Following a series of administrative changes, the Secretariat was re-established in 2020 with the Presidential Decree 18/2020 (Α34).The General Secretariat participates in the planning and implementation of national and European policies for migration, oversees international protection policies by examining asylum applications, and promotes the social integration of third-country nationals in Greece. According to the Presidential Decree 106/2020, the Secretariat-General of Migration Policy oversees the Directorate-General of Migration Policy, the Appeals Authority, Directorate–General for the Coordination and Management of Migration and Home Affairs Funds and the Asylum Service

=== Secretariat-General for Reception of Asylum Seekers ===
The Secretariat-General for Reception of Asylum Seekers was established by the first article of the Presidential Decree 18/2020 (Government Gazette 34/Issue Α’/19-02-2020). The Reception and Identification Service (previously named First Reception Service according to Law 3907/2011) was established with Law Ν.4375/2016 (Government Gazette 51/Issue Α’/ 03-04-2016) and operates under the Secretariat-General for Reception of Asylum Seekers. The Reception and Identification Service is responsible for the reception and identification procedures for third-country nationals who enter Greece without the lawful requirements.

=== Secretariat-General for Vulnerable Individuals & Institutional Protection ===
The Secretariat Special for the Protection of Unaccompanied Minors was established in paragraph 3 of the first article of the Presidential Decree 18/2020. It operates according to Articles 35 and 42 of Law 4622/2019 and reports to the Deputy Minister for Migration and Asylum. Its mission was to plan, implement and supervise the National Strategy in Greece for the protection of unaccompanied minors. On June 27, 2023, with Presidential Decree 77/2023, the Secretariat-General for Vulnerable Individuals & Institutional Protection was established, which took on all the responsibilities of the Secretariat Special for the Protection of Unaccompanied Minors.

== Ministers for Migration and Asylum (2020–present) ==
Name	Took office	Left office	Party	Notes
Notis Mitarachi	15 January 2020	26 May 2023	New Democracy	First cabinet of Kyriakos Mitsotakis
Daniel Esdras	26 May 2023	27 June 2023	Independent	Caretaker Cabinet of Ioannis Sarmas
Dimitris Kairidis	27 June 2023	14 June 2024	New Democracy	Second cabinet of Kyriakos Mitsotakis
Nikolaos Panagiotopoulos	14 June 2024	15 March 2025	New Democracy	Second cabinet of Kyriakos Mitsotakis
Makis Voridis	15 March 2025	27 June 2025	New Democracy	Second cabinet of Kyriakos Mitsotakis
Thanos Plevris	30 June 2025	Incumbent	New Democracy	Second cabinet of Kyriakos Mitsotakis
