= Spilios Livanos =

Greek politician (born 1967)

- Σπήλιος Λιβανός

Minister of Rural Development and Food
- In office 5 January 2021 – 7 February 2022
- Prime Minister: Kyriakos Mitsotakis
- Preceded by: Makis Voridis
- Succeeded by: Georgios Georgantas

Personal details
- Born: 20 September 1967 (age 58) Athens, Greece
- Party: New Democracy

Spilios Livanos (Greek: Σπήλιος Λιβανός; born 20 September 1967) is a Greek politician. On 5 January 2021, he was appointed Minister for Rural Development and Food in the cabinet of Prime Minister Kyriakos Mitsotakis. He resigned on 7 February 2022, after footage emerged of controversial remarks he had made about the 2007 Greek forest fires.
