= Makis Voridis =

Greek lawyer and politician

- Μάκης Βορίδης
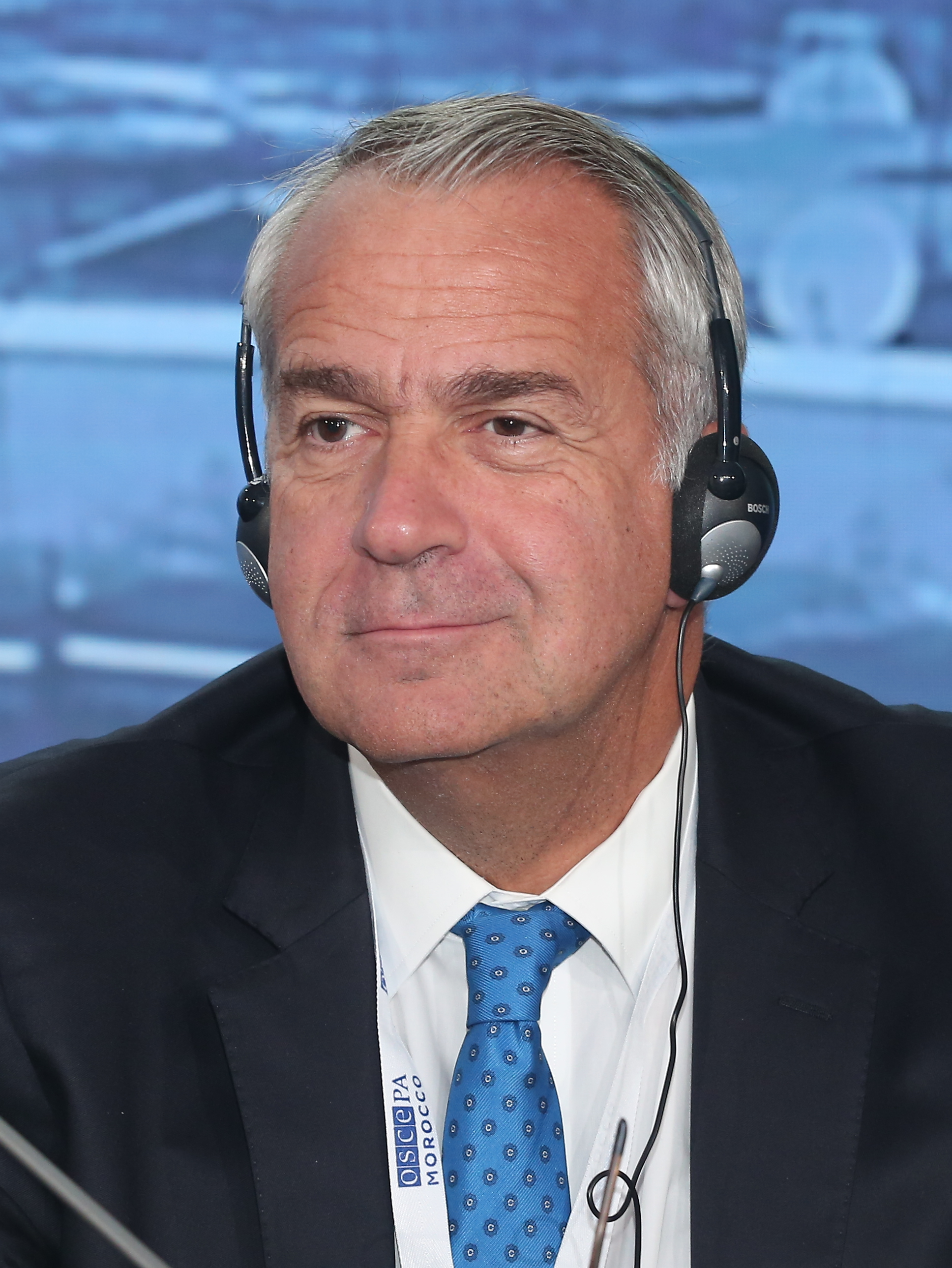
- Voridis in 2019

Minister for Migration and Asylum
- In office 15 March 2025 – 27 June 2025
- Prime Minister: Kyriakos Mitsotakis
- Preceded by: Dimitris Kairidis
- Succeeded by: Thanos Plevris

Minister of the State
- In office 27 June 2023 – 15 March 2025
- Prime Minister: Kyriakos Mitsotakis
- Preceded by: Vassilios Skouris

Minister for the Interior
- In office 5 January 2021 – 23 April 2023
- Prime Minister: Kyriakos Mitsotakis
- Preceded by: Takis Theodorikakos
- Succeeded by: Calliope Spanou

Minister for Rural Development and Food
- In office 9 July 2019 – 5 January 2021
- Prime Minister: Kyriakos Mitsotakis
- Preceded by: Stavros Arachovitis
- Succeeded by: Spilios Livanos

Minister for Health
- In office 10 June 2014 – 27 January 2015
- Prime Minister: Antonis Samaras
- Preceded by: Adonis Georgiadis
- Succeeded by: Panagiotis Kouroumblis (Health and Social Security)

Minister for Infrastructure, Transport and Networks
- In office 11 November 2011 – 17 May 2012
- Prime Minister: Lucas Papademos
- Preceded by: Giannis Ragousis
- Succeeded by: Simos Simopoulos

Personal details
- Born: 23 August 1964 (age 62) Athens, Kingdom of Greece
- Party: New Democracy (2012–present); Popular Orthodox Rally (2005–2012); Hellenic Front (1994–2005); National Political Union (1984–1990)
- Spouse: Danae Michelakos
- Children: Τitos; Lela
- Education: University of Athens; University College London

Mavroudis (Makis) Voridis (Greek: Μαυρουδής (Μάκης) Βορίδης; born 1964) is a Greek far-right politician, currently a member of New Democracy. He has a long history in far-right politics and was associated with military dictator Georgios Papadopoulos.

A member of the Hellenic Parliament since 2011, Voridis previously served as Minister for Migration and Asylum (2025), and Minister of the State (2023–2025) in the Second Cabinet of Kyriakos Mitsotakis, Minister for the Interior (2021–2023), and Minister for Rural Development and Food (2019–2021) in the First Cabinet of Kyriakos Mitsotakis, Minister for Health in the Cabinet of Antonis Samaras (2014–2015), and Minister for Infrastructure, Transport and Networks in the Cabinet of Lucas Papademos (2011–2012).

Makis Voridis is under investigation by the European Public Prosecutor and the Greek Parliament for his involvement in the OPEKEPE scandal. He is accused of tolerating, during his tenure as Minister of Development (July 2019 – January 2021), "a subsidy system for livestock farmers that facilitated the channeling of European funds either to beneficiaries who falsely inflated their claims or to individuals who were not even eligible, aiming to maximize the influence of New Democracy in Crete", while simultaneously ignoring information he had regarding serious irregularities in the allocation of agricultural subsidies.
Voridis immediately resigned from his position as Minister of Migration and Asylum to facilitate the criminal investigation of his actions or omissions.

== Early life and education ==
Makis Voridis was born in Athens on 23 August 1964 and has one brother, Konstantinos. His father, Christos, had served in the National Army during the Greek Civil War. His uncle was Eutychios Voridis, a renowned professor of cardiology.

Voridis graduated from Athens College, where he was active in the far-right student organisation "Free Students", and acquired his degree in the Law School of the University of Athens. During his time at the University of Athens, he was the leader of the far-right student group "Student Alternative" on account of which he was expelled from the students' union. He has subsequently rejected any connection with far-right politics and, in an interview to The Guardian, denied all allegations of crypto-fascism, antisemitism, or homophobia, describing himself as a national liberal with a right-wing activist background as a student.

Voridis studied at University College London from where he acquired his Master of Laws with merit, with specialty in international commercial law, criminal law, and the philosophy of law.

== Political career ==
=== Far-right activism and politics ===
In 1985, Voridis was appointed secretary general of the youth wing of the National Political Union (EPEN), a far-right political party founded by the jailed former dictator Georgios Papadopoulos, leader of the 1967 military coup. Voridis succeeded in the youth leadership Nikolaos Michaloliakos, who went on to lead Golden Dawn, and remained in that position until 1990.

During his military service from 1992 to 1993, Voridis graduated class leader in Armour School and served as an Armour Cadet Reserve Officer, with the rank of second lieutenant.

In 1994, he founded was elected president of the far-right Hellenic Front party, whose motto was "Red Card to Illegal Immigrants". He unsuccessfully ran for Athens mayor in 1998 and 2002. In the national elections of 2000, he ran without success together with fascist Konstantinos Plevris. In the next general election, in 2004, the Front gathered only approximately 7 thousand votes or 0.1% of the total, and, within a year, ceased its political activity and merged with the Popular Orthodox Rally (LAOS) party, with Voridis becoming member of the LAOS leading council.

In the 2006 local elections, Voridis later ran in the LAOS ticket for East Attica and, after gaining 5% of the vote, was elected prefectural councillor. On 16 September 2007, running with the LAOS ticket, he was elected Member of the Greek Parliament, with 8,663 direct votes in the Attica district.

=== Parliamentary career and government ===
In November 2011, after the outbreak of the Greek government-debt crisis, Voridis was appointed Minister for Infrastructure, Transport, and Networks in the coalition government headed by Lucas Papademos.

In February 2012, after the introduction in the Parliament of the bill enacting the second bailout package, Voridis, dissenting from the LAOS line, came out in support of the bill and was expelled from the party, though he retained his portfolio after consultations with the prime minister. A few days later, he joined New Democracy and surrendered his parliamentary seat to LAOS. As Minister, Voridis proceeded to open up to competition professional sectors such as drivers, a measure he had previously opposed.

On 10 June 2014, Voridis was appointed Minister for Health by prime minister Antonis Samaras. His appointment was reportedly criticised by members of the Greek Jewish community. Voridis served as chief parliamentary representative of the New Democracy party during the period 2012–24.

On 9 July 2019, he was appointed Minister for Rural Development and Food in the cabinet of New Democracy leader and prime minister Kyriakos Mitsotakis. A senior Israeli diplomat stated to the Jerusalem Post that Israel will not work with the new minister. World Jewish Congress head Ronald Lauder issued a statement after the election saying that prime minister Mitsotakis "is a true ally of Israel and has always demonstrated deep support and friendship for the Jewish community in Greece," and pointing out the "need to eradicate any and all remnants of antisemitism and neo-Nazi ideology from within the country."

On 5 January 2021, he was appointed Minister for the Interior, a position he held until 23 April 2023. On 27 June 2023, he assumed the portfolio of Minister of the State.

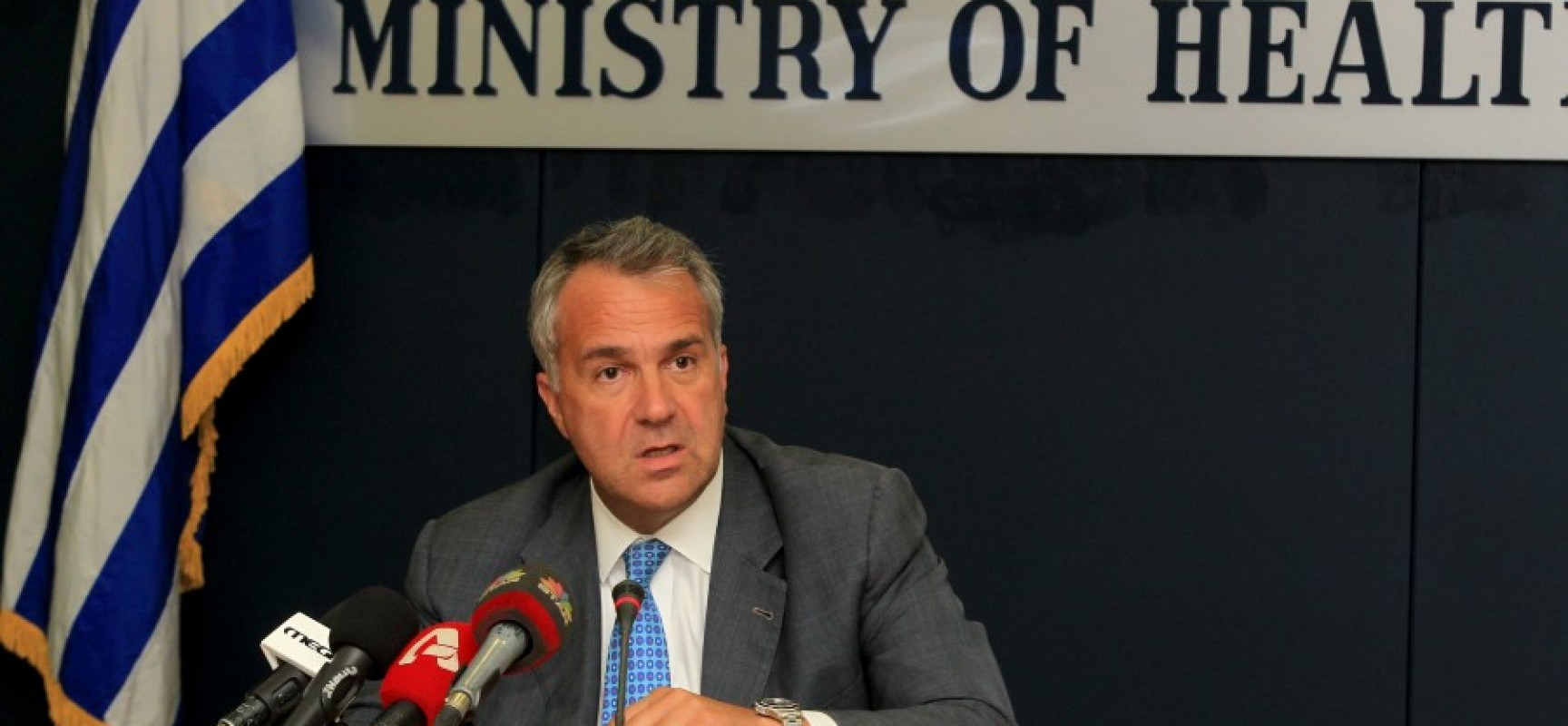
Press conference on the fiscal year's budget, Ministry of Health, 2014

On 15 March 2025, he was sworn in as Minister for Migration and Asylum. In 2025, he introduced a bill aimed at "tightening" the country's immigration framework that will introduce stricter measures for migrants who remain in the country illegally after being denied asylum. He pointed to the "broader shift in European migration policy":

In the past, there was the illusion that benefits and integration policies would solve the problem. This has collapsed. Europe has changed its strategy. Now the priority is effective border security and the return of illegal immigrants.

In May 2025, the European Public Prosecutor's Office in Athens announced that its investigation discovered an alleged organised fraud scheme involving agricultural funds, as well as corruption involving officials of the Payment and Audit Agency of Community Aid, Guidance, and Guarantees (Οργανισμός Πληρωμών και Ελέγχου Κοινοτικών Ενισχύσεων Προσανατολισμού και Εγγυήσεων, ΟΠΕΚΕΠΕ) of the Ministry of Rural Development and Food. Subsequently, Voridis resigned his government portfolio, along with the Deputy Foreign Minister, the Deputy Minister of Rural Development, the Deputy Minister of Digital Governance, and the Secretary General of Rural Development and Food, whose offices appeared in the Prosecutor's report. After the report was submitted to the Greek Parliament, (Note: The Greek Constitution provides that only the nation's Parliament has the authority to investigate and prosecute serving or former members of the national government. See Euronews (July 2025)) Voridis stated that it contains "no allegations whatsoever" of his involvement but he considers it his duty to resign so that he dedicates himself to clearing his name in the courts.

=== On gay marriage ===
Same-sex marriage was legalized in Greece on 16 February 2024, when the relevant legislation was signed into law, after being approved in parliament by 175 votes supporting it, 77 opposing it, 46 abstentions, and 2 declarations of being present. During the parliamentary debate on the legislation, (Note: In the 300-member Parliament of Greece, a simple majority of 151 supporting votes was required.) which was submitted by the recently re-elected New Democracy government, Voridis expressed his opposition, citing the ostensible need to first redefine constitutionally the institution of marriage, and abstained from the vote. Twenty-one MPs from the New Democracy ruling party voted against the bill, while thirty-one, including Voridis, abstained from the vote. The majority of opposition MPs voted in support of it. Greece, thus, became the 16th European Union country and the first Christian Orthodox-majority country to legalize same-sex marriage.

=== On antisemitism ===
Voridis has admitted his many years of coexistence with anti-Semites, but declared that he is "pro-Israel" and that he has never been an anti-Semite. In 2019, he visited the Jewish Museum of Greece, where he spoke about the history of "Greek Jews and their constant presence in Greece since ancient times". On behalf of the museum, the general secretary of the Central Israeli Council, Victor Eliezer, welcomed Voridis "as a friend of the Jewish people and the Israeli community in Greece".

== Personal life ==
Voridis was married to Zoe Rapti, who went on to enter politics as a New Democracy member of parliament and Deputy Minister for Health. After their divorce, he married Danae Michelakou, in 2005. They have two children, son Titos (b. 2007) and daughter Lela (b. 2013). Best man at their wedding was then-Front National prominent cadre Carl Lang.

== Notes ==
Political offices
Preceded by Giannis Ragousis	Minister for Infrastructure, Transport and Networks; 2011–2012	Succeeded by Simos Simopoulos
Preceded by Adonis Georgiadis	Minister for Health; 2014–2015	Succeeded by Panagiotis Kouroumblis as Minister for Health and Social Security
Preceded by Stavros Arachovitis	Minister for Rural Development and Food; 2019–2021	Succeeded by Spilios Livanos
Preceded by Takis Theodorikakos	Minister for the Interior; 2021–2023	Succeeded by Calliope Spanou
