= Iasonidis =

Iasonidis is a surname. Notable people with the surname include:

- Konstantinos Iasonidis
- Leonidas Iasonidis
