= Cabinet of Kyriakos Mitsotakis =

Cabinet of Kyriakos Mitsotakis can refer to:

- First Cabinet of Kyriakos Mitsotakis, July 2019–May 2023
- Second Cabinet of Kyriakos Mitsotakis, June 2023–
