= Stylianidis =

Stylianidis or Stylianides is a surname. Notable people with the surname include:

- Christos Stylianides (born 1958), Greek Cypriot politician
- Evripidis Stylianidis (born 1966), Greek politician
