= Antonis Manitakis =

Greek politician and jurist (1944–2026)

- Αντώνης Μανιτάκης
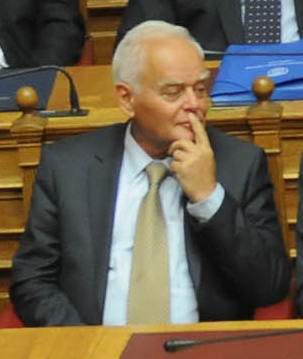
- Manitakis in 2017

Minister of the Interior and Administrative Reconstruction
- In office 28 August 2015 – 23 September 2015
- Prime Minister: Vassiliki Thanou
- Preceded by: Nikos Voutsis
- Succeeded by: Panagiotis Kouroumblis
- In office 17 May 2012 – 21 June 2012; Interior
- Prime Minister: Panagiotis Pikrammenos
- Preceded by: Tasos Giannitsis
- Succeeded by: Evripidis Stylianidis

Minister of Administrative Reform and e-Governance
- In office 21 June 2012 – 25 June 2013
- Prime Minister: Antonis Samaras
- Preceded by: Pavlos Apostolidis
- Succeeded by: Kyriakos Mitsotakis

Personal details
- Born: 23 May 1944 Thessaloniki, German-occupied Greece
- Died: 18 February 2026 (aged 81) Thessaloniki, Greece
- Party: Independent
- Spouse(s): Giota Kravaritou (divorced); Klita Theodorou (1993)
- Children: 2
- Education: University of Thessaloniki; Free University of Brussels, French
- Website: Official website

Antonis Manitakis (Greek: Αντώνης Μανιτάκης; 23 May 1944 – 18 February 2026) was a Greek university professor and politician. He was a Minister of administrative reform and e-governance (2012–2013) and a onetime interim Minister of the Interior and Administrative Reconstruction, having served in 2012 and 2015.

== Background ==
Manitakis was born in Thessaloniki on 23 May 1944. He studied law at the Law School of the Aristotle University of Thessaloniki and received a doctor of law from the University of Brussels. Afterwards, he was elected as a professor at the Law School of the Aristotle University of Thessaloniki. Antonis Manitakis was a student of Aristovoulos Manesis, whom he succeeded at the Constitutional law seat.

== Academic career ==
During his academic career, he was the dean of the School of Law and Political Sciences, as well as a visiting scholar at the University of Montpellier (1987), the University of Paris X (1989), the University of Rome La Sapienza (1994) and the University of Nantes (2002). From 2004 to 2010, he taught European Constitutional Law at the University of Montpellier's Law School summer seminars.

In 2007, Manitakis was awarded the award of exceptional university teaching by the President of Greece Karolos Papoulias. He served as a deputy chairman of the National Council of Radio and Television (1997–1999).

From April 2014, he was the Dean of the School of Law in the Neapolis University Paphos.

== Political career ==
In May 2012, Manitakis was appointed interim minister of interior to the Caretaker Cabinet of Panagiotis Pikrammenos. On 21 June, after a suggestion made by the Democratic Left, it was announced that he would participate in the Government of Antonis Samaras as the minister of administrative reform and e-governance.

== Personal life ==
Manitakis died on 18 February 2026, at the age of 81.

Political offices
Preceded by Tasos Giannitsis	Minister of the Interior; 2012	Succeeded by Evripidis Stylianidis
Preceded by Nikos Voutsis	Minister of the Interior and Administrative Reconstruction; 2015	Succeeded by Panagiotis Kouroumblis
