= Andreas Xanthos =

Greek politician

- Ανδρέας Ξανθός
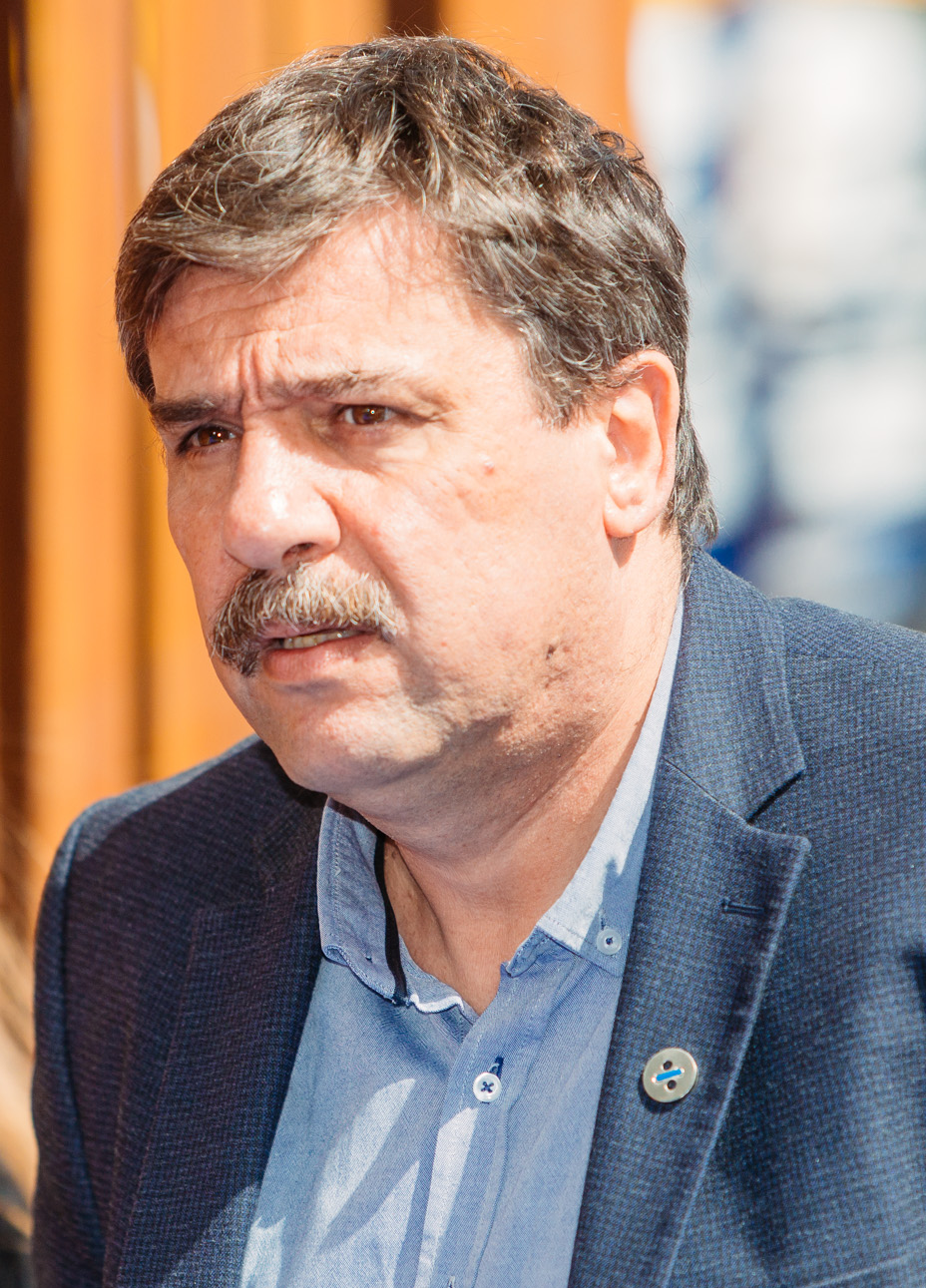

Minister of Health
- In office 23 September 2015 – 8 July 2019
- Prime Minister: Alexis Tsipras
- Preceded by: Athanasios Dimopoulos
- Succeeded by: Vasilis Kikilias

Alternate Minister of Health
- In office 27 January 2015 – 28 August 2015
- Prime Minister: Alexis Tsipras

Member of the Hellenic Parliament for Rethymno
- Incumbent
- Assumed office 6 May 2012

Personal details
- Party: Syriza
- Profession: Microbiologist

Andreas Xanthos is a Greek medical doctor and politician, and Member of the Hellenic Parliament for Rethymno on Crete for Syriza. From 2015 to 2019 he served as the Minister of Health in the Second Tsipras Cabinet. He previously served as an Alternate Minister of Health in the First Tsipras Cabinet and is a member of the Central Committee of Syriza.

== Education ==
Xanthos graduated from the medical school of the Aristotle University of Thessaloniki.

== Medical career ==
Xanthos specialises in microbiology and worked as a national health service doctor at the health centres in Perama and in Rethymno. He was, for several years, chairman of the doctors' union in Rethymno and also a member of the General Council of the Federation of Greek Hospital Doctors (OENGE) and the General Assembly of the Panhellenic Medical Association (PIS).

Xanthos took an active role in the establishment of a Voluntary Social Solidarity Clinic in Rethymno in 2008.

== Political career ==
Xanthos is a member of the Central Committee of Syriza. He was first elected as a Member of the Hellenic Parliament for Rethymno, Crete, in the May 2012 legislative election and was subsequently reelected in June 2012, January 2015 and September 2015.

In January 2015, Xanthos was appointed an Alternate Minister of Health in the First Cabinet of Alexis Tsipras. In April, he claimed between 2.5 and 3 million people are "lost in the bureaucracy of a National Health System" and announced plans to cover uninsured Greeks.

Following the formation of the Second Cabinet of Alexis Tsipras, in September 2015, Xanthos was appointed the Minister of Health. Pavlos Polakis was also appointed to the Ministry of Health as an Alternate Minister of Health. It was noted that both Xanthos and Polakis were Cretan ministers, two of only three in the government. In an interview with Kathimerini in October 2015, Xanthos addressed the frailty of the National Health System, noting that he was reversing the six year trend of reducing the number of staff in the Service by hiring 3,400 additional staff members by 2016.

In an interview with Mega, a television station, in November 2015, Xanthos acknowledged that "[t]he healthcare system condition is on the verge of falling apart and the government knows this." He also agreed with the warnings of doctors that the healthcare system was constantly on the verge of a blackout due to the lack of staff. In November, Xanthos also met with Elhadj As Sy, Secretary General of the IFRC, on a two-day visit to Greece.
