= Alexandros Kountouras =

Greek soldier

Alexandros Kountouras (Greek: Αλέξανδρος Κουντουράς d. 30 April 2012) was a Hellenic Army officer. In the era of the Metapolitefsi, he became known as one of the core supporters of the monarchy. He was a founder (along with Georgios Kourouklis) and afterwards the leader of BEO ("The National Byzantine Organisation", earlier the "National Royal Organization"), a name that was eventually modified due to litigation.

== Biography ==
Kountouras was an officer of Infantry in the Hellenic Army, with service in the Mountain Raiding Companies (LOK). In December 1967, he took part in the counter-coup d état of Constantine II of Greece, with whom he tried to counterattack against the junta. After its failure, the junta cashiered him.

In the plebiscite of 1974 for on the constitutional question, Kountouras agitated vigorously for monarchy over republic, and a little later, together with other monarchists (among whom were many ex-army officers, foremost among them Georgios Kourouklis) he helped found the BEO (Greek: «Βασιλική Εθνική Οργάνωση», Vasiliki Ethniki Organosi, "National Royal Organisation"). But the Konstantinos Karamanlis government lodged judicial proceedings against the BEO, which at last had to change its name to the «Βυζαντινή Εθνική Οργάνωση» (Vyzantini Ethniki Organosi, "National Byzantine Organisation).

The organisation faced fresh legal vicissitudes, with lawsuits and demurrers, by reason of its attendance at the proceedings of Palaeologeia (a Byzantine studies, cultural affairs and athletics gathering in Mistra) commemorating the Fall of Constantinople.

Alexandros Kountouras died in April of 2012. In their proclamations, monarchist organisations proclaimed that "He struggled on behalf of the institution of monarchy such as none other in Greece."

== Personal life ==
His daughter is model and politician Elena Kountoura. He also had a son, Nikos, who was Elena's manager during her modelling career, and later his own modelling agency which he managed with his wife. Presently, Elena is a member of the Greek parliament and the Alternate Minister for Tourism in the Second Cabinet of Alexis Tsipras, and Nikos serves as Elena's advisor.
