= Nikos Voutsis =

Greek politician

- Νίκος Βούτσης
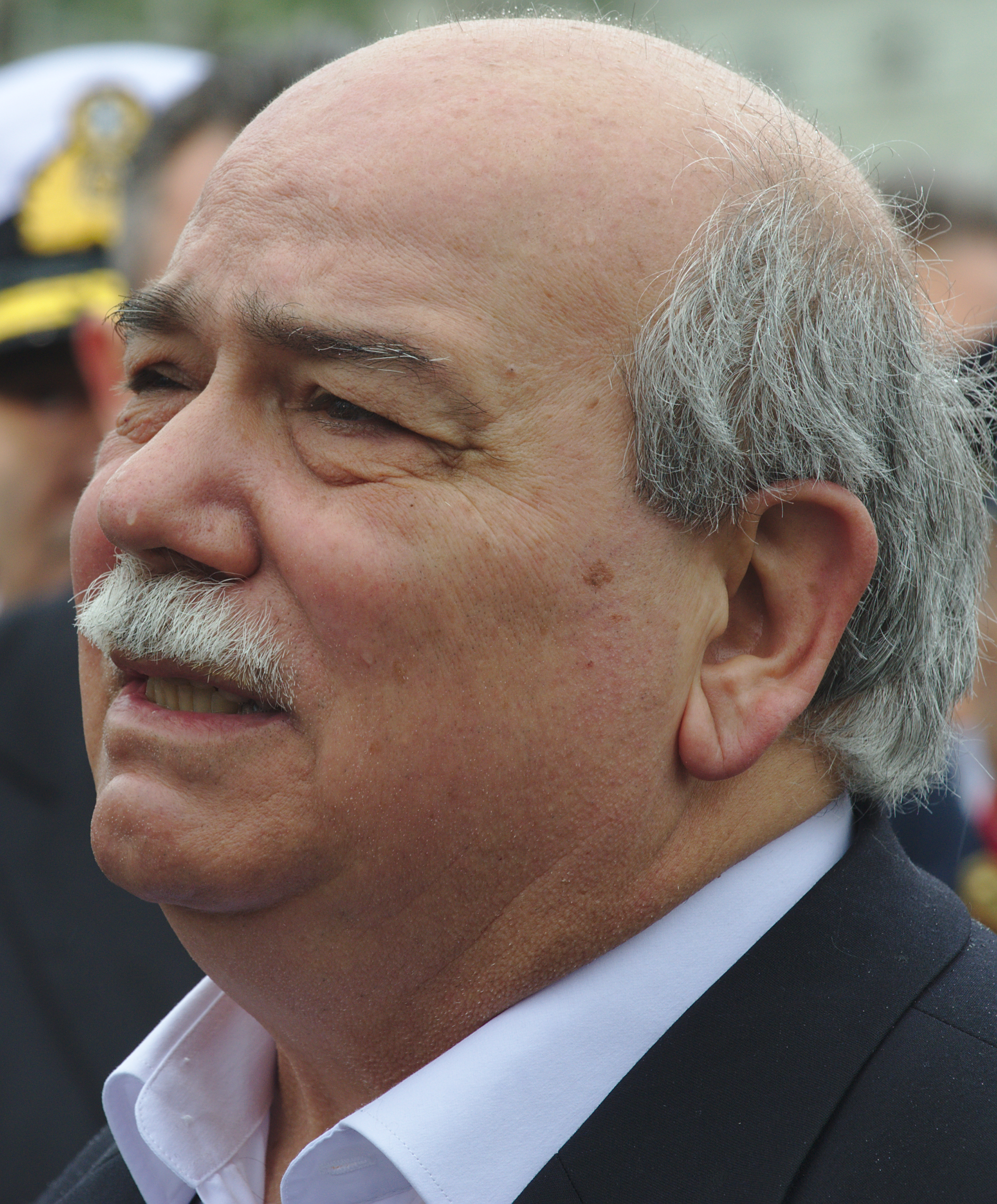
- Voutsis in 2016

12th Speaker of the Hellenic Parliament
- In office 4 October 2015 – 18 July 2019
- President: Prokopis Pavlopoulos
- Preceded by: Zoi Konstantopoulou
- Succeeded by: Konstantinos Tasoulas

Minister of the Interior and Administrative Reconstruction
- In office 27 January 2015 – 28 August 2015
- Prime Minister: Alexis Tsipras
- Preceded by: Argyris Dinopoulos
- Succeeded by: Antonis Manitakis

Member of the Hellenic Parliament
- In office 6 May 2012 – 29 May 2023
- Constituency: Athens A

Personal details
- Born: 4 March 1951 (age 75) Athens, Greece
- Party: Syriza
- Education: National Technical University of Athens

Nikos Voutsis (Greek: Νίκος Βούτσης; born 4 March 1951) is a Greek politician, former MP who served as the Minister of the Interior and Administrative Reconstruction from January 2015 to August 2015, and as President of the Hellenic Parliament from October 2015 to July 2019.

== Early life and education ==
Voutsis was born in Athens. He graduated from the University of Athens and the National Technical University of Athens with a degree in civil engineering.

== Political career ==
Voutsis served as a regional councillor in Attica with the group "Attiki Cooperation –No to the Memorandum" from 2010 to 2012.

Voutsis was first elected as a Member of the Hellenic Parliament representing Athens A in the May 2012 legislative election, and was reelected in June 2012 and January 2015.

Re-elected in the September 2015 elections, on 4 October 2015 he was elected as the new Speaker of the Hellenic Parliament with 181 votes.

After SYRIZA's defeat in the 2019 Greek legislative election, Voutsis' term as Parliament Speaker expired, and he was replaced by Kostas Tasoulas 18 July 2019. Nevertheless, Voutsis was still elected as an MP for SYRIZA.

Political offices
Preceded by Argyris Dinopoulos	Minister of the Interior and Administrative Reconstruction; 2015	Succeeded by Antonis Manitakis
Preceded by Zoi Konstantopoulou	Speaker of the Hellenic Parliament; 2015–2019	Succeeded by Konstantinos Tasoulas
Order of precedence
Preceded by Vangelis Meimarakis as Former Speaker	Order of precedence of Greece; Former Speaker	Succeeded by Ministerial Council Members
