= Fotini Pipili =

Greek politician and journalist

- Born: 7 February 195; Athens
- Citizenship: Greek
- Education: Aristotelian University of Thessaloniki
- Occupation: Greek Journalist Politician
- Employer: Greek Parliament

Fotini Pipili (Greek: Φωτεινή Πιπιλή) is a Greek journalist and politician and member of the Greek Parliament for the New Democracy for the Athens A constituency.

She was born in Athens, on 7 February 1950, and started her career as a journalist from the woman's magazine PANTHEON (Greek: ΠΑΝΘΕΟΝ). She has studied law in the Aristotelian University of Thessaloniki.

She was member of the Town Council of Athens from 1986 to 1994. In February 2006 she was acting mayor for a week replacing Dora Bakoyannis.

In 2007, she was elected MP of the Greek Parliament for the first time. She retained her seat in the 2009 elections.

In March 2010, she starred in the Greek version of "Dancing with the Stars" on channel ANT1.

Preceded by Dora Bakoyannis	Mayor of Athens (interim); 2006	Succeeded by Theodoros Behrakis
