= Unitary Front =

Unitary Front Ενωτική Μέτωπο
- Leader: Panagiotis Kouroumplis
- Founder: Panagiotis Kouroumplis
- Founded: November 2011
- Dissolved: November 2013
- Split from: Panhellenic Socialist Movement
- Merged into: Syriza
- Headquarters: 1, Nikis & Apollonos Street - Athens
- Ideology: Democratic socialism Social democracy
- Political position: Centre-left
- National affiliation: Syriza–EKM
- Colours: green, yellow, red

Unitary Front (Greek: Ενωτικό Μέτωπο) was a short-lived center-left party in Greece.

The party split in 2011 from the governing Panhellenic Socialist Movement (PASOK), on the grounds that it didn't agree with prime minister George Papandreou's fiscal austerity course imposed by the Memorandum of the Troika. The party contested the two consecutive legislative elections in 2012 in a joint list with the Coalition of the Radical Left (Syriza), and in November 2013 merged into the new unitary Syriza party.

== History ==
The party was established under the initial name Unitary Movement (Ενωτική Κίνηση) in November 2011 by former PASOK MP Panagiotis Kouroumplis, political theory professor Nikos Kotzias, the lawyer and Regional Director of Attica Alexis Mitropoulos. It was joined by more executives from PASOK and activists from the extra-parliamentary left.

In May 2012, the party contested the legislative election in a joint "SYRIZA-EKM" list together with the Coalition of the Radical Left, with "EKM" representing Unitary Social Front (Ενωτικό Κοινωνικό Μέτωπο), reminding of both the Unitary Movement and the Social Agreement (KOISY) party Syriza at that time hoped would join as well.

Ahead of the repeated June 2012 election, the Unitary Movement participated in the swift registration of Syriza-EKM as a unitary party to accommodate for the Greek electoral system, giving the strongest party a majority bonus, provided it is a unitary party and not a mere electoral list.

In July 2013, the party called for aggressive renegotiations of the terms of the Memorandum and criticized the Democratic Left (DIMAR) party for supporting the government's neoliberal policies. Soon thereafter, the party decided to ultimately dissolve into the final Syriza unitary party at the foundation congress in November 2013.
