= Nikos Papathanasis =

Greek politician (born 1960)

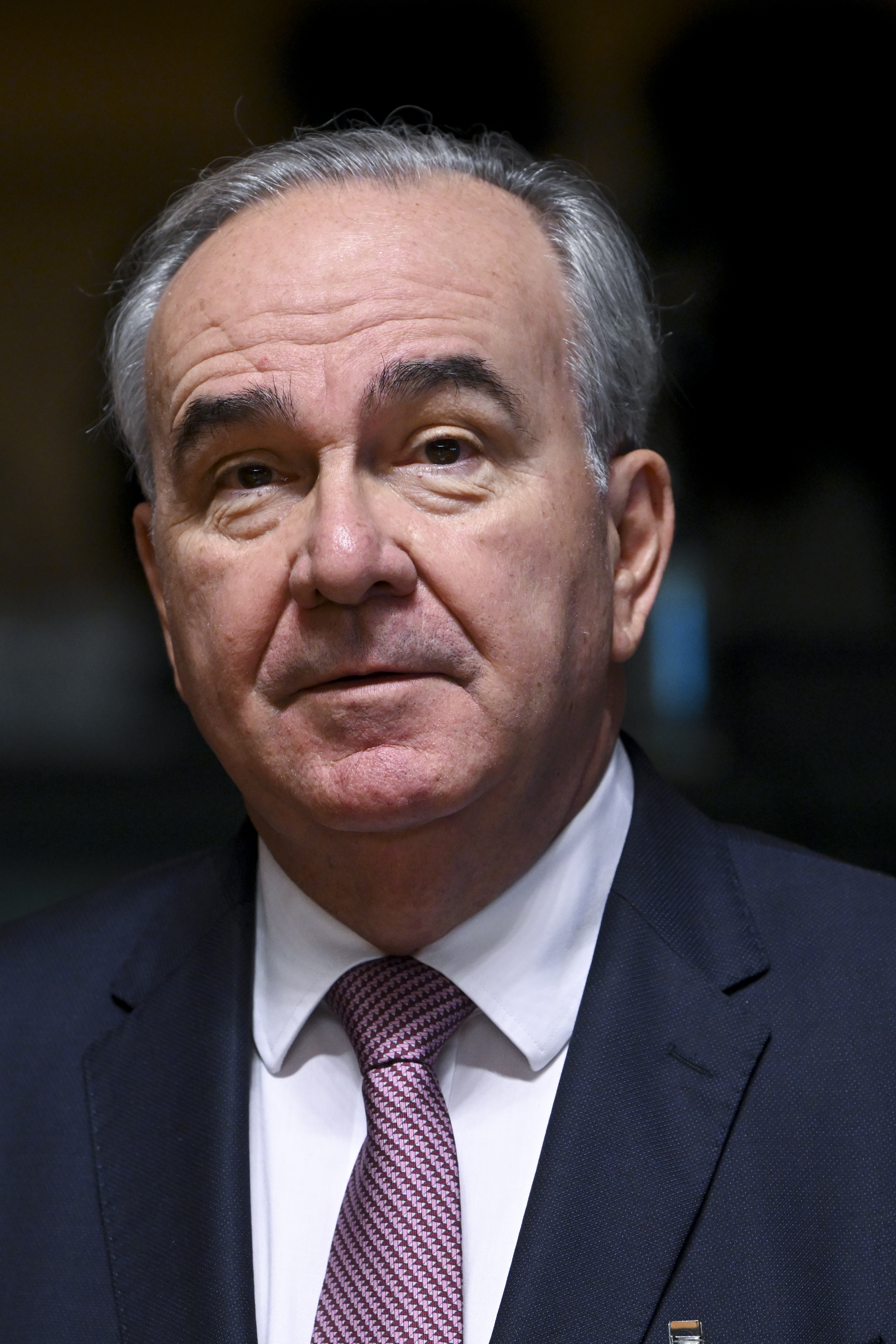
Nikos Papathanasis

Nikos Papathanasis (Greek: Νίκος Παπαθανάσης; born 1960) is a Greek politician and is currently the Alternate Minister of National Economy and Finance in the cabinet of Kyiakos Mitsotakis.

== Biography ==
He was born in 1960 in Kallithea, Athens. He studied mechanical engineering at the University of Toronto and did postgraduate studies in business administration and aeronautics.

He was a member of the Board of Directors. of the Hellenic Aerospace Industry (EAB) from 1989 - 1991, deputy general manager at Olympic Aviation from 1991 - 1993, managing director of Athens–Piraeus Electric Railways ISAP in the period 2005 - 2009, president of the Center of Greek Public Enterprises and Public Interest Organizations (KEDEO) from 2008-2010, as well as president of STASY SA, from 2012-2014.

== Politics ==
In 2016, he was appointed general director of New Democracy. On July 8, 2019, he was appointed Deputy Minister of Development and Investments, responsible for Industry and Trade, in the Ministry of Development and Investments of the Government of Kyriakos Mitsotakis.

On August 4, 2020, he was promoted to alternate minister of Development and Investments.
