= Apostolos Vesyropoulos =

Greek politician (1966–2025)

- Απόστολος Βεσυρόπουλος

Deputy Minister for Taxation Policy and Public Property
- In office 9 July 2019 – 26 May 2023
- Prime Minister: Kyriakos Mitsotakis

Member of the Hellenic Parliament
- In office 17 June 2012 – 21 August 2025
- Constituency: Imathia

Personal details
- Born: 29 May 1966 Veria, Greece
- Died: 21 August 2025 (aged 59) Agios Nikolaos, Chalkidiki, Greece
- Party: New Democracy
- Education: Democritus University of Thrace
- Website: vesiropoulos.gr/

Apostolos Vesyropoulos (Greek: Απόστολος Βεσυρόπουλος; 29 May 1966 – 21 August 2025) was a Greek politician and economist who served as Deputy Minister for Taxation Policy and Public Property for New Democracy until 2023. He also served as an MP for Imathia.

== Life and career ==
Vesyropoulos was born in Veria on 29 May 1966. He studied at the School of Management and Economics of the ATEI of Larissa (Department of Accounting), and did his postgraduate studies in the Department of Public Law and Political Science of the Law School of the Democritus University of Thrace.

He worked as a tax collector in Veria and from 2004 to 2008 he was a member of the board of directors of DAKE Tax Office of Imathia - Pella - Pieria. He also served as Municipal Councilor in Veria and deputy mayor of Imathia, responsible for the Directorates of Rural Development, Finance, Trade and Consumer Protection. From 2010 he served as vice-president of the Prefectural Administrative Committee (NODE) of Imathia for the New Democracy party.

Vesyropoulos was elected as MP for New Democracy in Imathia in the elections of June 2012 and re-elected in January and September 2015, and 2019. The Mitsotakis government assigned Vesyropoulos as Deputy Minister on taxation policy and state assets.

Vesyropoulos died from a cardiac arrest on 21 August 2025, at the age of 59.
