= Thanos Plevris =

Greek politician (born 1977)

Thanos Plevris MP
- Θάνος Πλεύρης
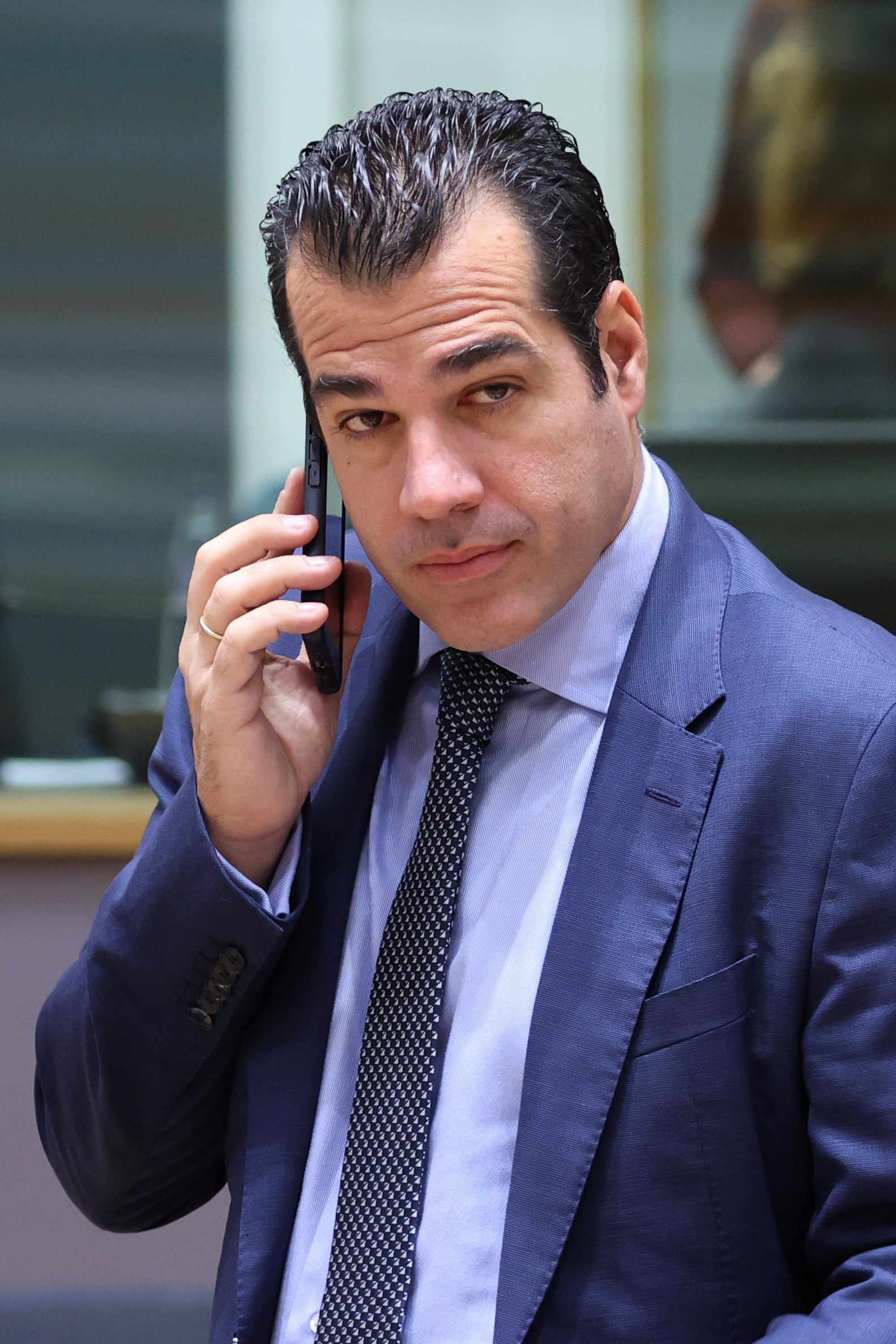
- Plevris in 2022

Minister for Migration and Asylum
- Incumbent
- Assumed office 28 June 2025
- Prime Minister: Kyriakos Mitsotakis
- Preceded by: Makis Voridis

Minister for Health
- In office 31 August 2021 – 26 May 2023
- Prime Minister: Kyriakos Mitsotakis
- Preceded by: Vasilis Kikilias
- Succeeded by: Anastasia Kotanidou

Member of the Hellenic Parliament for Athens A
- Incumbent
- Assumed office 7 July 2019
- In office 3 November 2014 – 25 January 2015
- In office 4 October 2009 – 11 April 2012
- In office 16 September 2007 – 3 July 2009

Member of the European Parliament for Greece
- In office 3 July 2009 – 4 October 2009

Personal details
- Born: 21 May 1977 (age 49) Athens, Greece
- Party: New Democracy (since 2012); Popular Orthodox Rally (until 2012)
- Spouse: Lena Papatheologou
- Children: 2
- Parents: Konstantinos Plevris (father); Niki Lytra (mother)
- Education: University of Athens; Heidelberg University
- Occupation: Lawyer

Athanasios "Thanos" Plevris (Greek: Αθανάσιος "Θάνος" Πλεύρης; born 21 May 1977) is a Greek right-wing politician and son of author Konstantinos Plevris who served as the Minister for Health under the cabinet of Kyriakos Mitsotakis from 2021 to 2023. He currently serves as Minister for Migration and Asylum. Plevris is often described as a far-right and Islamophobic voice in Greek politics.

== Political career ==
He was first elected to the Hellenic Parliament with the ultraconservative Popular Orthodox Rally at the 2007 parliamentary election. He was subsequently elected to the European Parliament in June 2009, before returning to the national parliament at the election held in October of the same year. When the Popular Orthodox Rally failed to reach the electoral threshold of 3% at the May 2012 election, Plevris joined New Democracy and became the party's first substitute after the election held the following month.

A few months after being elected to the Athens city council in May 2014, he was sworn in as a member of parliament for the third time in November 2014, replacing Dimitris Avramopoulos who had resigned his seat in order to serve on the European Commission. Plevris failed to be re-elected at the elections of January and September 2015, but returned to the legislature at the 2019 election. He served as Minister for Health in the Cabinet of Kyriakos Mitsotakis from 2021 to 2023. He was appointed Minister for Migration and Asylum in June 2025.

Plevris practices law in Athens, having completed postgraduate and doctoral studies in medical law at Heidelberg University and in criminal law from the University of Athens respectively. He represented as lawyer the eight police officers accused of brutality against Zak Kostopoulos. He completed his military service as a sergeant in the 32nd Marines Brigade.

== Controversies ==
He is widely seen as a far-right figure in Greek politics and some of his opinions have been described as extreme and racist. In the 1990s during his academic years he used to participate in nationalist protests and in at least one instance was caught on camera burning Turkish flags alongside supporters of the neo-nazi party Golden Dawn.

=== Immigration ===
Plevris has also advocated the use of deadly force as a deterrent against illegal immigration. He has also suggested that immigrants should be denied access to food, water and health care, in order to make their living conditions in Greece less attractive than those in their homelands.

In July 2025, Plevris was among several European officials declared "persona non grata" by the Government of National Stability in eastern Libya after he and the said officials held an earlier meeting with officials of the rival Government of National Unity based in Tripoli to discuss migration.

That same month, Plevris implemented a three month suspension of asylum processing for migrants from North Africa, drawing criticism from human rights groups. The government also introduced a new law concerning those whose asylum claims have been rejected: they will have to choose between voluntary deportation or jail sentences of two to five years, as well as fines of up to 10,000 euros ($11,600), if convicted of illegal entry and stay. In June 2026, the government passed legislation that would speed up deportations and allow the transfer of rejected asylum seekers to ‘return hubs’ outside the EU, in Africa.

=== Antisemitism ===
While representing his father in court in 2019, he argued that Konstantinos Plevris’s public desire to see the return of Nazis and the reopening of the Auschwitz concentration camps should not count as hate speech or incitement under Greek law. After he was appointed as Minister for Health in 2021, some of this previous comments and statements resurfaced, resulting in a strong reaction by the Central Board of Jewish Communities in Greece. They issued a statement expressing concern over the appointment of Thanos Plevris as minister of health in the cabinet reshuffle. Plevris later apologised and avowed his “absolute respect” for Holocaust victims and opposition to antisemitism.

=== Vaccinations ===
In July 2021 he published an op-ed article expressing controversial opinions about mandatory vaccinations and asking “if a citizen does not want to be vaccinated, is it my responsibility to convince them or should they go and get vaccinated themselves?". After his appointment in September 2021, some of his previous comments on scientific approaches and vaccination strategies resurfaced and were labelled as 'antivax'.
