= Nikos Filis =

Greek politician and journalist

Nikos Filis Νίκος Φίλης MP
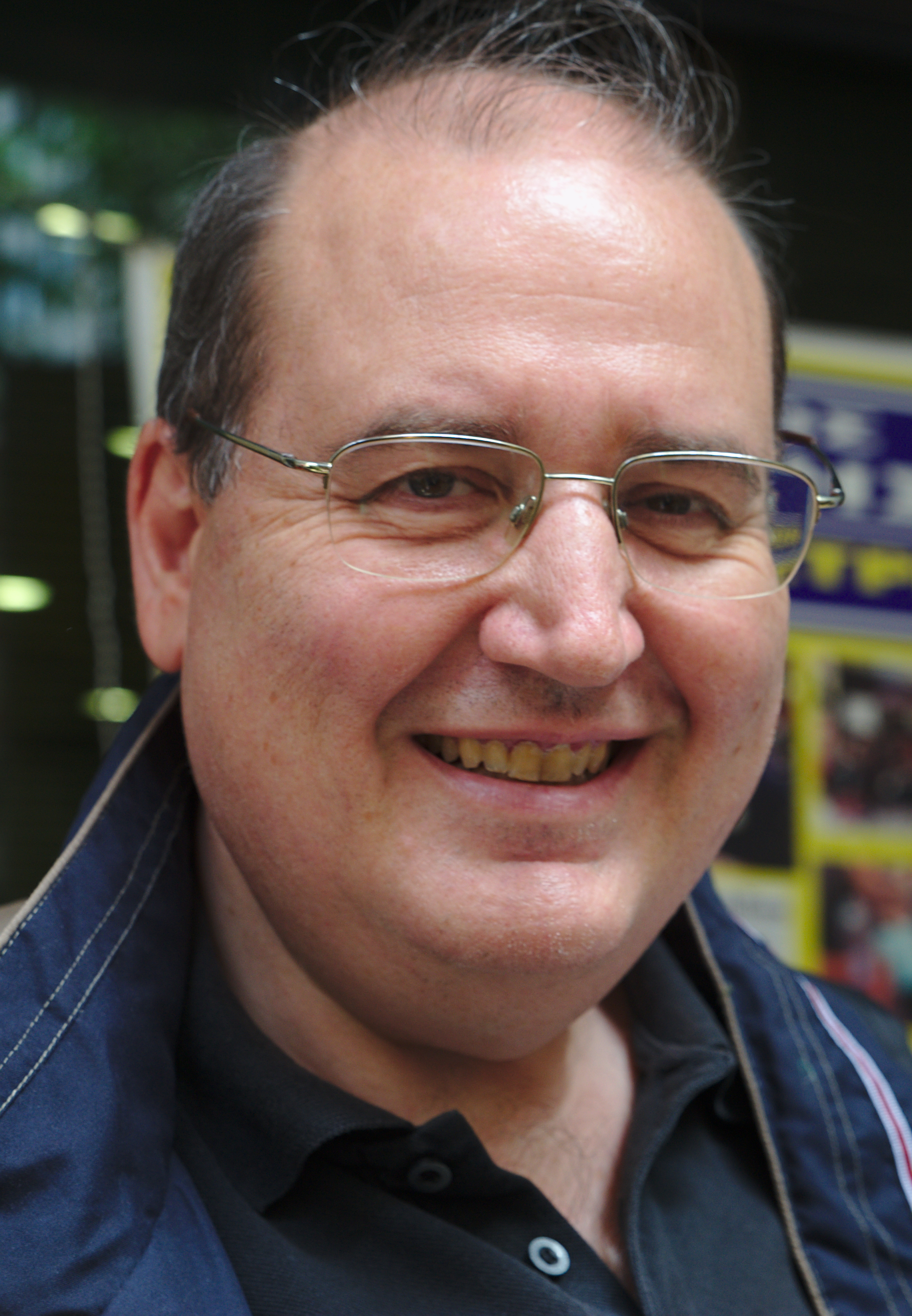

Minister of Education and Religious Affairs
- In office 23 September 2015 – 5 November 2016
- Prime Minister: Alexis Tsipras
- Preceded by: Frosso Kiaou
- Succeeded by: Kostas Gabroglou

Member of the Hellenic Parliament for Athens A
- Incumbent
- Assumed office 25 January 2015

Personal details
- Born: 1960 (age 65–66) Athens, Greece
- Party: Syriza
- Education: University of Athens

Nikos Filis (Greek: Νίκος Φίλης) is a Greek politician and journalist. He held the office of the Ministry of National Education and Religious Affairs of Greece from 23 September 2015 to 5 November 2016.

== Early life and education ==
Filis was born in Athens in 1960. He studied law at the University of Athens and was heavily involved in protests at the time. He was a member of both the Central Committee and Senate of the national students union, EFEE, and was secretary of the youth of the Communist Party of Greece (Interior).

== Journalism ==
Since 2008, Filis has been the director of the Greek newspaper Dawn. He has been a member of the board of the Greek journalists union, ESIEA. He has worked as an editor at various radio stations, including FLASH, Polis, VimaFm and EPA 4. He has written a number of articles on politics for newspapers Ta Nea, Epochi and the magazines Anti and Politis. He also contributed to the Encyclopedia of the Greek Press.

== Political career ==
Filis is a member of the Central Committee of Syriza. In March 2015, Filis was one of only five Syriza MPs to turn down the offer of a state car. In an interview with Mega TV in May 2015, Filis stated that: "A state must be ready for every eventuality. A Greek default is a concern of the whole of Europe. There is a systemic risk there. The chosen strategy is to negotiate an agreement but we are ready for every possible outcome."

As minister of Education and Religious Affairs he clashed with Archbishop Ieronymos about teaching of the religion course in schools.

== Genocide denial ==
Filis denied the Pontic Greek Genocide, an illegal act in Greece. Many calls were made for him to step down and have his parliamentary immunity stripped so he can be prosecuted. Filis has yet to face prosecution for his Genocide denial. He has also removed the Pontic Genocide from the high school curriculum.
