= Christoforos Vernardakis =

Greek academic and politician

- Χριστόφορος Βερναρδάκης

Member of the Hellenic Parliament for Athens A
- Incumbent
- Assumed office 19 November 2015

Minister of State for Government Coordination
- In office 5 November 2016 – 9 July 2019
- President: Prokopis Pavlopoulos
- Prime Minister: Alexis Tsipras
- Preceded by: none (new post)
- Succeeded by: none (post abolished)

Alternate Minister of Administrative Reform
- In office 17 July 2015 – 20 August 2015
- President: Prokopis Pavlopoulos
- Prime Minister: Alexis Tsipras
- In office 23 September 2015 – 5 November 2016

Personal details
- Party: Syriza
- Education: National and Kapodistrian University of Athens
- Website: www.vernardakis.gr

Christoforos Vernardakis (Greek: Χριστόφορος Βερναρδάκης) is a Greek academic who served as a Minister of State in the Second Cabinet of Alexis Tsipras, from 2016 to 2019. From 2015 to 2016, he served as Alternate Minister of Administrative Reform in the same Cabinet. He is an MP for Athens A constituency.

== Biography ==
Vernardakis studied at the National and Kapodistrian University of Athens and graduated with a BA in political science, and afterwards studied in France, taking diplomas at the Sorbonne before returning to the University of Athens to take his PhD in 1995. In 1993, he founded the polling organisation VPRC, and became its president in 2004. After a term as a lecturer at the University of Crete (2004-2009), he became an assistant professor at the Aristotle University of Thessaloniki. In the January 2015 Greek legislative election he stood election for Athens A and was seated with Syriza without election.
