= Elena Kountoura =

Greek politician (born 1962)

Elena Kountoura MEP
- Έλενα Κουντουρά
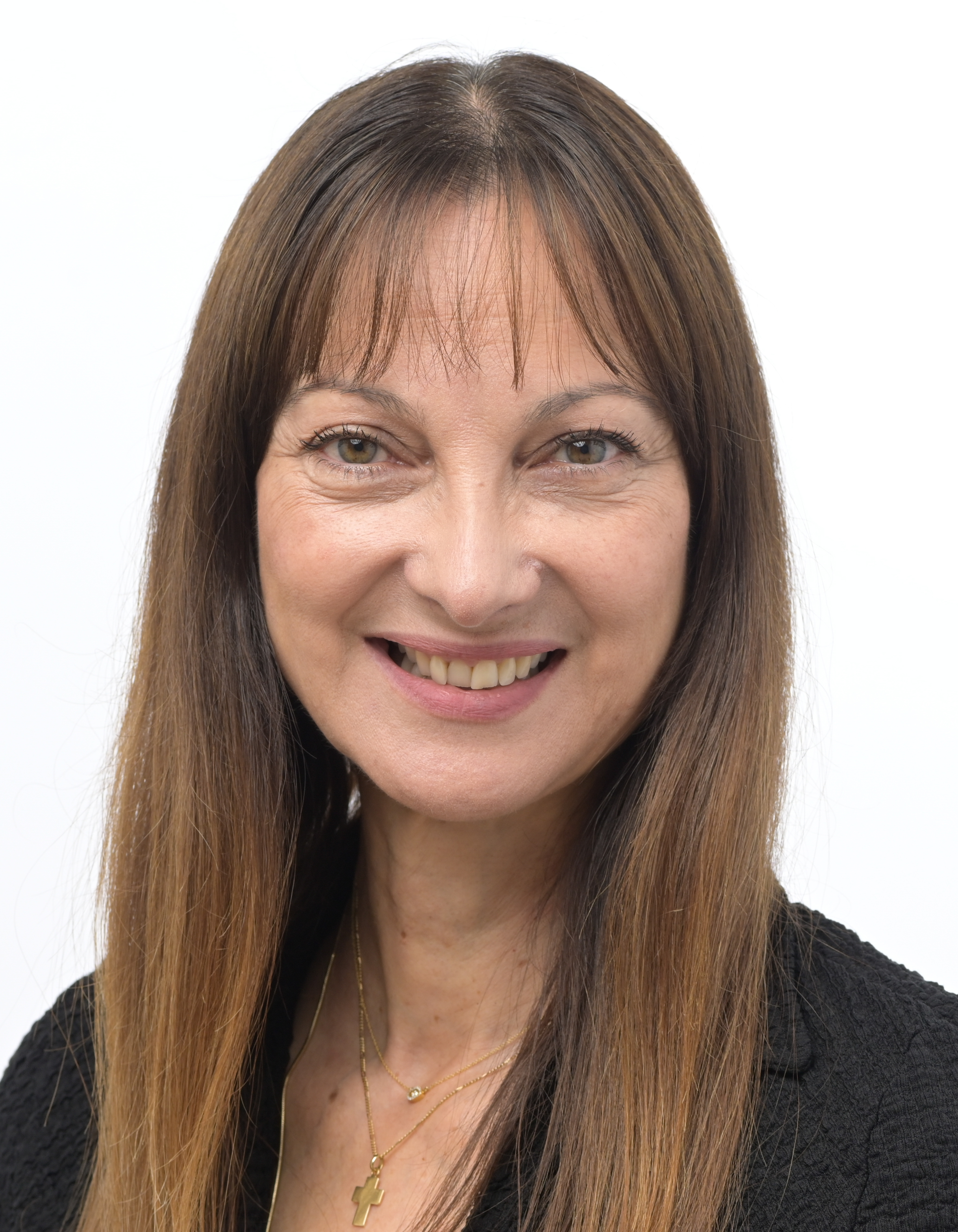

Member of the European Parliament
- Incumbent
- Assumed office 2 July 2019
- Constituency: Greece

Minister for Tourism
- In office 23 September 2015 – 3 May 2019
- President: Prokopis Pavlopoulos
- Prime Minister: Alexis Tsipras
- Preceded by: Alkistis Protopsalti
- Succeeded by: Thanasis Theocharopoulos
- In office 27 January 2015 – 28 August 2015
- President: Prokopis Pavlopoulos
- Prime Minister: Alexis Tsipras
- Preceded by: Olga Kefalogianni
- Succeeded by: Alkistis Protopsalti

Member of the Hellenic Parliament for Athens A
- In office 2004–2015

Personal details
- Born: 2 November 1962 (age 64) Athens, Greece
- Party: Syriza (from 2019); Independent Greeks (2012–2019); New Democracy (until 2012)
- Spouse: Sarantis Papachristopoulos
- Relations: Alexandros Kountouras (father), Nikos Kountouras (brother)
- Children: 2
- Education: National and Kapodistrian University of Athens
- Website: elenakountoura.gr

Elena Kountoura (Greek: Έλενα Κουντουρά, also romanized as Elena Koundoura; born 2 November 1962) is a Greek politician, Member of the European Parliament, ex-Minister of Tourism (resigned in 2019 in order to participate in the European Parliament's elections) in the Cabinet of Alexis Tsipras, and Member of Parliament for Athens A, for the Independent Greeks, and earlier for New Democracy. Before her entrance into politics, she was an international model, director of a women's magazine and a track-and-field athlete.

== Biography ==
=== Early life and education ===
She was born in Athens and is the daughter of the former Hellenic Army officer and monarchist Alexandros Kountouras. Her father is co-founder and ongoing leader of BEO (Βυζαντινή Εθνική Οργάνωση, Vyzantini Ethniki Organosi, "National Byzantine Organisation", earlier Vasiliki Ethniki Organosi, "National Royal Organisation"), the title of which was changed in the Metapolitefsi for legal reasons.

Kountoura was engaged in athletics from childhood. Her father enrolled her in the National Gymnastic Academy of Greece at the age of twelve as a high-jumper in training. She is a graduate of the National Gymnastic Academy and of the Department of Sport Science and Physical Education (TEFAA) at the National and Kapodistrian University of Athens. She was a top athlete on the Greek National Track and Field Team, and won the high jump and the 100 metre dash at the 1978 Panhellenic Women's Track & Field Championship.

=== Modelling career ===
"From 1984 to 1997 she had an international career as a model, and in 1990 she was chosen by CNN as one of the ten most beautiful models in the world. She collaborated for many years with Serge Lutens, a well-known French photographer, designer and producer in the world of fashion, while also having the good fortune to collaborate with the Japanese cosmetics company Shiseido, and is the model most recognized as spokesperson for that brand, and whose face was published in international campaigns".

=== Return to Greece and political career ===
In 1997, she returned to Greece, and from 2004 she was director of a women's magazine. In the 2004 elections, she was elected member of parliament for Athens A for New Democracy. In 2007 and 2009 she was runner-up, even though in 2007 she gathered more votes than in 2004. In November 2011, Elena returned to parliament when Dimitris Avramopoulos vacated his parliamentary seat to become a minister in the government of Lucas Papademos. In February 2012, she voted against the "Memorandum 2" and party leader Antonis Samaras struck her from the party list of New Democracy.

In the dual elections of May and June 2012, she was elected member of parliament for Athens A with Independent Greeks, while as of 2014 she assumed the office of Secretary of the Parliamentary Committee for Cinema.

On 14 January 2019, she was expelled from Independent Greeks due to her continuing support for the Tsipras government following the Prespa agreement, which sparked the party's withdrawal from the governing coalition. She was then elected to the European Parliament on the Syriza ticket at the 2019 election.

=== Personal life and family ===
Kountoura is married to former Panellinios and Olympiacos basketball player Sarantis Papachristopoulos, her second husband. The couple have two boys, Alexandros and Marios. Previously she was married to (soccer) footballer Michel Pineda. Papachristopoulos is also a magazine entrepreneur, having worked to localise risqué lifestyle and entertainment magazines such as Shock, Playboy, and Penthouse for the Greek market through the company Dafni Epikinonies (Daphne Communications). Her older brother is Nikos Kountouras, who works as her political adviser. Nikos is married to former model Xenia Pantazi; for ten years, he worked as his sister's manager, and then, together with his wife, had a modelling agency known as Elena's Models.

Kountoura is a noted philanthropist, having served as a goodwill ambassador for UNESCO, UNICEF. She founded her own philanthropic organization Europa Donna Hellas, capitalising on her fame as a model and their publishing connections to bring attention to various causes, in cooperation with her husband, capitalising on his ongoing editorial positions. Kountoura speaks English, French and Spanish in addition to her native Greek. She is still an agency-represented model, currently with Stars Model Management based in San Francisco.
