= Panagiotis Kouroumblis =

Greek politician

Panagiotis Kouroumblis MP
- Παναγιώτης Κουρουμπλής
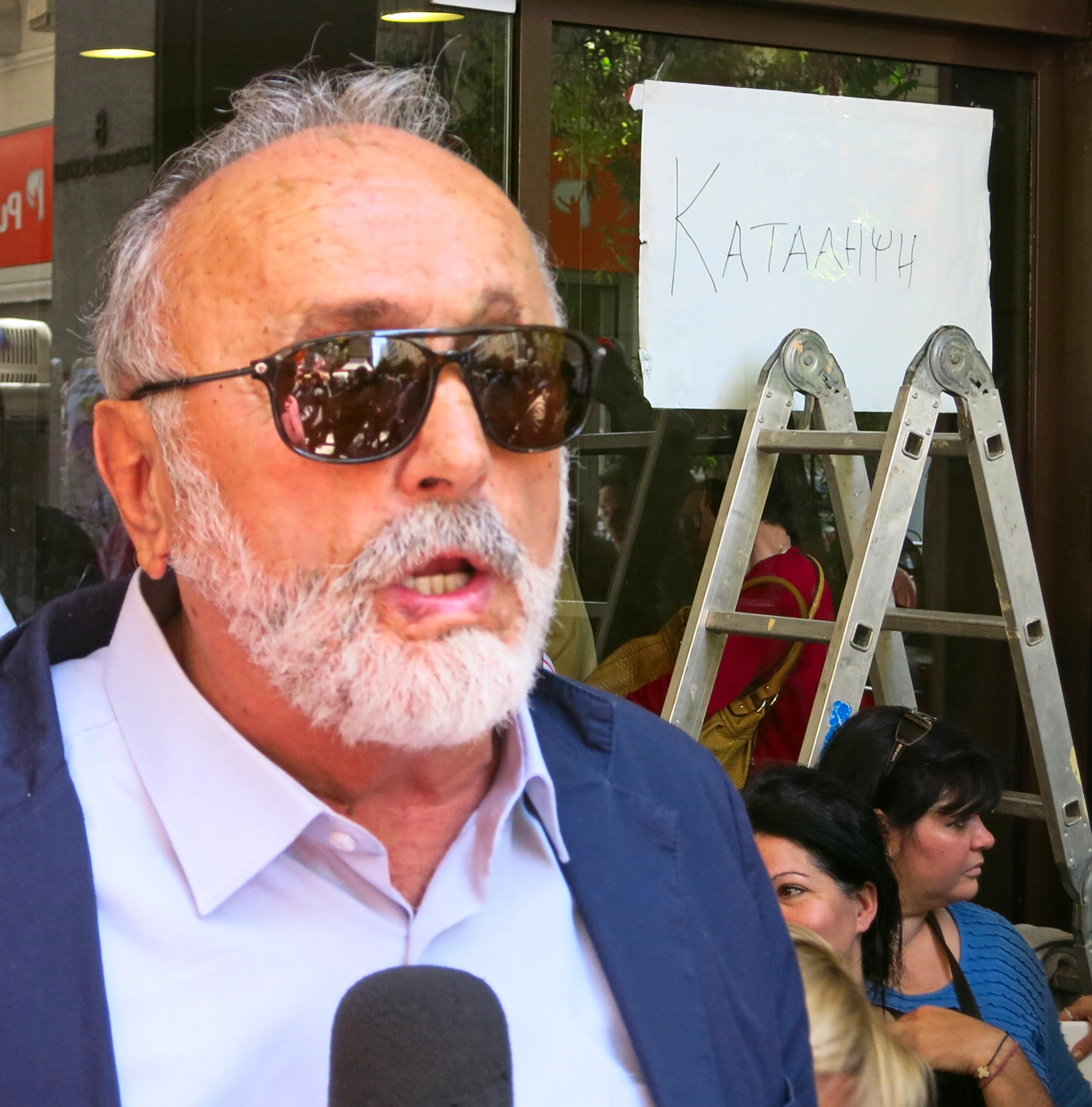

Minister of Shipping and Island Policy
- In office 5 November 2016 – 28 August 2018
- Prime Minister: Alexis Tsipras
- Preceded by: Thodoris Dritsas
- Succeeded by: Fotis Kouvelis

Minister of the Interior and Administrative Reconstruction
- In office 23 September 2015 – 5 November 2016
- Prime Minister: Alexis Tsipras
- Preceded by: Antonis Manitakis
- Succeeded by: Panos Skourletis

Minister for Health and Social Security
- In office 27 January 2015 – 28 August 2015
- Prime Minister: Alexis Tsipras
- Preceded by: Makis Voridis
- Succeeded by: Athanasios Dimopoulos

Personal details
- Born: 2 October 1951 (age 74) Matsouki, Aetolia-Acarnania, Greece
- Party: SYRIZA (2012–2024); Unitary Front (2011–2012); PASOK (2009–2011)
- Spouse: Eleni Kotsopoulou
- Children: Two (Katerina, Lefteris)
- Profession: Lawyer

Panagiotis Kouroumblis (Greek: Παναγιώτης Κουρουμπλής; born 2 October 1951) is a Greek politician of Syriza. On 27 January 2015 he was appointed the Minister for Health and Social Solidarity in the First Cabinet of Alexis Tsipras. On 23 September 2015, he became the Minister of the Interior and Administrative Reconstruction in the Second Cabinet of Alexis Tsipras.

== Early life ==
Blinded at age 10 from the explosion of a German hand-grenade, a remnant of World War II, Kouroumblis took part in a number of student campaigns, and eventually became the leader of a "social uprising" of the blind. He is a founding member of the World Blind Union and worked more generally in the areas of children protection, care for the elderly and people with disabilities.

== Political career ==
In 1996 parliamentary election, Kouroumblis became the first blind Member of the Hellenic Parliament. He was reelected in 2000 and again in 2009. In 2011, he left Panhellenic Socialist Movement (PASOK) to found the anti-austerity Unitary Movement that in 2013 ultimately merged into Syriza.

Following Syriza's victory in the January 2015 legislative election, he was appointed Minister for Health and Social Solidarity, becoming the first disabled person to take any public office at the national government level in Greece.

Political offices
Preceded by Makis Voridis as Minister for Health	Minister for Health and Social Security; 2015	Succeeded by Athanasios Dimopoulos
Preceded by Antonis Manitakis	Minister of the Interior and Administrative Reconstruction; 2015–2016	Succeeded by Panos Skourletis
Preceded by Thodoris Dritsas	Minister of Shipping and Island Policy; 2016–2018	Succeeded by Fotis Kouvelis
