= Mina Gaga =

Greek pulmonologist and politician

- Μίνα Γκάγκα
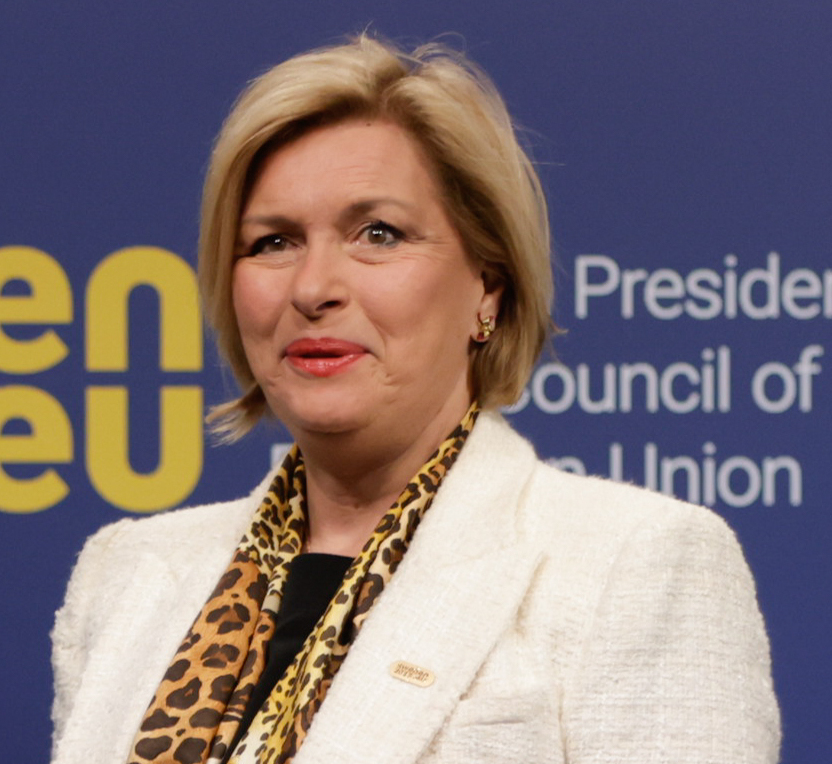
- Mina Gaga in 2023

Alternate Minister for Health Services
- In office 31 August 2021 – 26 May 2023
- Prime Minister: Kyriakos Mitsotakis
- Preceded by: Vasilis Kontozamanis
- Succeeded by: Ireni Agapidaki

Personal details
- Party: New Democracy
- Children: 2
- Education: National and Kapodistrian University of Athens

Asimina Gaga better known as Mina Gaga (Greek: Έλση Χηράτου) is a Greek pulmonologist and politician. She served as Alternate Minister for Health Services of Greece between 2021 and 2023, and previously served as president of the European Respiratory Society.

== Career ==
Gaga studied medicine at the National and Kapodistrian University of Athens, where she completed a PhD and continued her training on pulmonology in London.

She is a clinician and researcher specialising in asthma and lung cancer. She has served as secretary of the European Board for Accreditation in Pulmonology (EBAP) and in 2017 was elected president of the European Respiratory Society; she also chaired the Central Health Council of Greece. Since 2006, Gaga has been director of the 7th Pulmonary Clinic at Sotiria General Hospital. During the COVID-19 pandemic in Greece, she worked in the intensive care units, was involved in campaigns against COVID-19 misinformation and became popular after participating in television programmes. Gaga is also a professor of pulmonology at the University of Athens and has published hundreds of scientific articles.

In the 2019 parliamentary election, Gaga was a candidate for New Democracy, although she was not elected.

Following a government reshuffle, Prime Minister Kyriakos Mitsotakis appointed her on 31 August 2021 as the new Alternate Minister for Health Services. She left the office after the caretaker cabinet of Ioannis Sarmas was sworn in on 26 May 2023.

== Personal life and family ==
Her father, Christos Gaga, was a renowned and pioneering pulmonologist, who was honoured by having the Central Bronchology Laboratory at Sotiria Hospital named after him, whilst her mother, Nafsika Iasonidou, was well known within the Pontic Greek community. She is related to Leonidas Iasonidis, who was her mother's uncle. She is a descendant of victims of the Pontic Greek genocide.

Gaga have two children.
