= Athens A =

Parliamentary constituency of Greece

- Electoral constituency for the Hellenic Parliament
- Athens A within Attica

- Attica within Greece
- Regional unit: Central Athens9
- Administrative region: Attica
- Electorate: 471.447 (2024)

Current Electoral constituency
- Created: 1958
- Number of members: 13 (2023– ) 14 (2015-2019); 17 (2004-2012); 19 (1996-2000); 21 (1985-1993); 22 (1974-1981)
- Created from: Athens

Athens Alpha (Greek: Α΄ Αθηνών) is a parliamentary constituency in Attica represented in the Hellenic Parliament. In its present form it dates to 1958, when the Athens B constituency was split off, leaving Athens A with the Municipality of Athens. It elects fourteen Members of Parliament (MPs) by reinforced proportional representation.

== Election results ==
=== Legislative election ===
1981

1985

6/1989

11/1989

1990

1993

1996

2000

2004

2007

2009

5/2012

6/2012

1/2015

9/2015

2019

5/2023

6/2023

=== European election ===
2014

2019

2024

== Members of Parliament ==
=== 2019–present ===
In the 2019 Greek legislative election, Athens A elected 14 members of parliament:

Name	Party
Konstantinos Bogdanos	Independent
Nikitas Kaklamanis	ND
Olga Kefalogianni	ND
Vasilis Kikilias	ND
Foteini Pipili	ND
Thanos Plevris	ND
Angelos Syrigos	ND
Nikos Filis	SYRIZA
Dimitrios Tzanakopoulos	SYRIZA
Christoforos Vernardakis	SYRIZA
Nikolaos Voutsis	SYRIZA
Liana Kanelli	KKE
Konstantinos Skandalidis	KINAL
Angeliki Adamopoulou	MeRA25

=== Jan 2015–2019 ===
In the September 2015 Greek legislative election, Athens A elected 14 members of parliament:

Name	Party
Alexandros Flampouraris	SYRIZA
Nikos Voutsis	SYRIZA
Nikos Filis	SYRIZA
Christophoros Vernardakis	SYRIZA
Olga Kefalogianni	ND
Vassilis Kikilias	ND
Dora Bakoyannis	ND
Nikitas Kaklamanis	ND
Nikolaos Michaloliakos	XA
Konstantinos Skandalidis	DISI
Liana Kanelli	KKE
Spyros Lykoudis	Potami
Elena Kountoura	ANEL
Marios Georgiadis	EK

=== Jan 2015–Aug 2015 ===
In the January 2015 Greek legislative election, Athens A elected 14 members of parliament:

Name	Partyp
Alexis Tsipras	SYRIZA
Nikos Filis	SYRIZA
Zoe Konstantopoulou	SYRIZA
Gabriel Sakellaridis	SYRIZA
Nikos Voutsis	SYRIZA
Dora Bakoyannis	ND
Nikitas Kaklamanis	ND
Olga Kefalogianni	ND
Vassilis Kikilias	ND
Spyros Lykoudis	Potami
Nikolaos Michaloliakos	XA
Liana Kanelli	KKE
Elena Kountoura	ANEL
Konstantinos Skandalidis	PASOK

=== Jun 2012–Jan 2015 ===
In June 2012 Greek legislative election, Athens A elected 17 members of parliament:

Name	Party
Olga Kefalogianni	ND
Dimitris Avramopoulos	ND
Nikitas Kaklamanis	ND
Foteini Pipili	ND
Vassilis Kikilias	ND
Panagiotis Mitarakis	ND
Prokopis Pavlopoulos	ND
Andreas Psycharis	ND
Alexis Tsipras	SYRIZA
Zoe Konstantopoulou	SYRIZA
Nikolaos Voutsis	SYRIZA
Maria Bolari	SYRIZA
Kostas Skandalidis	PASOK
Elena Kountoura	ANEL
Nikolaos Michaloliakos	XA
Ioannis Panousis	DIMAR
Liana Kanelli	KKE
