= Ministry of the Interior (Greece) =

Government ministry of Greece

- Υπουργείο Εσωτερικών
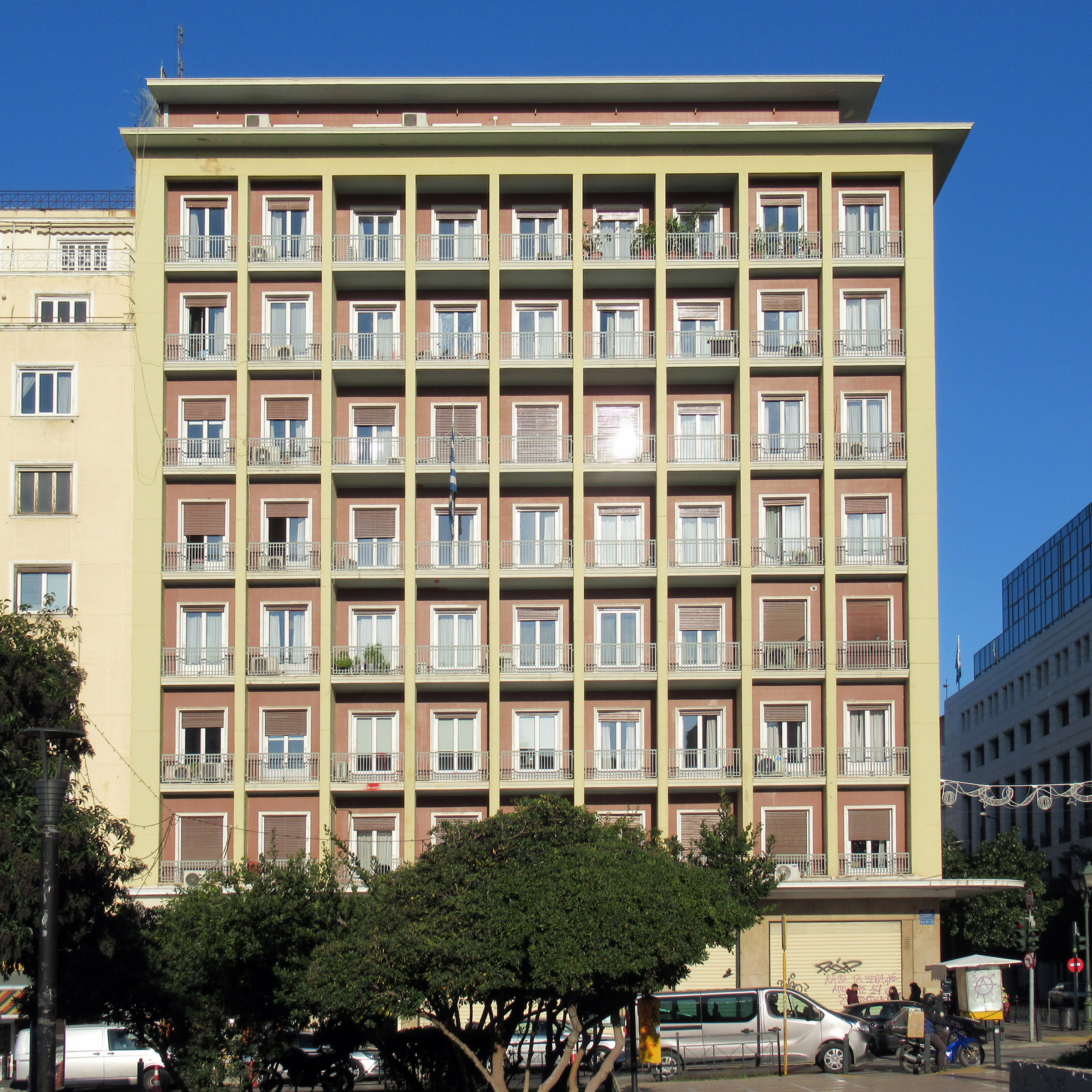
- Headquarters of the Minister at Stadiou str.

Ministry overview
- Formed: January 1822
- Preceding Ministry: Ministry of Interior and Administrative Reorganization
- Jurisdiction: Government of Greece
- Headquarters: 27 Stadiou street, Athens
- Employees: 1.474 (2024)
- Annual budget: 3.820.276.000 € (2025)
- Minister responsible: Thodoris Livanios, Minister of Interior
- Deputy Ministers responsible: Vassilis Spanakis, Deputy Minister for Local Government; Kostas Gioulekas, Deputy Minister for Macedonia and Thrace; Vivi Charalampogianni
- Child agencies: Special Secretariat for the Protection of Pet Animals; General Secretariat of Public Administration; General Secretariat of Citizenship
- Website: www.ypes.gr/en/

The Ministry of the Interior (Greek: Υπουργείο Εσωτερικών) is a government department of Greece. On 15 September 1995, it was merged with the Ministry of the Prime Minister's Office (Υπουργείο Προεδρίας της Κυβέρνησης) to form the Ministry of the Interior, Public Administration and Decentralization (Υπουργείο Εσωτερικών, Δημόσιας Διοίκησης και Αποκέντρωσης). On 19 September 2007, it was merged with the Ministry of Public Order and reverted to its original name. The merger was reversed on 7 October 2009, when the Ministry of the Interior, Decentralization and Electronic Governance (Υπουργείο Εσωτερικών, Αποκέντρωσης και Ηλεκτρονικής Διακυβέρνησης) was formed. On 27 June 2011, a separate Ministry of Administrative Reform and Electronic Governance was created, and the Ministry of the Interior again reverted to its original name. On 27 January 2015, the two were merged with the Ministry of Public Order and Citizen Protection to form the Ministry of the Interior and Administrative Reorganization (Υπουργείο Εσωτερικών και Διοικητικής Ανασυγκρότησης). A separate Ministry of Administrative Reorganization was created on 5 November 2016, and the Ministry of the Interior reverted to its original name for the third time in a decade. A separate Ministry of Citizen Protection was also re-established on 29 August 2018. The Ministry of Administrative Reorganization was reabsorbed by the Ministry of the Interior on 9 July 2019.

== List of ministers ==
=== Interior (1974–1995) ===
Name	Took office	Left office	Party	Notes
Georgios Rallis	24 July 1974	26 July 1974	New Democracy	Karamanlis national unity government
Christoforos Stratos	26 July 1974	9 October 1974	New Democracy	Karamanlis national unity government
Panagiotis Zeppos	9 October 1974	21 November 1974	New Democracy	Karamanlis national unity government
Konstantinos Stefanopoulos	21 November 1974	10 September 1976	New Democracy	
Ippokratis Iordanoglou	10 September 1976	21 October 1977	New Democracy	
Georgios Mitsopoulos	21 October 1977	28 November 1977	New Democracy	
Christoforos Stratos	28 November 1977	17 September 1981	New Democracy	
Georgios D. Daskalakis	17 September 1981	21 October 1981	New Democracy	
Georgios Gennimatas	21 October 1981	17 January 1984	PASOK	
Menios Koutsogiorgas	17 January 1984	22 May 1984	PASOK	
Panagiotis Markopoulos	22 May 1984	21 June 1984	PASOK	
Menios Koutsogiorgas	21 June 1984	9 May 1985	PASOK	
Panagiotis Markopoulos	9 May 1985	5 June 1985	PASOK	
Menios Koutsogiorgas	5 June 1985	5 February 1987	PASOK	26 July 1985 – 25 April 1986 also Minister for Public Order
Emmanouil Papastefanakis	5 February 1987	23 September 1987	PASOK	
Akis Tsochatzopoulos	23 September 1987	2 June 1989	PASOK	17 March 1989 – 2 June 1989 also Minister for Public Order
Panagiotis Markopoulos	2 June 1989	2 July 1989	PASOK	also Minister for Public Order
Nikos Konstantopoulos	2 July 1989	12 October 1989	Synaspismos	Tzannetakis coalition government
Vassilios Skouris	12 October 1989	23 November 1989	Independent	Grivas caretaker government
Theodoros Katrivanos	23 November 1989	11 April 1990	Independent	Zolotas national unity government
Sotirios Kouvelas	11 April 1990	8 August 1991	New Democracy	
Nikolaos Kleitos	8 August 1991	3 December 1992	New Democracy	
Ioannis Kefalogiannis	3 December 1992	14 September 1993	New Democracy	
Ioannis Georgakis	14 September 1993	13 October 1993	Independent	as interim minister for the 1993 election
Akis Tsochatzopoulos	13 October 1993	8 July 1994	PASOK	
Kostas Skandalidis	8 July 1994	15 September 1995	PASOK	

- On 15 September 1995, the Ministry of the Prime Minister's Office and the Ministry of the Interior were merged to become the Ministry of the Interior, Public Administration and Decentralization.

=== Interior, public administration and decentralization (1995–2007) ===
Name	Took office	Left office	Party	Notes
Akis Tsochatzopoulos	15 September 1995	30 August 1996	PASOK	Third Papandreou cabinet until 22 January; First Simitis cabinet thereafter
Vassilios Skouris	30 August 1996	25 September 1996	Independent	as interim minister for the 1996 election
Alekos Papadopoulos	25 September 1996	19 February 1999	PASOK	Second Simitis cabinet
Vasso Papandreou	19 February 1999	20 March 2000	PASOK	Second Simitis cabinet
Georgios Koumantos	20 March 1999	13 April 2000	Independent	as interim minister for the 2000 election
Vasso Papandreou	13 April 2000	24 October 2001	PASOK	Third Cabinet of Costas Simitis
Kostas Skandalidis	24 October 2001	13 February 2004	PASOK	Third Cabinet of Costas Simitis
Nikos Alivizatos	13 February 2004	10 March 2004	Independent	as interim minister for the 2004 election
Prokopis Pavlopoulos	10 March 2004	24 August 2007	New Democracy	First Cabinet of Kostas Karamanlis
Spyridon Flogaitis	24 August 2007	19 September 2007	Independent	as interim minister for the 2007 election

- On 19 September 2007, the Ministry of the Interior, Public Administration and Decentralization was merged with the Ministry of Public Order to form the Ministry of the Interior.

=== Interior (2007–2009) ===
Name	Took office	Left office	Party	Notes
Prokopis Pavlopoulos	19 September 2007	11 September 2009	New Democracy	Second Cabinet of Kostas Karamanlis
Spyridon Flogaitis	11 September 2009	7 October 2009	Independent	as interim minister for the 2009 election

=== Interior, decentralization and electronic governance (2009–2011) ===
Name	Took office	Left office	Party	Notes
Giannis Ragousis	7 October 2009	27 June 2011	PASOK	Cabinet of George Papandreou

=== Interior (2011–2015) ===
Name	Took office	Left office	Party	Notes
Haris Kastanidis	27 June 2011	11 November 2011	PASOK	Papandreou cabinet
Tasos Giannitsis	11 November 2011	17 May 2012	PASOK	Papademos national unity government
Antonis Manitakis	17 May 2012	21 June 2012	Independent	Pikrammenos caretaker government
Evripidis Stylianidis	21 June 2012	25 June 2013	New Democracy	Cabinet of Antonis Samaras
Giannis Michelakis	25 June 2013	10 June 2014	New Democracy	Cabinet of Antonis Samaras
Argyris Dinopoulos	10 June 2014	31 December 2014	New Democracy	Cabinet of Antonis Samaras
Michail Theocharidis	31 December 2014	27 January 2015	Independent	as interim minister for the January 2015 election

=== Interior and administrative reorganization (2015–2016) ===
Name	Took office	Left office	Party	Notes
Nikos Voutsis	27 January 2015	28 August 2015	Syriza	First Cabinet of Alexis Tsipras
Antonis Manitakis	28 August 2015	23 September 2015	Independent	Thanou caretaker government
Panagiotis Kouroumblis	23 September 2015	5 November 2016	Syriza	Second Cabinet of Alexis Tsipras

=== Interior (since 2016) ===
Name	Took office	Left office	Party	Notes
Panos Skourletis	5 November 2016	29 August 2018	Syriza	Second Tsipras cabinet
Alexis Haritsis	29 August 2018	13 June 2019	Syriza	Second Tsipras cabinet
Antonis Roupakiotis	13 June 2019	9 July 2019	Independent	As interim minister for the 2019 election
Takis Theodorikakos	9 July 2019	5 January 2021	New Democracy	First Cabinet of Kyriakos Mitsotakis
Makis Voridis	5 January 2021	23 April 2023	New Democracy	First Cabinet of Kyriakos Mitsotakis
Calliope Spanou	23 April 2023	27 June 2023	Independent	As interim minister for the 2023 elections
Niki Kerameus	27 June 2023	14 June 2024	New Democracy	Second Cabinet of Kyriakos Mitsotakis
Thodoris Livanios	14 June 2024	Incumbent	New Democracy	Second Cabinet of Kyriakos Mitsotakis
