= Notis Mitarachi =

Greek politician (born 1972)

- Νότης Μηταράκης
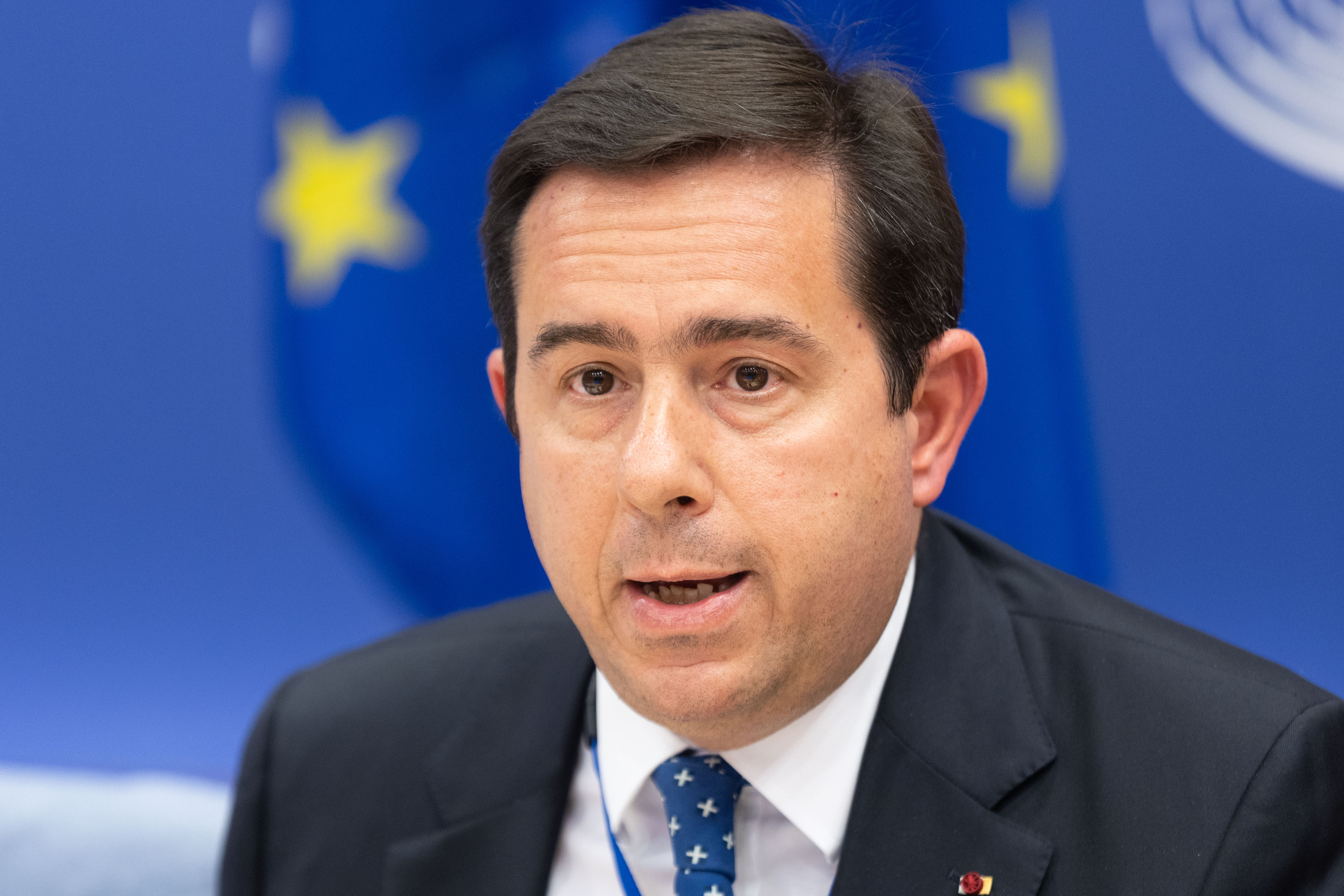

Minister of Citizen Protection
- In office 27 June 2023 – 28 July 2023
- Prime Minister: Kyriakos Mitsotakis

Minister of Migration & Asylum
- In office 15 January 2020 – 26 May 2023
- Prime Minister: Kyriakos Mitsotakis

Deputy Minister of Labour and Social Security
- In office 9 July 2019 – 15 Jan 2020
- Prime Minister: Kyriakos Mitsotakis

Deputy Minister of Economic Development and Competitiveness
- In office 21 June 2012 – 27 Jan 2015
- Prime Minister: Antonis Samaras

Member of the Hellenic Parliament for Chios
- Incumbent
- Assumed office 26 Jan 2015

Member of the Hellenic Parliament for Athens A
- In office 6 May 2012 – 25 Jan 2015

Personal details
- Born: 7 October 1972 (age 54) Athens, Greece
- Party: New Democracy
- Spouse: Maria Dourida
- Children: 1 daughter
- Education: University of Nicosia; INSEAD; University of Oxford; The American College of Greece
- Awards: Top Pan-European, Buy-side Analyst, 2005, Thomson Extel Survey Grand Decoration with Shash (Grand Cross) of Honor in Gold of the Republic of Austria (2022) Knight Grand Cross of the Order of St. Agatha of the Republic of San Marino (2022) Grand Officer of the Order of the Crown (Belgium) Grand Commander of the Order of the Apostle & Evangelist Mark, Patriarchate of Alexandria and All Africa (2013)
- Website: http://www.mitarakis.gr

Panagiotis Mitarachi (Greek: Παναγιώτης (Νότης) Μηταράκης (Note: Panagiotis (Notis) Mitarakis)), known as Notis Mitarachi (born 1972), is a Greek politician who served as Minister of Citizen Protection (2023), Minister of Migration and Asylum (2020-2023), Deputy Minister of Labour & Social Affairs (2019-2020) and Deputy Minister of Development and Competitiveness (2012-2015). He is a member of the Hellenic Parliament for Chios with New Democracy. He was a President of the Council of the European Union (Foreign Affairs – Trade) during the Hellenic Presidency.

== Early life ==
He was born in 1972 in Athens. He is a graduate of University of Nicosia (PhD), INSEAD (MBA), Oxford University (MSc in Industrial Relations, Green Templeton College) and The American College of Greece (BSc in Business Administration). He is a Fellow of the Chartered Management Institute and a Chartered Financial Analyst (CFA) Charterholder.

== Career ==
His first appointment was in London, in 1998, as an investment executive, specializing in industrial investments in Eastern Europe. In 2003, he joined Fidelity International as a research analyst and was promoted to Director of Research.

=== Politics ===
From August 2022, he serves as permanent member of the National Security Governmental Council (KYSEA).

During the Hellenic Presidency of the Council (first Semester 2014) he served as President of the Council of the European Union – Foreign Affairs (Trade).

From 2012 to 2015 he served as Deputy Minister for Economic Development and Competitiveness, responsible for strategic and private-sector investments, public-private partnerships, exports and international trade relations.

He served as Alternate Governor in the Board of Governors of the World Bank and the European Bank for Reconstruction & Development (EBRD) and as Governor in the Board of Governors of the Black Sea Trade & Development Bank (BSTB).

In 2010, he was appointed Alternate Shadow Finance Minister. In 2011 he was elected Regional Councilor for Attica and was appointed Member of the Political Assembly of the European People's Party (EPP). In 2012 he was elected Member of Parliament for Athens A and in 2015 Member of Parliament for Chios. From March 2015 – January 2016 he served as Shadow Minister for Shipping and the Aegean for New Democracy Party (EPP).

During the 16th Parliamentary Term, he was a member of the Standing Committee on Production and Trade and the Special Permanent Committee on Equality, Youth and Human Rights in the Hellenic Parliament.

During the 17th Parliamentary Term, he was 1st vice-chairman of the Special Permanent Committee on Environmental Protection, member of the Subcommittee on water resources, member of the Standing Committee on Social Affairs, member of the Committee on the Monitoring of the Social Security System, Vice-chairman on Greek - UK Friendship Group and member of the Greece - United Arab Emirates and Greece - Poland Friendship Groups in the Hellenic Parliament.

He was member of the Investigation Committee on examining the legality of political party lending and the lending of mass media companies from the country's financial institutions and member of the Investigation Committee on examining Health Scandals during the years 1997–2014.

In November 2016, he was appointed Shadow Minister for Social Security (New Democracy Party – EPP). In 2019, he was appointed as Representative of the Parliamentary Assembly (PACE).

== Recognition ==
In 2023, he has been awarded Honorary Doctorate (DBA Hon) from the University of Bolton.

In 2022, he has been awarded with the Grand Decoration with Shash (Grand Cross) of Honor in Gold of the Republic of Austria, the Knight Grand Cross of the Order of St. Agatha of the Republic of San Marino and the Grand Commander of the Order of the Crown of the Kingdom of Belgium by His Majesty the King of Belgium.

In 2013, he has been awarded as Grand Commander of the Order of the Apostle & Evangelist Mark by the Patriarchate of Alexandria and All Africa.

In 2005 he was voted Top Pan-European, Buy-side Analyst for the retailing industry (Thomson Extel Survey). He has also served as Chairman of the Hellenic Bankers Association, UK, and as a Member of the Board of Directors of the CFA Society UK.
