= Vasilis Kikilias =

Greek politician and basketball player

Vasilis Kikilias MP
- Βασίλης Κικίλιας
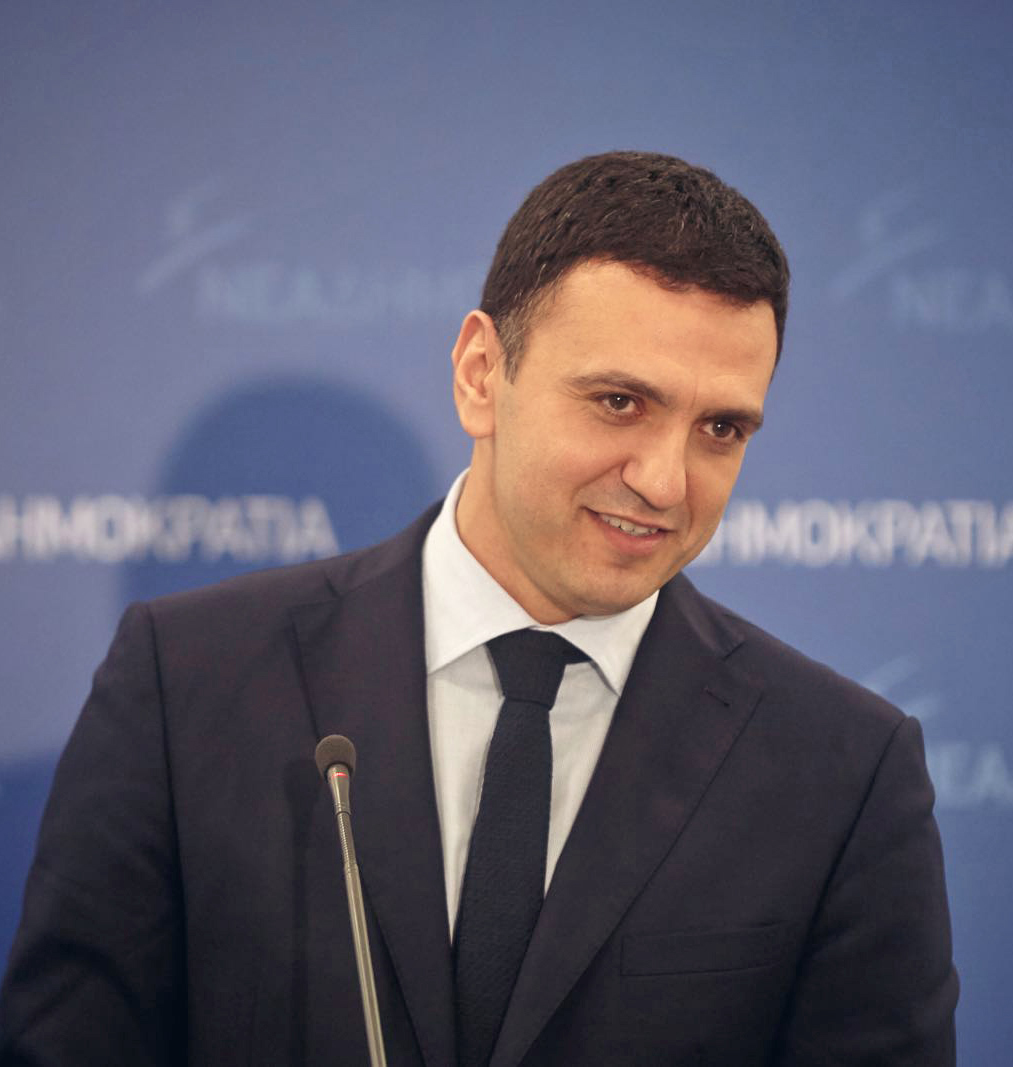
- Kikilias in 2017

Minister of Maritime Affairs and Insular Policy
- Incumbent
- Assumed office 15 March 2025
- Prime Minister: Kyriakos Mitsotakis
- Preceded by: Christos Stylianides

Minister for Tourism
- In office 31 August 2021 – 26 May 2023
- Prime Minister: Kyriakos Mitsotakis
- Preceded by: Harry Theoharis
- Succeeded by: Ioanna Dretta

Minister for Health
- In office 9 July 2019 – 31 August 2021
- Preceded by: Andreas Xanthos
- Succeeded by: Thanos Plevris

Minister for Public Order and Citizen Protection
- In office 10 June 2014 – 27 January 2015
- Prime Minister: Antonis Samaras
- Preceded by: Nikos Dendias

Member of the Hellenic Parliament for Athens A
- Incumbent
- Assumed office 6 May 2012

Minister of Climate Crisis and Civil Protection
- Incumbent
- Assumed office 27 June 2023

Personal details
- Born: 15 May 1974 (age 52) Athens, Greece
- Party: New Democracy
- Spouse: Jenny Balatsinou
- Children: 1
- Education: University of Athens
- Website: kikilias.gr

Vasilis Kikilias (Greek: Βασίλης Κικίλιας; born 15 May 1974) is a Greek politician, currently Minister of Maritime Affairs and Insular Policy in the second cabinet of Kyriakos Mitsotakis.

He is a member of the Hellenic Parliament for New Democracy in the Athens A constituency. He is also a retired professional basketball player who played for Panionios B.C., Ionikos Nikaias B.C., AEK B.C., Apollon Patras B.C. and the Greece men's national basketball team.

== Basketball career ==
Kikilias started his basketball career with Panionios BC and Ionikos Nikaias, and he then moved to AEK Athens. He was a member of the AEK team that won the 2000 "Saporta" European Champion Cup and the 2002 Greek Basketball A1 League. He was also a member of the Greece National team.

== Basketball career achievements ==
- Had 6 caps and scored 76 points with the Greece men's national basketball team.
- Won the silver medal at the 1991 Eurobasket for Cadets.
- Won the Greek Cup in 1991 with Panionios.
- Won the Greek League championship in 2002 with AEK.
- Won the Greek Cup in 2000 & 2001 with AEK.
- Won the Saporta Cup in 2000 with AEK.

== Political career ==
In 2006 he was elected municipal councillor of the City of Athens. In 2007 he was appointed by the Mayor of Athens as President of Youth & Sports Organization, a position he held until 2011. In 2007 he was elected as a member of the Political Committee of New Democracy and he has been a member ever since. In local elections of 2010, he was nominated prefect in the Region of Attica, winning second place with a share of 47.50% and was the head of the major opposition of the Attica Region until 2010.

He has been elected to the Hellenic Parliament at every election since May 2012. From 10 June 2014 to 27 January 2015, he served as Minister for Public Order and Citizen Protection in the Cabinet of Antonis Samaras. He was party spokesman from 18 November 2016 to 9 October 2017. He served as Minister for Health from 9 July 2019 to 31 August 2021, when he was appointed Minister for Tourism by Prime Minister Kyriakos Mitsotakis.
