= Niki Kerameus =

Greek politician

- Νίκη Κεραμέως
- Kerameus in 2026

Minister of Labour and Social Security
- Incumbent
- Assumed office 14 June 2024
- Prime Minister: Kyriakos Mitsotakis
- Preceded by: Domna Michailidou

Minister of Interior
- In office 27 June 2023 – 14 June 2024
- Preceded by: Calliope Spanou
- Succeeded by: Theodoros Livanios

Minister of Education and Religious Affairs
- In office 9 July 2019 – 26 May 2023
- Preceded by: Kostas Gavroglou
- Succeeded by: Christos Kittas

Personal details
- Born: 18 July 1980 (age 46) Thessaloniki, Greece
- Party: New Democracy
- Children: 2
- Education: Sorbonne University (LLB); Harvard University (LLM)
- Website: metiniki.gr

Niki Kerameus (Greek: Νίκη Κεραμέως, Níki Keraméos, [ˈnici keraˈmeos]) is a Greek lawyer and politician serving as Minister of Labour and Social Security since June 2024. She previously served as Minister for the Interior of the Hellenic Republic from June 2023 to June 2024, appointed by Kyriakos Mitsotakis. Prior to that, she was Minister of Education and Religious Affairs from July 2019 to May 2023. She is a member of the New Democracy party.

== Early life ==
She was born in Thessaloniki on 18 July 1980. She is the daughter of lawyer and professor Konstantinos Kerameus and Marilena Sarri, and has a brother named Dimitris. It is claimed that the origin of her family is from the Byzantine family of Keramea. Kerameus studied law at Panthéon-Sorbonne University and Harvard Law School and is a member of the Athens and New York Bar Associations.

== Political career ==
She was first elected Member of Parliament in the elections of January 2015 and again in September 2015. During this time she was a member of the "Special permanent committee on the penitentiary system and other forms of confinement of detainees" and the "Standing Committee on Public Administration, Public Order and Justice." Kerameus was reelected as parliamentary representative for the B1 North Athens electoral constituency in the elections of 2019.

=== Minister of Education ===
In July 2019, Kerameus became Minister of Education and Religious Affairs. On 26 May 2023 she left the position and was succeeded by acting minister Christos Kittas.

=== Minister of the Interior ===
In June 2023, she became Minister of Interior, a post she would hold until June 2024.

=== Minister of Labour ===
After a cabinet reshuffle, she became Minister of Labour and Social Security in June 2024.

== Personal life ==
She is married to Dimitris Loukas and has two boys. Besides Greek, she also speaks English, French and German.
