= Calliope Spanou =

- Καλλιόπη Σπανού
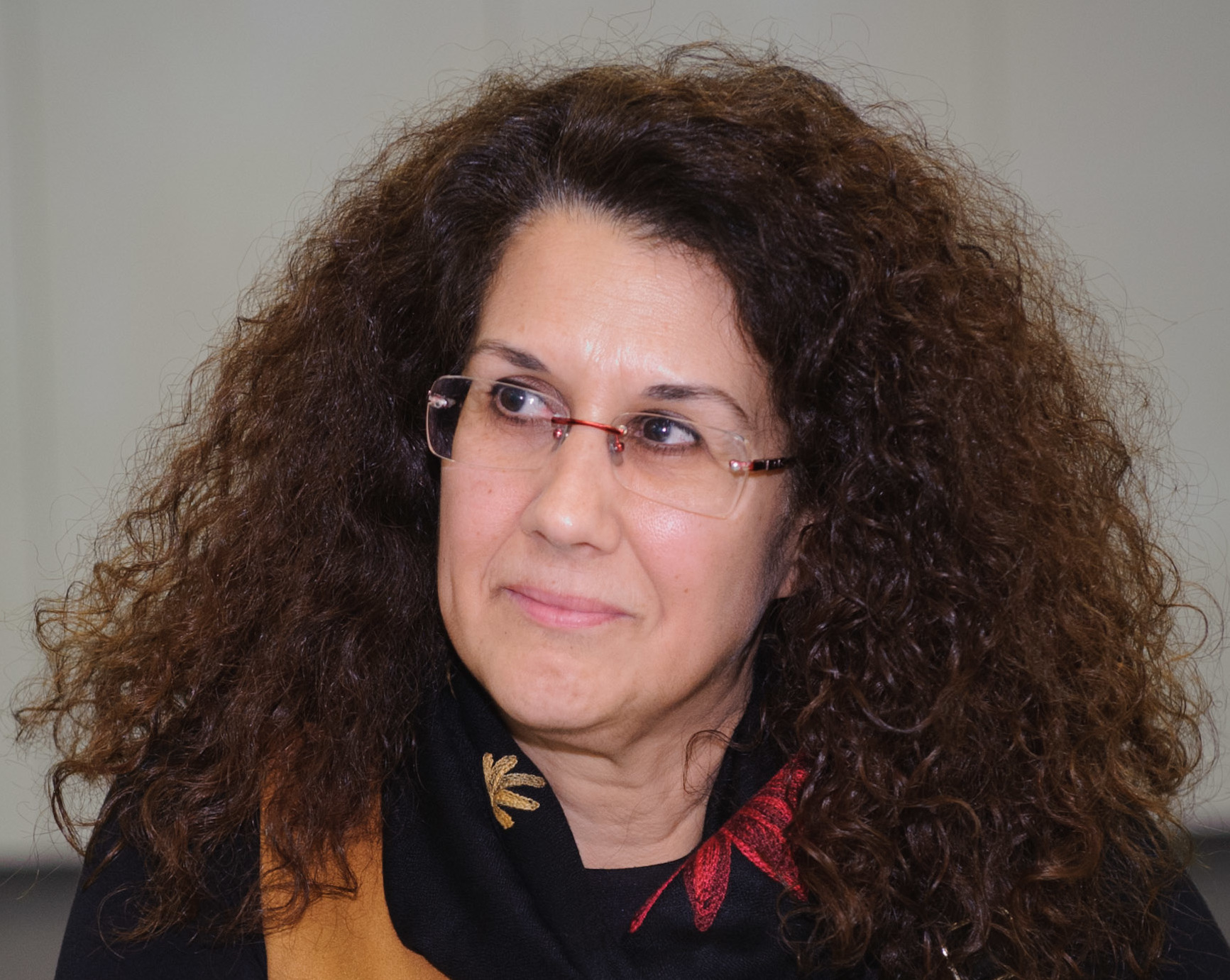
- Spanou in 2012

Minister of Interior of Greece
- In office 23 April 2023 – 27 June 2023
- Prime Minister: Kyriakos Mitsotakis; Ioannis Sarmas
- Preceded by: Makis Voridis
- Succeeded by: Niki Kerameus

Greek Ombudsman
- In office September 2010 – 2 November 2015
- Preceded by: Giorgos Kaminis
- Succeeded by: Vassilis Karydis (interim)

Personal details
- Education: University of Athens; University of Picardie Jules Verne

Calliope Spanou is a Greek academic who served from 2011 to 2015 as the Greek Ombudsman. She is currently a professor of administrative science at the National and Kapodistrian University of Athens. On 23 April 2023, she was sworn in as Minister for the Interior in a caretaker capacity, tasked with overseeing the election due to be held on 21 May.

== Education ==
Spanou studied public law and political science at the National and Kapodistrian University of Athens and went on to study administrative science (Doctorat d'État) at the University of Picardie Jules Verne in Amiens, France. During her university studies she was awarded two scholarships: one from the M. Stassinopoulos Foundation and another from the Ministry of National Economy Technical Cooperation Programme (ΝΑΤΟ). Her doctoral dissertation was honoured by the French government with a publishing allowance. Speaking later of her time in France, she said: "You were a second-class person. The way they treated you – in their minds, we were immigrants."

== Academic career ==
In 1989, Spanou began teaching at the faculty of political science and public administration of the National and Kapodistrian University of Athens. She has also taught at the University of Picardie Jules Verne, the Panthéon-Assas University and the Versailles Saint-Quentin-en-Yvelines University. She has taught for several years at the National School of Public Administration in Greece and has also advised the National Centre of Public Administration and the Organisation for Economic Co-operation and Development.

Her current research interests include public policy, civil service, citizen-administration relations and the Europeanization of public administration. She has published papers and books in Greek, French and English.

== Public career ==
Spanou served as a deputy ombudsman for state-citizen relations from 2003 to 2011. She became the acting Ombudsman in September 2010 following the resignation of Giorgos Kaminis. She was elected as Ombudsman by the Hellenic Parliament on 13 May 2011 and took office on 13 July 2011. She stepped down from her role on 2 November 2015 and was succeeded, on an interim basis, by Vassilis Karydis, a deputy ombudsman.

== Personal life ==
Spanou is married to a German economist, Jens Bastian.
