= Theodoros Livanios =

Greek politician (born 1977)

- Θεόδωρος Λιβάνιος

Minister of the Interior
- Incumbent
- Assumed office 14 June 2024
- Prime Minister: Kyriakos Mitsotakis
- Preceded by: Niki Kerameus

Personal details
- Born: 1977 (age 48–49)
- Party: New Democracy

Theodoros Livanios (Greek: Θεόδωρος Λιβάνιος; born 1977) is a Greek politician of New Democracy serving as minister of the interior since 2024. He previously served as general secretary of the Municipality of Athens from 2011 to 2014, as deputy minister of the interior from 2019 to 2021 and from 2023 to 2024, as deputy minister to the prime minister in 2021, and as deputy minister of digital governance until 2023.
