= Evripidis Stylianidis =

Greek politician

- Ευριπίδης Στυλιανίδης
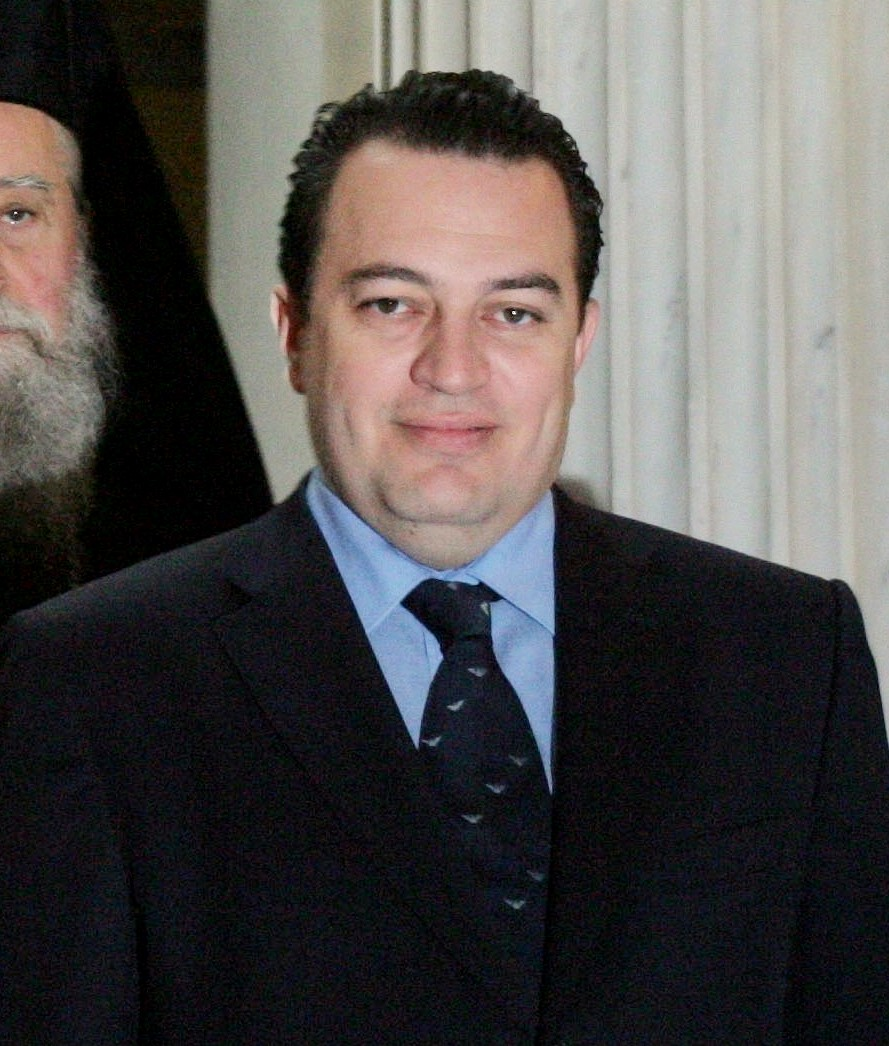

Minister of the Interior
- In office 21 June 2012 – 25 June 2013
- Prime Minister: Antonis Samaras
- Preceded by: Antonis Manitakis
- Succeeded by: Giannis Michelakis

Personal details
- Born: 8 April 1966 (age 60) Maroneia, Greece
- Party: New Democracy
- Education: Democritus University of Thrace; University of Hamburg

Evripidis Stylianidis (Greek: Ευριπίδης Στυλιανίδης, also transliterated Evripidis Stilianides) is a Greek politician who has served as Minister for the Interior, Minister for Education and Minister for Transport and Communications. He is a member of New Democracy.

== Personal life and education ==
Evripidis Stylianidis was born on 8 April 1966 in Maroneia, near Komotini in the Rhodope regional unit of Thrace.

Between 1984 and 1989 he studied at the Law School of the Democritus University of Thrace in Komotini, graduating with a Bachelor's degree. Between 1991 and 1994 he studied at the Law School of the University of Hamburg, graduating with a PhD in constitutional law, before serving in the Artillery Corps of the Hellenic Army between 1994 and 1995.

He is married to Stergioula Papachristou and speaks Greek and German.

== Professional life ==
From 1991 until 1994, Stylianidis worked at the Greek General Consulate in Hamburg, Germany, cooperating with the Greek Foreign Ministry. Between 1995 and 1996 he was an advisor to the president of the New Democracy political party in Greece in issues concerning youth affairs and cultural diplomacy. From 1997 until 1998, as a European Public Law Center (EPLC) fellow, he taught in the Master's degree programme in public law at the Law School of the National and Capodistrian University of Athens. From 1997 until 2000, Stylianidis was a researcher at European Public Law Center (EPLC).

== Political life ==
Evripidis Stylianidis first entered politics in 1994 with New Democracy as a Member of the European Parliament nominee.

In 1996 he ran for parliament, but the election law at the time did not enable his party to elect an MP in the Rhodope constituency, albeit it is claimed that he received the most votes. In 2000 he was elected a Member of the Parliament of the Hellenes for the Rhodope Prefecture, and re-elected in 2004. In 2001, he was appointed New Democracy's alternative coordinator for foreign affairs, a position he held until 2004.

He has also been a member of the NATO Parliamentary Assembly and vice president of the Greece–Brazil and Greece–Germany and member of the Greece–Russia Parliamentary Friendship Committees.

In the January 2015 election he won a seat in the parliament. But lost his seat in the September 2015 election.

== Ministerial positions ==
On 19 September 2007, Evripidis Stylianidis became the Minister for National Education and Religious Affairs.

After a government reshuffle, he was appointed Minister for Transport and Communications on 8 January 2009. After the elections of 7 October 2009, he is a parliament member with the main opposition party of New Democracy.

Political offices
Preceded by Marietta Giannakou	Minister of National Education and Religious Affairs; 2007–2009	Succeeded by Aris Spiliotopoulos
Preceded by Kostis Chatzidakis	Minister of Transport and Communications; 2009	Succeeded by Dimitris Reppas as Minister of Infrastructure, Transport and Networks
Preceded by Antonis Manitakis	Minister of the Interior; 2012–2013	Succeeded by Giannis Michelakis
