= Leonidas Iasonidis =

Greek activist (1884–1959)

- Born: 1884; Poulantzaki, Pontus, Turkey
- Died: 1959 (aged 74–75)
- Occupation: Political activist

Leonidas Iasonidis (1884–1959) was a Pontic Greek political activist born in Bulancak in Pontus, Turkey.

== Early life ==
Iasonidis studied at the Kerasus High School and at the Phrontisterion of Trapezous. He studied law in Istanbul and graduated with honours. He then went to Paris to further his law studies and graduated in 1915. In Greece, Iasonidis began a very successful career in politics. He played a vital role in having the icon of the Virgin Mary (Panagia Soumela) returned to its rightful owners in Greece.

During World War I, he left Paris via Romania and arrived in Rostov, Russia, where he came in contact with the Greek communities of the Caucasus. In 1917, the Caucasus and Crimean regions were heavily populated with Pontic Greek refugees who had earlier fled Turkey to avoid the Turkish massacres. Iasonidis was able to gain the support of the 1,500,000 Pontic Greeks, and as the representative of the National Council of Greek communities, he travelled to Paris to join Eleftherios Venizelos in calling for the independence of Greek Pontus. These efforts resulted in the Turkish government calling for his arrest, but they were unable to capture him. Turkey instead arrested and executed his 27-year-old brother.

== Sources ==
- The Encyclopaedia of Pontic Hellenism
