= Foreign involvement in the Sudanese civil war (2023–present) =

Sudan Countries supplying arms to the SAF Countries supplying arms to the RSF

Foreign involvement in the Sudanese civil war has been rampant, with many countries having been involved heavily in supplying aid and arms to either side of the war. Sudan's de facto army Sudanese Armed Forces (SAF) has mostly received funding and military support from countries like Saudi Arabia, Turkey, Russia, Iran and Egypt. While its rival, the Rapid Support Forces (RSF), has received major funding from countries like the United Arab Emirates (UAE), Kenya, Uganda, Chad and Ethiopia. Nordic Africa Institute describes the war as shaped not only by internal rivalries but also by the involvement of external actors providing financial, military, and diplomatic support to the warring parties, contributing to dynamics resembling a proxy war.

In June 2024, a briefing by Amnesty International stated that the constant flow of foreign weapons is fueling the war and breaching the Darfur arms embargo. The organization found that the recently manufactured or transferred weapons and ammunition were being imported in large quantities into Sudan from China, Russia, Turkey, Yemen, the UAE and Serbia. The weapons supply has impacted the war by causing massive civilian displacement and a humanitarian crisis in Sudan. Both warring sides were using Chinese-manufactured advanced drone jammers, mortars and anti-materiel rifles. The RSF were also reported to be using recently manufactured armoured personnel carriers (APCs) from the UAE.

== Foreign arms supplies and aid to the SAF ==
=== Egypt ===
On 15 April 2023, RSF forces claimed, via Twitter, to have taken Egyptian troops prisoner near Merowe, and a military plane carrying markings of the Egyptian Air Force (EAF). Initially, no official explanation was given for the Egyptian soldiers' presence, while Egypt and Sudan have had military cooperation due to diplomatic tensions with Ethiopia. Later on, the Egyptian Armed Forces stated that around 200 of its soldiers were in Sudan to conduct exercises with the Sudanese military. Around that time, the SAF reportedly encircled RSF forces in Merowe airbase. As a result, the Egyptian Armed Forces announced that it was following the situation as a precaution for the safety of its personnel. The RSF later stated that it would cooperate in repatriating the soldiers to Egypt. On 19 April, the RSF stated that it had moved the soldiers to Khartoum and would hand them over when the "appropriate opportunity" arose. Of the captured Egyptian troops, 177 were released and flown back to Egypt aboard three Egyptian military planes that took off from Khartoum airport later in the day. The remaining 27 soldiers, who were from the Egyptian Air Force, were sheltered at the Egyptian embassy and later evacuated.

On 16 April 2023, the RSF claimed that its troops in Port Sudan were attacked by foreign aircraft and issued a warning against any foreign interference. According to former CIA analyst Cameron Hudson, Egyptian fighter jets were a part of these bombing campaigns against the RSF, and Egyptian special forces units have been deployed and are providing intelligence and tactical support to the SAF. The Wall Street Journal said that Egypt had sent fighter jets and pilots to support the Sudanese military. On 17 April, satellite imagery obtained by The War Zone revealed that one Egyptian Air Force MiG-29M2 fighter jet had been destroyed and two others had been damaged or destroyed while stationed at Merowe Airbase. A Sudanese Air Force Guizhou JL-9 was among the destroyed aircraft. After initial confusion, the RSF accepted the explanation that Egyptian combat and support personnel were conducting exercises with the Sudanese military before the outbreak of hostilities.

Egypt's position is driven primarily by national security concerns, including stability along its southern border, Nile water security, and the regional balance of power. Cairo has long viewed the SAF as its most reliable institutional partner, reflecting decades of cooperation on border security and counterterrorism. As the RSF expanded its capabilities during the war, Egypt increasingly perceived it as a destabilising force, particularly if it advanced toward northern Sudan. These concerns, heightened by tensions with Ethiopia over the Grand Ethiopian Renaissance Dam (GERD), have reinforced Egypt's preference for a unified Sudanese state and its opposition to fragmentation.

Since at least mid-2025, drones launched from an air base in Egypt’s Western Desert, along the border with Sudan, have supported the SAF by striking RSF targets. This marked Egypt’s direct entry into the war; before this, support for the Sudanese government was primarily diplomatic.

=== Eritrea ===
Eritrea is seen as an ally of the SAF, providing military support in Sudan's eastern borders. During a state visit to Asmara in November 2024, al-Burhan thanked President Isaias Afwerki for Eritrea's support to the SAF. Eritrea's support is seen as a counterbalance to Eritrean opposition groups and their possibility of growing in influence under the advance of the RSF in Sudan's eastern border. President Afwerki has implied Eritrea's military readiness to respond in the case of an RSF advance to its borders.

=== Iran ===
In October 2023, Iran and Sudan resumed diplomatic relations, aligning Tehran with the SAF. A June 2024 BBC investigation revealed that Iran violated the UN arms embargo by supplying drones to both sides. Analysts see this move as part of Iran's strategy to counter UAE influence in Sudan and secure access to the Red Sea. Although Sudanese officials denied receiving Iranian aid, multiple sources — including Reuters — confirmed its impact on the battlefield.

=== Libya ===
On April 2, 2026, the head of the Libyan Army (which is aligned with the Government of National Unity) al-Namroush met with SAF representatives and offered logistical and mechanical support to the Sudanese army.

=== Pakistan ===
In January 2026, Pakistan and Sudan entered the final stages of a $1.5 billion defense deal under which Pakistan would supply 10 Karakoram-8 light attack jets, more than 200 UAVs and Kamikaze drones along with air defence systems.

In April, reports emerged of the deal being cancelled due to Saudi objections over who was to fund it. However in early August 2026, Heavy Industries Taxila delivered approximately 100 Mohafiz-V armored cars to the SAF.

=== Qatar ===
Qatar has maintained a long-standing bilateral military relationship with Sudan. Since the start of the war, it has aligned itself with the SAF, in part to counter the UAE, which has supported the rival RSF. Doha has also tried to discreetly supply the SAF with weapons during this conflict, with reports indicating that Qatar provided at least six Chinese warplanes to the SAF.

=== Russia ===
For much of the Sudanese civil war Russia has sent weapons to both the RSF and SAF. This began to shift during mid-2024, with the Russian government beginning to favour the SAF, concurrent with Russia–SAF discussions around the construction of a Russian naval base north of Port Sudan. The same year, Russia began delivering large quantities of weapons, jet components, fuel, and drones, to the Sudanese government in its effort against the RSF, allowing the SAF to recapture parts of the capital, Khartoum, from the RSF.

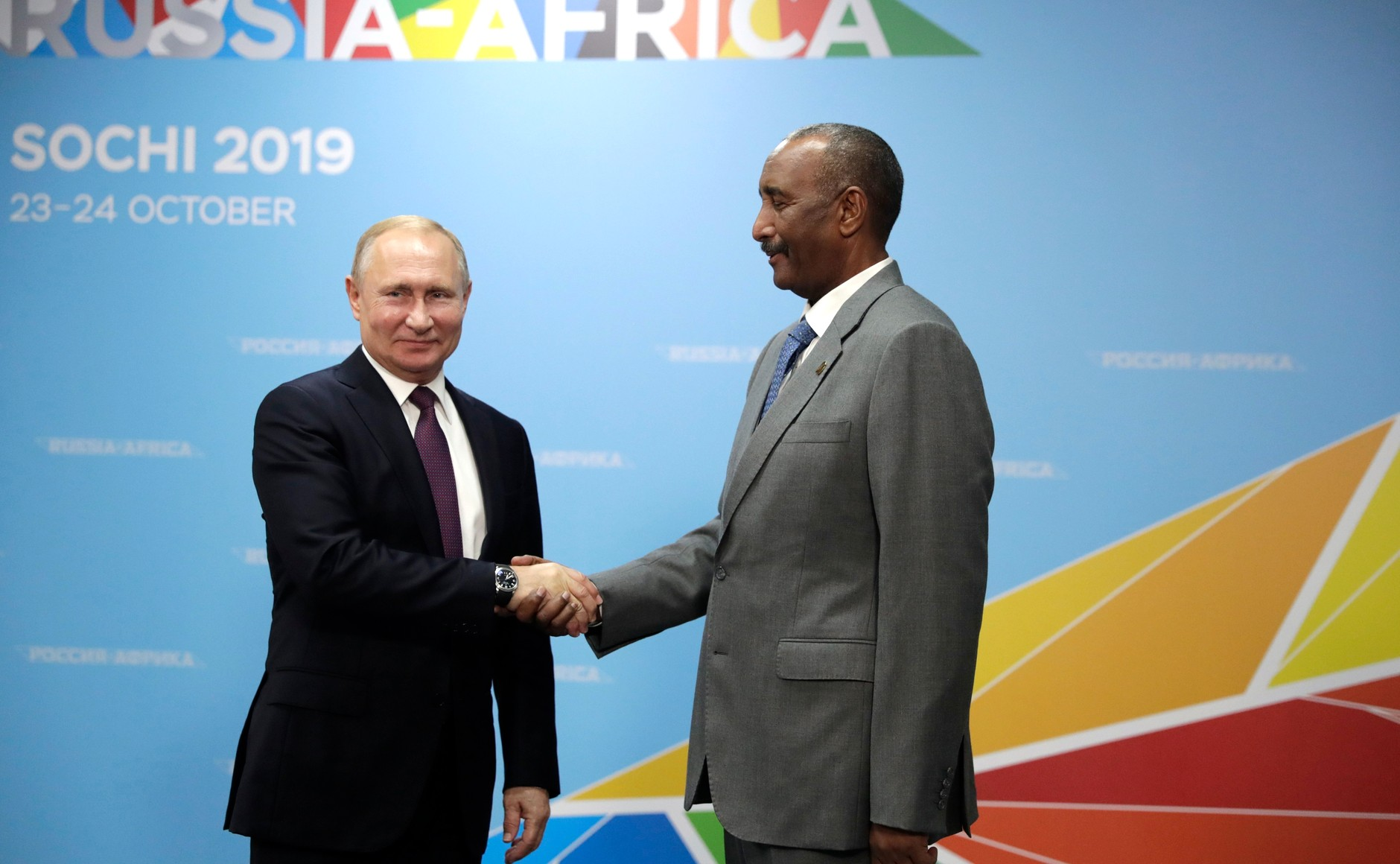
President of Russia Vladimir Putin & Chairman of the Sovereignty Council of Sudan Abdel Fattah al-Burhan in October 2019

Russia's involvement is also driven by broader strategic and economic interests, including efforts to secure a naval presence on the Red Sea and access to Sudanese gold resources. These resources have been particularly valuable in mitigating the impact of western sanctions. In addition to its military engagement, Russia has used its diplomatic position, including at the United Nations, to protect its interests and resist ceasefire initiatives.

=== Saudi Arabia ===
Saudi Arabia has provided military support and financial aid to the SAF, although it officially denies doing so, in an effort to counterbalance the influence of the UAE, which supports the RSF. Several analyses have consequently described the conflict as a proxy war between the two Gulf states.

Saudi Arabia's engagement is also shaped by security concerns related to the Red Sea crisis and a preference for a unified Sudanese state capable of containing armed groups and preventing regional spillover. Saudi policy has remained broadly aligned with the SAF and coordinated with Egypt, reflecting shared concerns over fragmentation and border instability. Its support has largely taken diplomatic and political forms, avoiding direct military escalation.

In March 2025, al-Burhan visited Saudi Arabia in his first trip outside Sudan since the SAF retook Khartoum. There, he thanked Saudi support for Sudanese unity and the fight against the RSF.

=== Somalia ===
The government of Somalia, led by Hassan Sheikh Mohamud, has maintained military ties with the SAF during the war, agreeing to provide military training and resources to the Sudanese forces. In January 2025, the Somali government agreed to host SAF troops at Camp TURKSOM for training, as part of a plan jointly supported by the governments of Somalia, Turkey, Egypt and Eritrea to bolster military support to the SAF.

=== Turkey ===
Turkey's engagement reflects a combination of strategic ambition and commercial interests in Sudan and the wider Red Sea region. In addition to its role as a security partner, Ankara has sought to expand its economic footprint, including potential access to mineral resources and port infrastructure. This dual approach, combining defence cooperation with diplomatic outreach, has allowed Turkey to increase its influence while maintaining flexibility in its relations with different actors.

Turkey appears to be engaging with both sides, notably through Baykar, owned by President Recep Tayyip Erdoğan's son-in-law, selling $120 million worth of weapons, 6 TB2 UCAV's, 3 ground control stations and 600 warheads to the SAF in 2023, violating US and EU sanctions. Meanwhile, Arca Defense, another Turkish company, had extensive contact with RSF's procurement officer, though it denies selling weapons, adding complexity to Turkey's role. Turkey's interests include expanding military and diplomatic ties in the Horn of Africa, offering to mediate between Sudan and the UAE in December 2024.

=== Ukraine ===
On 19 September 2023, CNN reported that it was "likely" that Ukrainian special forces were behind a series of drone strikes and a ground operation directed against the Wagner Group-backed RSF near Khartoum on 8 September. Kyrylo Budanov, the chief of the Ukrainian Main Directorate of Intelligence, stated in an interview on 22 September that he could neither confirm or deny Ukraine's involvement in the conflict, but said that Ukraine "will be seeking and hunting down Russian military criminals ... sooner or later".

On 6 November 2023, the Kyiv Post released drone footage of what it claimed was Ukrainian special forces attacking Wagner Group personnel in an unidentified urban area in Sudan with an explosive projectile, which was believed to have been taken about two weeks before its publication. Two months later on 30 January 2024, the Kyiv Post reported that Ukrainian special forces had launched three drone strikes targeting the Wagner Group and other Russian organisations in Sudan as well as their Sudanese partners in the preceding weeks. The Kyiv Post released a report on 5 February 2024 with a video showing the aftermath of an attack allegedly by Ukrainian special forces on a Wagner Group unit which had purportedly suffered several deaths, including one in a military vehicle shown in the footage, and the capture of at least one member of the unit who was seen being interrogated on camera along with two Africans, presumably locals recruited by Wagner.

On October 2, 2025, the SAF claimed to have killed Ukrainian mercenaries during clashes with the RSF in the Darfur region.

== Foreign arms supplies and aid to the RSF ==
=== Central African Republic ===
According to Sudanese analyst Kholood Khair, the Central African Republic (CAR) and Faustin-Archange Touadéra "are on the side of Hemedti". Coalition of Patriots for Change (CPC) rebels noted that Wagner fighters are sending weapons and reinforcements to the RSF via Um Dafuq.

In June 2024, UN reported that RSF was using CAR as part of a "supply chain" to recruit fighters from armed groups. UN especially noted the recruitment from the Popular Front for the Rebirth of Central African Republic (FPRC) rebel group. The report also noted that RSF was controlling Am Dafok, a border town in CAR, to use it as a "key logistical hub".

FPRC has itself also claimed to be involved in the fighting in Sudan. In August 2023, the leader of FPRC Noureddine Adam was injured fighting in Nyala against the SAF.

=== Chad ===
On 7 June 2023, Hissein Alamine Tchaw-tchaw, a Chadian dissident who belongs to the same ethnic group as Hemedti and claims to be the leader of the Movement for the Fight of the Oppressed in Chad (MFOC), which is fighting the government of President Mahamat Déby, posted a video showing his participation in an RSF attack on the Yarmouk munitions factory in Khartoum.

On 17 November 2023, the SLM-Minnawi and Justice and Equality Movement (JEM) groups accused the Chadian government of supporting the RSF, and "supplying it with military equipment and mercenaries by opening its territory and airspace". A report from Africa Analyst alleged that Chadian soldiers belonging to a joint Chadian-Sudanese command under Osman Bahr intercepted a shipment of military equipment intended for the RSF on its way from N'Djamena and gave it instead to the JEM, which the latter denied. The Economist linked Chad's junta receiving financial support from the UAE in exchange for allowing it to support the RSF through Amdjarass airport.

Following accusations by SAF deputy commander Yasser al-Atta of Chadian government support for the RSF, the Chadian government unsuccessfully demanded an apology from the Sudanese ambassador and expelled four Sudanese diplomats from the country on 17 December.

On 5 November 2024, the government of Sudan filed a complaint with the African Commission on Human and Peoples' Rights (ACHPR) demanding reparations from Chad for their support of the RSF, accusing Chad of violating international law.

On June 15, 2025, Bellingcat reported that Chadian-labelled weapon crates were found in a weapons depot belonging to the RSF.

On 23 February 2026, Chad shut its eastern border with Sudan indefinitely, citing repeated incursions by Sudanese armed groups and growing insecurity near its territory. The decision followed heavy fighting in the border town of al-Tina between the RSF and forces aligned with the Sudanese army, and Chad said limited humanitarian exemptions could still be granted with prior approval.

=== Desert Wolves ===
Colombian mercenaries have provided military support to the RSF. In April 2026, it was reported that Colombian contractors operated drones and advanced artillery, managed flight logistics at RSF-held airfields and formed a unit known locally as the "Desert Wolves", composed largely of former Colombian security personnel. The report also identified former Colombian army colonel José Santiago as having headed an RSF combat control centre. The Colombian presidency said that at least 40 Colombians had been killed in 2025 in airstrikes on Nyala airport and other sites in Darfur.

Later that year, Colombians were reported to have been hired by an Emirati contractor and trained at military bases in the UAE, allegations denied by the UAE. Colombians had fought alongside the RSF in Darfur, including during the capture of El Fasher. A Colombian mercenary who said he had fought in Darfur for six months in 2025 told the Associated Press that hundreds of Colombians were serving on the RSF’s front lines and helping to train recruits. Former child soldiers said Colombians had trained them to operate anti-aircraft guns, artillery and drones in Khartoum, while a former RSF fighter and a Sudanese military officer separately reported that Colombians had trained children there. The AP said that it could not independently verify the children’s accounts, although they were consistent with other reporting on the conflict.

=== Ethiopia ===
Ethiopia initially supported the RSF, which was viewed by Addis Ababa as a useful counterweight to both Egyptian influence in Sudan and the SAF, while some reports also described the RSF as having assisted Ethiopia against the Tigray People's Liberation Front during the Tigray War. Relations between Addis Ababa and Khartoum deteriorated sharply after the outbreak of the Sudanese civil war in April 2023, as the government of Abiy Ahmed was increasingly accused by Sudanese officials of indirectly supporting the RSF through cooperation with the United Arab Emirates (UAE). Hemedti visited Ethiopia in December 2023 in an attempt to push for negotiations with the SAF, further fueling speculation regarding Ethiopian ties with the paramilitary group.

In July 2024, Prime Minister Abiy Ahmed traveled to Port Sudan for talks with General al-Burhan, in what observers described as a possible shift in Ethiopia’s position on the conflict. Despite the diplomatic outreach, tensions along the Ethiopia–Sudan border continued to rise. On 4 July 2025, senior Sudanese officials accused Ethiopia of exploiting the civil war by deploying army-backed militias into the disputed Al-Fashaga District, where militias allegedly blocked Sudanese farmers and cleared agricultural land under the protection of the Ethiopian National Defense Force. Sudanese officials further alleged that Ethiopian armed groups crossed into the border district of Al Galabat to loot livestock markets amid a security vacuum created by the redeployment of Sudanese troops to the civil war frontlines.

In February 2026, Reuters reported that Ethiopia was hosting a secret camp in the Benishangul-Gumuz region to train thousands of RSF fighters near the Sudanese border, describing the facility as “the first direct evidence of Ethiopia's involvement” in the war. According to Reuters, eight sources, including a senior Ethiopian government official, alleged that the UAE financed the camp’s construction and supplied military trainers, logistics, and drone infrastructure linked to nearby Asosa airport, while an internal Ethiopian security note reportedly stated that 4,300 fighters were training at the site in January 2026. Reuters and regional analysts also alleged that the airport had become instrumental in supplying the RSF across the border into Sudan.

In May 2026, Sudan formally accused Ethiopia and the UAE of orchestrating drone attacks on Khartoum International Airport and military installations in the capital, describing the strikes as “direct aggression” against Sudanese sovereignty. General al-Burhan alleged that drones used in the attack originated from Bahir Dar airport in Ethiopia and accused the government of Abiy Ahmed of facilitating military assistance to the Rapid Support Forces, including drone support aimed at Khartoum airport. Ethiopia rejected the accusations as “baseless,” while the UAE denied involvement and dismissed the allegations as propaganda.

The accusations deepened fears that the Sudanese civil war had evolved into a wider regional proxy conflict involving Ethiopia, the UAE, Egypt, and Eritrea, with Addis Ababa allegedly viewing the RSF as a counterweight to the SAF’s alignment with Cairo and Asmara. Investigations by Reuters, the BBC, The Guardian, and regional analysts linked the UAE to extensive financial and military backing for the RSF, including alleged arms transfers, logistics networks, and support infrastructure operating through Ethiopian territory.

=== Kenya ===
The SAF rejected Kenya's mediation role in July 2023, accusing President William Ruto of having ties to RSF leader Hemedti and offering refuge to RSF members. SAF Lt. Gen. Yasir Alatta escalated tensions by calling Ruto a mercenary and challenging him to deploy troops. Sudan later threatened to quit IGAD unless Ruto was removed as head of its mediation committee. Kenya denied the accusations, calling them baseless and reaffirming its neutrality. In retaliation, Anonymous Sudan attacked Kenyan websites in late July.

Tensions amplified in February 2025 when Kenya hosted a meeting in Nairobi where the RSF and its allies signed a charter to form a parallel Sudanese government without the SAF's participation. Sudan condemned the move, accusing Kenya of undermining its sovereignty. Analysts noted a shift in Kenya's stance following Ruto's January 2025 UAE visit and economic agreement, suggesting a possible Emirati influence behind Kenya's actions.

On June 15, 2025, Bellingcat reported that Kenyan-labelled weapon crates were found in a weapons depot belonging to the RSF.

=== Libyan National Army ===
The Egypt-backed Libyan National Army, under the command of Khalifa Haftar, dispatched aircraft to fly military supplies to the RSF before the outbreak of hostilities. Haftar and the LNA collaborated with the Wagner Group, a Russian private military company, to conduct these flights. Sudan has also accused the LNA of launching joint border attacks with the RSF. Khalifa Haftar has reportedly denied these claims.

Haftar's support for a different faction in Sudan than the Egyptian government was commented on by The New Arab, which viewed it as a sign of Egyptian weakness due to economic malaise and reliance on Haftar to police Eastern Libya, which constitutes a security concern for the Egyptian government. The New Arab also viewed the LNA's role in the conflict as signifying a shift in its diplomatic orientation, from being primarily backed by Egypt to being primarily backed by the United Arab Emirates (UAE).

=== Puntland ===
Puntland, a semi-autonomous state inside of Somalia has been accused by the Sudanese Foreign Ministry of siding with the RSF. According to the ministry, Puntland allowed UAE to use the Bosaso Airport to move weapons and troops to Sudan. Puntland firmly denied these accusations calling them "baseless" and "damaging to its reputation".

=== South Sudan ===
Since the outbreak of renewed violence in Sudan in 2023, South Sudan has adopted a mediatory role, urging peace and engaging with IGAD and the AU, though with limited success due to the conflict's complexity and multiple factions. South Sudan is deeply concerned about spillover effects—such as refugee flows and economic instability—and recognizes that its own fragile stability is tied to Sudan's fate. Tensions escalated further with a February 2025 alliance between Sudan's RSF and the SPLM–N, a rebel group near the South Sudanese border. Experts warn this could pull South Sudan into the conflict, especially if the Sudanese Army supports rival South Sudanese militias in response. With shared borders, historical ties, and existing political tensions between South Sudan's leaders (President Salva Kiir and Vice President Riek Machar), the risk of both wars merging is high. The strategic location of the RSF-SPLM–N alliance also boosts smuggling and military operations, weakening the Sudanese Army and increasing regional instability. If left unchecked, experts fear the two conflicts could become indistinguishable, worsening humanitarian crises in both countries.

On 10 December 2025 South Sudan People's Defence Forces (SSPDF) entered the Sudanese town of Heglig under a "tripartite agreement" involving Salva Kiir, al-Burhan and Hemedti.

According Amnesty International, RSF weapon, vehicle and fuel supply lines have been identified crossing through South Sudan with the approval of local government officials.

=== United Arab Emirates ===
The UAE has faced mounting accusations of providing military support to RSF, including covert arms transfers, drone supply, and logistics routed through Chad, Libya, CAR, and South Sudan. Reports by major outlets like the Wall Street Journal (WSJ), New York Times (NYT), The Guardian, and BBC, along with diplomatic sources and satellite evidence, suggest Emirati cargo planes delivered weapons disguised as aid, with operations coordinated through Amdjarass airport in Chad. UAE denied the accusations. The UAE had been previously known for their support to the Sudanese military, and marginalised civilian rule by promoting the idea of Hemedti to helm the country's economic policy "in the interests of a stable transition".

Sudan expelled Emirati diplomats, accused the UAE at the UN of aiding genocide, and submitted complaints to the International Criminal Court (ICC) and the International Court of Justice (ICJ). The residence of the UAE ambassador to Sudan in Khartoum was also attacked on 29 September 2024. The UAE was accused of using humanitarian cover such as Red Crescent hospitals for military purposes, including drone operations and weapon bunkers near the border. Sudan claimed these actions aimed to maintain Emirati influence and gold interests in Sudan, backed by historical investments and ongoing port and agriculture projects.

The UAE's ties to the RSF date back to the Yemeni civil war in 2018. Its involvement is said to include cooperation with the Wagner Group for arms deliveries and financing RSF logistics from within the Emirates. Identity documents recovered from a 2024 plane crash in Sudan included a Russian passport and an ID that linked to a UAE-based company.

The US and the UK have called on the UAE to halt support, with US lawmakers introducing multiple bills to block arms sales to Abu Dhabi. The EU and Human Rights Watch also demanded accountability. Emirati diplomatic initiatives toward Sudan continued, such as hosting a humanitarian conference and pledging $200 million aid—actions seen by Sudan as attempts by UAE to improve its image.

On 30 April 2025 UAE authorities said they had intercepted millions of rounds of ammunition at an airport in the UAE which was being illegally transferred to the SAF, which the latter denied.

Sudan opened a case at the International Court of Justice (ICJ) accusing the UAE of breaching the Genocide Convention by arming and funding the Rapid Support Forces. The court hearings began on 10 April 2025. On 5 May, the court dismissed the case, stating it "manifestly lacks" the authority to continue the proceedings, as the UAE holds a carveout to the provision of the Genocide Convention that grants the court jurisdiction over such cases.

Since the beginning of the Sudanese war, the UAE has been using the Bosaso International Airport Co (BIAC) as a key logistical hub to supply the RSF with arms and mercenaries. Due to its strategic location and the UAE's close ties with Puntland's leadership, Bosaso Airport serves as a crucial transit point for Emirati weapons and Colombian paramilitaries affiliated with Abu Dhabi's Global Security Service Group (GSSG) to Sudan. In September 2025, Sudan urged Somalia to cease the operations taking place in Bosaso.

Sudan's Foreign Ministry accused the UAE of making "desperate efforts" at the Non-Aligned Movement meetings to protect the RSF from condemnation and undercut international solidarity with Sudan. The Ministry said Abu Dhabi should not be allowed to exploit global forums, citing its suggestion of an alternative government.

In August 2025, the Sudanese government released a statement accusing regional and international communities of targeting Sudan and supporting the RSF's aggression. It further claimed that the presence of numerous foreign mercenaries posed a significant threat to the nation's peace and security. The government asserted that it possessed undeniable evidence showing that UAE authorities had sponsored and financed mercenaries from Colombia and other neighboring countries.

In October 2025, the SAF recovered boxes of arms, ammunitions and medicines supplied by the UAE from an area previously held by the RSF in southeast Sudan.

The UAE is the primary purchaser of Sudanese gold from RSF-controlled areas. Through UAE's economic networks gold is channeled from Darfur and other conflict zones into global markets, generating liquidity and linking the RSF to transnational brokerage networks. Flexible, informal channels help move supplies, personnel and capital, sustaining the RSF's military capacity and its political relevance. The RSF primarily funds its operations through gold exports to supporting countries, including the UAE, Kenya and Ethiopia. In 2025, after declaring their support for the RSF, all three countries published quarterly gold production figures that were double those of the previous year.

=== Uganda ===
In February 2026, Sudan condemned Uganda after President Yoweri Museveni hosted RSF commander Hemedti in Entebbe. Sudan's foreign ministry said the visit violated international law and described it as a grave insult, while Museveni, who has been tasked by the African Union with mediation efforts, said he had stressed the need for dialogue and a peaceful political settlement.

In November 2023, Chief of the General Staff of SAF, Yasser al-Atta accused Uganda of allowing UAE arms to travel through Uganda to arm the RSF. The Ugandan Minister of State for Foreign Affairs described al-Atta's claims as "absolute nonsense." Middle Eastern Eye tracked UAE flights from Uganda to North Kordofan to supply arms directly to the RSF.

=== Wagner Group ===
According to CNN, Wagner supplied surface-to-air missiles to the RSF, picking up the items from Syria and delivering some of them by plane to Haftar-controlled bases in Libya to be then delivered to the RSF, while dropping other items directly to RSF positions in northwestern Sudan. American officials said that Wagner was offering to supply additional weapons to the RSF from its existing stocks in the Central African Republic (CAR). On 6 September, Wagner reportedly deployed a convoy of more than 100 vehicles carrying weapons to the RSF garrison in al-Zurug from Chad. SAF Lieutenant General Yasser al-Atta also accused the Wagner Group of bringing in mercenaries from several African nations to fight alongside the RSF. The head of the Wagner Group, Yevgeny Prigozhin, and the RSF denied the allegations.

As relations between the Russian government and the SAF improved during mid-2024, the latter publicly claimed that the Wagner Group was no longer operating in Sudan. This claim was contradicted by a diplomatic source and eyewitnesses speaking to Middle East Eye (MEE).

== Foreign arms supplies to both sides ==
=== China ===
China's approach to the conflict is shaped primarily by its economic interests, including investments in oil, mining, and infrastructure linked to the Belt and Road Initiative. While instability threatens these assets, Beijing has sought to balance its economic engagement with a policy of non-interference, avoiding explicit alignment with either side. By maintaining operations and prioritising the protection of long-term investments, China has continued to play an indirect role in the conflict without overt escalation.

Amnesty International's 2024 report highlighted China as a supplier of weapons fueling the conflict, breaching the Darfur arms embargo. Recently manufactured Chinese arms have been traced to both the SAF and the RSF, although China's official stance avoids acknowledging direct support to either faction. China initially adhered to non-interference, evacuating citizens and calling for peace without taking sides. This mirrored its approach in past conflicts, prioritizing stability to protect economic interests. China's Sudan strategy ties into the Belt and Road Initiative, aiming to secure Red Sea trade routes and infrastructure links, ambitions delayed by the civil war. On 9 January 2025 China donated emergency food aid (1,250 tonnes) to be allocated to all states.

=== Serbia ===
In a report by Amnesty International, Serbia has been accused of selling arms to both sides of the conflict. Drones, weapons and ammunition produced by the weapons manufacturing companies Zastava Arms and Yugoimport–SDPR in Serbia have reportedly been used by soldiers of the RSF and allied Janjaweed militias, alongside those produced in other countries such as the UAE, China and Yemen.

== Foreign arms supplies through third parties ==
=== Canada ===
A federal department referred a contract from Canadian lobbying firm Dickens & Madsen Inc. to the RCMP for investigation after Amnesty International asked the government of Canada to investigate this over possible violations on sanctions in Sudan. The contract was signed between Hemedti and Ari Ben-Menashe (head of the company) in May 2019 for US$6 million, a month before the Khartoum massacre. The aim was to present the military regime in positive light, securing meetings with potential oil investors and officials from US, Libya, Saudi Arabia and Russia to strengthen international ties, funding and equipment.

In November 2025, Mark Carney visited to Abu Dhabi to meet with the UAE president. Carney said he discussed the Sudan civil war during this meeting, though the details are unclear. In addition, Canada exports weapons to the UAE; however, the UAE insists these weapons do not flow into the hands of the RSF.

Despite this, Canadian weapons have been seen used by RSF soldiers. In 2016, a United Nations panel accused Canadian company STREIT Group of breaking the arms embargo against Sudan. The allegation involved a 2012 sales of 24 armoured vehicles. This is the third time the UN has condemned the company's actions, which violated the terms of the UN Arms Trade Treaty, signed by Canada in 2019 to prohibit the export of arms to Sudan directly or through third countries. STREIT Group claimed that the exports do not violate controls because they do not have weapons attached to them.

There has also been documentation of STREIT Group's armored vehicles over the years. RSF soldiers were also seen posting on social media over the years in armored vehicles manufactured by the group, along with rifles manufactured by another Canadian company, Sterling Cross Defense Systems.

=== Israel ===
In August and October 2023, LAR-160 light rocket artillery mounts and Galil ACE 31 carbines produced in Israel were found to have been used by members of the RSF during fighting with government forces, raising questions over the supply of heavy weaponry to the group by foreign powers. Though it was later reported that these weapons were likely purchased and transferred to Sudan by a third party, or possibly through international arms trafficking.

=== Greece ===
In 2022, a flight was made from Cyprus to Khartoum with a stopover in Athens, containing undeclared cargo that was determined by various sources as surveillance technologies, including Predator spyware developed by Cytrox, a company owned by Israeli-tycoon Tal Dilian. Concerns were raised at the time that these surveillance technologies could be used by the RSF to repress protesters. The Greek government initially denied exporting Predator to the RSF in Sudan, but in 2023, Greek Deputy Foreign Minister Miltiadis Varvitsiotis admitted to granting license to export Predator for the flight, but denied that this was involved in Sudan's civil war.

=== United Kingdom ===
The UK is the UN Security Council's penholder for Sudan. In early 2023, the Foreign, Commonwealth and Development Office (FCDO) initiated secret talks with the RSF. In June 2024, The Guardian reported that according to multiple sources, FCDO officials "attempted to suppress criticism" of the United Arab Emirates and its alleged role in supplying arms to the RSF. In December 2024, Sudan's Deputy Chairman of the Sovereign Council, Malik Agar, criticized the British government's position on the conflict, stating that the UK "must communicate with the UAE to stop the logistical support it provides to the militia". He also claimed that the Sudanese government was "ready to open a new page with the UK under the new government if it changes the way it manages its foreign files related to Sudan". In October 2025, the Sudanese government supplied the UN Security Council with documentation of military equipment made in the UK being used by the RSF. The equipment was allegedly sold by UK firms to the UAE, which then sent them to the RSF. The alleged equipment includes small-arms target devices manufactured by Militec. The other were engines manufactured by Cummins UK that are used by Emirati-manufactured Nimr APC vehicles by the Edge Group. In the former case, the company responded by saying that it was only for training purposes, while in the latter case, they denied any involvement in embargoed countries.

== Mediatory role ==
=== United States ===
On 20 January 2025, the Trump administration froze USAID payments for 90 days, redirecting most funds to military aid. This resulted in the closure of hundreds of soup kitchens, and increased deaths from starvation. A court ordered the freeze lifted on 13 February, but the administration cancelled nearly 10,000 aid contracts instead. The judge later demanded payments by 26 February, but Chief Justice John G. Roberts paused the order pending a Supreme Court ruling by 28 February.

The US announced a diplomatic meeting of the International Quartet on Sudan, aiming to develop a unified vision to end the war, stop foreign involvement and secure a ceasefire. Scheduled for 29 July 2025 in Washington D.C., the meeting was to include the United States, Saudi Arabia, the UAE and Egypt. However, it was postponed at the last minute. Meanwhile, a coalition of Sudanese political parties rejected the UAE as a mediator, calling it "morally unqualified" due to its backing of the RSF.
