= 2022 Greek surveillance scandal =

Political scandal

The 2022 Greek surveillance scandal, sometimes called Predatorgate or Greek Watergate, refers to the prolonged and en masse monitoring of individuals prominent in the Greek political scene, along with multiple public persons, including Nikos Androulakis (the president of the social democratic party PASOK), the journalists Thanassis Koukakis and Stavros Michaloudis, as well as members of the government and close affiliates of Kyriakos Mitsotakis, among others, via the Greek National Intelligence Service (EYP) or the Predator spyware.

Following the 2019 Greek legislative election, the new Greek Prime Minister Kyriakos Mitsotakis placed the National Intelligence Service (EYP) under his personal control and the responsibility of his nephew and General Secretary of the Prime Minister Grigoris Dimitriadis, and appointed Panagiotis Kontoleon as EYP chief, after changing the law about the office's required qualifications. 92 smartphones, belonging to businessmen, journalists, prosecutors, state officers, politicians, government ministers and their associates, were targeted with Predator via 220 SMS messages, sent via bulk messaging services. Seven SMS messages contained precise data about the target's vaccination appointment against COVID-19, obtained by EYP surveillance. The first trial SMS messages were sent in 2020, while the 11 first confirmed real SMS messages appeared as sent from the phone number of Dimitriadis in January 2021, in response to wishes he had received for his name day the previous day.

In January 2023, ADAE, the Greek independent authority safeguarding the privacy of telecommunications, confirmed that Minister of Labour Kostis Hatzidakis and the Chief of the Hellenic National Defence General Staff General Konstantinos Floros had been under surveillance from EYP, contrary to Mitsotakis's denial the previous month.

== Precursors to the main events ==
On 8 July 2019, just after the 2019 Greek legislative election, the newly elected prime minister Kyriakos Mitsotakis placed the National Intelligence Service (EYP) under his direct control, later solidifying this decision via verification and implementation of the Executive State Law 4622/2019. In August the government passed a legislative amendment to remove holding a university degree from required qualifications for the head of the EYP and to enable them appoint Panagiotis Kontoleon as its chief, despite Mitsotakis having denied any laws would be changed. EYP was placed under the political responsibility of Mitsotakis's nephew and General Secretary, Grigoris Dimitriadis. On 9 August 2019, Panagiotis Politis, a professor and syndicalist in University of Thessaly, stated that he had found a GPS tracker in his car. In November 2019, GPS trackers were found on cars and motorcycles belonging to members of the anarcho-communist collective Taksiki Antepithesi (Social Class Counterattack) and a camera facing the collective's headquarters was found placed on a stationed car, which was later taken away with riot police escort. These events however were not addressed by most of mainstream media at the time.

In July 2023 a research group of the Hellenic Data Protection Authority announced it had found 220 SMSs containing a hyperlink contaminating the recipient's smartphone with Predator, which had been sent to 92 smartphones turning them into surveillance devices. Investigative journalism website Inside Story published many of them, sent mostly in 2021 to politicians, government ministers and their associates, among whom PM associates. They included politicians Dimitris Avramopoulos, Giorgos Patoulis, Giorgos Gerapetritis, Kostis Hatzidakis, Thanos Plevris, Michalis Chrysochoidis, Adonis Georgiadis, Nikos Dendias, Christos Spirtzis businessmen, journalists, EYP cadres, at least one Metropolitan bishop and the editor of the daily Kathimerini, Alexis Papachelas. The names of the recipients were included in lists of persons targeted by EYP and Predator published by newspaper Documento in November 2022. Seven of the SMS messages, including the one received by META employee Artemis Seaford contained data about the vaccination appointment against COVID-19, obtained via EYP surveillance which allows access to SMS messages received in a mobile phone. The SMS messages were sent using three bulk SMS sending service companies based in Greece, some via offshore companies and were paid via prepaid cards. The first trial SMS messages were sent in 2020. In January 2021, one day after the name day of Dimitriadis, 11 SMS messages were sent to politicians, government and state officials and businessmen. They appeared as SMS messages sent from Dimitriadis's phone number in response to wish messages he had received for his name day, containing hyperlinks that contaminated the recipient's smartphone with Predator. The recipients included former EU Commissioner Dimitris Avramopoulos, Regional Governor of Attica Giorgos Patoulis, Hellenic Police chief Michalis Karamalakis and the prosecutor responsible for EYP Vassiliki Vlachou. A few days later Intellexa over-quadrupled the capacity of its servers in Greece.

In March 2021, the New Democracy Mitsotakis government, supported by the PASOK party, changed the law (826/145 of the law 2472/1997) regarding wiretappings by the NIS, retroactively removing citizens' right to be informed of their surveillance after it had been concluded. Ιn 2021 alone, 15,000 surveillance orders were issued.

== Main developments ==
The case reached media spotlight when opposition politician Nikos Androulakis revealed in July 2022 that there was an attempted hack of his mobile phone. At that point two journalists, Thanassis Koukakis and Stavros Michaloudis, had already made similar accusations. The mobile phones of all three individuals were hacked with the illegal software called Predator, although it was only successfully installed on the journalists' phones. The revelations were followed by the resignations of the head of the NIS, Panagiotis Kontoleon, and the General Secretary of the Prime Minister and his nephew, Grigoris Dimitriadis.

Financial journalist Thanasis Koukakis who had previously investigated the Greek banking sector, heard from a government source that he was being surveilled by the Greek secret service. It was later discovered the violation of the privacy of his communications through the Predator software that had infected his mobile phone, on 28 March 2022, after an audit carried out on his behalf by the Citizen Lab of the University of Toronto. On 26 July 2022, Androulakis filed a complaint to the Supreme Court for personal data breach, as the presence of a link related to the illegal Predator software was detected on his mobile phone.

In July 2022, the Special Permanent Committee on Institutions and Transparency of the Parliament was convened where the Head of the NIS, Panagiotis Kontoleon and the president of Communications Privacy Authority (AADE), Christos Rammos, attended. Leaks from the meeting were circulated in the media according to which Kontoleon admitted that NIS was monitoring Koukakis and that this happened at the request of foreign services. A few days later, EFSYN published an investigation linking the then General Secretary of the Prime Minister, Grigoris Dimitriadis, to the company that supplies the predator software in Greece. On 5 August 2022, Dimitriadis resigned from the position of General Secretary to the Prime Minister. Less than an hour later, Panagiotis Kontoleon, the leader of the NIS also resigned.

On Monday, 8 August, Prime Minister Kyriakos Mitsotakis made a brief statement on the issue of wiretappings, issuing that he did not know about the wiretapping of Androulakis and that if he had known, he would not have allowed it to happen. The opposition claimed that it was impossible that Mitsotakis did not know as NIS is under his supervision.

A commission of inquiry was later upvoted after the proposal was submitted by PASOK. The proceedings lasted less than a month with the inquiry ending in a stalemate, with the government considering the issue closed and no evidence published about the use of Predator. However, in November more names were revealed to be involved in the list of targeted individuals. On 8 December, Mitsotakis ardently refuted in parliament the allegations that he could have ordered a surveillance of the Minister of Labour Kostis Hatzidakis, or of the Chief of the Hellenic Armed Forces, Konstantinos Floros. When asked if it is possible that departments under his personal control could have ordered it, with him claiming ignorance, he left parliament without answering. On 16 December, it was revealed that ADAE, a Greek independent authority safeguarding the privacy of telecommunications, had confirmed the surveillance of MEP Giorgos Kyrtsos and investigative journalist Tasos Telloglou after carrying out an audit.

On 24 January 2023, responding to a question by Alexis Tsipras regarding six specific individuals, including Kostis Hatzidakis and Konstantinos Floros, ADAE officially confirmed that all of them had been under surveillance by the National Intelligence Service, a department under Mitsotakis' direct control.

=== Hacking of Artemis Seaford ===
According to The New York Times, Greece's national intelligence agency allegedly wiretapped and hacked the phone of Artemis Seaford, a former security policy manager at Meta. Seaford worked for Meta from 2020 to 2022 and was surveilled using the Predator spyware while living partly in Greece. Seaford was made aware of the possible hack when her name appeared on the leaked list of spyware targets in November 2022. Cybersecurity researchers at Citizen Lab confirmed that Predator infected her phone for at least two months starting in September 2021. Seaford was also reportedly wiretapped for a year.

This constituted further indication that the NIS was using the spyware, as it is yet another case of "double" spying using both hacking and the legal wiretapping tools in conjunction. Moreover, the SMS containing the link that was used to infect the victim's phone used accurate data about the victim's vaccination appointments.

Seaford stated that she does not know why the government would target her, as the hacking remains unexplained and NIS has refused to provide evidence.

=== Distribution of Predator ===
In November 2022, the Greek Foreign Ministry provided documents about its role in exporting Predator to foreign countries, despite earlier claims that the government had no relations with the company selling the spyware.

After the outbreak of clashes in Sudan and relevant accusations by the opposition, Greek Alternate Foreign Minister Miltiadis Varvitsiotis admitted that the government gave an export license for supplying the Sudanese government with the Predator spyware.

== International attention ==
The international press has dealt extensively with the issue. The Guardian compared the government to the Greek junta, and The New York Times referred to it as the "rot at the heart of Greece". The government representative, Giannis Oikonomou, verbally attacked the journalist of Politico, Nektaria Stamoulis for her handling of the issue, which caused the agency's reaction saying that "Nektaria was brutally abused by the Greek government". The European Commission sent a letter to the Greek Government asking about the surveillance.

The targeting of journalists during the course of the wiretapping scandal led Greece to fall from the 70th to the 108th place on the 2022 Reporters Without Borders press freedom ranking, the lowest position of any European country, with it remaining so as of 2023.

== PEGA Committee ==
On 3 November 2022, the commission came to Greece to investigate the use of illegal software by the Greek government.

On 8 May 2023, its final report was approved and adopted by the European Parliament. It concluded that there were violations of EU law, and issued ten recommendations to Greece, calling it to urgently act to reverse essentially all laws passed by the New Democracy government regarding the NIS, to take actions and provide safeguards in order for the rule of law to be protected in the country and the scandal to be independently investigated, including implementing the, as of yet still unenforced in Greece, Whistleblowers Directive as well as inviting Europol to the country to participate in the investigations, and to revoke all possible illegal export licences of spyware, including the one to Sudan.

== Judicial investigation ==
Two prosecutors began investigating the case in late 2022. In October 2023 they asked the independent authority responsible for privacy (ADAE) to cross-check whether the 92 people targeted with Predator had also been surveilled by the country’s intelligence service (EYP). Following their second request to ADAE on 20 October they were removed from the case three days later, by an order of Supreme Court Prosecutor Georgia Adeilini, who cited delays in their investigation.

In February 2026, a Greek court sentenced four individuals, including two Israeli nationals, to eight years in prison in connection with the Predator spyware scandal. The case concerned the illegal use of Predator spyware to monitor the mobile phones of politicians, journalists, business figures and senior military officials in Greece.

== Namelist ==
On 5 November, Documento newspaper published a list of names that were under surveillance. Among others, according to the claims of the newspaper, under survelliance was the former Prime Minister, Antonis Samaras, the Minister of Foreign Affairs, Nikos Dendias, the former Ministers of Citizen Protection, Olga Gerovasili and Michalis Chrisochoidis, the Regional Governor of Attica, Giorgos Patoulis, the editors Alexis Papahelas, Antonis Dellatolas and Yiannis Kourtakis, the former president of National Public Health Organization, Panagiotis Arkoumaneas, former Minister of Karamanlis' Cabinet and former Mayor of Athens, Dimitris Avramopoulos, former Minister of Samaras' Cabinet, Olga Kefalogianni, the Minister of Labour, Kostis Hatzidakis, the deputy and former Government Spokesperson, Aristotelia Peloni, former Minister of Health and current Minister of Tourism, Vasilis Kikilias, Minister for Development and Investment and Vice President of the current governing party, Adonis Georgiadis and the President of Aris FC, Theodoros Karypidis. It has been stated that the monitoring of Theodoros Karypidis was intended to side-monitor president of Olympiacos and Nottingham Forest F.C., Evangelos Marinakis.
