= Cytrox =

Spyware company

- Founded: 2017
- Key people: Ivo Malinkovski (CEO)
- Owner: Tal Dilian
- Subsidiaries: Cytrox Holdings Zrt (Hungary); Cytrox AD (North Macedonia); Balinese Ltd. (Israel); Peterbald Ltd. (Israel)

Cytrox is a company established in 2017 that makes malware used for cyberattacks and covert surveillance. Its Predator spyware was used to target Egyptian politician Ayman Nour in 2021 and to spy on 92 phones belonging to businessmen, journalists, politicians, government ministers and their associates in Greece. In 2023, the U.S. Department of Commerce added the Cytrox companies Cytrox AD in North Macedonia, and Cytrox Holdings Zrt in Hungary to its Entity List and on 5 March 2024, the U.S. Department of Treasury imposed sanctions upon Cytrox AD of North Macedonia and the Intellexa Consortium, which is the parent firm of Cytrox AD, "for trafficking in cyber exploits used to gain access to information systems, threatening the privacy and security of individuals and organizations worldwide."

== History ==
Cytrox was established in 2017, reportedly as a startup in North Macedonia and received initial funding from Israel Aerospace Industries. Its Crunchbase article describes it as providing an "operational cyber solution" to governments, including gathering information from devices and cloud services. Cytrox's CEO is Ivo Malinkovski. A review of corporate registry documents by the University of Toronto's Citizen Lab indicated that Cytrox has a presence in Israel and Hungary.

In 2019, Forbes reported that Cytrox was rescued by Tal Dilian, a former commander of the Israel Defense Forces (IDF), who acquired the company for under $5 million. Dilian served in the IDF for 25 years prior to his departure, following accusations that he had unlawfully enriched himself. Dilian demonstrated the company's surveillance kit to Forbes by hacking into a Huawei device and obtaining its WhatsApp messages without clicks from the victim.

The Citizen Lab said in 2021 that Cytrox was part of an alliance known as Intellexa, which it called "a marketing label for a range of mercenary surveillance vendors that emerged in 2019." Dilian founded the Intellexa Group in 2018; the Intellexa Alliance combines the Intellexa Group and Nexa, a group of surveillance companies that operates mainly in France.

In December 2021, Meta Platforms announced that Cytrox and six other surveillance-for-hire groups had been banned from using its platforms to target other users, in response to the Citizen Lab's findings about Cytrox's Predator spyware being used to target two Egyptian dissidents in June. Meta also announced it had removed over 1,500 Facebook and Instagram accounts associated with the seven companies, which it said were used to conduct social engineering, reconnaissance and sending malicious links to victims in over 100 countries.

In July 2023, the U.S. Department of Commerce added the Cytrox companies Cytrox AD in North Macedonia, and Cytrox Holdings Zrt in Hungary to its Entity List, after determining that they posed a threat to the U.S.'s national security and foreign policy interests.

== Predator ==
Predator is spyware developed by Cytrox that targets the Android and iOS operating systems. In May 2022, researchers at Google's Threat Analysis Group (TAG) reported that Predator bundled five zero-day exploits in one package and sold it to several government-backed actors, who used it in three separate campaigns. According to the researchers, Predator worked closely with a component named Alien, which "lives inside multiple privileged processes and receives commands from Predator."

An analysis of the spyware conducted by Cisco Talos in May 2023 revealed that the spyware's Alien component actively implements the low-level functionality required by Predator to surveil its targets, instead of merely acting as a loader for Predator as was previously understood. In Talos's sample, Alien exploited five vulnerabilities, four of which affected Google Chrome and the last of which affected Linux and Android, to infect the targeted devices. After infecting a device, Predator has full access to its microphone, camera and user data such as contacts and text messages. Additionally, Predator has access to a device's location services and messaging apps such as WhatsApp, Telegram and Signal. It also allows hackers to intercept and falsify messages.

An October 2023 investigation conducted by news organisations led by the European Investigative Collaborations network, known as the Predator Files, found that Predator has been sold to at least 25 countries, including Austria, Germany, Switzerland, the Democratic Republic of the Congo, Jordan, Kenya, Oman, Pakistan, Qatar, Singapore, the United Arab Emirates and Vietnam. Reportedly it was also sold to the Rapid Support Forces in the Sudan.

In March 2024, a number of individuals and legal entities associated with the Intellexa Consortium were named by the U.S. Department of the Treasury’s Office of Foreign Assets Control (OFAC) for their involvement in the development, operation and distribution of commercial spyware. According to OFAC, the Intellexa Consortium was acting as a marketing label for numerous malicious cyber companies, enabling targeted and mass surveillance through the provision of commercial spyware and surveillance tools packaged in the Predator spyware suite.

In September 2024, the U.S. Treasury announced five further sanctions targets, including senior executives and associates at Intellexa. The targets of the sanctions are alleged to have been involved in the sale of "Predator" to authoritarian governments:

- Felix Bitzios, the owner of an Intellexa consortium company alleged to have sold Predator to an unnamed foreign government;
- Merom Harpaz and Panagiota Karaoli, named by the Treasury as senior Intellexa executives;
- Andrea Nicola Constantino Hermes Gambazzi, who according to the Treasury processed transactions for companies within the Intellexa consortium;
- Aliada Group, a company based in the British Virgin Islands and a member of the Intellexa group, alleged to have enabled tens of millions of dollars in transactions for the consortium.

In December 2025, an Amnesty International Security Lab investigation (alongside Haaretz and the Swiss WAV Research Collective) into leaked documents and training videos from within Intellexa revealed that the Predator system makes use of web advertising infrastructure to distribute its implant(s). The groups also discovered that Intellexa employees likely maintain extensive access to customer systems. Google's TAG released an investigation at the same time, confirming the Predator system's reliance on malvertising to distribute itself to targets.

=== High-profile targets ===
==== Angola ====
In 2024, an Amnesty International, Citizen Lab and Recorded Future investigation concluded that Teixeira Cândido, a prominent Angolan journalist was found to have been targeted with Predator on his mobile device. The attack was successful due to a one-click link attack sent to his phone. This was after authoritarian laws and persecution of journalists were enforced during President João Lourenço's second term in 2022.

==== Egypt ====
In December 2021, the Citizen Lab reported that Predator was used to hack the devices of two individuals, Egyptian opposition politician Ayman Nour and an unnamed exiled journalist, in June. As a result, Apple was forced to release a Software Update for iOS to close the zero-day exploits used to perform the attack.

In September 2023, researchers at the Citizen Lab and the TAG reported that Egyptian opposition politician Ahmed Tantawi was targeted using Predator after announcing his presidential bid. The Citizen Lab said the effort likely failed due to Tantawi having his phone in "lockdown mode", which is recommended by Apple for iPhone users at high risk. It also said it had "high confidence" that the attack was conducted by the Egyptian government. Apple subsequently issued security updates to patch the vulnerabilities exploited by Predator.

==== Greece ====
During the 2022 Greek wiretapping scandal, it was revealed that Predator was being used to surveil several politicians (including opposition politician Nikos Androulakis) and journalists, with the Greek government reportedly being implicated in buying and utilising Predator. The Greek government admitted to spying on journalist Thanasis Koukakis, but denied using Predator or maintaining any association with Intellexa. In October 2022, Koukakis sued Intellexa and its executive for breach of privacy. On 26 February 2026 a Greek court convicted Intellexa founder Tal Dilian and three other executives linked to the company of breaching the confidentiality of telephone communications and illegally accessing information systems. Each was sentenced to eight years in prison, suspended pending appeal.

In March 2023, The New York Times reported that Artemis Seaford, a dual U.S.-Greek national and former security policy manager at Meta, had her phone infected with Predator while in Greece.

In July 2023, the investigation team of the Hellenic Data Protection Authority announced that it had found 220 text messages containing a link polluted with Predator, that had been sent to 92 telephone numbers in order to turn them into spying devices. The news website Inside Story published the content of many of them, which had been sent mostly in 2021. Their recipients included many politicians, ministers and their associates, including associates of the Prime Minister (e.g., Dimitris Avramopoulos, Giorgos Patoulis, Giorgos Gerapetritis, Kostis Hatzidakis, Thanos Plevris, Michalis Chrysochoidis, Adonis Georgiadis, Nikos Dendias, Christos Spirtzis), businessmen (e.g., Theodoros Karipidis), journalists, EYP cadres, at least one bishop and the editor of the newspaper Kathimerini, Alexis Papachelas. These names had been included in a list of persons alleged to have been spied upon by EYP and Predator, which had been published in November 2022 by the Documento newspaper.

==== Sudan ====
In November 2022, it was revealed that a Cessna aircraft containing undeclared exports from Cyprus stopped in Athens before delivering to Khartoum. Predator was identified as one of the three surveillance systems in it. Concerns over the possible use of this software were raised due to a history of Sudanese authorities using censorship and surveillance systems such as Remote Control Systems and BlueCoat Proxy SG against protesters, activists and journalists.

==== United States ====
In October 2023, various American lawmakers were targeted by Vietnam using Predator, including Representative Michael McCaul (R-TX) and Senators John Hoeven (R-ND), Chris Murphy (D-CT) and Gary Peters (D-MI). Experts on Asia at various think tanks and several journalists, including CNN's lead national security reporter Jim Sciutto, were also targeted.

== Sanctions ==
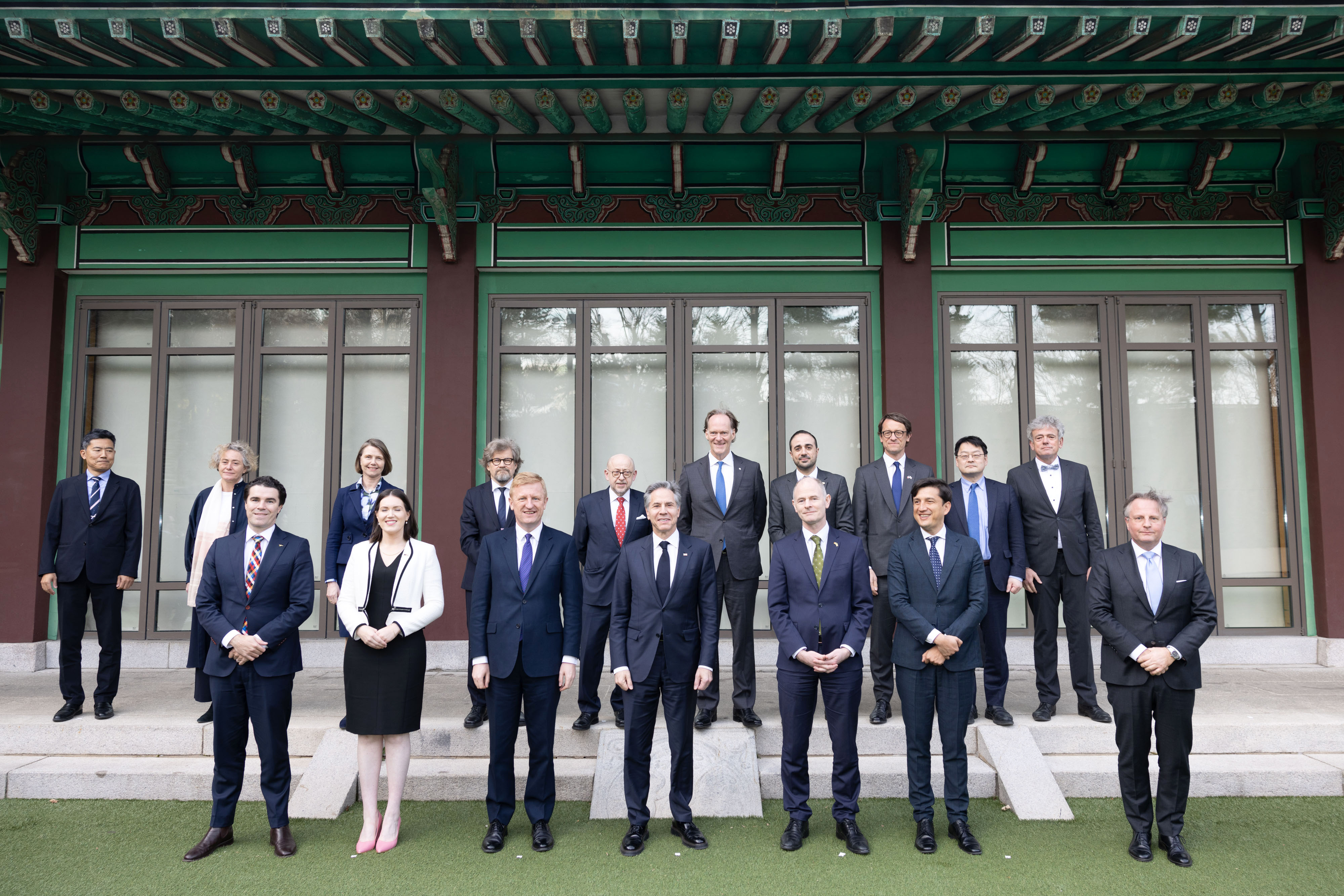
United States Secretary of State Antony Blinken in a family photo with Commercial Spyware Joint Statement Signatories in Seoul, Republic of Korea on 18 March 2024

On 5 March 2024, the United States Department of Treasury's Office of Foreign Assets Control (OFAC) imposed sanctions against five entities and two individuals it described as key enablers of the Intellexa Consortium and Predator spyware by placing them on OFAC's Specially Designated Nationals (SDN) List:

- the Intellexa Consortium;
- its founder Tal Jonathan Dilian, (Note: Tal Dilian served in the Israel Defense Forces (IDF) as an intelligence officer attaining the rank of general. He had an estimated wealth of more the $12 billion in August 2019. He uses Cyprus as his base for his surveillance activities.) who the Treasury described as the architect behind its spyware tools;
- the Intellexa Consortium's corporate off shoot specialist Sara Aleksandra Fayssal Hamou; (Note: Sara Aleksandra Fayssal Hamou was born in Warsaw to a Polish mother and Lebanese father, attended law school in England, joined Trident Trust in December 2008, is closely associated with DJC Accountants of Cyprus and allegedly established numerous entities in support of Tal Dilian's interests using Cyprus as a hub. Trident Trust allegedly supports members of the inner circle of Vladimir Putin. Sara Hamou is the ex-wife of Tal Dilian and his business partner and is an attorney based in Cyprus that allegedly has implemented numerous surveillance projects in Asia, Africa, the Middle East and Europe.)
- the Greece-based firm Intellexa S.A.;
- the Hungary-based Cytrox Holdings Zartkoruen Mukodo Reszvenytarsasag (Cytrox Holdings ZRT), which the Treasury described as having originally developed Predator before the consortium moved its software production to Cytrox AD of North Macedonia;
- the Ireland-based Intellexa Limited;
- the Ireland-based Thalestris Limited;
- and the North Macedonia-based Cytrox AD.

In late 2025 the Treasury lifted the sanctions it had imposed in 2024 on three people linked to the Intellexa Consortium. A U.S. official told CyberScoop that the removals followed a request for reconsideration. The official said each person had taken steps to distance themselves from the consortium.

== See also ==
- Pegasus
- NSO Group
