= Dilian =

Dilian is a given name and surname. Notable people with the name include:

- Dilian Francisca Toro (born 1959), Colombian physician and politician
- Irasema Dilián (1924–1996), actress
- Tal Dilian (fl. 1980), Israeli colonel
