= Executive State (Greece) =

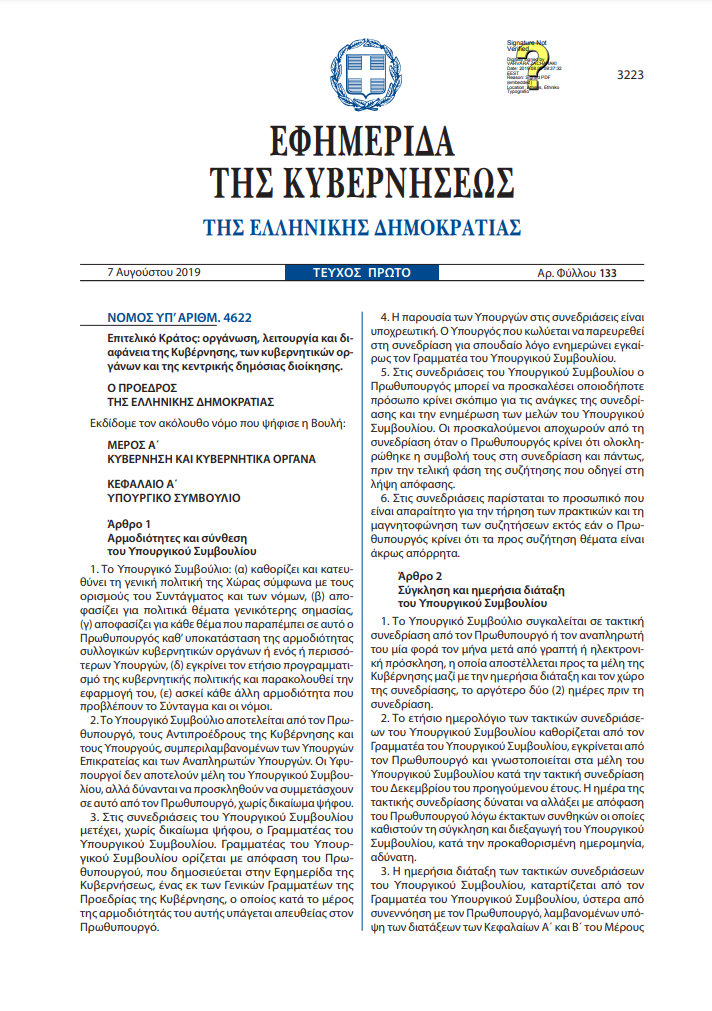
The first page of the Greek Government Gazette A 133/07.08.2019 with the Law 4622/2019 for the Executive State

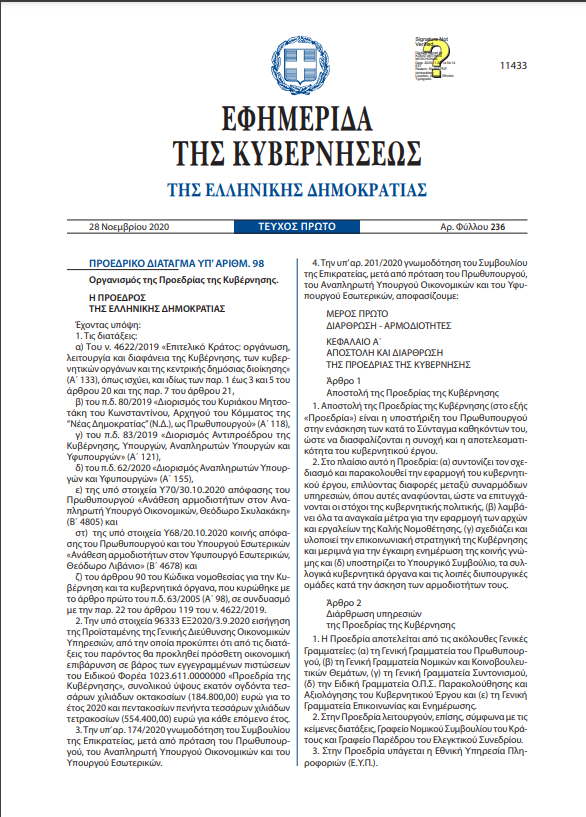
The first page of the Greek Government Gazette Α 236/28.11.2020 including the Presidential Decree No. 98, with which the Presidency of the Government was established

The Executive State (Greek: Επιτελικό Κράτος, romanized: Epiteliko Kratos) is a governance system of the Hellenic Republic established by the First Cabinet of Kyriakos Mitsotakis in August 2019 with the Law 4622/2019 (Greek: Νόμος 4622/2019), the first to be validated during that Parliamentary Period.

Ιn Greece and abroad, the Law 4622/2019, subtitled "Executive State: organisation, operation and transparency of the Government, government bodies and central public administration", is also referred to as the "Executive State" Law.

== Description ==
=== Presidency of the Government ===
The Executive State is a centralised governance system, characterised by the establishment of "the Presidency of the Government", an autonomous public service with approximately 440 personnel (340 permanent and 100 nonpermanent positions), whose formation cost was declared by the government to be 184,800 euros in 2020. (Note: This sum differs from the Presidency of the Government budget; for example, in 2021 the PoG budget was 31,251,000 euros) The Presidency of the Government is controlled by the Prime Minister and consists of a group of Secretariats:

- General Secretariat of the Prime Minister
- General Secretariat of Legal and Parliamentary Affairs
- General Secretariat for Coordination
- Special Secretariat for an Integrated Information System of Monitoring and Evaluating Governmental Action
- General Secretariat of Communication and Information

With the Presidential Decree No. 19 published at the Greek Government Gazette Α 54/14-3-2022 in March 2022, the Special Secretariat for an I.I.S. of Monitoring and Evaluating Governmental Action was discontinued and the Special Secretariat of Foresight replaced it.

=== ERT, AMNA, EYP ===
Most notably, with the Law 4622/2019 the Hellenic Broadcasting Corporation (ERT), the Athens-Macedonian News Agency (AMNA) and the National Intelligence Service (EYP) were passed under direct control of the Presidency of the Government, whose head is the Prime Minister. More specifically, the General Secretariat of Communication and Information was given the supervision of the ERT and AMNA and the National Intelligence Service came under the sole control of the Presidency of the Government.

=== National Transparency Authority ===
The Law 4622/2019 also included the establishment of an Independent Authority named the "National Transparency Authority", which incorporated five formerly separate auditing departments and an anti-corruption body, with the aim of tackling corruption and ensuring transparency and accountability throughout public life.

=== Inter-ministerial personnel ===
With the Law's article 104, provision was made for a group of inter-ministerial employees specialising in Public Policy Analysis, Legislative affairs, and Digital Policy Analysis.
