= Rena Dourou =

Greek political scientist and politician

- Ρένα Δούρου
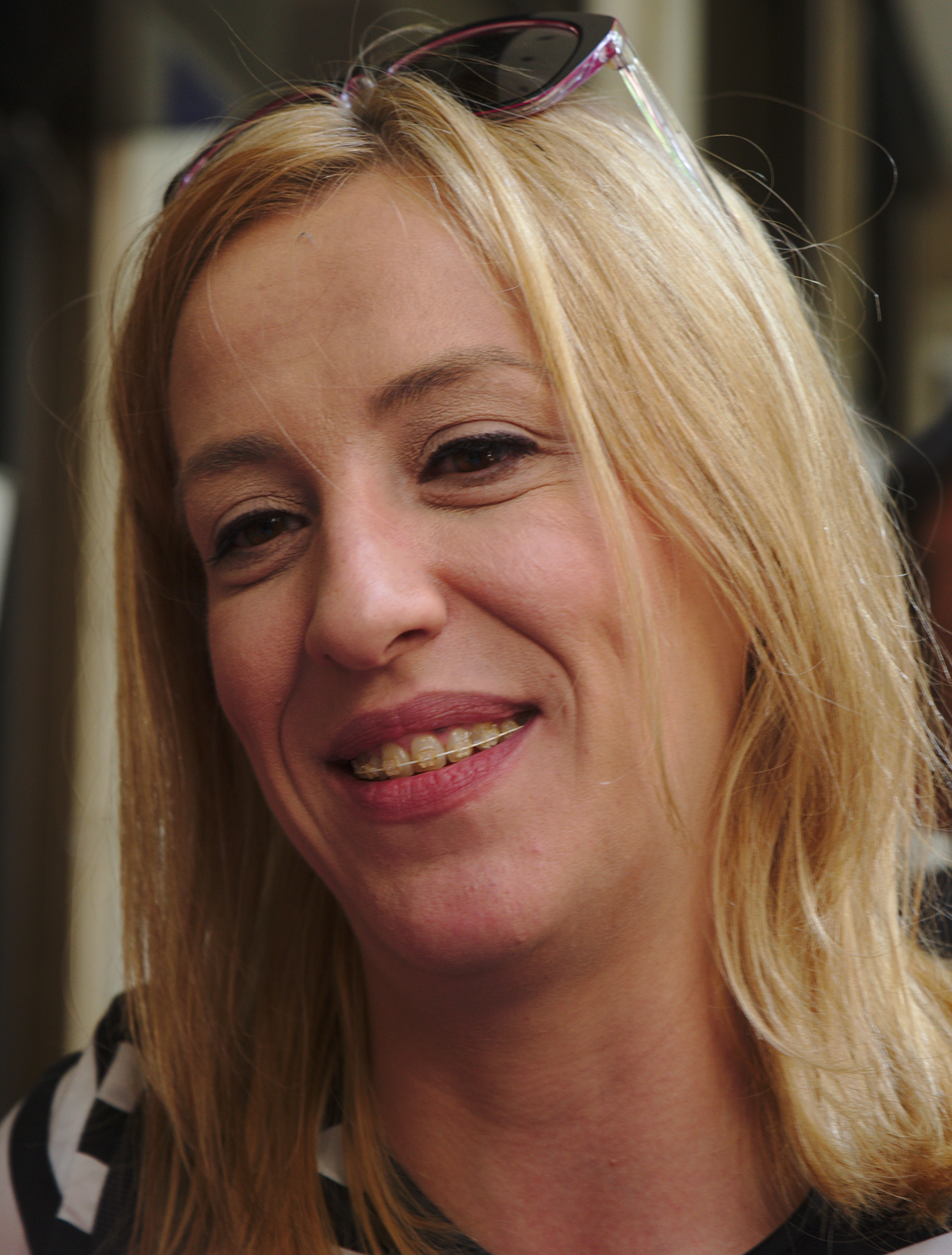
- Rena Dourou in 2015

Regional Governor of Attica
- In office 2014–2019
- Preceded by: Giannis Sgouros
- Succeeded by: Giorgios Patoulis

Personal details
- Born: 1974 (age 51–52) Aigaleo, West Athens, Greece
- Party: Coalition of the Radical Left (Syriza)
- Domestic partner: Giannis Benisis
- Education: National and Kapodistrian University of Athens, University of Essex
- Profession: Political scientist
- Website: www.renadourou.gr

Irene "Rena" Dourou (Greek: Ειρήνη "Ρένα" Δούρου; born 1974) is a Greek political scientist and politician of the Coalition of the Radical Left (Syriza). From 2014 to 2019, she served as the Regional Governor of Attica. She lost re-election to New Democracy candidate Giorgios Patoulis on 7 July 2019.

== Early life and education ==
Born 1974 in Aigaleo to a police officer and a stay-at-home mother, she was raised in the Western Athens suburb of Aigaleo. Active in the anti-globalization movement, she helped found Synaspismos Youth in 1995.

Dourou became a teacher at Athens University. Following her graduation, she was rewarded a scholarship to the University of Essex in the United Kingdom, where she enrolled in political science and earned a master's degree. Though Dourou was encouraged to pursue a Ph.D., she decided to return to Greece, where in 2004 she joined the newly founded left-wing Syriza party.

== Political career ==
In the two consecutive legislative elections of May and June 2012, she was elected a member of the Hellenic Parliament for the suburban Athens B constituency.

In a television appearance on 7 June 2012, far-right Golden Dawn party's MP Ilias Kasidiaris threw a glass of water at Dourou, at which point Liana Kanelli slapped Kasidiaris with pieces of paper in front of her, followed by Kasodsiaris slapping Kanelli repeatedly in the face. The incident caused an uproar, both nationally and internationally.

Following the elections, Dourou was appointed to the Shadow Cabinet of Alexis Tsipras, where she was made responsible for foreign policy. Dourou also organized events and delivered speeches in collaboration with Greek Jewish organizations to commemorate the Holocaust. In 2019, she authored the book "Five Speeches on the Holocaust of Greek Jews".

=== Governor of Attica ===
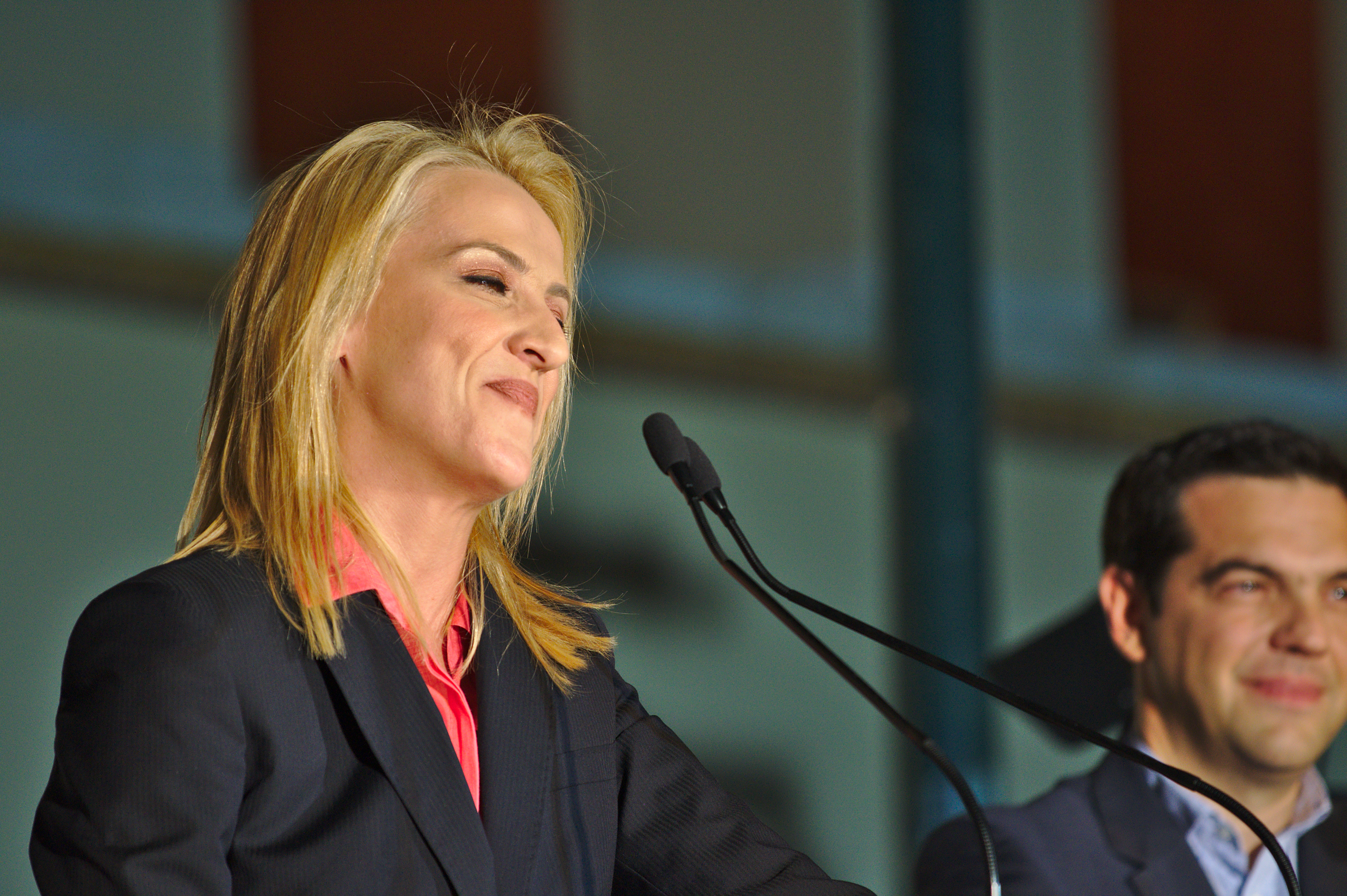
Rena Dourou with Alexis Tsipras 25 May 2015

On 26 March 2014, well ahead of the local elections in May, she ceded her parliamentary seat to her party's first runner-up Eleni Avlonitou, in order to fully concentrate on campaigning for regional governor of Attica. For her all-in decision, she gained further respect, being referred to as the first member of parliament to do so.

Running a door-to-door campaign on an electoral platform called "Power of Life" (Greek: Δύναμη Ζωής), she challenged incumbent Giannis Sgouros, who ran for the social-liberal "Social Values" party, and won the first round. Though in the decisive runoff ballot, Sgouros had the backing of both the New Democracy and PASOK parties, Dourou won with 50.83% of the popular vote. Ahead of Syriza's victory at the January 2015 legislative election, her election as regional governor was widely described as Syriza's biggest victory so far.

In charge of a €575 million annual budget, she immediately increased social welfare spending from €1.9 million to €13.5 million in order to establish food banks, health care for the uninsured. She also ordered tens of thousands disconnected from electricity to be reconnected. She was criticized by Minister of Administrative Reform Kyriakos Mitsotakis for supporting 19 mayors who refused to hand over municipal workers' files for evaluation.

=== Controversies ===
==== Mati Wildfire court case ====
For the Mati Wildfire, which occurred during her Governorship of Attica, the Athens Prosecutor's Office prosecuted Dourou for three misdemeanors, these being arson by negligence, serial homicide by negligence, and serial bodily harm. The Board of Appeals referred her to trial for the misdemeanor offenses of serial homicide by negligence by omission by both liable and non-liable parties, as well as of serial bodily harm. Dourou was referred to the Disciplinary Council of the Prelates, which unanimously acquitted her, considering that there was no breach of duty. The Athens Court of Criminal Appeals, with the consent of the prosecution, unanimously acquitted her of all charges. The Athens Prosecutor's Office appealed the decision, resulting in the case being retried. On 3 June 2025, the Athens Court of Criminal Appeals unanimously acquitted Dourou of all charges for the second time.

==== Mandra Flood court case ====
In 2022, the Athens Prosecutor's Office filed criminal charges against Dourou for negligence, manslaughter by serial negligence, bodily harm, and violation of building regulations regarding the November 2017 floods in Mandra. The Athens Misdemeanor Court acquitted her unanimously on the charge of breach of duty, and by a majority acquitted her on the charges of flooding by omission, and homicide and bodily harm by negligence. The prosecutor appealed against the acquittal, but it was rejected by the Athens Misdemeanor Court of Appeal.

==== Other controversies ====
Dourou was heavily criticised for her decision to scrap four tenders for waste management plants. It was estimated that her decision lost 200 million euros of funding, with ecological implications and a lack of capacity in the Attica waste management system. Deputy Development Minister Notis Mitarakis called on Dourou to "realize the difference between governing and protesting." He also argued that the Attica governor could not cancel the tenders on her own.

Dourou is in favour of the separation of church and state and took a non-religious oath when she was sworn in as governor, eliciting criticism from conservative and right-wing milieus.
