= Sterling Cross Defense Systems =

Canadian arms manufacturer

Sterling Cross Defense Systems, Corp.
- Type: Private
- Industry: arms manufacturer,
- Founded: 2008; 18 years ago
- Founders: Tim Macfarlane
- Headquarters: Abbotsford, British Columbia, Canada
- Areas served: Globally
- Key people: Tim Macfarlane (CEO)
- Website: sterling-cross.com

Sterling Cross Defense Systems is a Canadian arms manufacturer operating in Abbotsford, British Columbia. The company was founded by Tim Macfarlane in 2008. They supply globally to police, military and for commercial use.

== History ==
The company originally started in 2008 as a 10-person company. They started by supplying ammunition to police and military. In 2011, they opened a commercial sector, which allowed for hobby shooters and hunters to purchase their products. Their biggest growth was marked during 2010 to 2012 and was listed by the now defunct Profit (magazine) as the sixth of the fifty fastest growing Canadian companies. Their top customers are from Saudi Arabia.

== Alleged involvement with countries under arms embargo ==
In 2025, verified images on social media showed rifles manufactured by Sterling Cross used by Rapid Support Forces raising concerns about Canadian involvement in the Sudanese civil war.

In June 2026, videos from 2024 were verified to show that rifles from this company were seen in Jebel Moya of Southern Khartoum. In addition, images of these rifles were seen in sanctioned countries such as Libya and Yemen.
