= Penholder (United Nations) =

United Nations members responsible for drafting

In the United Nations Security Council, a penholder is a member with informal responsibility for a particular area of concern. Penholders draft resolutions and organize meetings. They are generally drawn from the P5 (permanent members of the Council) or P3 (US, Britain, and France). Penholdership has no formal status. It nevertheless is "accepted, however unwillingly, as 'the way things are done' by Council members".

== History ==
From 1990, the Secretary General of the United Nations began to convene "Groups of Friends" responsible for particular issues. Members of the Security Council felt such arrangements did not adequately involve them. From mid-2000, the council began to designate lead nations on particular situations, both from its elected and permanent members. From 2008, "penholders" from the P3 "divided most current situations on the agenda among themselves".

Not all penholders have been permanent members. Germany, an elected member, had acted as penholder on Afghanistan. It later jointly held the pen with Britain on Libyan sanctions.

In 2025, China and the US circulated competing drafts, in a dispute over who should act as penholder on Afghanistan. Richard Gowan of the International Crisis Group suggested that US opposition to a growing role for China as a penholder might disrupt UN diplomacy.

== Functioning of the penholder system ==
Penholders exercise substantial informal power over the drafting of resolutions. Drafts by P3 penholders are typically agreed between them, then with China and Russia (the remaining permanent members with the power of veto), and only then elected members. Elected members often refrain from amending resolutions to avoid upsetting consensuses reached between the permanent members. Other members of the council typically defer to the penholder. Inaction by the penholder can lead to perceived paralysis or delay.

Neither Charter of the United Nations nor the council's rules of procedure provide for penholding. Deference to penholders "draw[s] from" the veto held by permanent members, although the P3 hold the pen on disproportionately many issues.

Wu argues that China's lack of participation in the penholding process is "striking", but explained by "a lack of incentives, driven by self-imposed constraints…: low priority given China's development-centric strategy, low necessity due to effective communication with the P3, and insufficient diplomatic competence". However, Chinese relations with the P3 have worsened since the 2020s, and China has increasingly frequently criticised the system.

=== The role of elected members ===
Elected members have cooperated to increase their influence in the council, including by pressuring penholders. A group of five elected members has made proposals concerning Yemen, and proposed to "take the pen" from Britain. A "revolving group of elected members…has taken over penholding for the humanitarian track of the Syrian conflict".

In 2012, Portugal proposed a formalized rotating penholder system, but the proposal was abandoned due to lack of consensus. In 2015, six elected members jointly criticized penholdership for giving undue influence to the permanent members.

=== Codification of informal practice ===
Notes by the presidency of the council have tacitly recognized the penholder system, but stated that "any member of the Security Council may be a penholder", that members may share the pen, that penholders should circulate drafts to all members where possible, and that they should consult all members.

== Current penholders ==
Security Council Report publishes an annual list of penholders.

Penholders (2025)
Country-situation or thematic matter	Penholder
Armenia/Azerbaijan	France
Bosnia and Herzegovina	Rotates among Contact and Drafting Group
Burundi	France
Central Africa (regional office, LRA)	UK
Central Asia (regional office)	Russia
Colombia	UK
Cyprus	UK
Democratic Republic of the Congo	France
North Korea (non-proliferation)	US
Golan Heights (UNDOF)	Russia and the US
Haiti	Panama and the US
Iran (non-proliferation)	US
Iraq/Kuwait	UK
Iraq	US
Lebanon	France
Libya	UK
Libya (authorisation of ship inspections)	France and Greece
Myanmar	UK
Somalia	UK
Sudan	UK
Sudan (sanctions)	US
Sudan/South Sudan	US
Yemen	UK
West Africa, including the Sahel	Sierra Leone and Denmark
Western Sahara	US
Children and armed conflict	Greece
Counter-terrorism	US
International Residual Mechanism for Criminal Tribunals	Sierra Leone
Non-proliferation	Panama
Peacekeeping	UK
Protection of civilians in armed conflict	Denmark and the UK
Women, peace, and security	UK
Sexual violence in conflict	US
Working methods	Denmark and Pakistan
