= Tal Dilian =

Israeli IDF officer and businessman

- Native name: טל דיליאן
- Born: Israel
- Allegiance: Israel
- Branch: Israel Defense Forces
- Service years: 1980s–2002
- Rank: Colonel (reserves)
- Commands: Chief Commander, IDF Technological Unit
- Other work: Founder of Intellexa, Co-founder of Circles, Vice President of Stratasys
- Education: B.A. in Political Science; LL.B. in Law; M.B.A. from Tel Aviv University

Tal Dilian (Hebrew: טל דיליאן) is the Israeli founder of Intellexa, a spyware supplying company, implicated in the 2022 Greek surveillance scandal, and a Colonel in reserves in the Israel Defense Forces (IDF) who was Chief Commander of the army’s secret technology unit.

In 2024, Dilian was sanctioned by the U.S. government. In February 2026, he was convicted by a Greek court for his involvement in the illegal wiretapping of Greek government ministers, military officials, and journalists.

== Early life, education and career ==
Dilian enrolled in the IDF and volunteered in an elite Special Operations Unit after completing the basic training in the paratroopers unit. He then completed the officers' course and served in various commanding positions in the elite unit. Dilian also served in multiple positions in the Intelligence Corps headquarters. In 1994, he joined the Technological Unit of the Intelligence Corps and served as its commander from 1998 to 2002. Following claims of irregularities in his unit, the military investigative police started an investigation against Dilian. His promotion was canceled, and he retired from the IDF in 2002. In 2005, the Israeli newspaper Maariv reported that all charges against him were dismissed.

Dilian was among the founders of the Atidim project, CEO and now a member of the board of directors of the Friends of Atidim Association. Dilian is also an advisor to the Daroma Tzafona association, which promoted the Israeli government’s project for developing the Negev area.

Dilian also worked as a consultant in the field of technology and on the board of directors of multiple high-tech companies. He was a founding partner of start-up companies such as SolarEdge, Vidyo and others.

In 2011, Dilian and Boaz Goldman founded Circles. The company was sold in 2014.

From 2015 to 2017, Dilian was the a vice president of Stratasys, a company that manufactures 3D printers.

== Spyware Scandal ==
In 2019, Dilian founded Intellexa, a company that specializes in data gathering and analysis.

In November 2019, the Cyprus police confiscated a vehicle containing intelligence equipment worth $9 million belonging to the "WiSpear" company founded by Dilian, and in December arrested three employees of the company. The court claimed that the arrest was unjustified and ordered their release two days later. In November 2021, it was decided not to file charges against those involved after no findings of illegal activity were found on a personal level but the company itself was fined 960 thousand euros for a series of privacy violations. In February 2022, the court in Larnaca also found the company guilty of a series of privacy, communications and customs offenses after a lengthy investigation in which it was revealed that the company illegally extracted information from wireless internet systems it was asked to install at Hermes airport. In October 2022, a Greek investigative journalist submitted a request to the prosecutor's office in Greece to investigate criminal suspicion against Dilian and the company.

He and his partner Sara Alexandra Faisal Hammo, along with Intellexa, were sanctioned by the US Government on March 3, 2024.

== Education ==
Dilian holds a bachelor's degree in political science, another degree in law, and a master's degree in business administration from Tel Aviv University.
