= Christos Spirtzis =

Greek engineer and politician

- Χρήστος Σπίρτζης
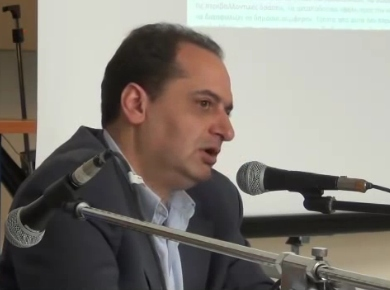

Minister of Infrastructure, Transport and Networks
- In office 5 November 2016 – 9 July 2019
- Prime Minister: Alexis Tsipras
- Succeeded by: Kostas Karamanlis

Alternate Minister of Infrastructure, Transport and Networks
- In office 28 January 2015 – 28 August 2015
- Prime Minister: Alexis Tsipras
- Succeeded by: Christos Zois

Personal details
- Born: 7 March 1969 (age 57) Athens, Greece
- Party: Independent
- Spouse: Dimitra Foufri
- Children: 2 (Panagiotis, Kallia)
- Education: Democritus University of Thrace
- Profession: Electrical engineer

Christos Spirtzis (Greek: Χρήστος Σπίρτζης; born 1969) is a Greek engineer and centre-left independent politician. From 2015 to 2019, he served as the Minister of Infrastructure and Transport in the government of Alexis Tsipras.

== Biography ==
=== Early life and education ===
Born 1969 in Athens and raised in the nearby Ampelokipoi, Spirtzis studied Electrical engineering at the Democritus University of Thrace.

=== Professional career ===
In 1999 he was appointed a member of the Economic and Social Committee of Greece, a post he would hold until 2008. One year later, in 2000, Spirtzis was elected to the executive committee of the Technical Chamber of Greece (TEE). In 2007, he became vice president responsible for energy, development, employment, insurance, licensing, publications, ethics in representation, and the databank. In September 2010, he was promoted to the post of the president of the chamber. Presiding over the Democratic Coalition of Technicians (Δημοκρατικής Συμπαράταξης Μηχανικών), he was re-elected as president of TEE in 2013. He also chairs the Hellenic National Committee at the World Energy Council.

=== Political career ===
Spirtzis, who has been described as a "child" of social-democratic PASOK, however wasn't hesitant to clash with his party, especially in strongly opposing the Memorandum. After the January 2015 legislative election, Spirtzis was appointed Alternate Minister of Infrastructure, Transport and Networks by the Syriza-led government of Alexis Tsipras. He was sworn in on 28 January 2015, one day later than most ministers, as the Council of State had to approve the merging of ministries first. Announcing that the government would stop the privatization of fourteen regional airports, he said: "The central position of the government is to stop the privatizations of infrastructure which serve and can help the development of the country." In an article published by Politico, Spirtzis was mentioned as one of the two former ministers suspected by EPPO prosecutors for breach of duty in connection with the Tempi train crash in Feb 28 2023 where 57 people were killed.
