= Giorgios Patoulis =

Greek politician and surgeon (born 1961)

George Patoulis Γιώργος Πατούλης
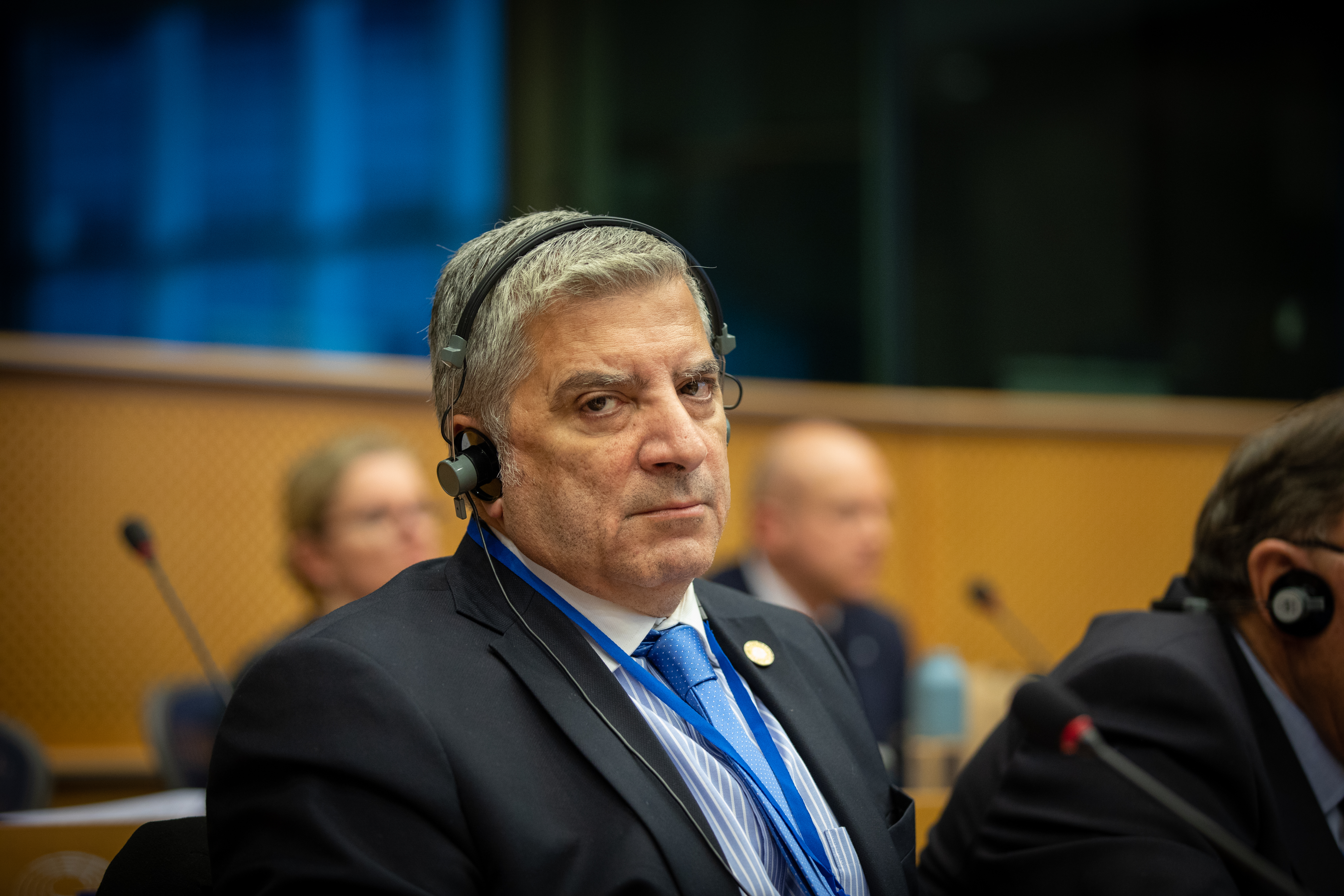

Regional Governor of Attica
- In office September 1, 2019 – December 31, 2023
- Preceded by: Rena Dourou
- Succeeded by: Nikos Hardalias

Mayor of Marousi
- In office January 1, 2007 – August 31, 2019

Personal details
- Born: 14 May 1961 (age 65) Athens, Greece
- Party: New Democracy
- Spouse: Marina Stauraki (m. 1986; div. 2021) Anastasia koilou (m. 2024)
- Children: 2
- Education: National and Kapodistrian University of Athens (MD)

Giorgos Patoulis (Greek: Γιώργος Πατούλης, born May 14, 1961) is a Greek politician and surgeon. He served as Regional Governor of Attica from 2019 to 2023. He is also President of Athens Medical Association, since 2011. He is a member of the New Democracy.

Patoulis previously served as Mayor of Marousi, from 2007 to 2019, and as President of the Central Union of Municipalities of Greece (KEDE) from 2014 to 2019.

== Biography ==
Giorgos Patoulis was born in Athens, Greece on May 14, 1961, and both his parents come from the island of Crete. He earned a M.D. degree, from School of Medicine of National and Kapodistrian University of Athens, in 1987. After completing his residency in orthopedic surgery, he earned a PhD. He has specialized in Health Economics, from 1998 to 2000, and graduated from the National School of Public Health of Greece.

He worked as a doctor in Tavros Institution of Social Security and in the one of Marousi-Erythraia. He has also been scientific associate of the Hospital “Errikos Ntynan”, the “Athenian Clinic” and Lykovrysi Open Care Centre for the Elderly.

In 2011 and 2018, Patoulis was elected as Ρresident of the Athens Medical Association (I.S.A.), a position he holds until today.

=== Political career ===
His political career began as Member of Pefki City Council, in 1998. He has served as the President of the Municipal Council of the Municipality of Pefki. Also, he was served as Mayor of Marousi from January, 2007 to August 2019. In 2014, he was elected as President of the Central Union of Municipalities of Greece, a post he served until 2019.

In 2019, he was elected as Governor of Attica Region, the largest metropolitan region of Greece, with 66% of the votes. In February 2020, as Governor of Attica and as member of European People's Party, he was elected as vice president and head of the Greek delegation at the European Committee of the Regions for the 2020–2025 period.
