= Tsoucalas =

Tsoucalas is a surname. Notable people with the surname include:

- Constantine Tsoucalas (1937–2026), Greek sociologist, academic, and politician
- Nicholas Tsoucalas (1926–2018), American lawyer
