= Constantine Tsoucalas =

Greek sociologist and politician (1937–2026)

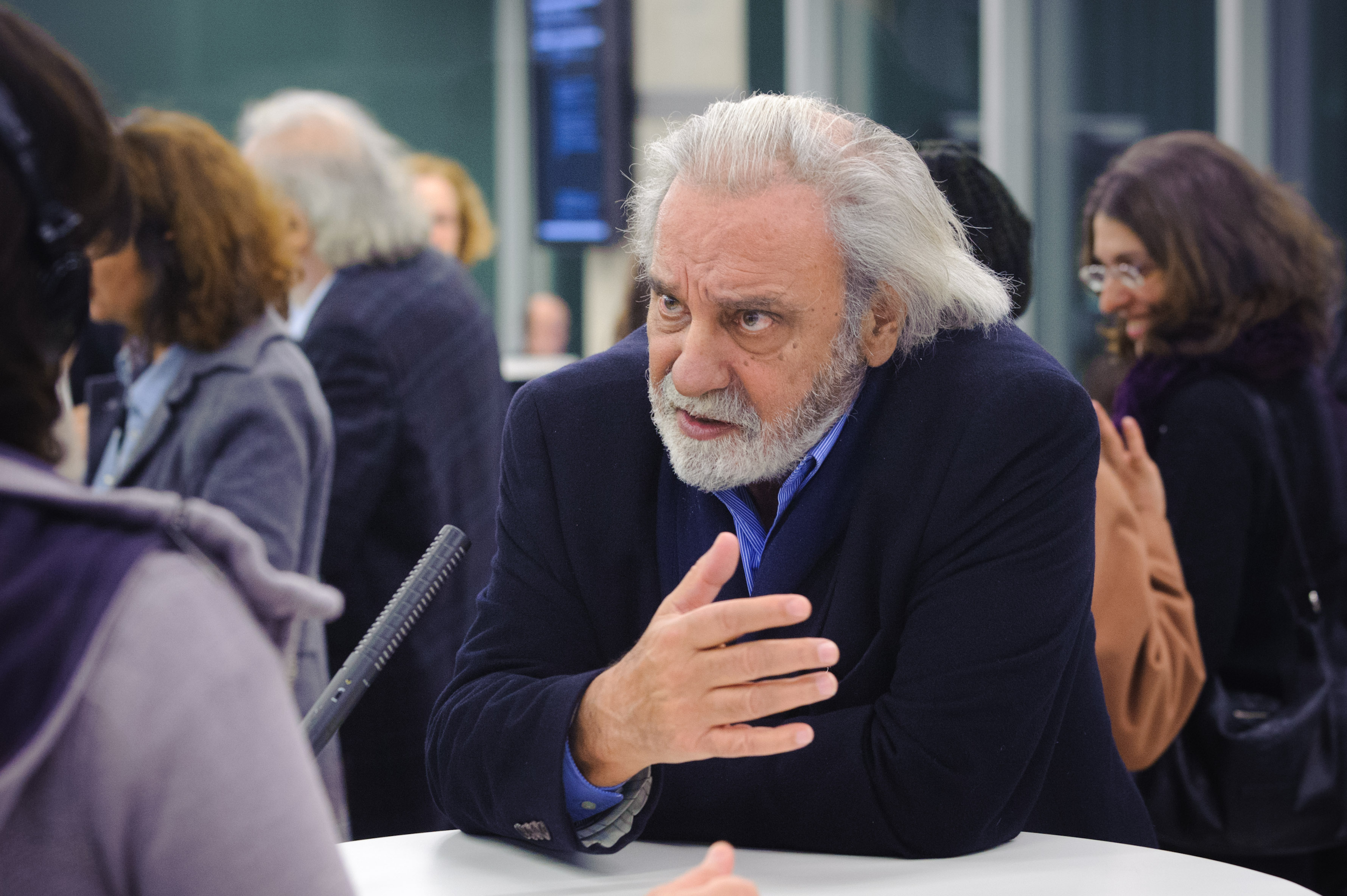
Tsoucalas in 2012

Constantine Tsoucalas (Greek: Κωνσταντίνος Τσουκαλάς; 5 August 1937 – 17 August 2026) was a Greek sociologist, academic and politician.

Tsoucalas taught at Greek, American, French and Mexican universities and served, among other things, as president of the National Center for Social Research and a state MP for Syriza.

Tsoucalas died on 18 August 2026, aged 89.
