= List of members of the Hellenic Parliament, 2019 =

18th (ΙH΄)^{a} Plenary Session
←	17th (ΙZ΄)	19th (ΙΘ΄)	→
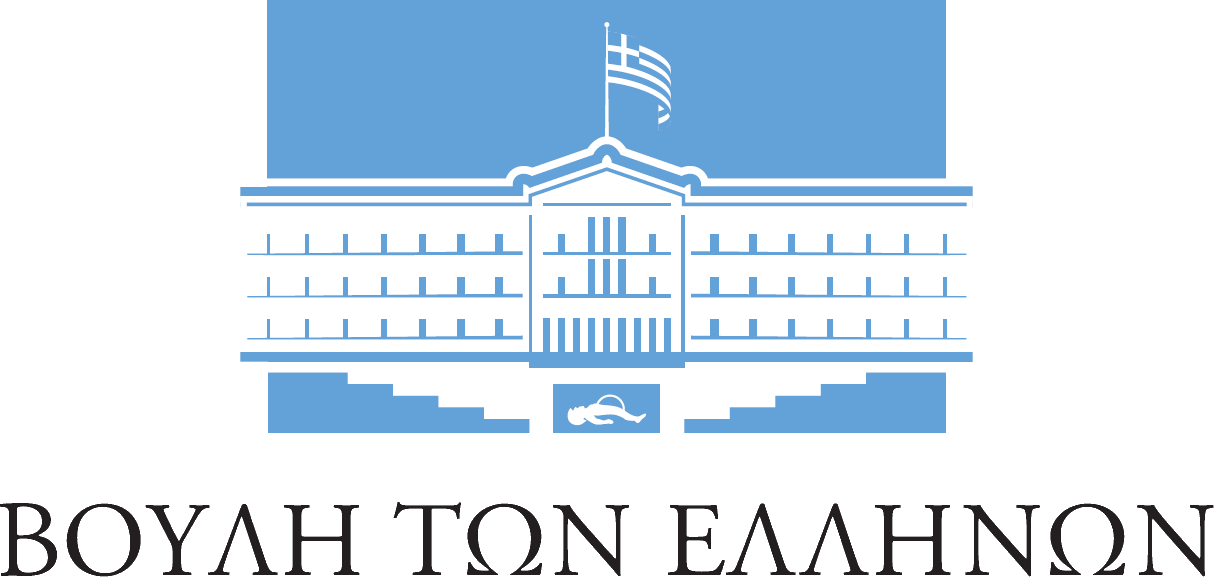

Overview
- Legislative body: Hellenic Parliament
- Jurisdiction: Greece
- Meeting place: Old Royal Palace, Athens
- Term: 17 July 2019 – 22 April 2023
- Election: 2019 Greek legislative election
- Government: First Cabinet of Kyriakos Mitsotakis
- Members: 300
- President: Konstantinos Tasoulas (ND)
- First Vice President: Nikitas Kaklamanis (ND)
- Second Vice President: Haralambos Athanasiou (ND)
- Third Vice President: Athanasios Bouras (ND)
- Fourth Vice President: Dimitris Vitsas (SYRIZA)

Sessions
- 1st: 17 July 2019 – 2 October 2020
- 2nd: 5 October 2020 – 1 October 2021
- 3rd: 4 October 2021 – 30 September 2022
- 4th: 3 October 2022 – 11 April 2023

This is a list of the 300 members who were elected to the Hellenic Parliament – for the 18th parliamentary term (ΙΗ΄ in Greek numerals) – in the 2019 legislative election, held on 7 July 2019.

The parliament convened on 17 July 2019. The New Democracy party won the majority of seats (158) and its leader, Kyriakos Mitsotakis, formed his first government.

== Composition ==
Initial composition (July 2019)	Final composition (April 2023)
Communist Party of Greece: 15 MeRA25: 9 Syriza: 86 Movement for Change: 22 New Democracy: 158 Greek Solution: 10	Communist Party of Greece: 15 MeRA25: 6 Syriza: 87 Movement for Change: 22 New Democracy: 156 Greek Solution: 10 Independents: 4

== Members of Parliament by party ==
=== New Democracy ===
Constituency and party votes	Full name	Notes
Nationwide (2,251,618 votes)	Panagiotis Pikrammenos	
Nationwide (2,251,618 votes)	~~Marietta Giannakou~~ (until 27 February 2022); Theodoros Skylakakis (from 3 March 2022)	Marietta Giannakou passed away on 27 February 2022 and her place was taken by Theodoros Skylakakis
Nationwide (2,251,618 votes)	Giorgos Gerapetritis	
Nationwide (2,251,618 votes)	Takis Theodorikakos	
Nationwide (2,251,618 votes)	Christos Tarantilis	
Athens A (100,473)	Olga Kefalogianni	
Athens A (100,473)	Vassilis Kikilias	
Athens A (100,473)	Thanos Plevris	
Athens A (100,473)	Nikitas Kaklamanis	
Athens A (100,473)	Angelos Syrigos	
Athens A (100,473)	~~Konstantinos Bogdanos~~	Konstantinos Bogdanos was expelled on 5 October 2021 from the party after a social media post that was considered to be a violation of human rights. He did not surrender his seat and became independent.
Athens A (100,473)	Fotini Pipili	
Athens B1 (152,558)	Kostis Hatzidakis	
Athens B1 (152,558)	Adonis Georgiadis	
Athens B1 (152,558)	Niki Kerameus	
Athens B1 (152,558)	Georgios Koumoutsakos	
Athens B1 (152,558)	Theodoros Roussopoulos	
Athens B1 (152,558)	Dimitris Kairidis	
Athens B1 (152,558)	Zoi Rapti	
Athens B2 (65,590 )	Kyriakos Mitsotakis	
Athens B2 (65,590 )	Miltiadis Varvitsiotis	
Athens B2 (65,590 )	Giannis Loverdos	
Athens B3 (144,645)	Nikos Dendias	
Athens B3 (144,645)	Konstantinos Kyranakis	
Athens B3 (144,645)	Dionysis Hatzidakis	
Athens B3 (144,645)	Harry Theoharis	
Athens B3 (144,645)	Anna Karamanli	
Athens B3 (144,645)	Sofia Voultepsi	
Athens B3 (144,645)	Babis Papadimitriou	
Athens B3 (144,645)	Giannis Kallianos	
Athens B3 (144,645)	Vassilis Spanakis	
Piraeus A (44,160)	Konstantinos Katsafados	
Piraeus A (44,160)	Ioannis Melas	
Piraeus A (44,160)	Nikolaos Manolakos	
Piraeus A (44,160)	Noni Dounia	
Piraeus A (44,160)	Christoforos Boutsikakis	
Piraeus B (44,441)	Ioannis Tragakis	
Piraeus B (44,441)	Dimitris Markopoulos	
East Attica (100,583)	Georgía Martínou	
East Attica (100,583)	Makis Voridis	
East Attica (100,583)	George Vlachos	
East Attica (100,583)	Vassilis Oikonomou	
West Attica (26.131 )	Athanasios Bouras	
West Attica (26.131 )	Evangelos Liakos	
West Attica (26.131 )	George Kotsiras	
Aetolia-Acarnania (55.440)	Kostas Karagkounis	
Aetolia-Acarnania (55.440)	Marios Salmas	
Aetolia-Acarnania (55.440)	Spilios Livanos	
Argolis (25,024)	John Andrianos	
Arcadia (25,542)	Kostas Vlasis	
Arta (18,953)	George Stylios	
Achaea (55,235)	Angelos Tsigkris	
Achaea (55,235)	Andreas Katsaniotis	
Achaea (55,235)	Jason Fotilas	
Achaea (55,235)	Christina Alexopoulou	
Boeotia (23.759)	Andreas Koutsoumpas	
Grevena (9.701)	~~Andreas Patsis~~	On 25 October 2022, the MP was expelled from New Democracy following allegations of business activities for the acquisition of "red loans". The MP did not resign his seat and declared his independence.
Drama (25.672)	Konstantinos Blouchos	
Dodecanese (40.034)	Manos Konsolas	
Dodecanese (40.034)	Vasilis Ypsilantis	
Dodecanese (40.034)	Mika Iatridi	
Dodecanese (40.034)	Ioannis Pappas	
Evros (37.730)	Tasos Dimoschakis	
Evros (37.730)	Christos Dermentzopoulos	
Evros (37.730)	Stavros Keletsis	
Euboea (44,752)	Simos Kedikoglou	
Euboea (44,752)	Thanasis Zebilis	
Euboea (44,752)	Spiros Pnevmatikos	
Evrytania (6,969)	Kostas Kontogiorgos	
Zakynthos (9,217)	Dionysis Aktypis	
Elis (33,673)	Dionysia Avgerinopoulou	
Elis (33,673)	Konstantinos Tzavaras	
Elis (33,673)	Andreas Nikolakopoulos	
Imathia (33,787)	Apostolos Vesyropoulos	
Imathia (33,787)	Tasos Bartzokas	
Imathia (33,787)	Lazaros Tsavdaridis	
Heraklion (51,579)	Lefteris Avgenakis	
Heraklion (51,579)	Maximos Senetakis	
Thesprotia (12,579)	Vasileios Giogiakas	
Thessaloniki A (107,429)	Kostas Karamanlis	
Thessaloniki A (107,429)	Konstantinos Gioulekas	
Thessaloniki A (107,429)	Elena Rapti	
Thessaloniki A (107,429)	Stavros Kalafatis	
Thessaloniki A (107,429)	Stratos Simopoulos	
Thessaloniki A (107,429)	Anna Efthymiou	
Thessaloniki A (107,429)	Dimitris Kouvelas	
Thessaloniki B (80,327)	Theodoros Karaoglou	
Thessaloniki B (80,327)	Savvas Anastasiadis	
Thessaloniki B (80,327)	Dimitris Vartzopoulos	
Ioannina (36,538)	Konstantinos Tasoulas	Speaker of the Hellenic Parliament
Ioannina (36,538)	Stavros Kalogiannis	
Ioannina (36,538)	Maria Kefala	
Ioannina (36,538)	Georgios Amyras	
Kavala (32,737)	Nikolaos Panagiotopoulos	
Kavala (32,737)	Yannis Paschalidis	
Kavala (32,737)	Makarios Lazaridis	
Karditsa (34,668)	Konstantinos Tsiaras	
Karditsa (34,668)	Giorgos Kotsos	
Karditsa (34,668)	Asimina Skondra	
Kastoria (15,452)	Zisis Tzikalagias	
Corfu (19,525)	Stefanos Gikas	
Kefalonia (8,625)	Panagis Kappatos	
Kilkis (23,281)	George Georgantas	
Kozani (35,891)	Stathis Konstantinidis	
Kozani (35,891)	Paraskevi Vryzidou	
Kozani (35,891)	Michail (Michalis) Papadopoulos	
Kozani (35,891)	Georgios Amanatidis	
Corinthia (35,173)	Christos Dimas	
Corinthia (35,173)	Nikos Tagaras	
Corinthia (35,173)	~~Marilena Vilialis-Soukoulis (until 1 July 2021)~~; Kostas Kollias (from 1 July 2021	After a recount, the electoral court awarded the seat to Kostas Kollias.
Cyclades (31,370)	Giannis Vroutsis	
Cyclades (31,370)	Katerina Monogyou	
Cyclades (31,370)	Filippos Fortomas	
Cyclades (31,370)	Markos Kafouros	
Laconia (26,432)	Thanasis Davakis	
Laconia (26,432)	Neoclis Kritikos	
Larissa (61,468)	Maximos Charakopoulos	
Larissa (61,468)	Christos Kellas	
Larissa (61,468)	Stella Biziou	
Lasithi (14,276)	Giannis Plakiotakis	
Lesbos (22,674)	Charalambos Athanasiou	
Lefkada (6,778)	Thanasis Kavvadas	
Magnesia (41,334)	Christos Boukoros	
Magnesia (41,334)	Zetta Makri	
Magnesia (41,334)	Thanasis Lioupis	
Magnesia (41,334)	Kostas Maravegias	
Messenia (44,262)	Antonis Samaras	
Messenia (44,262)	Yannis Lambropoulos	
Messenia (44,262)	Miltos Chrysomallis	
Messenia (44,262)	Pericles Mantas	
Xanthi (22,347)	Spyros Tsilingiris	
Pella (36,148)	George Karasmanis	
Pella (36,148)	Dionysis Stamenitis	
Pella (36,148)	Lakis Vasiliadis	
Pieria (35,775)	Fontas Baraliakos	
Pieria (35,775)	Anna Mani Papadimitriou	
Pieria (35,775)	Savvas Chionidis	
Preveza (16,864)	Stergios Giannakis	
Rethymno (17,018)	Ioannis A. Kefalogiannis	
Rhodope (23,123)	Euripides Stylianides	
Samos (8,345)	Christodoulos Stefanadis	
Serres (53,839)	Kostas Karamanlis	
Serres (53,839)	Fotini Arabatzi	
Serres (53,839)	Tasos Hatzivasileiou	
Serres (53,839)	Theofilos Leontaridis	
Trikala (37,638)	Kostas Skrekas	
Trikala (37,638)	Thanasis Lioutas	
Trikala (37,638)	Katerina Papakosta	
Phthiotis (41,076)	Christos Staikouras	
Phthiotis (41,076)	Giannis Oikonomou	
Phthiotis (41,076)	George Kotronias	
Phthiotis (41,076)	~~Themis Cheimaras (until 4 December 2023)~~; Eleni Makri Theodorou (from 4 December 2023)	The MP resigned following revelations that he had continued his business activities after being elected – Greek law prohibits sitting MPs from engaging in business activities.
Florina (12,701)	Ioannis Antoniadis	
Phocis (10,839)	Yannis Bougas	
Chalkidiki (26,702)	Georgios Vagionas	
Chania (28,842)	Dora Bakoyannis	
Chania (28,842)	~~Manousos Voloudakis(until 8 February 2023)~~; Giannis Kasselakis (from 14 February 2023	Manousos Voloudakis passed away.
Chania (28,842)	Vasileios Digalakis	
Chios (13,894)	Notis Mitarachi	

=== Syriza ===
Constituency and party votes	Full name	Notes
Nationwide (1,781,057)	Vasilis Vasilikos	
Nationwide (1,781,057)	Effie Achtsioglou	
Nationwide (1,781,057)	Panos Skourletis	
Nationwide (1,781,057)	Alekos Flambouraris	
Athens A (74,272)	Nikolaos Voutsis	
Athens A (74,272)	Dimitris Tzanakopoulos	
Athens A (74,272)	Nikos Filis	
Athens A (74,272)	Christoforos Vernardakis	
Athens A (74,272)	Angeliki Adamopoulou	She joined SYRIZA from 22 December 2022 until 17 February 2023 when she became independent and announced her withdrawal from politics at the end of her parliamentary term
Athens B1 (93,992)	Efkleidis Tsakalotos	
Athens B1 (93,992)	Konstantinos Zachariadis	
Athens B1 (93,992)	Mariliza Xenogiannakopoulou	
Athens B1 (93,992)	Georgios Katrougalos	
Athens B2 (85,268)	Ioannis Dragasakis	
Athens B2 (85,268)	Dimitrios Vitsas	
Athens B2 (85,268)	Chara Kafantari	
Athens B2 (85,268)	~~Athanasios Papachristopoulos~~ (until 13 January 2021); Panagiotis Kouroumblis (from 13 January 2021)	After a recount, the electoral court awarded the seat to Panagiotis Kouroumblis.
Athens B3 (117,296)	Nikos Pappas	
Athens B3 (117,296)	Theano Fotiou	
Athens B3 (117,296)	Ioannis Mouzalas	
Athens B3 (117,296)	Ioannis Balafas	
Athens B3 (117,296)	Rallia Christidou	
Piraeus A (30,011)	Theodoros Dritsas	
Piraeus B (56,264)	Nina Kasimati	
Piraeus B (56,264)	Ioannis Ragkousis	
Piraeus B (56,264)	Tryfon Alexiadis	
Piraeus B (56,264)	Fotini Bakathima	She joined SYRIZA on 21 December 2022
East Attica (69,043)	Alexios Tsipras	
East Attica (69,043)	Christos Spirtzis	
East Attica (69,043)	Nasos Athanasiou	
West Attica (27,627)	Giorgos Tsipras	
Aetolia-Acarnania (45,889)	Georgios Varemenos	
Aetolia-Acarnania (45,889)	Thanos Moraitis	
Argolis (14,400)	Giannis Gkiolas	
Arcadia (18,085)	Giorgos Papailiou	
Arta (19,411)	Olga Gerovasili	
Achaea (68,588)	Alexis Tsipras	
Achaea (68,588)	Sia Anagnostopoulou	
Achaea (68,588)	Konstantinos Markou	
Boeotia (21,150)	Yota Poulou	
Drama (13,288)	Theofilos Xanthopoulos	
Dodecanese (28,826)	~~Nektarios Santorinios until 13 February 2023~~; Dimitris Gakis from 17 February 2023	Santorinios passed away.
Evros (23,103)	Natasa Gkara	
Euboea (42,672)	Evangelos Apostolou	
Euboea (42,672)	Miltiadis Chatzigiannakis	
Elis (32,536)	Dionysis Kalamatianos	
Imathia (21,742)	~~Effrosyni Karasarlidou (until 1 July 2021)~~; Angelos Tolkas(from 1 July 2021)	After a recount, the electoral court awarded the seat to Angelos Tolkas.
Heraklion (73,940)	Haris Mamoulakis	
Heraklion (73,940)	Sokratis Vardakis	
Heraklion (73,940)	Nikolaos Igoumenidis	
Thesprotia (9,643)	Marios Katsis	
Thessaloniki A (94,693)	Katerina Notopoulou	
Thessaloniki A (94,693)	Ioannis Amanatidis	
Thessaloniki A (94,693)	Christos Giannoulis	
Thessaloniki A (94,693)	Kostas Zouraris	
Thessaloniki A (94,693)	Alexandros Triantafyllidis	
Thessaloniki B (46,947)	Sokratis Famellos	
Thessaloniki B (46,947)	Dora Avgeri	
Ioannina (35,451)	Meropi Tzoufi	
Kavala (20,159)	Soultana Eleftheriadou	
Karditsa (23,502)	Spyros Lappas	
Kastoria (8,338)	Olympia Teligioridou	
Corfu (19,119)	Alexandros Avlonitis	
Kilkis (12,765)	Eirini Agathopoulou	
Kozani (28,606)	Calliope Vetta	
Corinthia (25,856)	Georgios Psychogios	
Cyclades (20,403)	Nikolaos Syrmalenios	
Lakonia (10,397)	Stavros Arachovitis	
Larissa (48,884)	Vasilis Kokkalis	
Larissa (48,884)	Anna Vagena	
Lasithi (14,379)	Emmanouil Thrapsaniotis	
Lesvos (16,868)	Ioannis Bournous	
Magnesia (34,298)	Alexandros Meikopoulos	
Magnesia (34,298)	Aikaterini Papanatsiou	
Messinia (30,590)	Alexis Haritsis	
Xanthi (24,059)	Chousein Zeimpek	
Pella (24,375)	Theodora Tzakri	
Pieria (17,590)	Betty Skoufa	
Preveza (13,337)	Kostas Barkas	
Rethymno (17,223)	Andreas Xanthos	
Rodopi (16,603)	Takis Charitou	
Serres (26,055)	Eleftherios Avramakis	
Trikala (25,042)	Athanasios Papadopoulos	
Phthiotis (29,677)	Yannis Sarakiotis	
Florina (11,556)	Peti Perka	
Chalkidiki (15,244)	Kyriaki Malama	
Chania (31,644)	Pavlos Polakis	
Chios (6,739)	Andreas Michailidis	

=== PASOK – Movement for Change ===
Constituency and party votes	Full name	Notes
Nationwide (457,623)	Georgios Kaminis	
Athens A (12,255)	Konstantinos Skandalidis	
Athens B1 (18,615)	Andreas Loverdos	
Athens B2 (13,262)	Nadia Giannakopoulou	
Athens B3 (20,958)	~~Fofi Gennimata until 25 October 2021~~; Tonia Antoniou (from 1 November 2022)	Fofi Gennimata passed away. She replaced from Tonia Antoniou.
Aetolia-Acarnania (13,865)	Dimitrios Konstantopoulos	
Argolis (8,548)	Andreas Poulas	
Arcadia (6,489)	Odysseas Konstantinopoulos	
Arta (4,103)	Christos Gkokas	
Achaea (15,176)	George Papandreou	
Boeotia (6,355)	George Mulkiotis	
Drama (7,199)	Hara Kefalidou	
Elis (13,817)	Michail Katrinis	
Heraklion (19.471)	Vassilis Kegeroglou	
Thessaloniki A (18,313)	Haris Kastanidis	
Thessaloniki B (12,420)	Georgios Arvanitidis	
Corfu (4,166)	Dimitris Biagis	
Kilkis (6,163)	Georgios Frangidis	
Larissa (13,742)	Evangelia Liakoulis	
Xanthi (5,333)	Mpourchan Mparan	
Rhodope (13,405)	Ilchan Achmet	
Chalkidiki (6,500)	Apostolos Panas	

=== Communist Party of Greece ===
Constituency and party votes	Full name	Notes
Nationwide (299,621)	Aleka Papariga	
Athens A (15,122)	Liana Kanelli	
Athens B1 (20,604)	Thanasis Pafilis	
Athens B2 (19,100)	Dimitris Koutsoumpas	
Athens B3 (26,132)	Christos Katsotis	
Piraeus B (11,812)	Diamanto Manolakou	
Attica A (11,561)	~~Eleni Gerasimidou~~; Ioannis Giokas	The MP resigned due to workload and handed over the seat to the first runner-up of the party.
Aetolia-Acarnania (6,669)	Nikolaos Papanastasis	
Achaea (9,283)	Nikolaos Karathanasopoulos	
Euboea (6,091)	George Marinos	
Heraklion (6,109)	Manolis Syntyhakis	
Thessaloniki A (16,037)	Giannis Delis	
Thessaloniki B (8,603)	Leonidas Stoltidis	
Larissa (9,772)	Giorgos Lamproulis	
Lesbos (5,839)	Maria Komninaka	

=== Greek Solution ===
Constituency and party votes	Full name	Notes
Nationwide (209,290)	Vasileios Villiardos	
Athens B1 (8,471)	Anastasia Alexopoulou	
Athens B2 (7,750)	Maria Athanasiou	
Athens B3 (10,965)	Dimitrios Vagenas	
Piraeus B (6,186)	Sophia Asimakopoulou	
Attica A (11,315)	Antonios Mylonakis	
Thessaloniki A (16,289)	Apostolos Avdelas	
Thessaloniki B (10,555)	Kostas Chitas	
Larissa (6,794)	Kyriakos Velopoulos	
Serres (6,852)	Kostas Boubas	

=== MeRA25 ===
Constituency and party votes	Full name	Notes
Athens A (9,107)	~~Angeliki Adamopoulou~~	On 8 March 2022 the MP resigned and became independent, accusing the party of undermining her.
Athens B1 (13,825)	Kleon Grigoriadis	
Athens B2 (9,445)	Kriton Arsenis	
Athens B3 (16,252)	Sofia Sakorafa	
Piraeus B (6,479)	~~Foteini Bakadima~~	On 24 October 2022, became independent from the parliamentary group without giving any reasons for her move. Two months later she joined SYRIZA.
East Attica (9,029)	Maria Apatzidi	
Heraklion (6,902)	Georgios Logiadis	
Thessaloniki A (14,410)	Yanis Varoufakis	
Thessaloniki B (7,577)	~~Konstantina Adamou~~	On 23 April 2021 the MP became independent, accusing the party president of authoritarian and undemocratic behavior.

=== Independents ===
Constituency	Full name	Resign from
Athens A	Konstantinos Bogdanos	New Democracy
Athens A	Angeliki Adamopoulou	MeRA25 / SYRIZA
Grevena	Andreas Patsis	New Democracy
Thessaloniki B	Konstantina Adamou	MeRA25

== Note ==
- ^a The parliamentary terms are numbered in consecutive order from 1975, with Greek numbering.

== Sources ==
- Ministry of Interior
- Hellenic Parliament
