= List of members of the Hellenic Parliament, May 2023 =

19th (ΙΘ΄)^{a} Plenary Session
←	18th (ΙΗ΄)	20th (Κ΄)	→
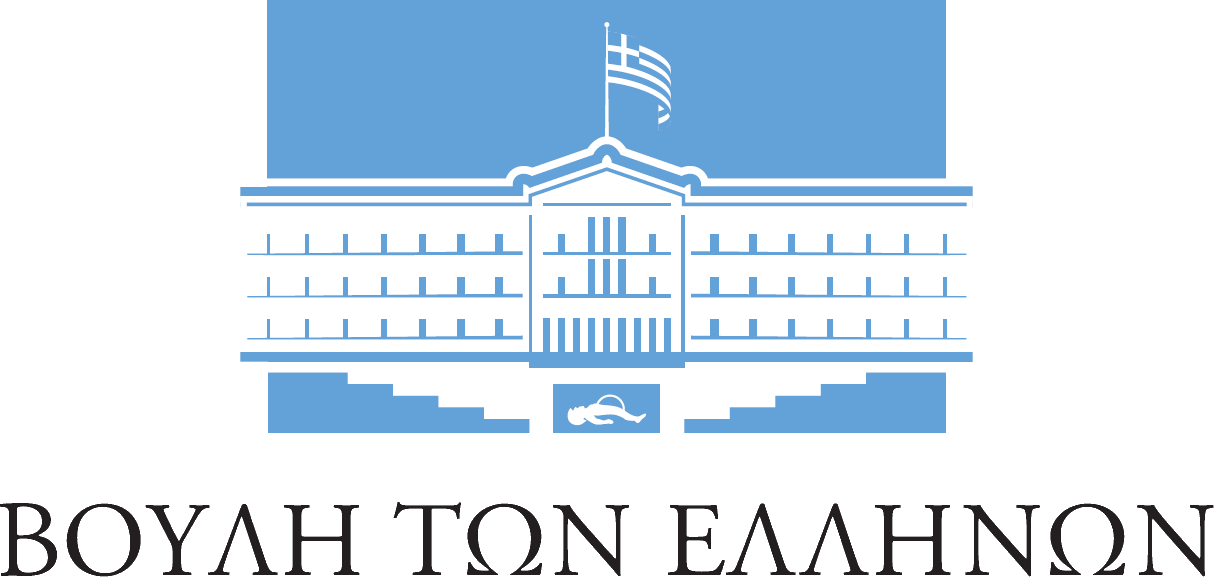

Overview
- Legislative body: Hellenic Parliament
- Jurisdiction: Greece
- Meeting place: Old Royal Palace, Athens
- Term: 28 May 2023 – 3 July 2023
- Election: 21 May 2023
- Government: Second Cabinet of Kyriakos Mitsotakis
- Members: 300
- President: Konstantinos Tasoulas (ND)
- First Vice President: Nikitas Kaklamanis (ND)
- Second Vice President: Haralambos Athanasiou (ND)
- Third Vice President: Athanasios Bouras (ND)
- Fourth Vice President: Meropi Tzoufi (SYRIZA)

Sessions
- 1st: 28 May 2023 – 29 May 2023

This is the list of the elected members of the 19th Plenary session of the Hellenic Parliament as it emerged after the results of the national elections held on 21 May 2023. The resulting parliament held only two sittings, the first to swear in its members and the second to elect its president and vice-presidents. This is the second so called "fleeting" Parliament in the country's post-war history, after the two-day Parliament that emerged from the polls on 6 May 2012.

The elections saw an unprecedented historic victory for New Democracy in terms of size and scale, and a similarly crushing defeat for Syriza, but no party won an overall majority. As a result, the President of the Republic, with the agreement of all parties, called for by-election, which was held on 25 June 2023 by the caretaker government of Ioannis Sarmas.

== Parliamentary procedure ==
The MPs elected were sworn in on Sunday 28 May 2023, in the presence of the President of the Republic Katerina Sakellaropoulou, the Prime Minister of the caretaker government, the Ministers of the Government and a number of ambassadors.
The following day, Monday 29 May, the election of the Presidium took place. Konstantinos Tasoulas was elected again president of the Parliament with 270 votes "for" and 26 "abstentions" from the KKE deputies.
Immediately after the election of the Presidium, the Presidential Decree was signed, by which it was decided to dissolve the Parliament of the 19th, to call new parliamentary elections and to convene the new Parliament, and the dates of these were fixed.

== Composition ==
Composition: New Democracy: 146 Syriza: 71 PASOK – Movement for Change: 41 Communist Party of Greece: 26 Greek Solution: 16

=== Members elected and their votes ===
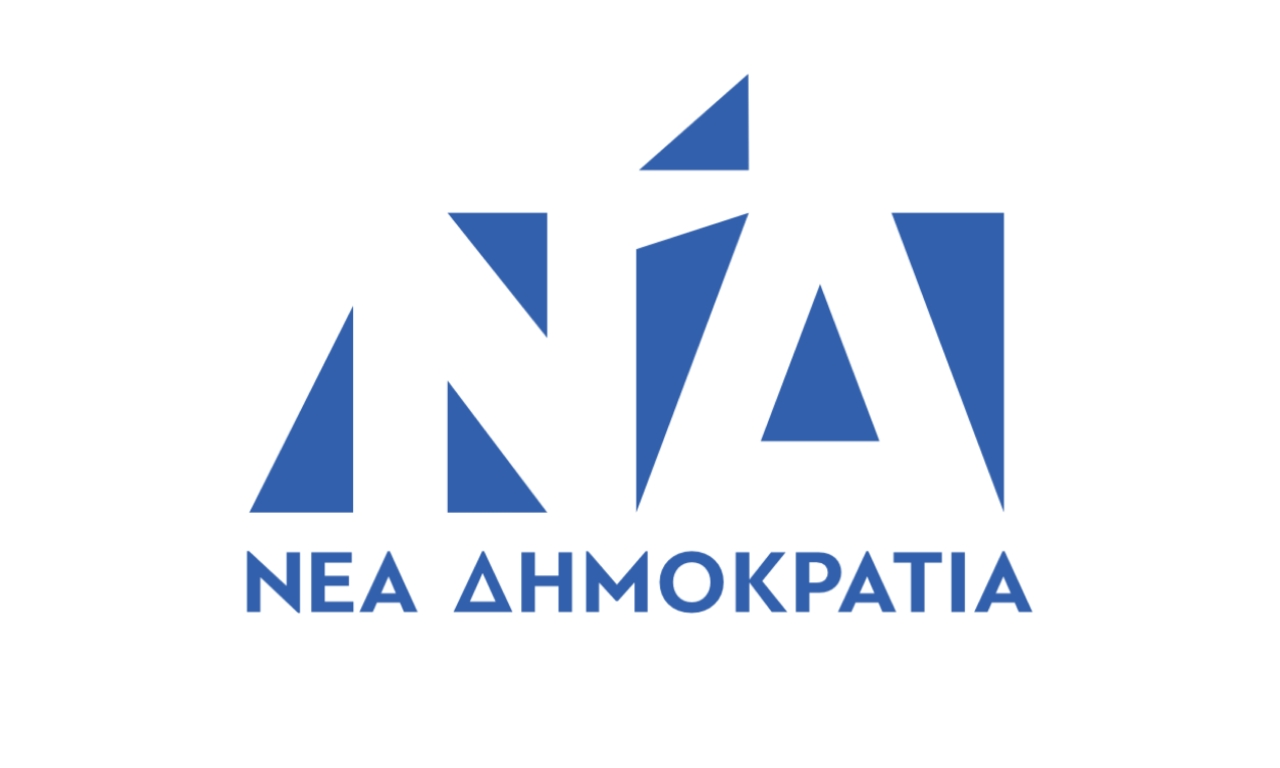
New Democracy (Greece)

==== Nationwide ^{b} ====
▌ Ireni Agapidaki
▌ Theodoros Skylakakis
▌ Christos Stylianides
▌ Ioanna Lytrivi
▌ Giorgos Stamatis
▌ Nefeli Chatziioannidou
▌ Maria Polyzou

==== Athens A ====
▌ Kyriakos Pierrakakis 56.620 votes
▌ Vasilis Kikilias 45.696 votes
▌ Olga Kefalogianni 38.928 votes
▌ Thanos Plevris 33.774 votes
▌ Nikitas Kaklamanis 30.429 votes
▌ Angelos Syrigos 29.866 votes
▌ Fotini Pipili 19.920 votes

==== Athens B1 ====
▌ Kostis Hatzidakis 75.702
▌ Adonis Georgiadis 67.808
▌ Niki Kerameus 61.753
▌ Dimitris Kairidis 50.588
▌ Zoe Rapti 44.972
▌ Theodoros Roussopoulos 34.405
▌ Nikos Papathanasis 27.585
▌ Georgios Koumoutsakos 26.501
▌ Aria Agatsa 14.123

==== Athens B2 ====
▌ Michalis Chrisochoidis 29.215
▌ Miltiadis Varvitsiotis 24.757
▌ Yannis Loverdos 14.139
▌ Maria Syregela 13.924
▌ Dimitrios Kalogeropoulos 12.476

==== Athens B3 ====
▌ Nikos Dendias 99.652
▌ Takis Theodorikakos 47.290
▌ Konstantinos Kyranakis 42.008
▌ Vassilis Spanakis 33.529
▌ Dionysis Hatzidakis 32.083
▌ Haris Theoharis 31.140
▌ Yannis Kallianos 29.500
▌ Anna Karamanli 26.485
▌ Sofia Voultepsi 26.268
▌ Tasos Gaitanis 19.462
▌ Ioanna Gelestathi 14.309

==== Piraeus A ====
▌ Kostas Katsafados 25.305
▌ Domna Michailidou 16.941
▌ Nikos Vlachakos 10.875

==== Piraeus B ====
▌ George Vrettakos 23.824
▌ Michalis Livanos 21.721
▌ Dimitris Markopoulos 20.520

==== East Attica ====
▌ Sofia Zacharaki 54.421
▌ Makis Voridis 44.177
▌ Stelios Petsas 35.735
▌ George Vlachos 22.509
▌ Vassilis Oikonomou 19.388
▌ Vaso Kollia 17.729
▌ Katia Katsandri 9.973

==== West Attica ====
▌ George Kotsiras 15.347
▌ Thanasis Bouras 14.357

==== Aetolia-Acarnania ====
▌ Marios Salmas 19.153
▌ Kostas Karagounis 18.559
▌ Thanasis Papathanasis 17.934

==== Argolis ====
▌ John Andrianos 8.602

==== Arcadia ====
▌ Kostas Vlasis 13.867

==== Arta ====
▌ George Stylios 8.879

==== Achaea ====
▌ Christina Alexopoulou 25.569
▌ Andreas Katsaniotis 21.623
▌ Jason Fotilas 17.861

==== Boeotia ====
▌ Lefteris Ktistakis 6.607

==== Grevena ====
▌ Ioannis Giatsios 3.976

==== Drama ====
▌ Dimitris Kyriazidis 7.378

==== Dodecanese ====
▌ Giannis Pappas 18.813
▌ Manos Konsolas 16.748
▌ Mika Iatridi 14.589

==== Evros ====
▌ Christos Dermentzopoulos 15.929
▌ Stavros Keletsis 12.309

==== Euboea ====
▌ Thanasis Zebilis 18.334
▌ Simos Kedikoglou 15.809

==== Evrytania ====
▌ Tzina Economou 3.239

==== Zakynthos ====
▌ Dionysis Aktypis 6.548

==== Elis ====
▌ Andreas Nikolakopoulos 14.175
▌ Dionysia Avgerinopoulou 13.635
▌ Dimitris Avramopoulos 10.478

==== Imathia ====
▌ Apostolos Vesyropoulos 20.043
▌ Tasos Bartzokas13.139

==== Heraklion ====
▌ Lefteris Avgenakis 26.682
▌ Konstantinos Kefalogiannis 23.396
▌ Maximos Senetakis 21.927

==== Thesprotia ====
▌ Vasileios Giogiakas 9.449

==== Thessaloniki A ====
▌ Kyriakos Mitsotakis 112.971
▌ Stavros Kalafatis 34.551
▌ Konstantinos Gioulekas 32.292
▌ Elena Rapti 30.513
▌ Anna Efthymiou 22.773
▌ Dimitris Kouvelas 15.602
▌ Stratos Simopoulos 15.554
▌ Diamantis Golidakis 15.476
▌ Dimitris Venieris-Velopoulos 13.192

==== Thessaloniki B ====
▌ Dimitris Vartzopoulos 28.377
▌ Theodoros Karaoglou 28.066
▌ Fanis Papas 24.673
▌ Savvas Anastasiadis 24.673

==== Ioannina ====
▌ Konstantinos Tasoulas 18.224
▌ Maria Kefala 14.576

==== Kavala ====
▌ Nikolaos Panagiotopoulos 26.269
▌ Yannis Paschalidis 10.617
▌ Makarios Lazaridis 7.080

==== Karditsa ====
▌ Konstantinos Tsiaras 20.094
▌ Giorgos Kotsos 13.827

==== Kastoria ====
▌ Maria Antoniou (politician) 6.609

==== Corfu ====
▌ Stefanos Gikas 10.750

==== Cephalonia ====
▌ Panagis Kappatos 4.355

==== Kilkis ====
▌ George Georgantas 7.906

==== Kozani ====
▌ Stathis Konstantinidis 12.609

==== Corinthia ====
▌ Christos Dimas 19.036
▌ Nikos Tagaras 11.603

==== Cyclades ====
▌ Giannis Vroutsis 17.898
▌ Katerina Monogyou 13.494
▌ Filippos Fortomas 9.768

==== Laconia ====
▌ Neoclis Kritikos 9.733
▌ Thanasis Davakis 9.563

==== Larissa ====
▌ Christos Kellas 26.831
▌ Christos Kapetanos 25.511
▌ Maximos Charakopoulos 18.954

==== Lasithi ====
▌ Giannis Plakiotakis 12.632

==== Lesbos ====
▌ Charalambos Athanasiou 10.402

==== Lefkada ====
▌ Thanasis Kavvadas 4.106

==== Magnesia ====
▌ Christos Triandopoulos 21.492
▌ Zetta Makri 15.895
▌ Christos Boukoros 15.399

==== Messenia ====
▌ Antonis Samaras 43.518
▌ Miltos Chrysomallis 17.117

==== Xanthi ====
▌ Spyros Tsilingiris 8.584

==== Pella ====
▌ Lakis Vasiliadis 18.678
▌ Dionysis Stamenitis 12.905

==== Pieria ====
▌ Fontas Baraliakos 11.887
▌ Anna Mani Papadimitriou 11.277
▌ Spyros Koulkoudinas 10.438

==== Preveza ====
▌ Spyros Kyriakis 7.589

==== Rethymno ====
▌ Ioannis A. Kefalogiannis 11.364

==== Rhodope ====
▌ Euripides Stylianides 10.895

==== Samos ====
▌ Christodoulos Stefanadis 2.947

==== Serres ====
▌ Kostas Karamanlis 24.651
Tasos Hatzivasileiou 24.389

==== Trikala ====
▌ Kostas Skrekas 18.550

==== Phthiotis ====
▌ Christos Staikouras 25.805

==== Florina ====
▌ Stavros Papasotiriou 5.266

==== Phocis ====
▌Yannis Bougas 4.849

==== Chalkidiki ====
▌ Yiannis Giorgos 6.478

==== Chania ====
▌ Dora Bakoyannis 17.313
▌ Sevi Voloudakis 14.610

==== Chios ====
▌ Notis Mitarachi 7.951

SYRIZA

Nationwide

▌ Othon Iliopoulos
▌ Elena Akrita
▌ Evangelos Apostolakis
▌ Popi Tsapanidou

Athens A

▌ Nasos Iliopoulos 19.988 votes
▌ Dimitris Tzanakopoulos 16.902 votes
▌ Nikos Voutsis 12.421

Athens B1

▌ Athina Linou 25.526
▌ Euclid Tsakalotos 25.498
▌ Mariliza Xenogiannakopoulou 18.001

Athens B2

▌ Effie Achtsioglou 28.491
▌ Rena Dourou 22.433
▌ Giannis Dragasakis 9.347

Athens B3

▌ Nikos Pappas 21.346
▌ Rallia Christidou 17.610
▌ Theano Fotiou 16.174
▌ Ioannis Mouzalas 13.218

Piraeus A

▌ Alexis Tsipras 19.411

Piraeus B

▌ Nina Kasimati 13.123
▌ Giannis Ragousis 10.901

East Attica

▌ Giorgos Karameros 12.828
▌ Christos Spirtzis 12.694

West Attica

▌ Giorgos Tsipras 6.992

Aetolia-Acarnania

▌ Miltos Zambaras 9.921
▌ Grigoris Theodorakis 9.711

Argolis

▌ George Gavrilos 3.602

Arcadia

▌ George Papailiou 3.226

Arta

▌ Olga Gerovasili 7.861

Achaea

▌ Sia Anagnostopoulou 14.727
▌ Andreas Panagiotopoulos 11.940
▌ Giorgos Kyriakopoulos 10.224

Boeotia

▌ Yota Poulou 5.105

Drama

▌ Theofilos Xanthopoulos 3.706

Dodecanese

▌ Chrisoula Karagianni 5.188

Evros

▌ Menelaos Maltezos 6.468

Euboea

▌ Simos Kedikoglou 8.196

Elis

▌ Dionysis Kalamatianos 12.169

Imathia

▌ Angelos Tolkas 4,557

Heraklion

▌ Charis Mamoulakis 13,692
▌ Sokratis Vardakis 13,216

Thessaloniki A

▌ Katerina Notopoulou 17,790
▌ Rania Thraskia 16,847
▌ Christos Giannoulis 12,126
▌ Ioannis Amanatidis 11,362

Thessaloniki B

▌ Sokratis Famellos 13,107
▌ Dora Avgeri 12,738

Ioannina

▌ Meropi Tzoufi 9,787
▌ Giannis Stefos 7,532

Kavala

▌ Sultana Eleftheriadou 6,449

Karditsa

▌ Nikolaos Michalakis 5,809

Corfu

▌ Alexandros Avlonitis 3,961

Kilkis

▌ Petros Pappas 2,743

Kozani

▌ Calliope Vetta 8,068

Corinthia

▌ Giorgos Psychogios 6,854

Cyclades

▌ Nikos Syrmalenios 3,678

Larissa

▌ Vasilis Kokkalis 11,076
▌ Giannis Karipidis 8,736

Lesvos

▌ Yiannis Bournous 3,424

Magnesia

▌ Alexandros Meikopoulos 8,881

Messinia

▌ Alexis Haritsis 10,896

Xanthi

▌ Chousein Zeimpek 7,686

Pella

▌ Theodora Tzakri 11,500

Preveza

▌ Kostas Barkas 3,751

Rodopi

▌ Ozgkiour Ferchat 12,650

Serres

▌ Konstantinos Karpouchtsis 5,543

Trikala

▌ Marina Kontotoli 6,008

Phthiotis

▌ Yannis Sarakiotis 13,509

Florina

▌ Peti Perka 3,544

Chalkidiki

▌ Kyriaki Malama 3,806

Chania

▌ Pavlos Polakis 11,862

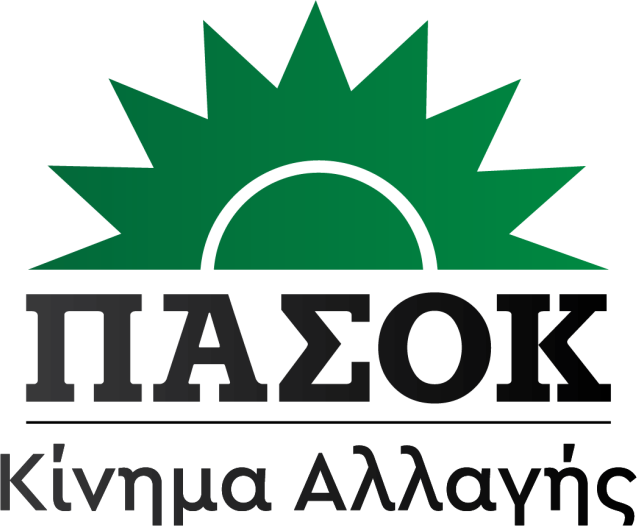
PASOK – Movement for Change

Nationwide

▌ Panagiotis Doudonis
▌ Dimitris Manzos

Athens A

▌ Pavlos Geroulanos 8.274 votes

Athens B1

▌ Milena Apostolaki 11.201 votes

Athens B2

▌ Nadia Giannakopoulou 9.881

Athens B3

▌ Pavlos Christidis 9.930

Piraeus B

▌ Dimitris Diamantidis 4.970

East Attica

▌ Manolis Christodoulakis 7.869

Aetolia-Acarnania

▌ Christina Starakas 8.218

Argolis

▌ Andreas Poulas 4.623

Arcadia

▌ Odysseas Konstantinopoulos 4.731

Achaea

▌ George Papandreou 22.220

Boeotia

▌ George Mulkiotis 3.866

Drama

▌ Tasos Nikolaidis 3.206

Dodecanese

▌George Nikitiadis 5.121

Euboea

▌Katerina Kazani 6.754

Elis

▌ Michalis Katrinis 12.417

Heraklion

▌ Eleni Vacina 12,212
▌ Fragkiskos Parasiris 11,646

Thessaloniki A

▌ Nikos Androulakis 26,270

Thessaloniki B

▌ Thanasis Glavinas 6,392

Ioannina

▌ Giannis Tsimaris 5,014

Karditsa

▌ Sotiris Papageorgiou 7,665

Corfu

▌ Dimitris Biagis 2,951

Kilkis

▌ Stefanos Parastatides 5,101

Kozani

▌ Paris Koukoulopoulos 5,659

Corinthia

▌ Katerina Tagara 4,241

Laconia

▌ Naya Grigoraku 4,688

Larissa

▌ Evangelia Liakoulis 10,197

Lasithi

▌ Katerina Spyridaki 2,753

Lesvos

▌ Panagiotis Paraskevaidis 2,143

Messinia

▌ Panagiotis Adamopoulos 4,189

Xanthi

▌ Mpourchan Mparan 3,922

Pella

▌ Rachil Alexandridou 4,763

Rethymno

▌ Manolis Chnaris 5,393

Rhodope

▌ Ilchan Achmet 6,146

Serres

▌ Michalis Tzelepis 4,869

Trikala

▌ Geogrios Oikonomou 5,989

Phthiotis

▌ Nikolaos Tsonis 5,784

Chalkidiki

▌Apostolos Panas 5,605

Chios

▌ Stavros Michaelidis 2,472

Communist Party of Greece

Nationwide

▌ Thanasis Pafilis

Athens A

▌ Liana Kanelli 11.584 votes

Athens B1

▌ Aphrodite Ctena 9.806 votes
▌ Eri Ritsou 6.021 votes

Athens B2

▌ Vivi Daga 12.231
▌ Geogrios Perros 9.394

Athens B3

▌ Semina Digeni 14.190
▌ Christos Katsotis 12.000

Piraeus A

▌ Nikos Ambatielos 3.226

Piraeus B

▌ Diamanto Manolakou 8.875

Attica A

▌ Giannis Giokas 6.575

Attica B

▌ Christos Tsokanis 2.581

Aetolia-Acarnania

▌ Nikolaos Papanastasis 3.046

Achaea

▌ Nikolaos Karathanasopoulos 5.574

Euboea

▌ George Marinos 3.843

Heraklion

▌ Manolis Syntyhakis 4,615

Thessaloniki A

▌ Giannis Delis 7,419

Thessaloniki B

▌ Leonidas Stoltidis 4,519

Ioannina

▌ Pacos Exarchos 2,620

Kozani

▌ Theodora-Matina Kouziaki 2,569

Larissa

▌ Giorgos Lamproulis 6,272

Magnesia

▌ Vassilis Metaxas 2,208

Messinia

▌ Koutoumanos Nikolaos 2,055

Trikala

▌ Achilleas Kadardzis 2,980

Phthiotis

▌ Dimitris Koutsoumpas 6,342

Chania

▌ Alekos Marinakis 2,051

 Greek Solution

Athens A

▌ Vasilis Grammenos 3.160 votes

Athens B1

▌ Vasilis Villiardos 2.839 votes

Athens B2

▌ Maria Athanasiou 2.307

Athens B3

▌ Agiostratidou Niki 2.713

Piraeus B

▌ Sophia Asimakopoulou 2.588

Attica A

▌ Stelios Fotopoulos 2.883

Achaea

▌ Giannis Lainiotis 1.214

Evros

▌ Paris Papadakis 3.068

Euboea

▌ Armonis Vasileios 1.843

Imathia

▌ Vassilis Kotidis 1,738

Thessaloniki A

▌ Simos Koupeloglou 4,600
▌ Charalambos Panagiotidis 4,303 ^{c}

Thessaloniki B

▌ Kostas Chitas 5,907

Larissa

▌ Kyriakos Velopoulos 6,608

Serres

▌ Kostas Boubas 3,756

== Notes ==
^a The parliamentary terms are numbered in consecutive order from 1975, with Greek numbering.

^b Nationwide MPs are not elected in a specific constituency, but throughout the whole territory of the country. They are chosen by the parties themselves on a first-past-the-post list.

^c Christos Amanatidis, who came second in the vote, did not appear in parliament and was not sworn in. Following the intervention of the party leader, he was replaced by Charalambos Panagiotidis, who came third in the vote.
