= List of members of the Hellenic Parliament, 2009–2012 =

This is a list of the 300 members who were elected to the Hellenic Parliament in the 2009 Greek parliamentary election.

== List of members ==
Name	Party	Constituency	Information
Ariadni Agatsa	PASOK	Boeotia	Left PASOK on 4 April 2012
Christos Aidonis	PASOK	Drama	
Konstantinos Aivaliotis	LAOS	Athens B	
Athanasios Alevras	PASOK	Athens A	
Lítsa Ammanatídou-Paschalídou	SYRIZA	Thessaloniki B	
Christos Aïdonis	PASOK	Pieria	Excluded from PASOK on 12 February 2012; Joined DIMAR on 25 March 2012
Savvas Anastasiadis	New Democracy	Thessaloniki B	
Georgios Anatolakis	LAOS	Piraeus B	
Ioannis Andrianos	New Democracy	Argolis	
Mimis Androulakis	PASOK	Athens B	
Panagiotis Antonakopoulos	PASOK	Elis	
Evangelos Antonaros	New Democracy	National List	
Antonia Antoniou	PASOK	Phthiotis	
Milena Apostolaki	PASOK	Athens B	Left PASOK on 1 November 2011
Savvas Anastasiadis	New Democracy	Laconia	
Vaitsis Apostolatos	LAOS	Piraeus A	
Chrysi Arapoglou	PASOK	Thessaloniki A	
Evangelos Argyris	PASOK	Ioannina	
Georgios Arvanitidis	PASOK	Thessaloniki B	
Panteleimon Aspradakis	PASOK	Attica	
Alexandros Athanasiadis	PASOK	Kozani	Excluded from PASOK on February 12, 2012
Elefthérios Avyenákis	New Democracy	Heraklion	Expelled from New Democracy on November 23, 2010
Dionysia-Theodora Avgerinopoulou	New Democracy	National List	
Dora Bakoyanni	New Democracy	Athens A	Expelled from New Democracy on May 6, 2010
Katerina Batzeli	PASOK	Phthiotis	
Panagiotis Beglitis	PASOK	Corinthia	
Michalis Bekiris	New Democracy	Attica	
Emmanuel Benteniotis	PASOK	Piraeus A	
Markos Bolaris	PASOK	Serres	
Athanasios Bouras	New Democracy	Attica	
Christos Chaidos	PASOK	Trikala	
Michail Chalkidis	New Democracy	Imathia	
Spyros Chalvatzis	KKE	Athens B	
Athanasios Chantavas	PASOK	Grevena	
Maximos Charakopoulos	New Democracy	Larissa	
Georges Charalampopoulos	PASOK	Athens B	
Charalambos Charalambous	KKE	Corfu	
Achmet Chatzi Osman	PASOK	Rhodope	
Evi Christofilopoulou	PASOK	Attica	
Alexandros Chrysanthakopoulos	LAOS	Attica	
Michalis Chrisochoidis	PASOK	Athens B	
Tilemachos Chytiris	PASOK	Athens B	
Anna Dalara	PASOK	Athens B	
Eftychios Damianakis	PASOK	Chania	
Athanasios Davakis	New Democracy	Laconia	
Nikos Dendias	New Democracy	Corfu	
Alexandros Dermentzopoulos	New Democracy	Evros	
Yannis Diamantidis	PASOK	Piraeus B	
Anna Diamantopoulou	PASOK	Athens A	
Yannis Dimaras	PASOK	Athens B	Excluded from PASOK on May 6, 2010
Panagiotis Dimitroulopoulos	PASOK	Elis	Left PASOK on March 19, 2012
Argyris Dinopoulos	New Democracy	Athens B	
Iro Dioti	SYRIZA	Larissa	
Giorgos Dolios	PASOK	Evros	
Theodoros Dritsas	SYRIZA	Piraeus A	
Ioánnis Drivelégas	PASOK	Chalkidiki	
Petros Efthymiou	PASOK	Athens B	
Savvas Eminidis	PASOK	Kavala	
Vasileios Exarchos	PASOK	Larissa	
Aikaterini Farmaki-Gkeki	PASOK	Corinthia	
Georgios Fragidis	PASOK	Kilkis	
Spyridon Galinos	New Democracy	Lesbos	Expelled from New Democracy on February 12, 2012; Joined the Independent Greeks on April 3, 2012
Konstantinos Geitonas	PASOK	Athens B	
Adonis Georgiadis	LAOS	Athens B	Resigned on February 17, 2012, replaced by Manousos Doukakis
Vasileios Geranidis	PASOK	Thessaloniki B	
Pavlos Geroulanos	PASOK	National List	
Sofia Giannaka	PASOK	Aetolia-Acarnania	
Michail Giannakis	New Democracy	Boeotia	Expelled from New Democracy on February 12, 2012; Joined the Independent Greeks on April 3, 2012
Konstantina Giannakopoulou	PASOK	Messenia	
Athanasios Giannopoulos	New Democracy	Phthiotis	
Athanasios Gikonoglou	PASOK	Imathia	
Vasileios Gioumatzidis	PASOK	Pella	
Leonidas Grigorakos	PASOK	Laconia	
Angela Guérékou	PASOK	Corfu	
Ioannis Guiokas	KKE	Attica	
Konstantinos Guioulekas	New Democracy	Thessaloniki A	
Kostis Hadjidakis	New Democracy	Athens B	
Sotirios Hatzigakis	New Democracy	Trikala	Expelled from New Democracy on November 14, 2011
Tsambika Iatridi	New Democracy	Dodecanese	Expelled from New Democracy on February 12, 2012; Joined the Independent Greeks on April 3, 2012
Theodoros Georgiou Ignatiadis	KKE	Thessaloniki B	
Athanasios Ikonomou	PASOK	Ioannina	
Pantelis Ikonomou	PASOK	Athens A	
Vasilis Iconomou	PASOK	Attica	Excluded from PASOK on May 6, 2010; Joined DIMAR on March 26, 2012
Yannis Ioannidis	New Democracy	Thessaloniki A	
Eva Kaili	PASOK	Thessaloniki A	
Apostolos Kaklamanis	PASOK	Athens B	
Stavros Kalafatis	New Democracy	Thessaloniki A	
Sofia Kalantidou	KKE	Thessaloniki A	
Christos Kalapotharakos	LAOS	Attica	
Stavros Kalogiannis	New Democracy	Ioannina	
Panos Kammenos	New Democracy	Athens B	Expelled from New Democracy on November 16, 2011; Joined the Independent Greeks on April 3, 2012
Liana Kanelli	KKE	Athens A	
Nikolaos Kanteres	New Democracy	Attica	
Konstantinos Karagounis	New Democracy	Aetolia-Acarnania	
Kostas Karamanlis	New Democracy	Thessaloniki A	
Ilias Karanikas	PASOK	Evrytania	
Theodoros Karaoglou	New Democracy	Thessaloniki B	
Giorgos Karasmanis	New Democracy	Pella	
Nikolaos Karathanasopoulos	KKE	Attica	
Georgios Karatzaferis	LAOS	Athens B	
Michailis Karchimakis	PASOK	Lasithi	
Anastasios Karipidis	New Democracy	Serres	
Konstantinos Kartalis	PASOK	Magnesia	
Dimitrios Karydis	PASOK	Piraeus A	
Georgios Kasapidis	New Democracy	Kozani	
Ioannis Georgios Kassaras	PASOK	Dodecanese	Excluded from PASOK on February 12, 2012
Haris Kastanidis	PASOK	Thessaloniki A	Excluded from PASOK on February 12, 2012
Michalis Katrinis	PASOK	Elis	
Anna Katsarou	PASOK	Chalkidiki	
Louka Katseli	PASOK	Athens B	Excluded from PASOK on February 12, 2012
Apostolos Katsifaras	PASOK	Attica	Resigned on December 28, 2010. Replaced by Maria Kyriakopoulou, herself expelled from the PASOK group on February 12, 2012.
Christos Katsouras	PASOK	Thesprotia	Excluded from PASOK on February 12, 2012
Konstantinos Kazakos	KKE	National List	
Simos A. Kedikoglou	PASOK	Euboea	
Simos V. Kedikoglou	New Democracy	Euboea	
Hara Kefalidou	PASOK	Drama	
Olga Kefalogianni	New Democracy	Rethymno	
Emmanouil Kefalogiannis	New Democracy	Heraklion	
Vassilis Kegueroglou	PASOK	Heraklion	
Konstantinos Kiltidis	LAOS	Kilkis	
Maria Klavdianou	PASOK	Zakynthos	
Konstantinos Kollias	New Democracy	Corinthia	
María Kóllia-Tsarouchá	New Democracy	Serres	Expelled from New Democracy on February 12, 2012; Joined the Independent Greeks on April 3, 2012
Angelos Kolokotronis	LAOS	Thessaloniki A	
Efstathios Konstantinidis	New Democracy	Florina	
Odysseas Konstantinopoulos	PASOK	Arcadia	
Georgios Kontogiannis	New Democracy	Elis	Left New Democracy on November 24, 2010
Alexandros Kontos	New Democracy	Xanthi	
Ioannis Korantis	LAOS	National List	
Konstandinos Koukodimos	New Democracy	Pieria	
Paraskevas Koukoulopoulos	PASOK	Kozani	
Elena Kountoura	New Democracy	Athens A	Expelled from New Democracy on February 12, 2012; Joined the Independent Greeks on April 3, 2012
Tasos Kourakis	SYRIZA	Thessaloniki A	
Panagiotis Kouroumblis	SYRIZA	Aetolia-Acarnania	
Evagelia Kouroupaki	PASOK	Chania	
Dimitrios Kouselas	PASOK	Messenia	
Efstathios Koutmeridis	PASOK	Serres	
Georgios Kouroumanis	PASOK	Athens B	
Yannis Koutsoukos	PASOK	Elis	
Fotis Kouvelis	SYRIZA	Athens B	Left SYRIZA on June 9, 2010; Joined DIMAR on March 26, 2012
Spyridon Kouvelis	PASOK	Athens A	Excluded from PASOK on February 12, 2012
Dimitris Kremastinos	PASOK	Dodecanese	
Michail Kritsotakis	SYRIZA	Heraklion	
Panagiotis Lafazanis	SYRIZA	Piraeus B	
Giannis Lampropoulos	New Democracy	Messenia	
Theofilos Leontaridis	New Democracy	Serres	
Athanasios Leventis	SYRIZA	Athens B	Left SYRIZA on June 9, 2010; Joined DIMAR on March 26, 2012
Georgios Lianis	PASOK	Florina	Left PASOK on June 14, 2011
Dimitrios Lintzeris	PASOK	Piraeus B	
Andreas Loverdos	PASOK	Athens B	
Andreas Lykourentzos	New Democracy	Arcadia	
Christos Magoufis	PASOK	Trikala	Excluded from PASOK on February 12, 2012
Yannis Mangriotis	PASOK	Thessaloniki A	
Andreas Makrypidis	PASOK	Aetolia-Acarnania	
Giannis Maniatis	PASOK	Argolis	
Angelos Manolakis	PASOK	Corinthia	
Diamanto Manolakou	KKE	Piraeus A	
Tsetin Mantatzi	PASOK	Xanthi	Excluded from PASOK on February 12, 2012
Spyropanos Margelis	PASOK	Lefkada	
Giorgos Marinos	KKE	Euboea	
Pavlos Markakis	LAOS	Magnesia	
Christos Markogiannakis	New Democracy	Chania	Expelled from New Democracy on August 19, 2010
Konstantinos Markopoulos	New Democracy	Euboea	Expelled from New Democracy on February 12, 2012; Joined the Independent Greeks on April 3, 2012
George Mavrikos	KKE	Athens B	
Evangelos Meimarakis	New Democracy	Athens B	
Panagiotis Melas	New Democracy	Piraeus A	Excluded from New Democracy; Joins the Independent Greeks
Athanasia Merentiti	PASOK	Trikala	
Ioannis Micheloyannakis	PASOK	Heraklion	Excluded from PASOK on February 12, 2012; Joined DIMAR on March 26, 2012
Lampros Mihos	PASOK	Athens B	Excluded from PASOK on February 12, 2012
Maria Michou	PASOK	Pieria	
Kyriakos Mitsotakis	New Democracy	Athens B	
Athanasios Moraitis	PASOK	Aetolia-Acarnania	
Nikolaos Moraitis	KKE	Aetolia-Acarnania	
Spyridonas Moschopoulos	PASOK	Cephalonia	
Ilias Mosialos	PASOK	National List	
Vasileios Moulopoulos	SYRIZA	National List	
Konstantinos Mousouroulis	New Democracy	Chios	
Athanasios Nakos	New Democracy	Magnesia	
Apostolos Nanos	KKE	Magnesia	
Ektor Nasiokas	PASOK	Larissa	Resigned on 16 June 2011, replaced by Vasiliki Alexandridou
Anastasios Nerantzis	New Democracy	Piraeus B	
Georgios Nikitiadis	PASOK	Dodecanese	
Varvara Nikolaidou	KKE	Piraeus B	
Nikolaos Nikolopoulos	New Democracy	Attica	
Grigorios Niotis	PASOK	Piraeus B	
Emmanouil Othonas	PASOK	Rethymno	
Athanasios Pafilis	KKE	Athens A	
Nikolaos Panagiotopoulos	New Democracy	Kavala	
Panos Panagiotopoulos	New Democracy	Athens B	
Elena Panaritis	PASOK	National List	
Theodoros Pangalos	PASOK	Attica	
Michail Pantoulas	PASOK	Ioannina	
Vaggelis Papachristos	PASOK	Preveza	Excluded from PASOK on December 14, 2010
Elisavet Papadimitriou	New Democracy	Argolis	Expelled from New Democracy on June 19, 2011
Dimitrios Papadimoulis	SYRIZA	Athens B	
Athanasios Papadopoulos	PASOK	Attica	
Michalis Papadopoulos	New Democracy	Kozani	
Athanasios Papageorgiou	PASOK	Pieria	
Miltiadis Papaioannou	PASOK	Athens B	
Nikolaos Papakonstantinou	KKE	Athens B	
Georgios Papamanolis	PASOK	Cyclades	Excluded from PASOK on February 12, 2012; Joined DIMAR on March 26, 2012
Ourania Papandreou-Papadaki	LAOS	Euboea	
Georgios Papandreou	PASOK	Attica	
Vasso Papandreou	PASOK	Athens B	Excluded from PASOK on February 12, 2012
Aléka Papariga	KKE	Athens B	
Konstantinos Papasiozos	New Democracy	Arta	
Afroditi Papathanasi	PASOK	Phocis	
Yannis Papathanasiou	New Democracy	Athens B	
Christos Papoutsis	PASOK	Athens A	
Dimitrios Papoutsis	PASOK	Kavala	
Theodoros Parastatidis	PASOK	Kilkis	Excluded from PASOK on February 12, 2012
Fragkiskos Parasyris	PASOK	Heraklion	
Prokopis Pavlopoulos	New Democracy	Athens A	
Aikaterini Perlepe-Sifounaki	PASOK	Euboea	
Georgios Petalotis	PASOK	Rhodope	
Philippos Petsalnikos	PASOK	Kastoria	
Fotini Pipili	New Democracy	Athens A	
Ioannis Plakiotakis	New Democracy	Lasithi	
Athanasios Plevris	LAOS	Athens A	
Ilias Polatidis	LAOS	Serres	
Vyron Polydoras	New Democracy	Athens B	
Christos Protopapas	PASOK	Athens B	
Ioannis Protoulis	KKE	Athens B	
Grigoris Psarianos	SYRIZA	Athens B	Left SYRIZA on June 9, 2010; Joined DIMAR on March 26, 2012
Giannis Ragousis	PASOK	National List	
Elena Rapti	New Democracy	Thessaloniki A	
Olga Rentari	PASOK	Evros	
Dimitris Reppas	PASOK	Arcadia	
Panagiotis Rigas	PASOK	Cyclades	
Asterios Rondoulis	LAOS	Larissa	
Konstantinos Rovlias	PASOK	Karditsa	
Filippos Sachinidis	PASOK	Larissa	
Sofia Sakorafa	SYRIZA	Athens B	
Nikolaos Salagiannis	PASOK	Karditsa	
Marios Salmas	New Democracy	Aetolia-Acarnania	
Antonis Samaras	New Democracy	Messenia	
Anastasios Sidiropoulos	PASOK	Imathia	
Nikos Sifounakis	PASOK	Lesbos	
Dimitrios Sioufas	New Democracy	National List	
Kostas Skandalidis	PASOK	Athens A	
Stavros Skopelitis	KKE	Lesbos	
Maria Skrafnaki	PASOK	Heraklion	
Theodoros Skrekas	New Democracy	Trikala	
Antonios Skyllakos	KKE	Larissa	
Konstantinos Spiliopoulos	PASOK	Attica	
Aristovoulos Spiliotopoulos	New Democracy	Athens B	
Christos Staikouras	New Democracy	Phthiotis	
Pavlos Stassinos	PASOK	Arta	Resigned on February 10, 2012, replaced by Christos Gokas
Dimitrios Stamatis	New Democracy	Aetolia-Acarnania	Expelled from New Democracy on February 12, 2012; Joined the Independent Greeks on April 3, 2012
Emmanouil Stratakis	PASOK	Heraklion	
Evripidis Stylianidis	New Democracy	Rhodope	
Spyridon Taliadouros	New Democracy	Karditsa	
Konstantinos Tasoulas	New Democracy	Ioannina	
Kyriakí Tektonidou	PASOK	Thessaloniki A	Excluded from PASOK on February 12, 2012
Maria Theochari	PASOK	Karditsa	
Ilias Theodoridis	PASOK	Pella	Excluded from PASOK on February 12, 2012; Joined DIMAR on March 26, 2012
Michail Timosidis	PASOK	Kavala	
Vasileios Togias	PASOK	Boeotia	Excluded from PASOK on February 12, 2012
Angelos Tolkas	PASOK	Imathia	
Ioannis Tragakis	New Democracy	Piraeus B	
Andreas Triantafyllopoulos	PASOK	Attica	Excluded from PASOK on February 12, 2012
Eleni Tsiaousi	PASOK	Evros	
Konstantinos Tsiaras	New Democracy	Karditsa	
Alexis Tsipras	SYRIZA	Athens A	
Dimitris Tsironis	PASOK	Arta	
Maya Tsoclis	PASOK	National List	Resigned on February 13, 2012, replaced by Tatiana Karapanagioti
Nikolaos Tsonis	PASOK	Phthiotis	
Vasiliki Tsonoglou-Vyllioti	PASOK	Boeotia	
Nikolaos Tsoukalis	SYRIZA	Attica	Left SYRIZA on June 9, 2010; Joined DIMAR on March 26, 2012
Eugenia Tsoumani-Spentza	New Democracy	National List	
Dimitrios Tsoumanis	New Democracy	Preveza	
Athanasios Tsouras	PASOK	Athens A	
Elpida Tsouri	PASOK	Chios	
Theodora Tzakri	PASOK	Pella	
Kostas Tzavaras	New Democracy	Elis	
Michalis Tzelepis	PASOK	Serres	
Zisis Tzikalagias	New Democracy	Kastoria	
Margaritis Tzimas	New Democracy	Drama	
Anna Vagena	PASOK	Athens A	Excluded from PASOK on February 13, 2012
Georgios Vagionas	New Democracy	Chalkidiki	
Ioan Valyrakis	PASOK	Chania	
Pythagoras Vardikos	PASOK	Samos	
Miltiadis Varvitsiotis	New Democracy	Athens B	
Kyriakos Velopoulos	LAOS	Thessaloniki B	
Evangelos Venizelos	PASOK	Thessaloniki A	
Georgios Vlachos	New Democracy	Attica	Expelled from New Democracy on February 12, 2012
Ioannis Vlatis	PASOK	Kozani	
Odyssefs-Nikos Voudouris	PASOK	Messenia	Excluded from PASOK on February 12, 2012; Joined DIMAR on March 26, 2012
Spyridon Vougias	PASOK	Thessaloniki A	
Ioannis Vouros	PASOK	Athens B	
Eliza Vozemberg	New Democracy	Athens A	Expelled from New Democracy on February 12, 2012
Konstantinos Vrettos	PASOK	Attica	
Ioannis Vroutsis	New Democracy	Cyclades	
Mariliza Xenogiannakopoulou	PASOK	Athens B	Excluded from PASOK on February 12, 2012
Sokratis Xynidis	PASOK	Xanthi	
Yerasimos Yakoumatos	New Democracy	Athens B	
Ioannis Ziogas	KKE	Thessaloniki A	
Rodoula Zisi	PASOK	Magnesia	
Nikolaos Zoidis	PASOK	Dodecanese	
Christos Zois	New Democracy	Larissa	Expelled from New Democracy on February 12, 2012; Joined the Independent Greeks on April 3, 2012
