= 1999 European Parliament election in Greece =

- 13 June 1999

25 seats in the European Parliament
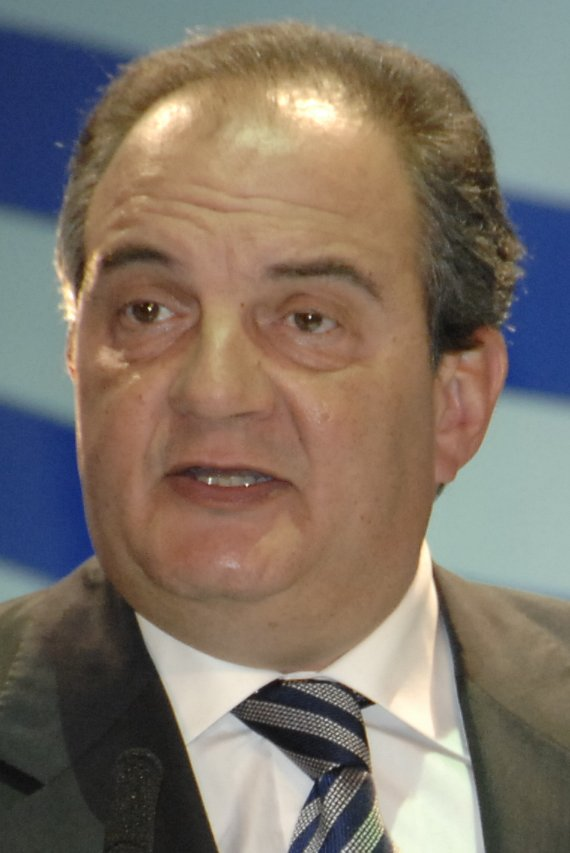

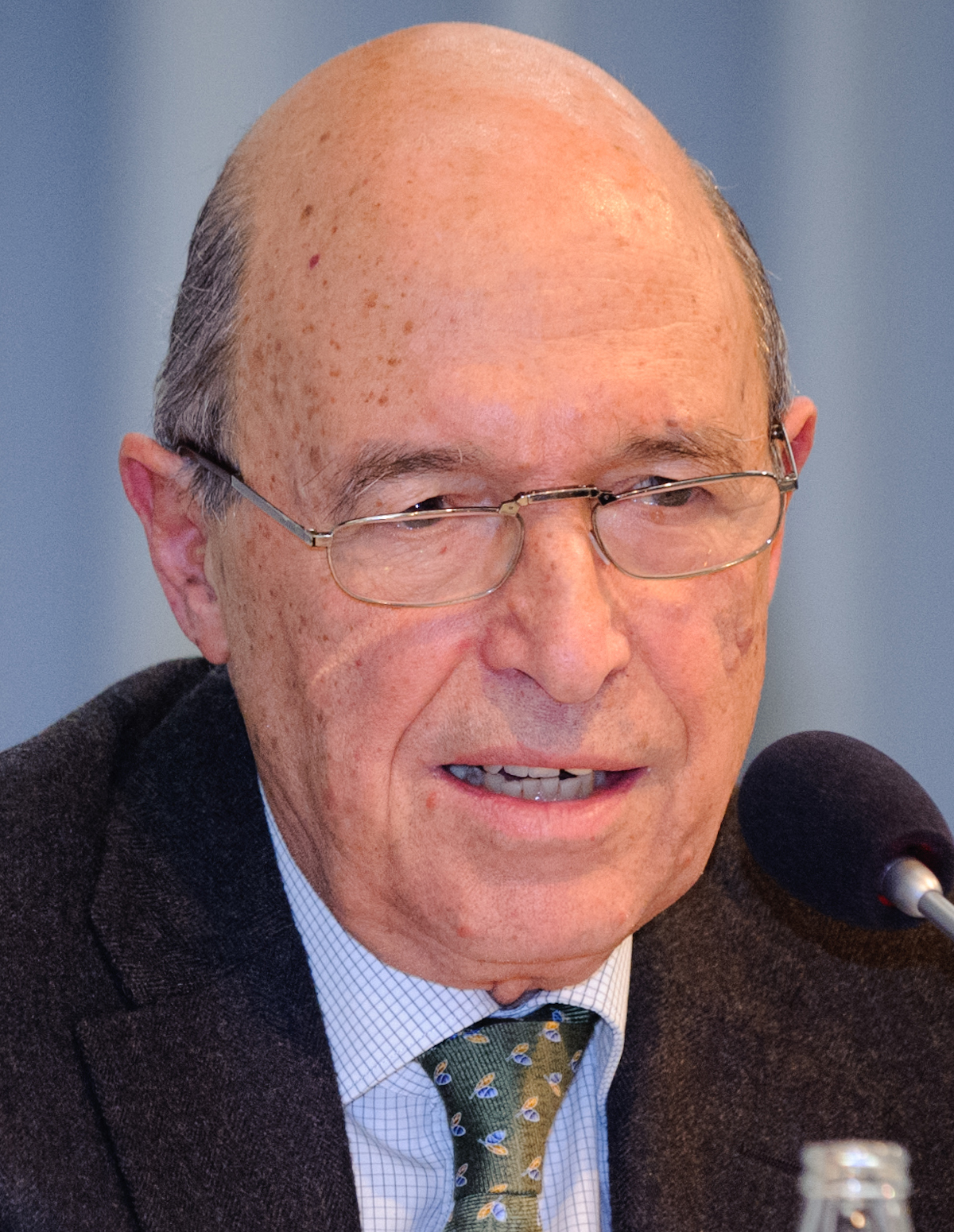

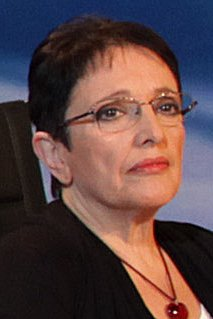

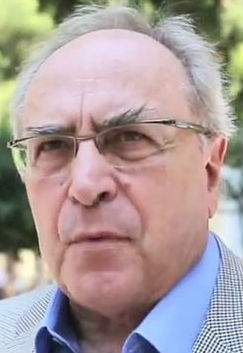
	Majority party	Minority party	Third party
Leader	Kostas Karamanlis	Costas Simitis	Aleka Papariga
Party	ND	PASOK	KKE
Last election	32.66%, 9 seats	37.64%, 10 seats	6.29%, 2 seats
Seats won	9	9	3
Seat change	Steady	▼1	▲1
Popular vote	2,314,371	2,115,844	557,365
Percentage	36.00%	32.91%	8.67%
Swing	▲3.34pp	▼4.73pp	▲2.38pp
	Fourth party	Fifth party
Leader	Dimitris Tsovolas	Nikos Konstantopoulos
Party	DIKKI	Synaspismos
Last election	–	6.25%, 2 seats
Seats won	2	2
Seat change	New	Steady
Popular vote	440,191	331,928
Percentage	6.85%	5.16%
Swing	New	▼1.09pp

European Parliament elections were held in Greece on 13 June 1999 to elect the 25 Greek members to the European Parliament. Members were elected by party-list proportional representation with a 3% threshold for any party.

== Results ==
The 1999 European election was the fifth election to the European Parliament. The opposition conservative New Democracy party made gains as did the Communist Party of Greece, while the ruling PASOK lost ground. Two parties on the left, the relatively new Democratic Social Movement and the Coalition of the Left and Progress elected two MEPs each. Political Spring, which had elected 2 MEPs in 1994, was unsuccessful in passing the 3% threshold and did not elect any members.

Party	Votes	%	Seats	+/–
New Democracy	2,314,371	36.00	9	0
PASOK	2,115,844	32.91	9	–1
Communist Party of Greece	557,365	8.67	3	+1
Democratic Social Movement	440,191	6.85	2	New
Synaspismos	331,928	5.16	2	0
Political Spring	146,512	2.28	0	–2
The Liberals	103,962	1.62	0	New
Party of Greek Hunters	64,194	1.00	0	0
Union of Centrists	52,512	0.82	0	0
Front Line	48,532	0.75	0	New
Kollatos	42,456	0.66	0	0
Greek Ecologists	30,684	0.48	0	0
Radical Anti-Prohibitory Movement	21,274	0.33	0	New
Marxist–Leninist Communist Party of Greece	16,782	0.26	0	0
Party of Hellenism	16,608	0.26	0	New
Alternative Ecologists (Chatzipanagiotou)	14,335	0.22	0	0
Popular Unions of Bipartisan Social Groups	14,266	0.22	0	0
Radical Left Front	10,884	0.17	0	New
Fighting Socialist Party of Greece	9,840	0.15	0	New
Left	9,693	0.15	0	New
Socialist Worker's Party	8,050	0.13	0	New
Hellenic Front	7,693	0.12	0	New
Rainbow	4,951	0.08	0	New
Organization for the Reconstruction of the Communist Party of Greece	4,600	0.07	0	0
Autonomous Revolutionary Political Movement	4,260	0.07	0	0
Olympism	4,152	0.06	0	0
Natural Law Party	2,812	0.04	0	New
Christianity	2,153	0.03	0	New
Human Rights	1,201	0.02	0	New
Alternative Ecologists (Shizas)	832	0.01	0	New
Independents	25,759	0.40	0	0
Total	6,428,696	100.00	25	0
Valid votes	6,428,696	95.77		
Invalid/blank votes	283,988	4.23		
Total votes	6,712,684	100.00		
Registered voters/turnout	9,555,326	70.25		
Source: Ikaria

=== By constituency ===
Constituency	ND	PASOK	KKE	DIKKI	SYN	POLAN	LIB
Constituency	%	%	%	%	%	%	%
Achaea	32.61	36.12	8.41	9.26	4.43	1.97	1.24
Aetolia-Acarnania	39.79	33.58	8.14	7.83	3.13	1.59	1.20
Argolis	42.87	31.86	4.75	6.12	3.82	2.57	1.22
Arcadia	39.59	34.65	5.76	5.79	4.02	2.90	1.53
Arta	42.72	26.51	7.43	12.71	3.89	1.17	0.97
Athens A	32.84	29.81	9.71	5.26	7.77	2.79	3.66
Athens B	28.57	31.79	11.91	6.56	7.78	2.42	2.44
Attica	33.94	30.92	8.72	7.84	5.30	2.08	1.78
Boeotia	36.31	33.44	8.46	8.01	4.64	1.73	1.29
Cephalonia	31.77	29.95	16.37	6.49	5.17	1.33	2.16
Chalkidiki	44.54	32.32	5.56	6.71	3.95	1.53	0.93
Chania	30.12	39.46	8.09	7.71	6.08	1.15	2.14
Chios	35.99	39.13	6.46	4.96	4.88	1.93	1.55
Corfu	34.00	31.15	11.51	7.44	6.32	1.54	2.59
Corinthia	38.82	34.55	4.60	7.86	3.99	2.10	1.62
Cyclades	39.27	32.82	4.60	6.97	5.87	1.98	1.15
Dodecanese	34.47	42.80	4.07	6.35	4.24	1.93	1.47
Drama	45.20	33.96	4.20	6.06	2.98	1.34	1.35
Elis	38.04	35.07	5.28	6.94	5.87	2.22	1.14
Euboea	36.62	34.54	6.85	8.27	4.45	1.76	1.15
Evros	42.88	34.36	4.40	6.53	2.39	2.57	0.84
Evrytania	43.62	36.79	4.00	5.89	2.62	0.91	1.25
Florina	43.82	31.78	4.78	6.17	3.23	1.48	0.91
Grevena	36.88	34.10	9.80	7.74	3.41	2.33	1.02
Heraklion	27.89	48.54	5.57	7.14	5.03	1.09	1.55
Imathia	37.97	32.70	8.37	9.52	3.85	1.73	0.88
Ioannina	37.25	33.27	9.02	7.74	4.76	1.86	1.49
Karditsa	40.66	31.37	10.80	6.51	3.31	2.32	0.86
Kastoria	48.66	31.11	3.68	5.19	3.51	2.52	1.62
Kavala	41.40	32.47	6.77	5.73	3.94	1.90	1.08
Kilkis	42.97	28.50	9.00	5.88	3.58	4.23	0.76
Kozani	41.63	33.24	6.92	7.66	3.92	1.71	0.88
Laconia	49.46	25.85	5.11	6.73	2.96	3.05	1.05
Larissa	36.61	31.89	12.36	6.39	3.93	2.33	1.51
Lasithi	30.44	50.24	3.44	5.75	4.50	0.83	1.19
Lefkada	30.46	30.58	13.31	4.75	5.64	9.66	1.17
Lesbos	31.76	30.48	18.36	7.30	5.08	1.20	0.93
Magnesia	37.22	32.69	10.19	6.09	4.67	1.85	1.19
Messenia	36.60	29.97	6.65	4.53	3.74	12.25	0.97
Pella	41.62	32.36	5.79	8.47	3.14	2.06	0.75
Phocis	42.87	32.54	7.04	5.91	3.18	2.30	1.36
Phthiotis	43.10	33.69	5.82	6.29	3.25	1.40	1.14
Pieria	41.68	32.32	6.87	7.39	3.31	1.84	1.08
Piraeus A	35.29	30.29	8.32	6.35	6.38	2.09	2.03
Piraeus B	26.62	31.94	14.18	7.73	6.97	1.81	1.19
Preveza	40.03	32.82	7.97	7.80	4.38	1.61	1.29
Rethymno	35.02	43.66	4.44	5.61	4.40	1.18	1.90
Rhodope	33.34	35.66	4.10	5.60	7.41	2.26	1.02
Samos	33.27	30.22	17.35	4.63	5.78	1.51	0.98
Serres	47.40	29.46	5.73	6.62	3.06	2.43	0.92
Thesprotia	38.10	36.46	5.02	8.48	4.59	2.28	1.09
Thessaloniki A	34.24	30.27	10.73	6.71	5.87	2.28	1.93
Thessaloniki B	41.50	29.47	8.54	7.63	4.06	1.96	1.11
Trikala	37.30	34.57	10.70	7.58	3.17	1.64	1.05
Xanthi	42.99	30.66	3.76	4.26	4.44	2.60	0.97
Zakynthos	36.88	31.22	13.62	5.42	4.53	1.05	0.82
