= 1985 Greek parliamentary election =

- 2 June 1985

All 300 seats in the Hellenic Parliament 151 seats needed for a majority
- Registered: 8,008,647
- Turnout: 80.19% (▼1.31pp)
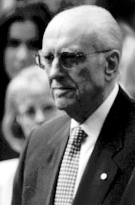

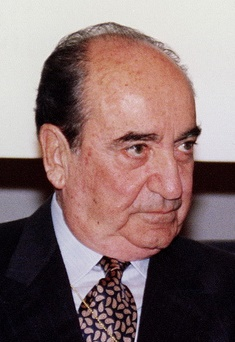

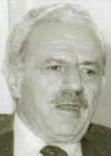

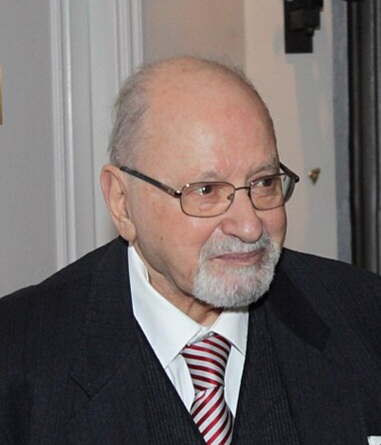
	First party	Second party
Leader	Andreas Papandreou	Konstantinos Mitsotakis
Party	PASOK	ND
Last election	48.07%, 172 seats	35.88%, 115 seats
Seats won	161	126
Seat change	▼11	▲11
Popular vote	2,916,735	2,599,681
Percentage	45.82%	40.84%
Swing	▼2.25pp	▲4.96pp
	Third party	Fourth party
Leader	Charilaos Florakis	Leonidas Kyrkos
Party	KKE	KKE Interior
Last election	10.94%, 13 seats	1.35%, 0 seats
Seats won	12	1
Seat change	▼1	▲1
Popular vote	629,525	117,135
Percentage	9.89%	1.84%
Swing	▼1.05pp	▲0.49pp
Prime Minister before election
Andreas Papandreou
PASOK
Prime Minister after election
Andreas Papandreou
PASOK

Parliamentary elections were held in Greece on 2 June 1985. The governing political party, PASOK of Andreas Papandreou, was re-elected, defeating the liberal conservative New Democracy party of Konstantinos Mitsotakis.

The election campaign was dominated by the ongoing constitutional crisis initiated by Papandreou in March 1985 to advance his preferred candidate, Christos Sartzetakis, for the president of Greece. At the same time, he proposed constitutional revisions to remove the presidential powers that were acting as checks and balances on Papandreou's position. The presidential vote took place amid intense political tension and accusations of constitutional violations, ending with Sartzetakis becoming president. Mitsotakis, as leader of the opposition, denounced the presidential election as illegal and vowed to remove Sartzetakis if his party won, deepening the constitutional crisis.

The confrontation at the presidential election carried over to the parliamentary election campaigns, which polarized Greek society. On one side, Papandreou invoked memories of the Greek Civil War (1946–1949) and Junta (1967–1974), associating New Democracy with the authoritarian Right of the past, while on the other side, Mitsotakis warned the public of Papandreou's totalitarian designs. However, Sartzetakis' election ultimately benefited Papandreou and his party, securing victory in the general elections by consolidating support from the Left, even as they lost ground in the Center amid Greece's worsening economy under his leadership.

After the election, all political parties accepted Sartzetakis as president, ending the constitutional crisis, despite a later court ruling designating the election of Sartzetakis as unconstitutional. The constitutional amendments that came into effect in 1986 substantially strengthened Papandreou's executive authority. However, the monopoly of power and dominance of Papandreou caused strategic reevaluation and alignment in the New Democracy and communist parties, Communist Party of Greece (KKE) and KKE-Interior, leading to Papandreou losing the premiership in 1989.

== Background on the constitutional crisis ==
In 1985, Papandreou provoked a constitutional crisis by denying Konstantinos Karamanlis a second presidential term and supporting Supreme Court justice Christos Sartzetakis instead. His choice sparked further controversy, as it was tied to proposals of constitutional reforms aimed at increasing the power of his position by weakening the presidential powers, which had served as checks and balances on the executive branch led by the prime minister. The election of the new president took place in March 1985 under a tense and confrontational atmosphere due to Papandreou's dubious constitutional procedures. The leader of the opposition, Konstantinos Mitsotakis, denounced the vote as illegal and vowed that if New Democracy won the elections, Sartzetakis would not be president by bringing the legality of the process to the Council of State (Greek: Συμβούλιο Επικρατείας), further deepening the constitutional crisis.

Scholars argued that the crisis was motivated by Papandreou's desire to divert the Greek electorate's attention away from the worsening state of the Greek economy (unemployment increased under PASOK from 2.7% in 1980 to 7.8% in 1985, annual inflation of the order of 20%, and widening trade deficits). According to a public opinion survey by Eurobarometer, the number of Greeks who believed that the economic situation worsened increased from 37.7% in 1983 to 70.2% in 1985, while those who believed that it improved fell from 31.5% to 12.8% in the same period.

== Election campaigns ==
The logo of PASOK in the elections of 1981

Both parties continued their confrontations over the constitutional crisis in their election campaigns, where the political polarization reached new heights. Mitsotakis declared, "In voting, the Greek people will also be voting for a president" and also warned that there is a danger of sliding towards an authoritarian one-party state. The president's office responded, "The president of the republic will remain the vigilant guardian of the constitution." From PASOK, Agamemnon Koutsogiorgas described what was at stake not as "oranges and tomatoes but the confrontation between two worlds." Papandreou followed this by characterizing the upcoming elections as a fight between light and darkness in his rallies, implying that PASOK represented the "forces of light" since its logo was a rising sun. Papandreou further argued that every vote against PASOK was a vote for the return of the Right, associating the Right of the mid-1980s with the authoritarian and pro-monarchy elements of the Right in the pre-1974 era, with the slogan "Vote PASOK to prevent a return of the Right." The communists, persecuted by the Right in the 1950s, protested against Papandreou's dwelling on the past, pointing out that the 1980s were not the same as the 1950s. The Economist magazine described Greece as a "country divided," tearing itself apart and opening the wounds of the Greek Civil War.

Two days before the 2 June elections, Karamanlis broke his silence and urged Greeks to be cautious in their voting (without explicitly advising whom to vote for), commenting that PASOK had brought "confusion and uncertainty." However, Karamanlis' statement was not broadcast on TV and radio, which were controlled by the governing party, i.e., PASOK.

== Electoral system ==
Since the establishment of the Third Hellenic Republic, Greece conducted parliamentary elections under successive iterations of a system known as "reinforced proportional representation", which was engineered to produce stable single-party majorities in the 300-seat Hellenic Parliament. The framework distributed parliamentary seats through a multi-tiered mechanism involving primary constituency rounds and subsequent distributions. In the initial round, seats were assigned locally using an electoral quota, leaving unallocated residual seats. Access to these remaining seats in higher-tier distributions was restricted to political parties that exceeded national vote thresholds, disproportionately reallocating unassigned seats to the leading party. This multi-step mechanism was modified in February 1985 ahead of the 1985 elections through Law 1516/1985. The law, while it removed the vote thresholds, recalibrated the distribution of seats to favor the leading party at the expense of the second and provide a minor boost to third parties.

== Results ==
In the event, PASOK was re-elected with 45.82% of the vote, losing approximately 2.3% from 1981, while New Democracy increased its share of the vote by 4.98% to 40.84%. Papandreou's gamble worked to his benefit because he gained from far-left voting blocs covering the losses from the centrist voters, and appealed to socialist voters who rejected Karamanlis' perceived hindrance of PASOK's policies.

Papandreou had the upper hand over Mitsotakis because he argued that a vote for Mitsotakis was a vote for a constitutional anomaly, convincing a significant fraction of Greek voters. Historian Richard Clogg argued that the large-scale rally by Mitsotakis on the Thursday prior to the 2 June election at Syntagma Square may have panicked communists into voting for PASOK; the communist parties lost a significant share of the vote.

Party	Votes	%	Seats	+/–
PASOK	2,916,735	45.82	161	–11
New Democracy	2,599,681	40.84	126	+11
Communist Party of Greece	629,525	9.89	12	–1
Communist Party of Greece (Interior)	117,135	1.84	1	+1
National Political Union	37,965	0.60	0	New
Liberal Party	10,551	0.17	0	0
Fighting Socialist Party of Greece	10,369	0.16	0	New
Revolutionary Communist Movement	6,951	0.11	0	0
Communist Left	5,383	0.08	0	New
Eleftheroi	5,212	0.08	0	New
International Workers' Union – Trotskyists	3,685	0.06	0	0
Hellenic Christian Social Union	251	0.00	0	New
Patriotic Right	172	0.00	0	New
Olympic Democracy	162	0.00	0	0
Enlighten Movement	49	0.00	0	New
Greens–Ecological Party–Hellenic Alternative Green Movement	5	0.00	0	New
Independents	21,263	0.33	0	0
Total	6,365,094	100.00	300	0
Valid votes	6,365,094	99.11		
Invalid/blank votes	57,372	0.89		
Total votes	6,422,466	100.00		
Registered voters/turnout	8,008,647	80.19		
Source: Ministry of the Interior, Nohlen & Stöver

=== Results by constituency ===
The parliamentary results by constituency are presented in the table below.

Constituency	PASOK		ND		KKE		KKE-IN	
Constituency	%	±	%	±	%	±	%	±
Achaea	52.53	▼3.39	36.14	▲5.52	8.84	▼0.35	1.42	▲0.38
Aetolia-Akarnania	46.27	▼2.06	41.67	▲1.77	9.90	▲0.59	1.11	▲0.46
Argolis	43.50	▼1.03	48.86	▲2.03	5.12	▼0.17	1.05	▲0.36
Arkadia	44.85	▼0.06	45.13	▲2.23	7.37	▼0.08	1.28	▲0.51
Arta	41.82	▼0.59	45.93	▼0.59	9.91	▲0.65	1.26	▲0.50
Athens A	39.76	▼4.68	44.05	▲9.63	10.64	▼1.99	4.37	▲1.11
Athens B	44.99	▼3.74	34.79	▲8.43	15.51	▼2.53	3.56	▲0.81
Attica	43.54	▼6.04	44.10	▲9.25	9.66	▼1.07	1.49	▲0.62
Boeotia	47.60	▼5.26	40.01	▲4.96	9.26	▲0.10	1.71	▲0.64
Kephalonia	44.07	▲1.51	37.33	▲4.37	15.63	▼1.69	1.74	▲0.53
Chalkidiki	44.70	▼1.27	47.82	▲1.97	5.45	▼0.05	1.01	▲0.20
Chania	54.96	▼0.30	31.16	▲6.05	10.44	▼1.52	1.29	▲0.49
Chios	52.33	▲3.36	39.09	▼3.59	5.91	▼0.27	1.65	▲0.64
Corfu	51.05	▲0.27	34.66	▲0.62	11.15	▼0.47	1.97	▲0.52
Corinthia	47.34	▼3.57	45.50	▲5.19	4.34	▼0.27	1.40	▲0.64
Cyclades	48.12	▲1.10	45.39	▼0.36	4.31	▼0.25	1.14	▲0.47
Dodecanese	56.67	▼1.52	36.10	▲5.81	5.08	▲0.19	1.12	▲0.32
Drama	47.69	▼0.78	46.31	▲2.57	3.71	▼0.80	0.99	▲0.25
Elis	50.22	▼1.98	41.61	▲1.17	5.99	▲0.28	1.03	▲0.51
Euboea	50.31	▼4.74	40.19	▲8.12	7.29	▼0.21	1.07	▲0.44
Evros	44.56	▼1.26	47.67	▲6.82	5.39	▲0.01	0.94	▲0.21
Evrytania	49.88	▼3.28	43.23	▲2.00	5.08	▲0.85	0.83	▲0.47
Florina	42.79	▲3.28	47.72	▼0.97	6.88	▲0.25	0.90	▲0.27
Grevena	46.55	▼1.37	39.17	▲5.00	11.56	▼0.75	1.26	▲0.30
Heraklion	64.32	▼1.58	26.02	▲6.82	7.38	▼1.08	1.19	▲0.35
Imathia	47.82	▼2.41	40.51	▲4.45	9.13	▼1.08	1.28	▲0.44
Ioannina	44.60	▼1.21	38.25	▼1.63	13.92	▲2.24	1.67	▲0.54
Karditsa	44.20	▲0.35	40.89	▼0.08	12.22	▲0.08	1.18	▲0.43
Kastoria	38.95	▼0.83	53.81	▲1.45	4.31	▲0.13	0.99	▲0.36
Kavala	47.45	▼1.13	42.79	▲3.93	7.30	▼1.51	1.17	▲0.13
Kilkis	41.90	▲1.24	46.37	▲4.52	9.23	▼1.98	0.98	▲0.10
Kozani	45.65	▲0.56	44.28	▲0.17	7.72	▲0.26	1.24	▲0.42
Laconia	34.87	▲0.55	56.92	▲3.12	5.46	▼0.04	1.02	▲0.44
Larissa	44.00	▼1.06	39.21	▲3.01	14.15	▼1.15	1.42	▲0.40
Lasithi	61.59	▼1.65	31.14	▲1.89	5.93	▲0.19	0.65	▲0.23
Lefkada	41.15	▲1.29	35.53	▼2.06	19.06	▲0.02	3.06	▲0.84
Lesbos	44.48	▲4.58	30.23	▼1.16	22.58	▼3.46	1.62	▲0.19
Magnesia	45.41	▼0.98	39.02	▲3.75	12.96	▼1.52	1.39	▲0.16
Messenia	40.86	▼1.25	48.70	▲2.90	7.83	▼0.37	1.12	▲0.51
Pella	49.13	▼1.56	43.08	▲3.66	5.49	▼0.61	0.93	▲0.31
Phocis	42.41	▼3.89	48.11	▲4.88	6.73	▲0.19	1.23	▲0.59
Phthiotis	45.45	▼2.89	45.06	▲5.17	6.90	▼0.54	1.26	▲0.50
Pieria	46.22	▼1.84	44.73	▲3.94	6.62	▼1.09	0.99	▲0.21
Piraeus A	44.08	▼4.09	42.54	▲8.37	9.55	▼2.65	2.66	▲0.74
Piraeus B	49.33	▼1.83	29.70	▲6.61	17.13	▼4.15	2.64	▲0.55
Preveza	42.96	▼3.22	42.73	▲1.60	11.60	▲1.30	1.22	▲0.31
Rethymno	57.20	▲6.05	34.33	▲9.66	6.03	▲0.45	0.97	▲0.38
Rhodope	30.42	▼20.41	49.92	▲10.06	2.90	▼1.21	0.65	▲0.13
Samos	40.99	▲7.20	36.20	▼5.01	19.30	▼1.82	2.48	▼0.02
Serres	43.04	▼2.26	47.75	▲3.70	6.68	▼0.86	1.03	▲0.31
Thesprotia	49.37	▼6.31	39.11	▲4.35	8.61	▲1.34	1.58	▲0.67
Thessaloniki A	44.67	▼2.96	41.21	▲8.39	10.31	▼2.79	2.66	▲0.58
Thessaloniki B	44.47	▼2.28	44.14	▲5.58	9.14	▼1.39	1.06	▲0.23
Trikala	45.31	▼2.71	38.31	▲3.27	13.61	▼0.12	1.04	▲0.19
Xanthi	32.22	▼2.62	45.97	▲9.15	2.35	▼0.43	0.85	▲0.12
Zakynthos	43.84	▲0.72	38.80	▲1.71	14.97	▼0.86	1.58	▲0.18
Source: Ministry of the Interior

== Aftermath ==
After the election results, Mitsotakis accepted Sartzetakis as president and the head of state. However, the Athens One-Member Magistrates' Court ruled that the President's election had been "irregular" and "amounted to an abrogation of popular sovereignty". (Note: "[...] κατάργηση στη συγκεκριμένη περίπτωση του Εκλογικού Σώματος ως οργάνου εξουσίας και κατάλυση στην πράξη της αρχής της λαϊκής κυριαρχίας.") The court further held that the subsequent political legitimacy conferred by PASOK's victory in the 1985 election did not negate the unconstitutional nature of the original act. (Note: "[...] ανεξάρτητα του ζητήματος της θεμελίωσης της νομιμοποιήσεως της εξουσίας του Προέδρου της Δημοκρατίας στη κανονιστική δύναμη των πραγμάτων που ρύθμισαν οι εκλογές και της αναγνωρίσεως του αποτελέσματος της ρυθμίσεως".) Constitutional scholar Christos Papastylianos called the latter an example that displays the limits of judicial jurisdiction in Greece; the courts can deem an action as unconstitutional but are unable to prevent it. Papandreou's constitutional proposals took effect in 1986.

=== PASOK government and austerity ===
After the election victory, Papandreou's government applied to the EEC for a $1.75 billion loan to deal with the widening foreign trade deficit (8.7% of GDP). However, the EEC imposed austerity measures as a precondition for the loan. The stabilization package was implemented by Costas Simitis as Minister of Finance. Papandreou touted the loan as a lifeline for the economy of Greece because if they had not, then the International Monetary Fund (IMF) would have imposed more severe austerity measures. Simitis' policies had the intended outcome, with the inflation reduced from 23% in 1986 to 13.5% in 1988, and the Public Sector Borrowing Requirement fell from approximately 18% of GDP in 1985 to 13% of GDP in 1987. However, Papandreou was shaken by a widespread backlash, with long-running strikes and demonstrations by farmers and major unions in early 1987. With the 1989 elections approaching, Papandreou forced Simitis to resign from his ministerial position in November 1987, and the reforms were abandoned, returning to populist policies. Greece started to fall behind in terms of convergence with EEC goals, economic competitiveness, dependence on EEC and state subsidies, investment, inflation, and growth.

=== New Democracy leadership speculations and fracture ===
Despite New Democracy's increased share of the vote, PASOK's 5% lead, combined with concerns over the party’s two consecutive electoral defeats (in 1981 under Georgios Rallis and in 1985 under Mitsotakis), sparked doubts among New Democracy's old guard about Mitsotakis's future as party leader. Facing internal dissent, Mitsotakis resigned in 1985 but later stood unopposed for re-election at the party congress, winning the backing of 82 of New Democracy's 126 deputies, 11 more than in 1984. His former rival for the leadership, Konstantinos Stephanopoulos, abstained from the vote and subsequently left New Democracy to establish a new political party, Democratic Renewal, taking nine MPs with him. Stephanopoulos criticized the ND leadership for its weak campaign performance in 1985 and for appearing to prioritize the interests of employers over those of workers.

=== Unholy alliance ===
Papandreou's electoral dominance frustrated the communist parties, which suffered a decline in their share of the vote. According to political scientist Vasilis Kapetanyannis, there was growing resentment towards PASOK for its authoritarian practices and monopoly of power, while at the same time, it utilized the Left's ideology and voting power. In the local elections of October 1986, KKE party chose not to support candidates of PASOK in the three major municipalities (Athens, Piraeus, and Thessaloniki), which provided an opportunity for ND to obtain a new power basis to challenge PASOK. This alignment was both novel and unexpected within Greek society, given not only the parties' conflicting ideologies but also their positions on opposing sides of the Civil War. PASOK described this unannounced collaboration as "unholy alliance."

The alignment between conservatives and communists against Papandreou strengthened as a series of growing corruption scandals, most notably the Koskotas and the Yugoslav corn affairs, began to engulf Papandreou's second administration. These scandals ultimately culminated in the "katharsis" after the June 1989 elections, when the two groups formed a coalition government with a limited mandate to investigate PASOK's corruption, which led to the indictment of Papandreou over the Koskotas scandal.

== Sources ==
Constitutions of Greece

- "Greek Constitution of 1986". Government Gazette (Greece) ΦΕΚ A 23/1986 (in Greek). National Printing Office.

Court decisions

- 84464/1985 Αρχείον Νομολογίας (Magistrate's Court (Μονομελούς Πλημμελειοδικείου Αθηνών) 1985).

Books

- Carabott, Philip; Sfikas, Thanassis D., eds. (2004). The Greek Civil War: Essays on a Conflict of Exceptionalism and Silences. Surrey: Ashgate. ISBN 9780754641322.
  - Close, David. "The Road to Reconciliation". In Carabott & Sfikas (2004), pp. 257–278.
- Clogg, Richard (1987). Parties and Elections in Greece: The Search for Legitimacy. North Carolina: Duke University Press. ISBN 0822307944.
- ——————, ed. (1993). Greece, 1981–89: The Populist Decade. London & New York: Palgrave Macmillan. ISBN 9781349230563.
  - Kapetanyannis, Vasilis. "The Left in the 1980s: Too Little, Too Late". In Clogg (1993), pp. 65–93.
- Clogg, Richard (2013). A Concise History of Greece. Cambridge: Cambridge University Press. ISBN 9781107656444.
- Close, David H. (2014). Greece since 1945: Politics, Economy and Society. London & New York: Taylor & Francis. ISBN 978-1-317-88001-1.
- Featherstone, Kevin; Katsoudas, Dimitrios K., eds. (1987). Political Change in Greece: Before and After the Colonels. London & New York: Taylor & Francis. ISBN 9781000992144.
  - Katsoudas, Dimitrios K. "The Constitutional Framework". In Featherstone & Katsoudas (1987), pp. 14–33.
  - Featherstone, Kevin. "Elections and Voting Behavior". In Featherstone & Katsoudas (1987), pp. 34–63.
- ——————; Papadimitriou, Dimitris (2015). Prime Ministers in Greece, The Paradox of Power. Oxford: Oxford University Press. ISBN 9780198717171.
- Jouganatos, George A. (1992). The Development of the Greek Economy, 1950-1991, An Historical, Empirical, and Econometric Analysis. Westport & London: Greenwood Press. ISBN 9780313283444.
- Koliopoulos, John S.; Veremis, Thanos M. [in Greek] (2009). Modern Greece a History since 1821. Oxford: Wiley-Blackwell. ISBN 9781444314830.
- Liakos, Antonis [in Greek]; Doumanis, Nicholas (2023). The Edinburgh History of the Greeks, 20th and Early 21st Centuries: Global Perspectives. Edinburgh: Edinburgh University Press. ISBN 978-1-4744-1084-7.
- Nohlen, Dieter; Stöver, Philip, eds. (2010). Elections in Europe: A data Handbook. Baden-Baden: Nomos. ISBN 978-3-8329-5609-7.
- Pappas, Takis (2014). Populism and Crisis Politics in Greece (in Greek). New York: Palgrave Macmillan. ISBN 9781137410580.
- Pridham, Geoffrey, ed. (2012). Securing Democracy. London & New York: Taylor & Francis. ISBN 9781134975419.
  - Featherstone, Kevin. "Political Parties and Democratic Consolidation in Greece". In Pridham (2012), pp. 179-202.
- Siani-Davies, Peter (2017). Crisis in Greece. Oxford: Oxford University Press. ISBN 9780190911539.

Journal

- Clogg, Richard (1985). "The 1985 Constitutional Crisis in Greece". The Journal of Modern Hellenism. 2 (1): 103–112. ISSN 0743-7749.
- Dimitras, Panayote Elias (1985). "The Greek Parliamentary Election of 1985". Electoral Studies. 4 (3): 261–265. doi:10.1016/0261-3794(85)90019-8. ISSN 0261-3794.
- Featherstone, Kevin (1990b). "The 'Party‐State' in Greece and the Fall of Papandreou". West European Politics. 13 (1): 101–115. doi:10.1080/01402389008424782.
- Kalyvas, Stathis N. (1997). "Polarization in Greek Politics: PASOK's First Four Years, 1981-1985". Journal of the Hellenic Diaspora. 23 (1): 83–104.
- Matsaganis, Manos (1999). "Welfare Policies in Greece since the Early 1980s" (PDF). Oficina do CES. 149: 1–23.
- McDonald, Robert (1985). "Greece after PASOK's Victory". The World Today. 41 (7): 133–136. JSTOR 40395748.

Web and other sources

- Papastylianos, Christos (2023), Σύνταγμα, Ερμηνεία κατ' Άρθρο, Άρθρο 120 [Constitution, Interpretation per Article, Article 120] (in Greek)
- "Greece's Unemployment (%)". International Monetary Fund.
- "Greece's Inflation Rate (%)". International Monetary Fund.
- "Αποτελέσματα των Βουλευτικών Εκλογών της 2ας Ιουλίου" (PDF). Ministry of the Interior. Archived from the original (PDF) on 2 June 2021.
