= List of members of the Hellenic Parliament, 2023 =

List of members of the Hellenic Parliament, 2023 may refer to:

- List of members of the Hellenic Parliament, May 2023
- List of members of the Hellenic Parliament, June 2023
