= Dimitris Tsironis (politician) =

Greek politician (1960–2022)

Dimitris Tsironis MP
- Δημήτρης Τσιρώνης

Member of the Hellenic Parliament for Arta
- In office 16 September 2007 – 6 May 2012

Personal details
- Born: 1960 Arta, Greece
- Died: 9 August 2022 (aged 62)
- Party: PASOK
- Spouse: Alexia Kaklamanou
- Children: 2
- Education: Athens University of Economics and Business; National Centre for Public Administration and Local Government

Dimitris Tsironis (Greek: Δημήτρης Τσιρώνης; 1960 – 9 August 2022) was a Greek politician who served in the Hellenic Parliament from 2007 to 2012 as a member of the Pan-Hellenic Socialist Movement.

== Biography ==
Tsironis was born in 1960 in the northwestern city of Arta. He studied economics at the Supreme School of Economics and Business in Athens, and received a postgraduate degree in local government and regional development at the National School of Public Administration.

In the 2007 Greek legislative election, Tsironis was elected to the Hellenic Parliament, representing Arta as a member of the Pan-Hellenic Socialist Movement (PASOK). He was re-elected in 2009. Tsironis did not run for re-election in the May 2012 Greek legislative election.

While in parliament, Tsironis served as the chairman of the Committee on Production and Trade, and was a member of the Committee on Regions. Tsironis also served in several positions within his party, including as the director of the Secretariat of the PASOK Parliamentary Group and was a member of the PASOK National Reconstruction Council.

During his career, Tsironis wrote two books on statistics. He was married to Alexia Kaklamanou and had two children. Tsironis died of cancer on 9 August 2022 at the age of 62. Following his death, PASOK released a statement describing Tsironis as having been "at the vanguard of the struggle for social justice".
