= List of parliamentary constituencies of Greece =

Parliamentary constituencies as of the 2018 reform.

Parliamentary constituencies as of 2018 by number of seats.

The Greece constituency for elections to the European Parliament.

This is a list of electoral constituencies returning Members of Parliament to the Parliament of Greece. The list reflects the changes which were made to Athens B and Attica in December 2018. Electoral constituencies account for 285 of the 300 parliamentary seats, while the other 15 are elected on a national level through party-list proportional representation. Each constituency, with the exception of those in Attica and Thessaloniki, corresponds to a single prefecture of Greece, even though these were abolished in 2010.

The number of seats in each constituency is calculated by first finding the national quota. This is done by dividing the total number of legal residents in the country, as counted at the latest census, by 285 – the number of seats in the Parliament elected in constituencies; using the 2021 census, the current quota is 34,089 residents per seat. The actual number of seats per constituency is then calculated in two steps. First by dividing the legal resident population of each constituency with the national quota and rounding down, so that Athens A for example gets 13 seats with a sum of 13.59 while Evrytania gets 0 with a sum of 0.90. Because the sums are rounded down, there are always leftover seats which are then allocated in the second step, by awarding one additional seat to each constituency, in descending order of leftover sums, until all 285 constituency seats have been allocated. In the 2022 apportionment of seats, 256 seats were allocated in the first step and 29 in the second.

In addition, Greece is a single 21-seat constituency of the European Parliament.

Constituencies of Greece
Constituency	Legal residents (2021 census)	Seats	Maximum number of votes per ballot	Legal residents per seat	Precincts
Achaea	296,574	9	3	32,953	266
Aetolia-Acarnania	235,371	7	2	33,624	275
Arcadia	96,092	3	1	32,031	258
Argolis	93,934	3	1	31,311	93
Arta	79,776	2	1	39,888	114
Athens A	430,362	13	4	33,105	58
Athens B1 – North Athens	557,407	16	4	34,838	61
Athens B2 – West Athens	405,623	12	4	33,802	39
Athens B3 – South Athens	636,474	19	4	33,499	69
Boeotia	109,293	3	1	36,431	80
Cephalonia	41,069	1	1	41,069	80
Chalkidiki	104,702	3	1	34,901	76
Chania	144,259	4	2	36,064	170
Chios	52,096	2	1	26,048	62
Corfu	97,037	3	1	32,346	124
Corinthia	136,401	4	2	34,100	126
Cyclades	122,738	4	2	30,685	120
Dodecanese	180,591	5	2	36,118	91
Drama	95,701	3	1	31,900	86
East Attica	403,714	12	3	33,643	57
Elis	168,358	5	2	33,672	237
Euboea	213,179	6	2	35,530	194
Evros	134,776	4	2	33,694	151
Evrytania	24,545	1	1	24,545	106
Florina	50,921	2	1	25,460	93
Grevena	34,538	1	1	34,538	92
Heraklion	285,528	8	3	35,691	217
Imathia	136,602	4	2	34,150	86
Ioannina	163,044	5	2	32,609	335
Karditsa	129,171	4	2	32,293	158
Kastoria	48,464	1	1	48,464	74
Kavala	129,872	4	2	32,468	90
Kilkis	85,885	3	1	28,628	112
Kozani	149,733	4	2	37,433	172
Laconia	87,104	3	1	29,035	168
Larissa	268,451	8	3	33,556	189
Lasithi	73,258	2	1	36,629	95
Lefkada	25,365	1	1	25,365	48
Lesbos	97,824	3	1	32,608	107
Magnesia	181,879	5	2	36,376	97
Messenia	161,953	5	2	32,391	290
Pella	138,568	4	2	34,642	115
Phocis	39,800	1	1	39,800	94
Phthiotis	151,036	4	2	37,759	201
Pieria	123,245	4	2	30,811	67
Piraeus A	182,667	5	2	36,533	63
Piraeus B	274,730	8	3	34,342	31
Preveza	62,769	2	1	31,385	85
Rethymno	79,801	2	1	39,901	146
Rhodope	101,767	3	1	33,922	137
Samos	42,202	1	1	42,202	50
Serres	182,226	5	2	36,445	173
Thesprotia	47,947	1	1	47,947	114
Thessaloniki A	568,576	17	4	33,446	66
Thessaloniki B	316,369	9	3	35,152	121
Trikala	139,562	4	2	34,891	181
West Attica	148,548	4	2	37,137	17
Xanthi	107,548	3	1	35,849	83
Zakynthos	38,340	1	1	38,340	47
Average	164,667	5	2	34,493	122
Greece total	9,715,375	285^{a}	–	34,385	7,207

== See also ==
- Apportionment in the Hellenic Parliament

== Notes ==
1. ^a A further 15 seats are elected at a national level through party-list proportional representation, bringing the total number of seats to 300.
