= Cyclades (constituency) =

Parliamentary constituency of Greece

- Electoral constituency for the Hellenic Parliament
- Cyclades within Greece
- Regional units: Andros; Kea-Kythnos; Milos; Mykonos; Naxos; Paros; Thira; Syros; Tinos
- Administrative region: South Aegean
- Population: 130,052 (2015)

Current constituency
- Created: 2012
- Number of members: 4 (since 2015); 3 (until 2015)

The Cyclades electoral constituency (Greek: Εκλογική περιφέρεια Κυκλάδων) is a parliamentary constituency of Greece.

== Election Results ==
=== Parliamentary ===
2000

2004

2007

2009

5/2012

6/2012

1/2015

9/2015

2019

5/2023

6/2023

=== European ===
2009

2014

2024

== Members ==
Election	MP (party)	MP (party)	MP (party)	MP (party)
2007	Giannis Vroutsis (New Democracy)	Aria Manousou-Binipoulou (New Democracy)	Panagiotis Rigas (PASOK)	3 MPs until 2015
2009	Giannis Vroutsis (New Democracy)	Georgios Papamanolis (PASOK)	Panagiotis Rigas (PASOK)	3 MPs until 2015
May 2012	Giannis Vroutsis (New Democracy)	Nikolaos Syrmalenios (PASOK)	Marios Voutsinos (Independent Greeks)	3 MPs until 2015
June 2012	Giannis Vroutsis (New Democracy)	Nikolaos Syrmalenios (PASOK)	Panagiotis Rigas (PASOK)	3 MPs until 2015
February 2015	Giannis Vroutsis (New Democracy)	Nikolaos Syrmalenios (PASOK)	Antonios Syrigos (PASOK)	Nikolaos Manios (PASOK)
September 2015	Giannis Vroutsis (New Democracy)	Nikolaos Syrmalenios (PASOK)	Antonios Syrigos (PASOK)	Nikolaos Manios (PASOK)
2019	Giannis Vroutsis (New Democracy)	Katerina Monogyou (New Democracy)	Filippos Fortomas (New Democracy)	Markos Kafouros (New Democracy)
May 2023	Giannis Vroutsis (New Democracy)	Katerina Monogyou (New Democracy)	Filippos Fortomas (New Democracy)	Nikolaos Syrmalenios (PASOK)
June 2023	Giannis Vroutsis (New Democracy)	Katerina Monogyou (New Democracy)	Filippos Fortomas (New Democracy)	Markos Kafouros (New Democracy)

== See also ==
- List of parliamentary constituencies of Greece
