= Hara Kefalidou =

Greek politician (born 1965)

Hara Kefalidou (born 1965) is a Greek politician from the Movement for Change. She was shadow education minister in the Greek Parliament, representing Drama.

== See also ==
- List of members of the Hellenic Parliament, 2019
