= Katerina Notopoulou =

Greek politician (born 1988)

- Κατερίνα Νοτοπούλου
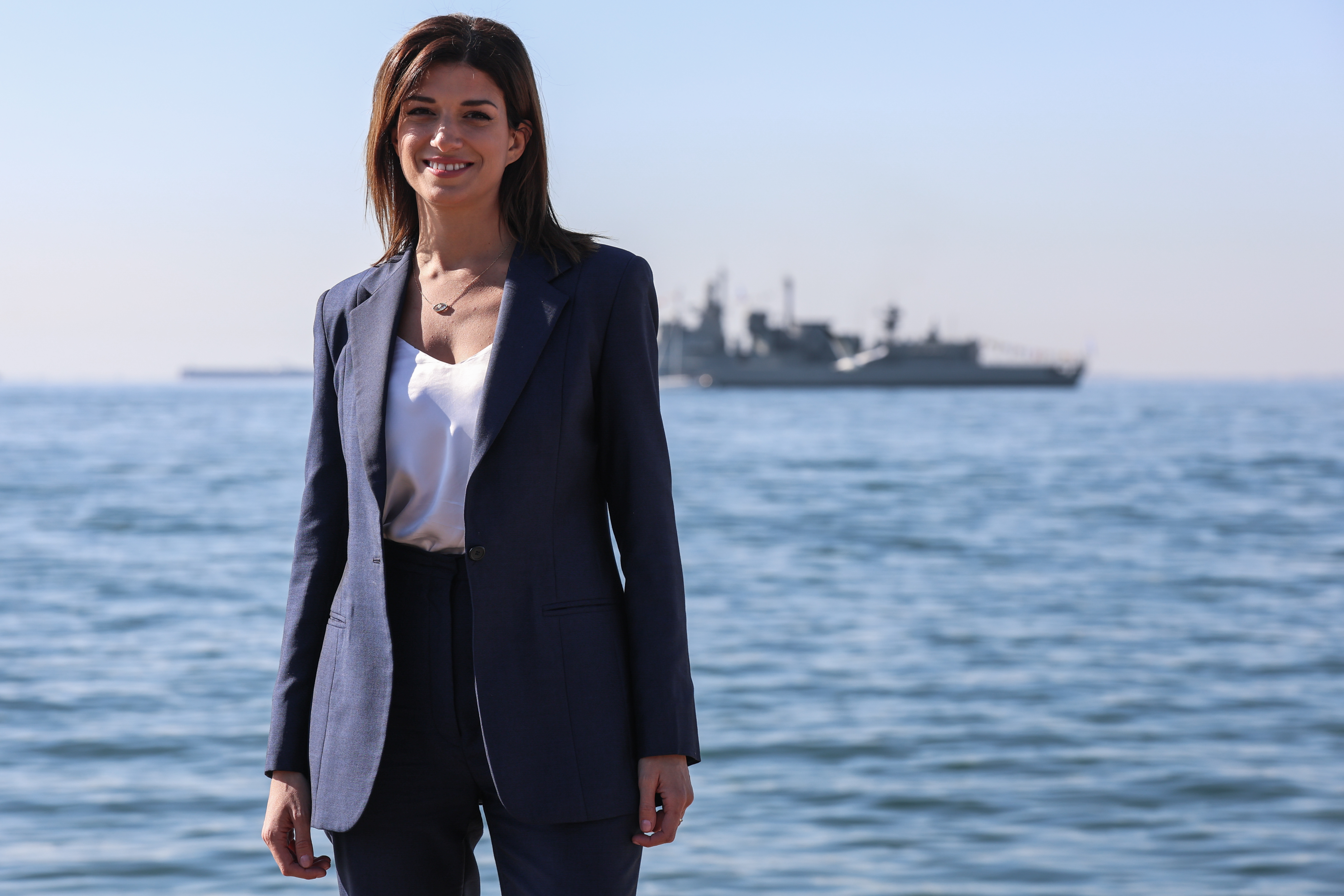
- Notopoulou in 2024

Member of the Hellenic Parliament
- Incumbent
- Assumed office 7 July 2019
- Constituency: Thessaloniki A

Personal details
- Born: 30 July 1988 (age 38)
- Party: Syriza
- Education: Aristotle University of Thessaloniki; University of Macedonia

Katerina Notopoulou (Greek: Κατερίνα Νοτοπούλου; born 30 July 1988 in Thessaloniki) is a Greek politician serving as a member of the Hellenic Parliament since 2019. From 2018 to 2019, she served as Deputy Minister for Macedonia and Thrace.
