= Andreas Nikolakopoulos =

Greek politician

Andreas Theodorou Nikolakopoulos

Member of the Hellenic Parliament for Ileia

Personal details
- Born: August 25, 1974 (age 52)
- Website: andreasnikolakopoulos.gr

Andreas Theodorou Nikolakopoulos is a Greek politician who is a member of the Hellenic Parliament.

== Biography ==
He studied law at the National and Kapodistrian University of Athens and international commercial law at the University of Essex.
