= Theofilos Xanthopoulos =

- Θεόφιλος Ξανθόπουλος

Member of the Hellenic Parliament
- Incumbent
- Assumed office 7 July 2019
- Constituency: Drama

Acting Leader of Syriza in the Hellenic Parliament
- In office 9 July 2026 – 18 July 2026
- Preceded by: Sokratis Famellos (As an elected leader)
- Succeeded by: Rena Dourou (As an elected leader)

Personal details
- Born: 1957 (age 68–69) Drama, Greece
- Party: Coalition of the Radical Left
- Education: Democritus University of Thrace
- Occupation: lawyer

Theofilos Xanthopoulos (Greek: Θεόφιλος Ξανθόπουλος; born 1957) is a Greek lawyer and politician of the Coalition of the Radical Left (Syriza).
