= Anna Efthymiou =

Greek politician

Anna Taxiarchi Eythymiou
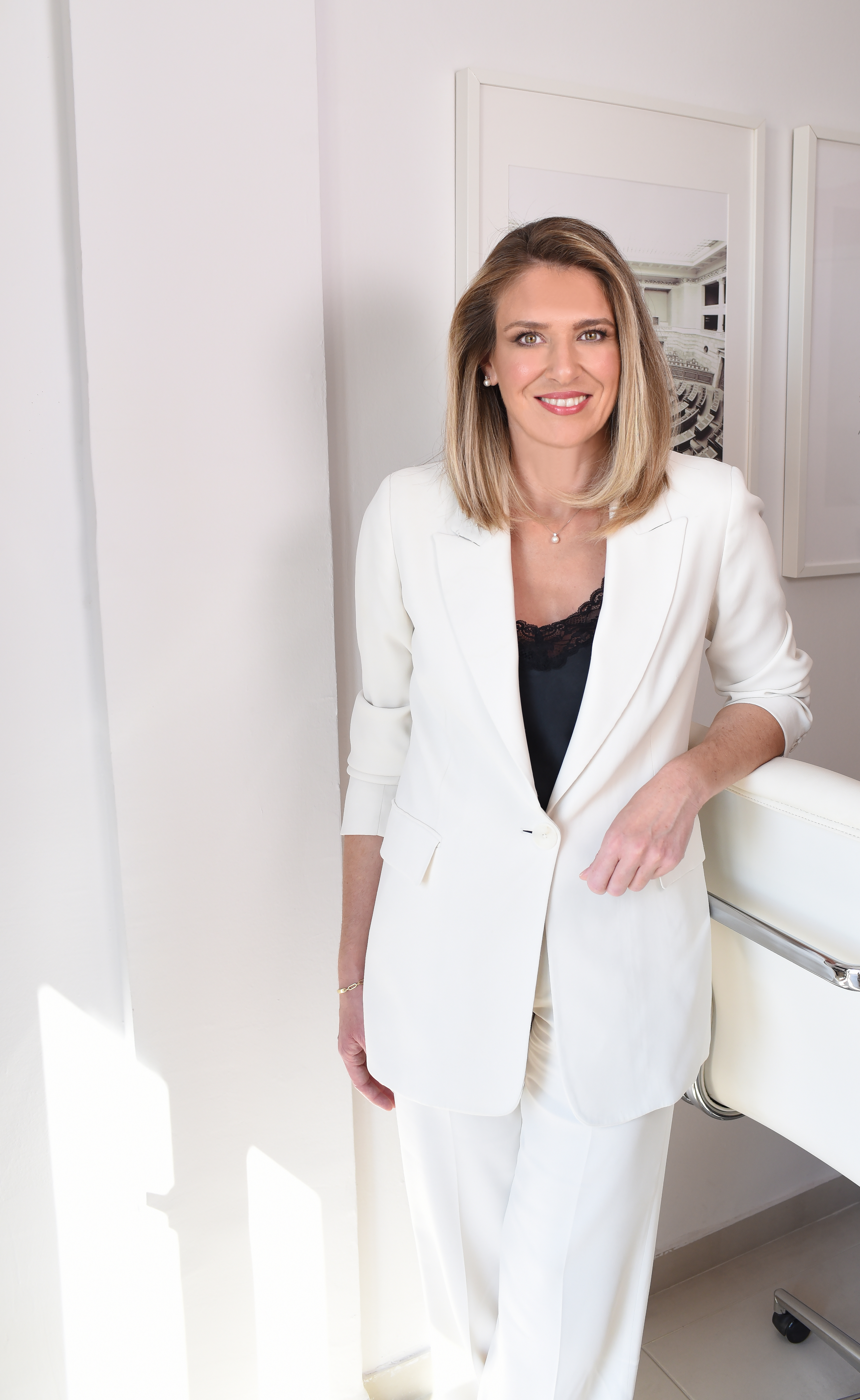
- Eythymiou in 2024

Member of the Hellenic Parliament for Thessaloniki A

Personal details
- Born: 10 June 1980 (age 46)
- Children: 2
- Education: Aristotle University of Thessaloniki
- Occupation: Lawyer

Anna Efthymiou (born 10 June 1980) is a Greek politician who is a member of the Hellenic Parliament.

== Biography ==
Efthymiou was elected in 2019.
