= Mpourchan Mparan =

Greek member of parliament

Mpourchan Mparan (Greek: Μπαράν Μπουρχάν, romanized: Mpourchán Mparán, Turkish: Burhan Baran; born September 20, 1959, in Sounio, Xánthi, Greece) is a Greek psychiatrist and politician, and a member of the Turkish community of Greece who studied at the Istanbul University (1978-1984) and the University of Cologne. During the Greek legislative elections of 2019, Baran was elected deputy to the Hellenic Parliament on the list of the Movement for Change (KINIMA) in the constituency of Xánthi. He is a member of both PASOK – Movement for Change and the Panhellenic Socialist Movement (PASOK).

Currently he is accused of illegally prescribing drugs. On 13 April 2024 he has been removed from the P.G. until his judicial case is completed. He was found guilty in February 2025, so there is no prospect of him returning to PASOK.

Baran is married and has two children.
