= Giorgos Tsipras =

Greek politician

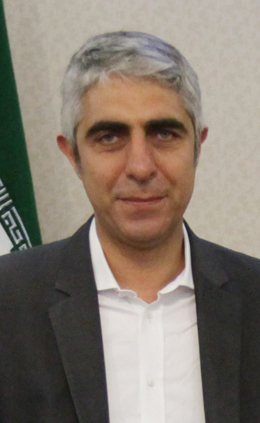
Giorgos Tsipras during a visit to Tehran

Giorgos Tsipras (Greek: Γιώργος Τσίπρας; born 1966, Athens) is a Greek politician.

He graduated from the Varvakeio High School and holds a degree in Mechanical Engineering from the National Technical University of Athens.

He has been a member of Syriza's Central Committee since 2012, and in 2019, he was elected member of parliament for West Attica. He is a cousin of former Syriza prime minister Alexis Tsipras, which has led to accusations of nepotism from political opponents.
