= Anna Mani Papadimitriou =

Greek politician and lawyer (born 1964)

Anna Eyaggelou Mani Papadimitriou
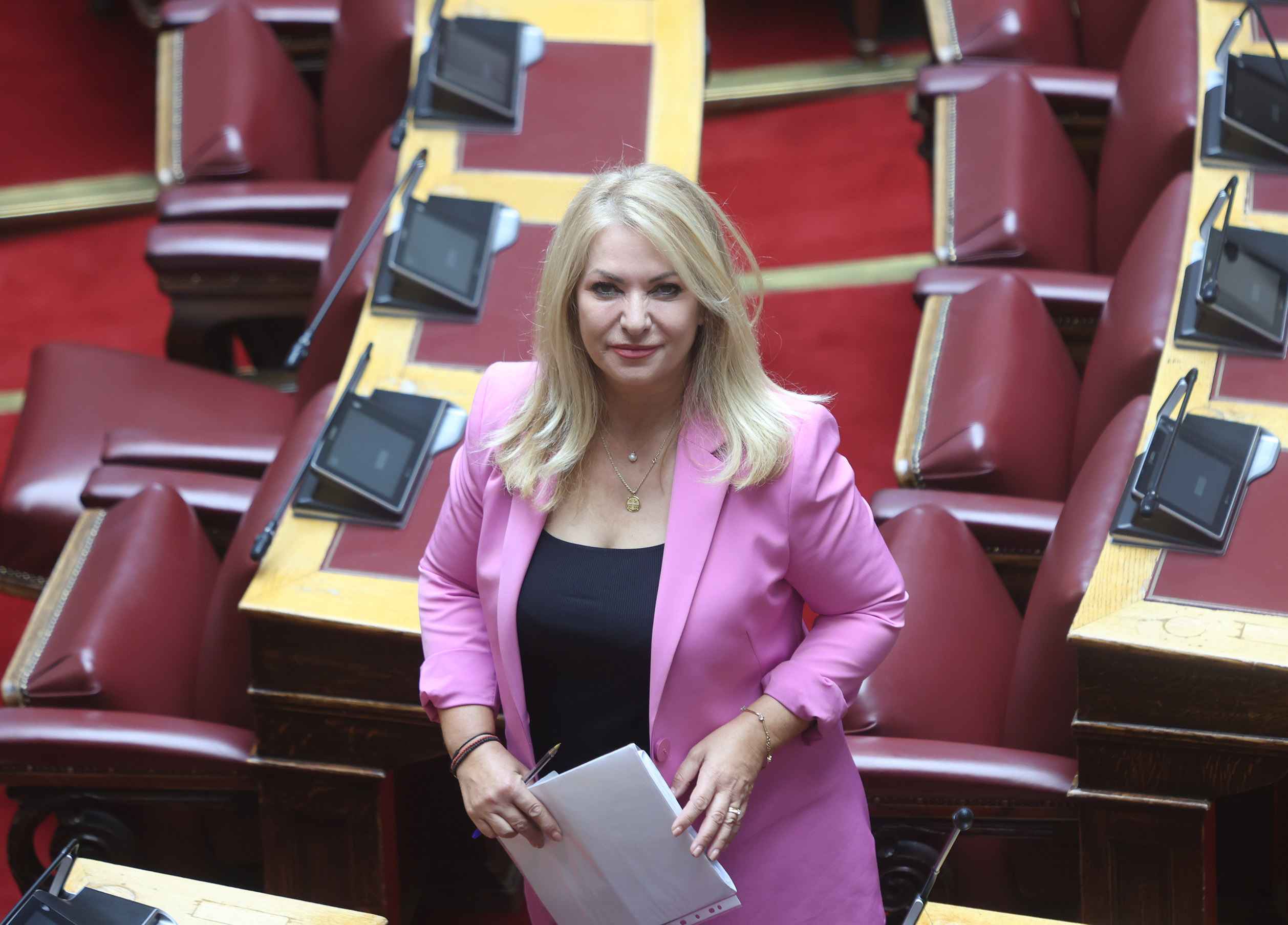
- Anna Mani Papadimitriou in 2022

Member of the Hellenic Parliament for Pieria
- Incumbent
- Assumed office 2012

Personal details
- Born: 18 August 1964 (age 62) Katerini, Greece
- Party: New Democracy
- Children: 2
- Education: Aristotelian University of Thessaloniki
- Occupation: Lawyer

Anna Mani Papadimitriou (born 18 August 1964) is a Greek politician who is a member of the Hellenic Parliament.

== Biography ==
Papadimitriou is a graduate of Law School at the Aristotelian University of Thessaloniki and was elected in 2012.
