= Ioannis Loverdos =

Greek politician

- Γιάννης Λοβέρδος

Member of Parliament for Athens B2
- Incumbent
- Assumed office 7 July 2019

Deputy Minister of Foreign Affairs
- Incumbent
- Assumed office 14 March 2025

Personal details
- Born: Ioannis Michail Giannis Petrou Loverdos; 10 April 1959 (age 67) Vyronas, Greece
- Party: New Democracy
- Education: National and Kapodistrian University of Athens

Ioannis Loverdos (born 10 April 1959) is a Greek politician. He has been the Deputy Minister of Foreign Affairs since 14 March 2025.

== Early life ==
Ioannis Michail Giannis Petrou Loverdos was born on 10 April 1959 in Vyronas, Greece. He attended law school at the National and Kapodistrian University of Athens.

== Career ==
=== Deputy Minister of Foreign Affairs ===
On 14 March 2025, Loverdos was appointed as the Deputy Minister of Foreign Affairs in the second cabinet of Kyriakos Mitsotakis.

Loverdos attended the 2025 New York Peace Conference on Gaza on behalf of the Greek government.
