= Konstantinos Tsiaras =

Greek politician (born 1966)

- Κωνσταντίνος Τσιάρας
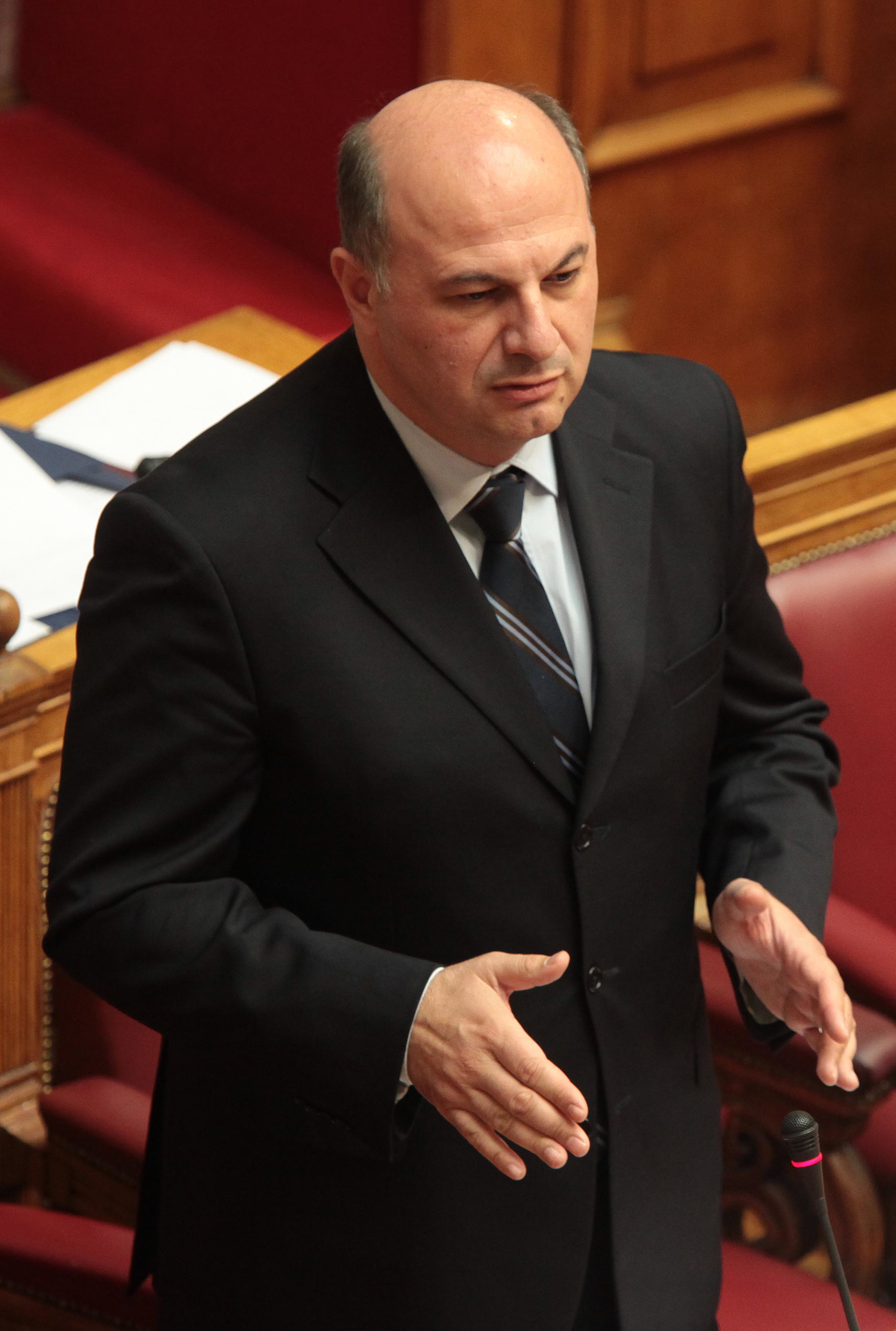

Minister for Rural Development and Food
- In office 14 June 2024 – 3 April 2026
- Prime Minister: Kyriakos Mitsotakis
- Preceded by: Lefteris Avgenakis
- Succeeded by: Margaritis Schinas

Minister for Justice
- In office 9 July 2019 – 26 May 2023
- Prime Minister: Kyriakos Mitsotakis
- Preceded by: Michalis Kalogirou
- Succeeded by: Philippos Spyropoulos

Deputy Minister for Foreign Affairs
- In office 5 July 2012 – 25 June 2013
- Prime Minister: Antonis Samaras
- Preceded by: Demetri Dollis
- Succeeded by: Akis Gerontopoulos

Member of the Hellenic Parliament for Karditsa
- Incumbent
- Assumed office 7 March 2004

Personal details
- Born: 2 July 1966 (age 60) Karditsa
- Party: New Democracy
- Education: Democritus University of Thrace; University of Athens

Konstantinos Tsiaras (Greek: Κωνσταντίνος Τσιάρας; born 2 July 1966) is a Greek politician and member of New Democracy who served as Minister for Rural Development and Food in the second cabinet of Kyriakos Mitsotakis from 2024 to 2026, Minister for Justice in the first Mitsotakis cabinet from 2019 to 2023, and Deputy Minister for Foreign Affairs in the cabinet of Antonis Samaras from 2012 to 2013. He has represented the Karditsa constituency of the Hellenic Parliament since the 2004 election. He resigned his cabinet position on 3 April 2026, following a European Union investigation into alleged farm subsidy fraud.

== Education ==
Tsiaras graduated from the School of Medicine of the Democritus University of Thrace, with a specialization in microbiology-biopathology. He received his doctorate from the University of Athens Medical School. In addition to Greek, his native language, he speaks English, French, German, Italian, and Russian.

== See also ==
- Second cabinet of Kyriakos Mitsotakis
