= Argolis (constituency) =

Parliamentary constituency of Greece

Argolis constituency in Greece

Argolis (Greek: Εκλογική περιφέρεια Αργολίδας) is a constituency of the Hellenic Parliament.

Argolis elected 3 MPs in the June 2023 Greek legislative election.

== See also ==
- List of parliamentary constituencies of Greece
