= Giannis Vroutsis =

Greek politician

- Ιωάννης Βρούτσης
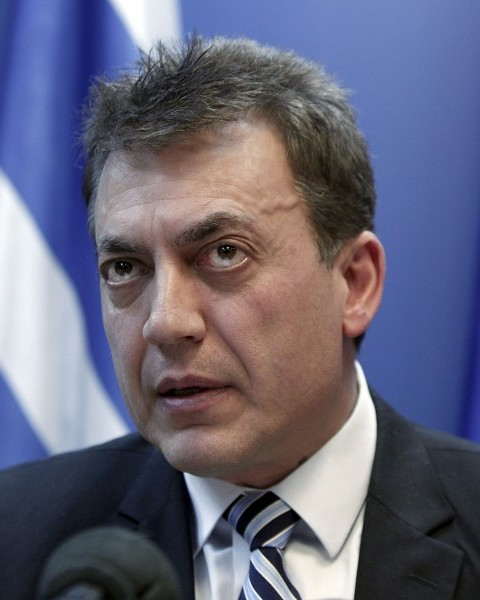
- Vroutsis in 2014

Alternate Minister for Sport
- Incumbent
- Assumed office 28 July 2023
- Prime Minister: Kyriakos Mitsotakis

Minister for Labour and Social Affairs
- In office 9 July 2019 – 5 January 2021
- Prime Minister: Kyriakos Mitsotakis
- Preceded by: Effie Achtsioglou (as Minister for Labour, Social Security and Social Solidarity)
- Succeeded by: Kostis Hatzidakis

Minister for Labour, Social Security and Welfare
- In office 21 June 2012 – 27 January 2015
- Prime Minister: Antonis Samaras
- Preceded by: Antonis Roupakiotis (as Minister for Labour and Social Security)
- Succeeded by: Panos Skourletis (as Minister for Labour and Social Solidarity)

Member of the Hellenic Parliament
- Incumbent
- Assumed office 16 September 2007
- Constituency: Cyclades

Personal details
- Born: 1 June 1963 (age 63) Athens, Greece
- Party: New Democracy
- Education: National and Kapodistrian University of Athens (BA); Panteion University (MA)
- Profession: Lawyer, economist, politician
- Website: ivroutsis.gr

Ioannis Vroutsis (Greek: Ιωάννης Βρούτσης; born 1 June 1963), commonly shortened to Giannis (Γιάννης), is a Greek economist, lawyer and politician serving as Alternate Minister for Sport in the Second Cabinet of Kyriakos Mitsotakis from July 2023. He has served as a member of parliament for the Cyclades since 16 September 2007.

Having previously served as Minister for Labour, Social Security and Welfare in the Cabinet of Antonis Samaras (21 June 2012 – 27 January 2015) and Minister for Labour and Social Affairs in the First Cabinet of Kyriakos Mitsotakis (9 July 2019 – 5 January 2021).

== Early life and education ==
Vroutsis was born in Athens on 1 June 1963 and is originally from Naxos and Amorgos. He studied economics at the School of Law, Economics and Political Sciences of the National and Kapodistrian University of Athens, where he was awarded a scholarship. He also holds a master's degree from Panteion University. He has previously worked as an economist at the Ministry of Finance.

== Political career ==
He began to participate in politics as a member of ONNED, the youth wing of New Democracy. He has twice been a member of its executive committee, as secretary of the Student Independent Movement and as head of ONNED organizations in the Attica basin.

He had an active and long-standing involvement in local government. He served as a municipal councillor of Vyronas in 1990.

He was first elected to the Hellenic Parliament for the Cyclades constituency in 2007, and was re-elected in 2009, May and June 2012, January and September 2015, 2019, and May and June 2023.

=== First term as Minister for Labour ===
He served as New Democracy's chief policy officer from 2009 to 2011, when he was appointed ND's chief financial officer under Antonis Samaras. On 21 June 2012, he was appointed Minister of Labour, Social Security and Welfare in the coalition government of Antonis Samaras.

=== In opposition ===
Following the January 2015 national elections, on 5 February 2015, by decision of the party president, he is appointed along with Kyriakos Mitsotakis and Adonis Georgiadis as a party parliamentary spokesman.

On 13 January 2016, by the decision of the new party president Kyriakos Mitsotakis, he was reappointed parliamentary spokesman alongside Nikos Dendias and Niki Kerameus.

=== Second term as Minister for Labour ===
Following the 2019 election and the formation of a Mitsotakis government, Vroutsis was appointed Minister for Labour and Social Affairs.

His first act as minister was to reverse the previous Syriza government's decision to allow foreign nationals to apply for a social security number in Greece.

In April 2020, during the initial outbreak of the COVID-19 pandemic, he announced a voucher program for scientists (lawyers, engineers/architects, educators and others) where they would complete a basic computer training program in exchange for a 600 euro voucher. The implementation of the program was plagued by various technical difficulties and the content was characterized by the opposition as low quality, consisting of scanned and poorly translated pages of books. The program was eventually pulled and vouchers were given out without conditions.

He was replaced by Kostis Hatzidakis after the 5 January 2021 cabinet reshuffle.

=== Member of Parliament ===
After leaving the first Mitsotakis cabinet in January 2021, he was once again appointed parliamentary spokesman.

In March 2021, he stated in an interview to the Documento newspaper that TV personality Menios Fourthiotis had entered his ministry office with his private security team and threatened him over his attempt to stop a fraud case involving himself.
