= Arcadia (constituency) =

Parliamentary constituency of Greece

Arcadia constituency in Greece.

Arcadia (Greek: Εκλογική περιφέρεια Αρκαδίας) is a constituency of the Hellenic Parliament.

Arcadia elected 3 MPs in the June 2023 Greek legislative election.

== See also ==
- List of parliamentary constituencies of Greece
