= Aetolia-Acarnania (constituency) =

Parliamentary constituency of Greece

Location of the Aetolia-Acarnania constituency.

Aetolia-Acarnania (Greek: Εκλογική περιφέρεια Αιτωλοακαρνανίας) is a constituency of the Hellenic Parliament.

== See also ==
- List of parliamentary constituencies of Greece
