= Euboea (constituency) =

Parliamentary constituency of Greece

Euboea within Greece.

The Euboea electoral constituency (Greek: Εκλογική περιφέρεια Ευβοίας) is a parliamentary constituency of Greece.

== List of MPs ==
=== June 2023 ===
Name	Party
Thanasis Zebilis	New Democracy
Simos Kedikoglou	New Democracy
Konstantina Karabatsoli	New Democracy
Simos Kedikoglou	Syriza
Katerina Kazani	PASOK – Movement for Change
George Marinos	Communist Party of Greece

=== 2019 ===
Name	Party
Evangelos Apostolou	Syriza
Miltiadis Hatzigiannakis	Syriza
Evangelos Apostolou	Syriza
Symeon Kedikoglou (Simos Kedikoglou)	New Democracy
Giorgos Marinos	Communist Party of Greece
Spyros Pnevmatikos	New Democracy
Thanasis Zempilis	New Democracy

== See also ==
- List of parliamentary constituencies of Greece
