= Serres (constituency) =

Parliamentary constituency of Greece

- Electoral constituency for the Hellenic Parliament
- Imathia within Greece
- Regional units: Serres
- Administrative region: Central Macedonia
- Population: 231,449 (2015)

Current constituency
- Created: 2012
- Number of members: 7

The Serres electoral constituency (Greek: περιφέρεια Σερρών) is a parliamentary constituency of Greece.

== See also ==
- List of parliamentary constituencies of Greece
