= Heraklion (constituency) =

Parliamentary constituency of Greece

- Electoral constituency for the Hellenic Parliament
- Heraklion within Greece
- Regional units: Heraklion
- Administrative region: Crete
- Population: 250,886 (2015)

Current constituency
- Created: 2012
- Number of members: 8

The Heraklion electoral constituency (Greek: περιφέρεια Ηρακλείου) is a parliamentary constituency of Greece.

== See also ==
- List of parliamentary constituencies of Greece
