= Kavala (constituency) =

Parliamentary constituency of Greece

- Electoral constituency for the Hellenic Parliament
- Kavala constituency within Greece
- Regional units: Kavala, Thasos
- Administrative region: Eastern Macedonia and Thrace
- Population: 144,892 (2015)

Current constituency
- Created: 2012
- Number of members: 4

The Kavala electoral constituency (Greek: περιφέρεια Καβάλας) is a parliamentary constituency of Greece.

== See also ==
- List of parliamentary constituencies of Greece
