= Lesbos (constituency) =

Parliamentary constituency of Greece

- Electoral constituency for the Hellenic Parliament
- Lesbos constituency within Greece
- Regional units: Lesbos, Lemnos
- Administrative region: North Aegean
- Population: 132,951 (2015)

Current constituency
- Created: 2012
- Number of members: 3

The Lesbos electoral constituency (Greek: περιφέρεια Λέσβου) is a parliamentary constituency of Greece.

== See also ==
- List of parliamentary constituencies of Greece
