= Kilkis (constituency) =

Parliamentary constituency of Greece

- Electoral constituency for the Hellenic Parliament
- Kilkis within Greece
- Regional units: Kilkis
- Administrative region: Central Macedonia
- Population: 105,398 (2015)

Current constituency
- Created: 2012
- Number of members: 3

The Kilkis electoral constituency (Greek: περιφέρεια Κιλκίς) is a parliamentary constituency of Greece.

== See also ==
- List of parliamentary constituencies of Greece
