= Boeotia (constituency) =

Parliamentary constituency of Greece

Boeotia constituency in Greece.

Boeotia (Greek: Εκλογική περιφέρεια Βοιωτίας) is a constituency of the Hellenic Parliament.

Boeotia elected 4 MPs in the June 2023 Greek legislative election.

== See also ==
- List of parliamentary constituencies of Greece
