= Magnesia (constituency) =

Parliamentary constituency of Greece

- Electoral constituency for the Hellenic Parliament
- Magnesia constituency within Greece
- Regional units: Magnesia, Sporades
- Administrative region: Thessaly
- Population: 175,784 (2011)

Current constituency
- Created: 2012
- Number of members: 5

The Magnesia electoral constituency (Greek: περιφέρεια Μαγνησίας) is a parliamentary constituency of Greece.

== See also ==
- List of parliamentary constituencies of Greece
