= Chios (constituency) =

Parliamentary constituency of Greece

- Electoral constituency for the Hellenic Parliament
- Chios constituency within Greece
- Regional units: Chios
- Administrative region: North Aegean
- Population: 64,904 (2015)

Current constituency
- Created: 2012
- Number of members: 2

The Chios electoral constituency (Greek: περιφέρεια Χίου) is a parliamentary constituency of Greece.

== See also ==
- List of parliamentary constituencies of Greece
