= Evros (constituency) =

Parliamentary constituency of Greece

- Electoral constituency for the Hellenic Parliament
- Evros within Greece
- Regional units: Evros
- Administrative region: Eastern Macedonia and Thrace
- Population: 167,818 (2015)

Current constituency
- Created: 2012
- Number of members: 4

The Evros electoral constituency (Greek: περιφέρεια Έβρου) is a parliamentary constituency of Greece.

== See also ==
- List of parliamentary constituencies of Greece
