= Arta (constituency) =

Electoral district in Epirus, Greece

Arta constituency in Greece.

Arta (Greek: Εκλογική περιφέρεια Άρτας) is a constituency of the Hellenic Parliament.

Arta elected 2 MPs in the June 2023 Greek legislative election.

== See also ==
- List of parliamentary constituencies of Greece
