= Trikala (constituency) =

Parliamentary constituency of Greece

- Electoral constituency for the Hellenic Parliament
- Trikala within Greece
- Regional units: Trikala
- Administrative region: Thessaly
- Population: 149,707 (2011)

Current constituency
- Created: 2012
- Number of members: 5

The Trikala electoral constituency (Greek: περιφέρεια Τρικάλων) is a parliamentary constituency of Greece.

== See also ==
- List of parliamentary constituencies of Greece
