= Kozani (constituency) =

Parliamentary constituency of Greece

- Electoral constituency for the Hellenic Parliament
- Kozaniwithin Greece
- Regional units: Kozani
- Administrative region: Western Macedonia
- Population: 163,418 (2015)

Current constituency
- Created: 2012
- Number of members: 5

The Kozani electoral constituency (Greek: περιφέρεια Κοζάνης) is a parliamentary constituency of Greece.

== See also ==
- List of parliamentary constituencies of Greece
