= Phthiotis (constituency) =

Electolar district in Greece

- Electoral constituency for the Hellenic Parliament
- Phthiotis within Greece
- Regional units: Phthiotis

Current constituency
- Number of members: 4

The Phthiotis electoral constituency (Greek: Εκλογική περιφέρεια Φθιώτιδας) is a parliamentary constituency of Greece.

== Election Results ==
=== Parliamentary ===
2000

2004

2007

2009

5/2012

6/2012

1/2015

9/2015

2019

5/2023

6/2023

=== European ===
2009

2014

2019

2024

== Members of parliament ==
=== List of members of the Hellenic Parliament, June 2023 ===
Party	Politician
New Democracy	Christos Staikouras
New Democracy	Giannis Oikonomou
New Democracy	George Kotronias
Syriza	Yannis Sarakiotis

== See also ==
- List of parliamentary constituencies of Greece
