= List of members of the Hellenic Parliament, June 2023 =

Greek elections

20th (K΄)^{a} Plenary Session
←	19th (ΙΘ΄)
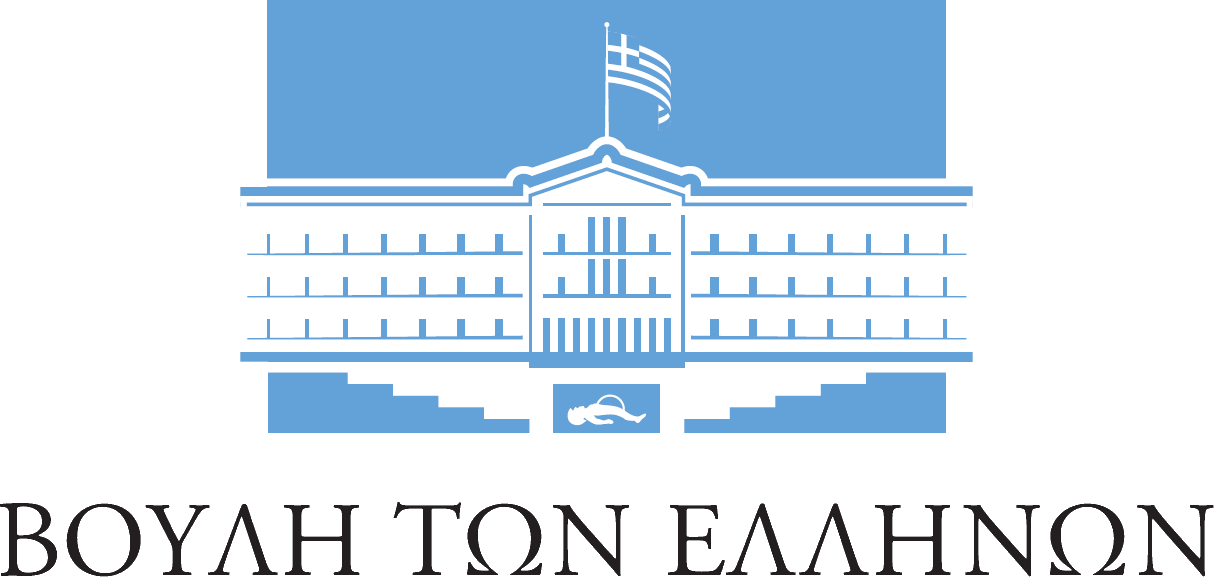

Overview
- Legislative body: Hellenic Parliament
- Jurisdiction: Greece
- Meeting place: Old Royal Palace, Athens
- Term: 3 July 2023 –
- Election: 25 June 2023
- Government: Second Cabinet of Kyriakos Mitsotakis
- Members: 300; 297 (from June 2025)
- President: Nikitas Kaklamanis (ND)
- Vice Presidents: List: Ioannis Plakiotakis (ND); Georgios Georgandas (ND); Athanasios Bouras (ND); Paris Koukoulopoulos (PASOK – KINAL); Vacant (Syriza); Giorgos Lamproulis (KKE); Vasilis Viliardos (EL)

Sessions
- 1st: 3 July 2023 – 6 October 2024
- 2nd: 7 October 2024 – 3 October 2025
- 3rd: 6 October 2025 – 2 October 2026
- 4th: 5 October 2026 –

This is a list of the 300 members who were elected to the Hellenic Parliament – for the 20th parliamentary term (Κ΄ in Greek numerals) – in the June 2023 legislative election, held on 25 June 2023.
The "20th parliamentary term" officially began on Monday 3 July 2023 swearing in the oath of members of the Parliament.

In these elections, the voters did not elect the MPs – instead, the order of precedence was determined on the basis of a list drawn up by the parties. However, the parties drew up their lists on the basis of the votes of the MPs in the previous elections in May 2023. Of the 300 MPs (69 of whom are women), 34 have been elected for the first time.

On June 12, 2025, the Special Highest Court officially notified the Parliament of its decision to annul the election of three MPs from the Spartans party, against whom annulment appeals had been filed, on the grounds of misleading voters (the court ruled that Ilias Kasidiaris was the guiding figure behind the party’s candidates, a fact concealed from voters). The three MPs were stripped of their positions without being replaced by alternates, as is customary, since the court determined that the nature of the offense prohibits the allocation of seats to alternate MPs. Thus, for the first time since the Metapolitefsi (post-1974 democratic transition), the Parliament’s Plenary will effectively consist of 297 MPs. The Speaker of the Parliament stated that the majority threshold (Dedilomeni Principle) will not be reduced to reflect the decrease in the number of MPs, but will remain at 151 MPs.

== Composition ==
Initial composition (June 2023)	Current composition (As of November 2026)
New Democracy: 158 Syriza: 47 PASOK – Movement for Change: 32 Communist Party of Greece: 21 Spartans: 12 Greek Solution: 12 Niki: 10 Course of Freedom: 8	New Democracy: 156 PASOK – Movement for Change: 37 Communist Party of Greece: 21 Syriza: 13 Greek Solution: 11 Niki: 8 Course of Freedom: 5 New Left: 4 Spartans: 2 Independents: 47 Vacant: 3

== Members of Parliament by parliamentary group ==
=== New Democracy ===
Constituency	Full name	Notes
Nationwide	Ireni Agapidaki	
Nationwide	Theodoros Skylakakis	
Nationwide	Christos Stylianides	
Nationwide	Ioanna Lytrivi	
Nationwide	Giorgos Stamatis	
Nationwide	Nefeli Chatziioannidou	
Nationwide	Maria Polyzou	
Athens A	Kyriakos Pierrakakis	
Athens A	Vassilis Kikilias	
Athens A	Olga Kefalogianni	
Athens A	Thanos Plevris	
Athens A	Nikitas Kaklamanis	Speaker of the Hellenic Parliament from 22 January 2025
Athens B1	Kostis Hatzidakis	
Athens B1	Adonis Georgiadis	
Athens B1	Niki Kerameus	
Athens B1	Dimitris Kairidis	
Athens B1	Zoe Rapti	
Athens B1	Theodoros Roussopoulos	
Athens B1	Nikos Papathanasis	
Athens B2	Michalis Chrysochoidis	
Athens B2	~~Miltiadis Varvitsiotis~~ until 25 January 2024; Dimitrios Kalogeropoulos from 25 January 2024	Miltiadis Varvitsiotis resigned, leaving politics for good, and was replaced by Dimitrios Kalogeropoulos.
Athens B2	Ioannis Loverdos	
Athens B2	Maria Syrengela	
Athens B3	Nikos Dendias	
Athens B3	Takis Theodorikakos	
Athens B3	Konstantinos Kyranakis	
Athens B3	Vassilis Spanakis	
Athens B3	Dionysis Hatzidakis	
Athens B3	Harry Theoharis	
Athens B3	Yannis Kallianos	
Athens B3	Anna Karamanli	
Athens B3	Sofia Voultepsi	
Piraeus A	Kostas Katsafados	
Piraeus A	Domna Michailidou	
Piraeus A	Nikos Vlachakos	
Piraeus B	George Vrettakos	
Piraeus B	Michalis Livanos	
Piraeus B	Dimitris Markopoulos	
Piraeus B	Ioannis Tragakis	
Attica A	Sofia Zacharaki	
Attica A	Makis Voridis	
Attica A	Stelios Petsas	
Attica A	George Vlachos	
Attica A	Vassilis Oikonomou	
Attica B	George Kotsiras	
Attica B	Athanasios Bouras	
Attica B	Evangelos Liakos	
Aetolia-Acarnania	~~Marios Salmas~~	Salmas was expelled from the parliamentary group on 23 September 2024 for criticising certain aspects of the New Democracy government. He refused to resign his seat and became an independent.
Aetolia-Acarnania	Kostas Karagounis	
Aetolia-Acarnania	Thanasis Papathanasis	
Argolis	Ioannis Andrianos	
Arcadia	Kostas Vlasis	
Arta	George Stylios	
Achaea	Christina Alexopoulou	
Achaea	Andreas Katsaniotis	
Achaea	Iasonas Fotilas	
Boeotia	Lefteris Ktistakis	
Grevena	~~Ioannis Giatsos~~ until 20 May 2024; Athanasios Stavropoulos from 23 May 2024	On 20 May 2024, Giatsos was removed from his seat. Athanasios Stavropoulos replaced him.
Drama	Dimitris Kyriazidis	On 8 March 2025, he was expelled from the parliamentary group. On 8 October 2025, he rejoined.
Dodecanese	Giannis Pappas	
Dodecanese	Manos Konsolas	
Dodecanese	Mika Iatridi	
Dodecanese	Vassilis Ypsilantis	
Evros	Christos Dermentzopoulos	
Evros	Stavros Keletsis	
Evros	Tasos Dimoschakis	
Euboea	Thanasis Zebilis	
Euboea	Simos Kedikoglou	
Euboea	~~Spiros Pnevmatikos~~ until 27 June 2023; Konstantina Karabatsoli from 27 June 2023	Pnevmatikos resigned due to strong resentment caused by his statements contradicting the party's positions on health care. He surrendered his seat and was replaced by Konstantina Karabatsoli.
Evrytania	Tzina Economou	
Zakynthos	Dionisis Aktypis	
Elis	Andreas Nikolakopoulos	
Elis	Dionysia-Theodora Avgerinopoulou	
Elis	Dimitris Avramopoulos	
Imathia	~~Apostolos Vesyropoulos~~ until 21 August 2025 Stella Arabatzi from 28 August 2025	Died of cardiac arrest on 21 August 2025. His position was taken by the next candidate on the prefecture's ballot, Stella Arabatzi.
Imathia	Tasos Bartzokas	
Imathia	Lazaros Tsavdaridis	
Heraklion	Lefteris Avgenakis	On 3 July 2024, he was expelled from the parliamentary group. On 20 December 2024, he rejoined.
Heraklion	Konstantinos Kefalogiannis	
Heraklion	Maximos Senetakis	
Thesprotia	Vasileios Giogiakas	
Thessaloniki A	Kyriakos Mitsotakis	Prime Minister of Greece; President of New Democracy
Thessaloniki A	Stavros Kalafatis	
Thessaloniki A	Konstantinos Gioulekas	
Thessaloniki A	Elena Rapti	
Thessaloniki A	Anna Efthymiou	
Thessaloniki A	Dimitris Kouvelas	
Thessaloniki A	Stratos Simopoulos	
Thessaloniki A	Diamantis Golidakis	
Thessaloniki B	Dimitris Vartzopoulos	
Thessaloniki B	Theodoros Karaoglou	
Thessaloniki B	Fanis Papas	
Ioannina	~~Konstantinos Tasoulas~~ until 20 January 2025; Giorgos Amiras from 20 January 2025	Former President of the Hellenic Parliament. Konstantinos Tasoulas has resigned to run for President of the Republic in the 2025 Presidential elections. His seat has been taken by the runner up of Ioannina constituency, Giorgos Amiras.
Ioannina	Maria-Alexandra Kefala	
Kavala	Nikolaos Panagiotopoulos	
Kavala	Yannis Paschalidis	
Kavala	Makarios Lazaridis	
Kavala	Angeliki Delikari	
Karditsa	Konstantinos Tsiaras	
Karditsa	Giorgos Kotsos	
Karditsa	Asimina Skondra	
Karditsa	Aristotelis Spanias	
Kastoria	Maria Antoniou	
Corfu	Stefanos Gikas	
Kefalonia	Panagis Kappatos	
Kilkis	George Georgantas	
Kozani	Stathis Konstantinidis	
Kozani	Michalis Papadopoulos	
Corinthia	Christos Dimas	
Corinthia	~~Nikos Tagaras~~ until 29 May 2026; Kostas Kollias from 5 June 2026	On 29 May 2026, Tagaras died from cancer. Kostas Kollias replaced him.
Corinthia	Marilena Vilialis-Soukoulis	
Cyclades	Giannis Vroutsis	
Cyclades	Katerina Monogyou	
Cyclades	Filippos Fortomas	
Cyclades	Markos Kafouros	
Laconia	Neoclis Kritikos	
Laconia	Thanasis Davakis	
Larissa	Christos Kellas	
Larissa	Christos Kapetanos	
Larissa	Maximos Charakopoulos	
Lasithi	Giannis Plakiotakis	
Lesbos	Charalambos Athanasiou	
Lefkada	Thanasis Kavvadas	
Magnesia	Christos Triandopoulos	
Magnesia	Zetta Makri	
Magnesia	Christos Boukoros	
Messenia	~~Antonis Samaras~~	On 20 November 2024, Samaras was expelled from both the party and the parliamentary group because of his criticism of the government. He remains an independent MP.
Messenia	Miltos Chrysomallis	
Messenia	Yannis Lambropoulos	
Messenia	Pericles Mantas	
Xanthi	Spyros Tsilingiris	
Pella	Lakis Vasiliadis	
Pella	Dionysis Stamenitis	
Pella	George Karasmanis	
Pieria	Fontas Baraliakos	
Pieria	Anna Mani Papadimitriou	
Pieria	Spyros Koulkoudinas	
Preveza	Spyros Kyriakis	
Rethymno	Ioannis A. Kefalogiannis	
Rhodope	Euripides Stylianides	
Samos	Christodoulos Stefanadis	
Serres	Kostas Karamanlis	
Serres	Tasos Hatzivasileiou	
Serres	Fotini Arabatzi	
Serres	Theofilos Leontaridis	
Trikala	Kostas Skrekas	
Trikala	Thanasis Lioutas	
Trikala	Katerina Papakosta-Palioura	
Phthiotis	Christos Staikouras	
Phthiotis	Giannis Oikonomou	
Phthiotis	George Kotronias	
Florina	Stavros Papasotiriou	
Phocis	Yannis Bougas	
Chalkidiki	Yiannis Giorgos	
Chania	Dora Bakoyanni	
Chania	Sevi Voloudakis	
Chania	Alexandros Markogiannakis	
Chios	Notis Mitarachi	

=== PASOK – Movement for Change ===
Constituency	Full name	Notes
Nationwide	Evangelos Apostolakis	On 5 October 2026, nearly two years after leaving Syriza, he joined PASOK.
Nationwide	Panagiotis Doudonis	
Nationwide	Dimitris Manzos	
Athens A	Pavlos Geroulanos	
Athens B1	Milena Apostolaki	
Athens B2	Nadia Giannakopoulou	
Athens B3	Pavlos Christidis	
Piraeus B	Nina Kasimati	On 16 November 2026, after being expelled from the parliamentary group of Syriza, she joined PASOK.
Attica A	Myrto Korovesi	On 22 October 2026, after leaving Democrats – Progressive Centre, she joined PASOK.
Attica A	Manolis Christodoulakis	
Aetolia-Acarnania	Christina Staraka	
Argolis	Andreas Poulas	
Arcadia	~~Odysseas Konstantinopoulos~~ until 12 March 2026; Vaggelis Giannakouras from 23 March 2026	Odysseas Konstantinopoulos was expelled from the parliamentary group on 12 March 2026. The following day Konstantinopoulos resigned his seat. Vaggelis Giannakouras replaced him.
Achaea	George Papandreou	Former Prime Minister of Greece
Boeotia	George Mulkiotis	
Drama	Tasos Nikolaidis	
Dodecanese	George Nikitiadis	
Euboea	Katerina Kazani	
Elis	Michalis Katrinis	
Heraklion	Eleni Vatsina	
Heraklion	Fragkiskos Parasiris	
Thessaloniki A	Nikos Androulakis	President of PASOK – Movement for Change; Leader of the Official Opposition
Thessaloniki A	Rania Thraskia	On 17 February 2025, about two months after declaring her independence from Syriza, she joined PASOK.
Thessaloniki A	Michalis Chourdakis	On 28 July 2026, after being expelled from the parliamentary group of Course of Freedom and leaving Democrats – Progressive Centre, he joined PASOK.
Ioannina	Giannis Tsimaris	
Corfu	Alexandros Avlonitis	On 18 September 2026, after leaving both Syriza and Democrats – Progressive Centre, he joined PASOK.
Corfu	Dimitris Biagis	
Kilkis	Stefanos Parastatides	
Kilkis	Petros Pappas	On 5 March 2025, the former independent MP who had left SYRIZA became a member of PASOK.
Kozani	Paris Koukoulopoulos	
Laconia	Naya Grigorakou	
Larissa	Evangelia Liakoulis	
Lasithi	Katerina Spyridaki	
Lesbos	~~Panagiotis Paraskevaidis~~	On 16 February 2026, he was expelled from the parliamentary group.
Xanthi	~~Mpourchan Mparan~~	Mpourchan Mparan was accused of illegally prescribing drugs. On 9 April 2024 he was removed from the parliamentary group until the conclusion of his judicial case. He was found guilty in February 2025, leaving no prospect of his return to PASOK.
Rethymno	Manolis Chnaris	
Rhodope	Ilchan Achmet	
Chalkidiki	Apostolos Panas	
Chios	Stavros Michaelidis	

=== Communist Party of Greece ===
Constituency	Full name	Notes
Nationwide	Thanasis Pafilis	
Athens A	Liana Kanelli	
Athens B1	Dimitris Koutsoumpas	Party General Secretary & President of the Parliamentary Group
Athens B1	Aphrodite Ctena	
Athens B2	Vivi Daga	
Athens B3	Semina Digeni	
Athens B3	Christos Katsotis	
Piraeus A	Nikos Ambatielos	
Piraeus B	Diamanto Manolakou	
Attica A	Ioannis Giokas	
Attica B	Christos Tsokanis	
Aetolia-Acarnania	Nikolaos Papanastasis	
Achaea	Nikolaos Karathanasopoulos	
Euboea	George Marinos	
Heraklion	Manolis Syntyhakis	
Thessaloniki A	Giannis Delis	
Thessaloniki B	Leonidas Stoltidis	
Ioannina	Pacos Exarchos	
Larissa	Giorgos Lamproulis	
Lesbos	Maria Komninaka	
Magnesia	Vassilis Metaxas	

=== Syriza ===
Constituency	Full name	Notes
Nationwide	~~Othon Iliopoulos~~ until 28 August 2024; ~~Popi Tsapanidou~~ from 30 August 2024	On 28 August 2024, Iliopoulos resigned his seat. Popi Tsapanidou replaced him. On 16 July 2026, Tsapanidou left the parliamentary group and became an independent.
Nationwide	~~Evangelos Apostolakis~~	On 28 November 2024, instead of resigning his seat, he decided to become independent, disagreeing with the party's handling of the internal elections. On 5 October 2026, he joined PASOK.
Nationwide	Elena Akrita	
Athens A	~~Nasos Iliopoulos~~	On 23 November 2023, he disagreed with the way the party was being run under Stefanos Kasselakis and became independent.
Athens A	~~Dimitris Tzanakopoulos~~	On 23 November 2023, he disagreed with the way the party was being run under Stefanos Kasselakis and became independent.
Athens B1	~~Athina Linou~~	On 26 August 2024, she was expelled from the parliamentary group because of transparency issues in the NGO Prolepsis, which she leads. Refusing to resign, she became independent.
Athens B1	~~Euclid Tsakalotos~~	On 13 November 2023, he disagreed with the way the party was being run under Stefanos Kasselakis and became independent.
Athens B2	Rena Dourou	President of the parliamentary group
Athens B2	~~Effie Achtsioglou~~	On 23 November 2023, she disagreed with the way the party was being run under Stefanos Kasselakis and became independent.
Athens B3	Nikos Pappas	
Athens B3	~~Rallia Christidou~~	On 11 November 2024, she announced her independence from Syriza, by siding with Stefanos Kasselakis.
Athens B3	~~Theano Fotiou~~	On 23 November 2023, she disagreed with the way the party was being run under Stefanos Kasselakis and became independent.
Piraeus A	~~Alexis Tsipras~~ until 6 October 2025; ~~Thodoris Dritsas~~ from 8 October 2025	Former Prime minister of Greece. Alexis Tsipras resigned as a member of parliament on October 6, 2025. The runner-up on the party's ticket for that constituency was Thodoris Dritsas, who chose to join the parliamentary group of the New Left, bringing SYRIZA's total number of MPs down to 25.
Piraeus B	~~Nina Kasimati~~	On 27 August 2026, she was expelled from the parliamentary group. On 16 November 2026, she joined PASOK.
Attica A	~~Giorgios Karameros~~ until 10 July 2026; ~~Myrto Korovesi~~ from 15 July 2026	On 10 July 2026, Karameros resigned his seat. His seat was taken by Myrto Korovesi, who had joined Democrats – Progressive Centre in 2024 and is not affiliated with Syriza. Since Democrats – Progressive Centre does not form a parliamentary group, she became an independent, reducing Syriza's seats to 20. On 28 July 2026, she departed from Democrats – Progressive Centre. On 22 October 2026, she joined PASOK.
Aetolia-Acarnania	~~Miltos Zamparas~~ until 29 October 2026; ~~Giorgos Varemenos~~ from 2 November 2026	On 17 July 2026, he left the parliamentary group and became an independent. On 29 October 2026, Zamparas resigned his seat. His seat was taken by Giorgos Varemenos, who ceased to be a member of Syriza in 2023.
Argolis	~~Giorgos Gavrilos~~	On 14 July 2026, he left the parliamentary group and became an independent.
Arcadia	Giorgios Papailiou	
Arta	~~Olga Gerovasili~~	On 24 August 2026, she left the parliamentary group and became an independent.
Achaea	~~Andreas Panagiotopoulos~~ until 10 November 2026; Georgios Kyriakopoulos from 13 November 2026	On 14 July 2026, he left the parliamentary group and became an independent. On 10 November 2026, Panagiotopoulos resigned his seat. Georgios Kyriakopoulos replaced him.
Achaea	~~Sia Anagnostopoulou~~	On 23 November 2023, she disagreed with the way the party was being run under Stefanos Kasselakis and became independent.
Boeotia	~~Giota Poulou~~	On 21 November 2024, she announced her independence from Syriza by siding with Stefanos Kasselakis. On 7 July 2026, she departed from Kasselakis' party
Drama	Theofilos Xanthopoulos	
Euboea	~~Simeon Kedikoglou~~ until 20 July 2026; Theodora Akriotou from 24 July 2026	On 20 July 2026, he resigned his seat. Theodora Akriotou replaced him.
Elis	~~Dionysis Kalamatianos~~ until 27 October 2026; Zoe Anastasopoulou from 2 November 2026	On 17 July 2026, he left the parliamentary group and became an independent. On 27 October 2026, Kalamatianos resigned his seat. Zoe Anastasopoulou replaced him.
Ioannina	~~Meropi Tzoufi~~	On 23 November 2023, she disagreed with the way the party was being run under Stefanos Kasselakis and became independent.
Heraklion	~~Haris Mamoulakis~~ unitl 19 October 2026; Sokratis Vardakis from 22 October 2026	On 15 July 2026, he left the parliamentary group and became an independent. On 19 October 2026, Mamoulakis resigned his seat. Sokratis Vardakis replaced him.
Thessaloniki A	~~Katerina Notopoulou~~ unitl 8 July 2026; Ioannis Amanatidis from 13 July 2026	On 8 July 2026, she resigned her seat. Ioannis Amanatidis replaced her.
Thessaloniki A	~~Rania Thraskia~~	On 10 December 2024, she became independent, disagreeing with the way Syriza handled the candidacy of Kasselakis in the internal party elections. On 17 February 2025, she joined PASOK.
Thessaloniki A	Christos Giannoulis	
Thessaloniki B	~~Sokratis Famellos~~	Former President of Syriza; On 22 July 2026, he left the parliamentary group and became an independent.
Corfu	~~Alexandros Avlonitis~~	On 11 November 2024, he announced his independence from Syriza by siding with Stefanos Kasselakis. On 18 September 2026, he joined PASOK.
Kilkis	~~Petros Pappas~~	On 9 November 2024, he announced his independence from Syriza and subsequently joined PASOK in March 2025.
Kozani	~~Calliope Vetta~~	On 16 July 2026, she left the parliamentary group and became an independent.
Corinthia	~~Giorgos Psychogios~~	On 14 July 2026, he left the parliamentary group and became an independent.
Larissa	~~Vasilis Kokkalis~~ until 22 July 2026; Ioannis Karipidis from 24 July 2026	On 22 July 2026, Kokkalis resigned his seat. Ioannis Karipidis replaced him.
Magnesia	~~Alexandros Meikopoulos~~	On 15 July, he left the parliamentary group and became an independent.
Messenia	~~Alexis Haritsis~~	On 23 November 2023, he disagreed with the way the party was being run under Stefanos Kasselakis and became independent.
Xanthi	~~Chousein Zeimpek~~	On 23 November 2023, he disagreed with the way the party was being run under Stefanos Kasselakis and became independent.
Pella	~~Theodora Tzakri~~	On 21 November 2024, she announced her independence from Syriza by siding with Stefanos Kasselakis. On 28 June 2026, she departed from Kasselakis' party.
Preveza	~~Kostas Barkas~~	On 16 July 2026, he left the parliamentary group and became an independent.
Rhodope	~~Ozgkiour Ferchat~~	On 23 November 2023, he disagreed with the way the party was being run under Stefanos Kasselakis and became independent.
Trikala	~~Marina Kontotoli~~	On 15 July 2026, she left the parliamentary group and became an independent.
Phthiotis	~~Yannis Sarakiotis~~	On 28 November 2024, the MP resigned and became an independent in protest to what happened during SYRIZA's internal elections.
Florina	~~Peti Perka~~	On 13 November 2023, she disagreed with the way the party was being run under Stefanos Kasselakis and became independent.
Chalkidiki	~~Kyriaki Malama~~	On 11 November 2024, she announced her independence from Syriza by siding with Stefanos Kasselakis.
Chania	Pavlos Polakis	On 25 July 2024, Polakis was expelled from the parliamentary group. He rejoined on 3 September 2024. He was expelled again on 16 May 2026. On 15 July 2026, he rejoined.

Syriza had been plagued by an internal crisis following the election of a new leadership. The new president had not been accepted by all the party's supporters and MPs, and soon after his election begun resignations from those who disagreed with his political leadership. Most of the resigned MPs later formed the New Left party.
In November 2024, during new internal party elections, there was a new withdrawal of MPs which led to the second split of the party.
On 21 November 2024, due to the large amount of Syriza members leaving the party, it no longer was the 2nd most represented party. Thus, it lost the position of the official opposition, which went to PASOK.

=== Greek Solution ===
Constituency	Full name	Notes
Nationwide	~~Pavlos Sarakis~~	On 18 June 2024, he was expelled from parliamentary group due to disagreements with the Party President on various issues. He refused to resign and became Independent.
Athens A	Vasilis Grammenos	
Athens B1	Vassilis Billiardos	
Athens B2	Maria Athanasiou	
Athens B3	Kyriakos Velopoulos	President of Greek Solution
Piraeus B	Sophia Asimakopoulou	
Attica A	Stelios Fotopoulos	
Evros	Paris Papadakis	
Imathia	Vassilis Kotidis	
Thessaloniki A	Simos Koupeloglou	
Thessaloniki B	Kostas Chitas	
Serres	Kostas Boubas	

=== ~~New Left~~ ===
The party's parliamentary group was dissolved on June 2, 2026.

Constituency	Full name	Notes
Athens A	~~Nasos Iliopoulos~~	On 2 June 2026, he left the parliamentary group and became an independent.
Athens A	~~Dimitris Tzanakopoulos~~	On 2 June 2026, he left the parliamentary group and became an independent.
Athens B1	~~Euclid Tsakalotos~~	On 2 June 2026, due to the dissolution of the party's parliamentary group, he became an independent.
Athens B2	~~Effie Achtsioglou~~ unitl 2 June 2026; ~~Giannis Dragasakis~~ from 8 June 2026	On 2 June 2026, she left the parliamentary group and resigned her seat. Giannis Dragasakis replaced her.
Athens B3	~~Theano Fotiou~~	On 2 June 2026, she left the parliamentary group and became an independent.
Piraeus A	~~Thodoris Dritsas~~	On October 8, 2025, Thodoris Dritsas took his seat as a substitute member of parliament for SYRIZA following Tsipras' resignation. The current MP, who ceased to be a member of SYRIZA in 2023, joined the parliamentary group of the New Left. On 2 June 2026, due to the dissolution of the party's parliamentary group, he became an independent.
Achaea	~~Sia Anagnostopoulou~~	On 2 June 2026, due to the dissolution of the party's parliamentary group, she became an independent.
Ioannina	~~Meropi Tzoufi~~	On 2 June 2026, she left the parliamentary group and became an independent.
Messenia	~~Alexis Haritsis~~	On 2 June 2026, he left the parliamentary group and became an independent.
Xanthi	~~Chousein Zeimpek~~	On 2 June 2026, he left the parliamentary group and became an independent.
Rhodope	~~Ozgkiour Ferchat~~	On 15 May 2026, he became an independent.
Florina	~~Peti Perka~~	On 2 June 2026, due to the dissolution of the party's parliamentary group, she became an independent.

The parliamentary group was created on 4 December 2023 entirely from the members of Syriza who had resigned and/or left the party; therefore, the party has not been voted by the electorate. As a party it was founded on 1 May 2024.

On 2 June 2026, seven New Left MPs departed from the parliamentary group. This was the result of an internal crisis within the party, where they believed it was unable to achieve its political goals. The parliamentary group was dissolved because now it consisted of only four members and did not meet the threshold of ten MPs required to form a parliamentary group.

=== Niki ===
Constituency	Full name	Notes
Nationwide	~~Georgios Apostolakis~~ until 2 December 2024; Athanasios Rakovalis from 4 December 2024	Resigned his seat without explaining why. His place was taken by the first runner-up, Athanasios Rakovalis.
Athens B1	Aspasia Kouroupaki	
Athens B2	Andreas Voryllas	
Athens B3	~~Nikos Vrettos~~	On 27 September 2025, he was expelled from the parliamentary group and became an independent.
Attica A	Tasos Oikonomopoulos	
Achaea	Spyros Tsironis	
Thessaloniki A	Dimitris Natsios	President of the Party and the Parliamentary group
Thessaloniki B	~~Nikos Papadopoulos~~	On 5 May 2025, he was expelled from the parliamentary group as he refused to follow the party line on certain issues.
Larissa	Giorgos Rountas	
Pieria	Komninos Delveroudis	

=== Course of Freedom ===
Constituency	Full name	Notes
Nationwide	Alexandros Kazamias	
Athens A	~~Diamantis Karanastasis~~ until 19 November 2025; Elli Roussou since 24 November 2025	On November 19, 2025, he resigned and was replaced by the runner-up, Elli Roussou.
Athens B1	Zoi Konstantopoulou	Chairman of Course of Freedom & President of the Parliamentary group
Athens B2	Georgia Kefala	
Athens B3	Spyros Mpimpilas	
Attica A	~~Eleni Karageorgopoulou~~	On 10 February 2026, she left the parliamentary group and became independent.
Thessaloniki A	~~Michalis Chourdakis~~	On 11 October 2023, he was expelled from the parliamentary group by decision of the party leader, who considered that he did not correspond to the left-wing principles of the party. He refused to resign and became independent.
Thessaloniki B	~~Areti Papapioannou~~	On 31 October 2023, she left the parliamentary group and became independent. Areti Papaioannou is the mother of Michalis Chourdakis.

=== ~~Spartans~~ ===
The party's parliamentary group was dissolved on June 12, 2025.

Constituency	Full name	Notes
Athens A	~~Thanasis Chalkias~~	On 12 June 2025, due to the dissolution of the party's parliamentary group, he became independent.
Athens A	~~Giannis Dimitrokallis~~	On 31 August 2023, he was expelled from the P.G. On 7 September 2023, he rejoined. On 4 April 2024, he became independent.
Athens B1	~~Haralambos Katsivardas~~	On 31 August 2023, he was expelled from the P.G. On 7 September 2023, he rejoined. On 25 January 2025, he became independent.
Athens B2	~~Giorgos Manousos~~	On 2 September 2023, he became independent. On 7 September 2023, he rejoined. On 4 April 2024, he became independent again.
Athens B3	~~Vasilis Stigkas~~	Founder of Spartans, and former President of the party, and of the Parliamentary Group. On 10 June 2025, he was removed from office, following a decision of the Special Election Court.
Piraeus B	~~Alexandros Zerveas~~	On 10 June 2025, he was removed from office, following a decision of the Special Election Court.
Aetolia-Acarnania	~~Dionissis Valtogiannis~~	On 10 April 2024, he became independent.
Achaea	~~Georgios Aspiotis~~	On 25 June 2024, he became independent.
Thessaloniki A	~~Ioannis Kontis~~	On 31 August 2023 , Kontis was expelled from the parliamentary group. On 7 September 2024, he rejoined. On 12 June 2025, due to the dissolution of the party's parliamentary group, he became independent.
Thessaloniki B	~~Petros Dimitriadis~~	On 10 June 2025, he was removed from office, following a decision of the Special Election Court.
Heraklion	~~Michalis Gavgiotakis~~	On 25 June 2024, he became independent.
Larissa	~~Konstantinos Floros~~	On 3 September 2023, he became independent.

Since August 2023, a prolonged internal party crisis has all but dissolved the Spartiate parliamentary group. The crisis erupted over the support of most of the party's MPs for Ilias Kasidiaris and his candidacy for the Municipality of Athens in the upcoming local elections. Party leader Vasilis Stigkas reacted to these initiatives by his MPs and expelled three of them, referring to MPs led by extra-parliamentary foreign centres acting like the Greek mafia.

Stigkas' allegations prompted a judicial investigation by the Prosecutor of Greece’s Supreme Civil and Criminal Court, leading to the indictment of the entire parliamentary group—except Vasilis Stigkas—for electoral fraud, with Ilias Kasidiaris also charged for instigating the fraud. In May 2025, the Court of Appeal unanimously acquitted all 11 accused MPs, including Kasidiaris, finding no evidence that they had misled voters."
On May 27, the Appeals Prosecutor's Office filed an appeal against the first-instance decision, deeming its reasoning erroneous.

According to a decision by the Supreme Judicial Council, three Spartans MPs were stripped of their office and ceased to be members of the Greek Parliament. This decision was based on the Special Election Court's opinion that these MPs were elected by misleading the electorate, concealing that their true leader and guide was Ilias Kasidiaris. The party's parliamentary group, now consisting of only two members, was dissolved on June 12, 2025, as it fell below the threshold of five MPs required to form a parliamentary group. The two MPs joined the Independents.

=== Independents ===
Constituency	Full name	From
Nationwide	Pavlos Sarakis	Greek Solution
Nationwide	Popi Tsapanidou	Syriza
Athens A	Nasos Iliopoulos	New Left
Athens A	Dimitris Tzanakopoulos	New Left
Athens A	Thanasis Chalkias	Spartans
Athens B1	Charalambos Katsivardas	Spartans
Athens B1	Athina Linou	Syriza
Athens B1	Euclid Tsakalotos	New Left
Athens B2	Giannis Dragasakis	Syriza
Athens B2	Giorgos Manousos	Spartans
Athens B3
Athens B3	Nikos Vrettos	Niki
Athens B3	Theano Fotiou	New Left
Athens B3	Rallia Christidou	Syriza
Attica A	Ioannis Dimitrokallis	Spartans
Attica A	Eleni Karageorgopoulou	Course of Freedom
Aetolia-Acarnania	Dionysis Valtogiannis	Spartans
Aetolia-Acarnania	Giorgos Varemenos	Syriza
Aetolia-Acarnania	Marios Salmas	New Democracy
Arta	Olga Gerovasili	Syriza
Achaea	Sia Anagnostopoulou	New Left
Achaea	Georgios Aspiotis	Spartans
Achaea	Giorgos Gavrilos	Syriza
Boeotia	Giota Poulou	Syriza
Heraklion	Michalis Gavgiotakis	Spartans
Thessaloniki A	Ioannis Kontis	Spartans
Thessaloniki B	Nikos Papadopoulos	Niki
Thessaloniki B	Areti Papaioannou	Course of Freedom
Thessaloniki B	Sokratis Famellos	Syriza
Ioannina	Meropi Tzoufi	New Left
Kozani	Calliope Vetta	Syriza
Corinthia	Giorgos Psychogios	Syriza
Larissa	Konstandinos Floros	Spartans
Lesbos	Panagiotis Paraskevaidis	PASOK
Magnesia	Alexandros Meikopoulos	Syriza
Messenia	Antonis Samaras	New Democracy
Messenia	Alexis Haritsis	New Left
Xanthi	Chousein Zeimpek	New Left
Xanthi	Mpourchan Mparan	PASOK
Piraeus A	Thodoris Dritsas	New Left
Pella	Theodora Tzakri	Syriza
Preveza	Kostas Barkas	Syriza
Phthiotis	Yannis Sarakiotis	Syriza
Rhodope	Ozgkiour Ferchat	New Left
Trikala	Marina Kontotoli	Syriza
Florina	Peti Perka	New Left
Chalkidiki	Kyriaki Malama	Syriza

== See also ==
- June 2023 Greek legislative election
- Second Cabinet of Kyriakos Mitsotakis

== Note ==
^a The parliamentary terms are numbered in consecutive order from 1975, with Greek numbering.
