= Democrats – Progressive Centre =

Greek political party

Democrats – Progressive Centre Δημοκράτες – Προοδευτικό Κέντρο
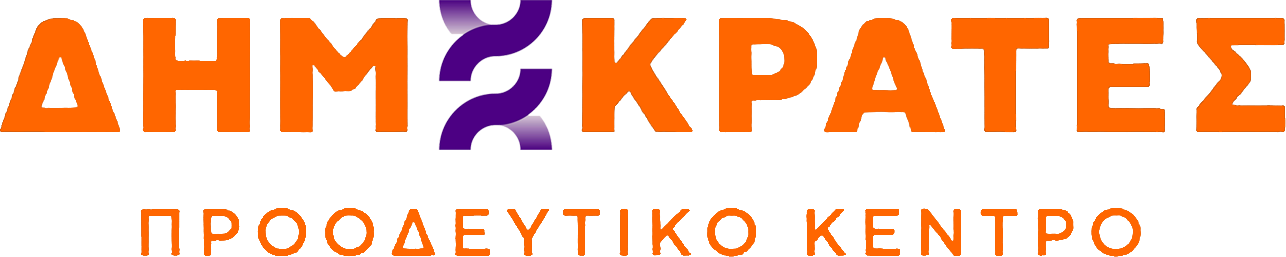
- President: Stefanos Kasselakis
- Founder: Stefanos Kasselakis
- Founded: 23 November 2024; 23 months ago
- Split from: SYRIZA
- Headquarters: Vasilissis Amalias Avenue, Athens
- Membership: 35,000
- Ideology: Pro-Europeanism
- Political position: Centre
- European affiliation: European Democratic Party
- Colours: Orange; Purple

Website
- democrats-pc.gr

Democrats – Progressive Centre (Greek: Δημοκράτες – Προοδευτικό Κέντρο, romanized: Dimokrates – Proodeftiko Kentro) formerly Movement for Democracy (Greek: Κίνημα Δημοκρατίας, romanized: Kínima Dimokratías), is a political party formed in Greece on 23 November 2024 by the former leader of Syriza, Stefanos Kasselakis after the party's extraordinary congress refused to approve his candidacy in the internal elections. The party's founding declaration was signed by, among others, five independent MPs, formerly members of the Syriza parliamentary group.

== History ==
=== Syriza and Kasselakis ===
Following Syriza's disappointing performance in the May and June 2023 legislative elections, Alexis Tsipras, its long-time leader, stood down from his position. In the following leadership election, Kasselakis as an outsider candidate was elected to succeed Tsipras. Kasselakis set about moving the party towards the centre, a controversial move which led to several figures leaving Syriza and the formation of party splits, including New Left.

Internally, Syriza faced a crisis when key officials of central committee of the party attempted and succeeded to oust Kasselakis as party leader on accusations of "autocratic behavior". Kasselakis attempted to stand as a candidate in the new leadership election but was barred.

=== New party ===
Following his expulsion from Syriza, Stefanos Kasselakis announced the creation of a new political initiative. Initially unnamed, he opened the party's name to a public vote. On 23 November 2024, he unveiled the party’s name as "Kínima Dimokratías" (transl.: Movement for Democracy)

In April 2025, the party formalized its internal structures in preparation for elections later that month. It also expressed its intent to join the European Democratic Party (EDP). A proposal for membership was submitted to party members for an internal vote on 8–9 April. On 10 April, Kínima Dimokratías officially joined the EDP.

In May 2025, the party held elections for its presidency. Kasselakis faced a challenge from Elias Michalakopoulos, a fellow party member. Kasselakis secured the presidency with 96.8% of the vote. The party joined the European Democratic Party in 2025, and adopted its current name in 2026.

== Affiliated members of parliament ==
The party has stated its intention to form an official parliamentary group, which would require a minimum of ten MPs. There is currently one party member who sits as an independent in the Hellenic Parliament. The independent MP Evangelos Apostolakis was associated with the party after leaving Syriza, but has not joined it formally.

Name	Constituency	Former party	Joined	Notes	Ref.
Rallia Christidou	Athens B3	Syriza	23 September 2024		

Furthermore, several MPs have formerly affiliated themselves with the party.

Name	Constituency	Former party	Period	Notes	Ref.
Myrto Korovesi	East Attica	Syriza	2024–2026	Vice president	
Giota Poulou	Boeotia	Syriza	2024–2026		
Michalis Chourdakis	Thessaloniki A	Course of Freedom	2025–2026	Press spokesperson (Note: Chourdakis attempted to resign from the party and his position on 30 January 2025 surrounding his position on the Prespa Agreement, but his resignation was rejected by Kasselakis.)	
Alexandros Avlonitis	Corfu	Syriza	2024–2026		
Theodora Tzakri	Pella	Syriza	2024–2026		
Kyriaki Malama	Chalkidiki	Syriza	2024–2025		
