= Rallia Christidou =

Greek politician and singer (born 1979)

Member of the Greek Parliament for Athens B3

20th session (currently as Independent)
- Incumbent
- Assumed office July 2023

19th session
- In office May 2023 – July 2023

18th session
- In office July 2019 – April 2023

Personal details
- Born: 14 November 1979 (age 46) Neo Irakleio, Athens, Greece
- Party: Democrats – Progressive Centre (2024–present); Syriza (2011–2024)
- Profession: musician

Rallia Christidou (Greek: Ραλλία Χρηστίδου, pronounced [raˈlia xrisˈtiðu]) is a Greek politician and a former singer. Christidou became known to the wider public through her participation in the television reality singing show Fame Story in 2004 where she took second place behind the winner Kalomoira. She then released eight albums between 2004 and 2013.

From 2011 and the outbreak of the economic crisis in Greece, Christidou began to participate in public life by joining the Greek political party Syriza, and in 2015 she was a Syriza candidate for member of parliament (MP) in the Athens B2 constituency of Athens. She was first elected MP with Syriza in the Athens B3 constituency in the 2019 parliamentary elections, and was re-elected in both the May 2023 and June 2023 parliamentary elections.

On 11 November 2024, during the elections for new leadership, Christidou announced her resignation from the party and her independence as an MP, denouncing the procedures followed for the election of a new party president. On 24 November, she became a member of the Movement for Democracy party and was a signatory to its founding declaration. The party was renamed Democrats – Progressive Centre in 2026.

== Discography ==
- Mi mou les antio (Μη μου λές αντίο) (OST) (2004)
- Me to vlemma tis kardias (Με το βλέμμα της καρδιάς) (2005)
- Gia tin Anna (Για την Άννα) (OST) (2006)
- Ena hadi zesto (Ένα χάδι ζεστό) (2007)
- Mono mia nihta Live (Μόνο μια νύχτα Live) (2008)
- Etoimi (Έτοιμη) (2009)
- Stin apenanti plevra (Στην απέναντι πλευρά) (2012)
- Me oplo tin agapi (Με όπλο την αγάπη) (2013)
