= Ioannina (constituency) =

Parliamentary constituency of Greece

- Electoral constituency for the Hellenic Parliament
- Ioannina within Greece
- Regional units: Ioannina
- Administrative region: Epirus
- Population: 175,097 (2011)

Current constituency
- Created: 2012
- Number of members: 5

The Ioannina electoral constituency (Greek: περιφέρεια Ιωαννίνων) is a parliamentary constituency of Greece. It elects 5 MPs to the Hellenic Parliament.

== Members ==
=== June 2023 ===
MP	Party
~~Konstantinos Tasoulas~~ since 20 January 2025 Giorgos Amiras from 20 January 2025	New Democracy
Maria Kefala	New Democracy
Nikolaos Panagiotopoulos	New Democracy
Giannis Tsimaris	PASOK
~~Meropi Tzoufi~~	Syriza
Pacos Exarchos	Communist
Meropi Tzoufi	New Left

== See also ==
- List of parliamentary constituencies of Greece
