= Spyros Koulkoudinas =

Greek politician

Spyros Koulkoudinas (Greek: Σπύρος Κουλκουδίνας) is a Greek politician from New Democracy. In the June 2023 Greek legislative election he was elected to the Greek parliament representing Pieria constituency.

== See also ==
- List of members of the Hellenic Parliament, June 2023
