= Katerina Papakosta-Palioura =

Greek lawyer and politician (born 1973)

- Κατερίνα Παπακώστα-Παλιούρα

Deputy Minister of Social Cohesion and Family
- In office 14 June 2024 – 15 March 2025
- Prime Minister: Kyriakos Mitsotakis
- Minister: Sofia Zacharaki
- Preceded by: Maria-Alexandra Kefala
- Succeeded by: Elena Rapti

Member of the Hellenic Parliament
- Incumbent
- Assumed office 3 July 2023
- Constituency: Trikala

Member of the Hellenic Parliament
- In office 17 July 2019 – 22 April 2023
- Constituency: Trikala

Personal details
- Born: Aikaterini Papakosta-Palioura; 29 November 1973 (age 52) Eksjö, Sweden
- Party: New Democracy
- Children: 1
- Education: Aristotle University of Thessaloniki; University of West Attica
- Occupation: Lawyer
- Website: www.papakostakaterina.gr

Aikaterini "Katerina" Papakosta-Palioura (Greek: Αικατερίνη «Κατερίνα» Παπακώστα-Παλιούρα; born 29 November 1973) is a Greek lawyer and politician of New Democracy. She represented Trikala in the Hellenic Parliament from July 2019 to April 2023 and has again served as an MP for the constituency since July 2023. From June 2024 to March 2025, she served as Deputy Minister of Social Cohesion and Family in the Second Cabinet of Kyriakos Mitsotakis.

== Early life, education and legal career ==
Papakosta-Palioura was born in Eksjö, Sweden, and grew up in Trikala. Her family originates from Gavros, near Kalabaka, where she attended primary school. She graduated from the 4th General Lyceum of Trikala and studied at the Law School of the Aristotle University of Thessaloniki. She later earned a master's degree in Public Administration and Public Management from the Department of Business Administration of the University of West Attica.

She has practised law in Trikala since 1998 and is qualified to appear before the Court of Cassation. She is also a founding member of the Trikala Reflection Club.

== Political career ==
=== Local government and early parliamentary candidacies ===
Papakosta-Palioura first stood for elected office in 1998, at the age of 25, as a candidate for the Trikala Prefectural Council on the slate led by Kostas Georgoliou. In the 2002 local elections, she was elected as a prefectural councillor on the slate led by Ilias Vlahogiannis and was its only elected woman.

She stood as a New Democracy candidate in the Trikala constituency in the 2004, 2007 and 2009 parliamentary elections, but was not elected.

=== Hellenic Parliament ===
In the parliamentary election of 7 July 2019, Papakosta-Palioura was elected to the Hellenic Parliament for the first time. New Democracy won three of the constituency's four seats, which were taken, in order of preference votes, by Kostas Skrekas, Thanasis Lioutas and Papakosta-Palioura.

During the 2019–2023 parliamentary term, she served on preliminary investigative committees concerning the Novartis case and the television-licensing case, as well as on committees dealing with constitutional revision, equality, educational affairs, research and technology, and the prison system. She was New Democracy's lead rapporteur on the parliamentary committee of inquiry into state funding for news media and polling companies. She also served as rapporteur on bills concerning university admissions and campus security, school violence, and copyright, and chaired the Greece–Sweden Parliamentary Friendship Group.

In the May 2023 parliamentary election, Papakosta-Palioura received 10,876 preference votes and ranked third among New Democracy candidates in Trikala. She was not elected because the party won only one of the constituency's four seats. She returned to Parliament following the 25 June 2023 election, in which New Democracy won three seats in Trikala.

During the parliamentary term beginning in 2023, she served as secretary of the Standing Committee on Public Administration, Public Order and Justice and as a member of committees on social affairs, economic affairs, equality and the prison system, as well as the subcommittee on issues affecting people with disabilities. She was vice-chair of the parliamentary inquiry into the Tempi train crash and New Democracy's rapporteur on justice ministry bills concerning terrorist content online and the consolidation of first-instance jurisdiction.

=== Deputy Minister of Social Cohesion and Family ===
In a cabinet reshuffle on 14 June 2024, Papakosta-Palioura was appointed Deputy Minister of Social Cohesion and Family, succeeding Maria-Alexandra Kefala and serving under minister Sofia Zacharaki. During her tenure, she took part in ministry initiatives on gender equality and measures addressing gender-based and domestic violence. In September 2024, she presented a study by the Research Centre for Gender Equality on online violence against young women at the Thessaloniki International Fair.

Her tenure ended in the March 2025 cabinet reshuffle. On 15 March, Elena Rapti was sworn in as her successor, while Domna Michailidou became Minister of Social Cohesion and Family.

== OPEKEPE case ==
In April 2026, a case file compiled by the European Public Prosecutor's Office (EPPO) concerning OPEKEPE, the Greek agency responsible for administering agricultural subsidies, was transmitted to the Hellenic Parliament. It included telephone conversations between Papakosta-Palioura and the agency's then-president, Dimitris Melas. The calls, made in 2021, concerned a livestock farmer from Trikala, changes to information in the Veterinary Database and his eligibility for agricultural support. According to the EPPO report as quoted in the press, the alleged interventions were linked to changes in the database and an unlawful financial outcome.

Papakosta-Palioura denied pressuring officials, issuing an instruction or requesting unlawful treatment. She said that she had forwarded in good faith what she regarded as a reasonable request from a livestock farmer so that it could be examined by the competent authorities, and she asked Parliament to lift her immunity. On 22 April 2026, the Hellenic Parliament voted to lift her immunity, together with that of twelve other MPs named in EPPO case files concerning OPEKEPE.

On 16 July 2026, the EPPO brought misdemeanor criminal charges against her. According to press reports, the charges concerned alleged instigation of breach of trust, unlawful management of European Union funds, false certification and attempted computer fraud. Papakosta-Palioura maintained that she was innocent, described the prosecution as unjust, unfounded and legally unsupported, and requested an expedited trial.

== Personal life ==
Papakosta-Palioura is married and has one daughter.
