= Stamatis Poulis =

Greek politician

Stamatis Poulis (Greek: Εκτός Βουλής) is a Greek politician from New Democracy who was elected to the Hellenic Parliament from West Attica in the June 2023 Greek legislative election.

== Career ==
Poulis holds degrees from the University of London and the University of Athens.

Poulis was head of the trade union for workers in the Greek Center for Disease Control and Prevention.

== See also ==
- List of members of the Hellenic Parliament, June 2023
