= Spyros Kyriakis =

Greek politician

Spyros Kyriakis (Greek: Σπύρος Κυριάκης) is a Greek politician from New Democracy. In the June 2023 Greek legislative election he was elected to the Greek parliament representing Preveza constituency.

== See also ==
- List of members of the Hellenic Parliament, June 2023
