= Alexandros Avlonitis =

Greek politician

Member of the Hellenic Parliament for Corfu

20th session
- Incumbent
- Assumed office July 2023

19th session
- In office May 2023 – July 2023

18th session
- In office July 2019 – April 2023

Personal details
- Born: 9 May 1956 (age 70) Corfu, Greece
- Party: PASOK – Movement for Change (2026–present); Democrats – Progressive Centre (2024–2026); Syriza (until 2024)
- Children: 1
- Education: Democritus University of Thrace
- Occupation: Lawyer

Alexandros Avlonitis (Greek: Αλέξανδρος Αυλωνίτης; born 9 May 1956) is a Greek politician who is a member of the Hellenic Parliament, representing the Corfu constituency.

== Biography ==
Avlonitis was born in the village of Dafni on the island of Corfu. He graduated from Democritus University of Thrace with a BA in Law and has practised law since 1983. From 2007 to 2010, he was the final mayor of the municipality of Esperies before it was merged into the municipality of Corfu.

He was first elected as an MP in the 2019 elections with Syriza and was re-elected in May and June 2023.
In November 2024, in the midst of the crisis that erupted during the internal elections for the party's presidency, he resigned and became an independent. After a few days he joined the new party of Stefanos Kasselakis, Movement for Democracy as one of the founding members. On 29 January 2026, he announced his departure from the Democracy Movement and returned to being an independent.

On September 18, 2026, he joined PASOK – Movement for Change.

He is married to notary Anastasia Konstantara, with whom he has a daughter.
