= Vassilis Spanakis =

Greek politician

Vassilis Spanakis is a Greek politician from New Democracy. He was elected to the Hellenic Parliament from Athens B3 in the June 2023 Greek legislative election.

Spanakis was immediately appointed Deputy Minister of Labour and Social Security in the Second Cabinet of Kyriakos Mitsotakis.

== See also ==
- List of members of the Hellenic Parliament, June 2023
