= Domna Michailidou =

Greek economist and politician (born 1987)

- Δόμνα Μιχαηλίδου

Minister of Social Cohesion and Family Affairs
- Incumbent
- Assumed office 15 March 2025
- Prime Minister: Kyriakos Mitsotakis
- Preceded by: Sofia Zacharaki

Minister for Labour and Social Security
- In office 4 January 2024 – 14 June 2024
- Prime Minister: Kyriakos Mitsotakis
- Preceded by: Adonis Georgiadis
- Succeeded by: Niki Kerameus

Deputy Minister for Education, Religious Affairs and Sport
- In office 27 June 2023 – 4 January 2024
- Prime Minister: Kyriakos Mitsotakis
- Succeeded by: Ioanna Lytrivi

Deputy Minister for Labour and Social Affairs
- In office 9 July 2019 – 26 May 2023

Member of the Hellenic Parliament
- Incumbent
- Assumed office 21 May 2023
- Constituency: Piraeus A

Personal details
- Born: 13 November 1987 (age 38) Piraeus, Greece
- Party: New Democracy
- Education: Athens College; University of York; University of Cambridge
- Website: domna.gr

Domna Maria Michailidou (Greek: Δόμνα Μιχαηλίδου; born 13 November 1987) is a Greek economist and a Member of Parliament for Piraeus with the New Democracy party. She currently serves as Minister of Social Cohesion and Family Affairs in the Second Cabinet of Kyriakos Mitsotakis. Upon assuming office, she became the first Greek woman to hold a ministerial position while pregnant.

She has previously held the positions of Minister of Labour and Social Security (2024), Deputy Minister of Education, Religious Affairs and Sports (2023–2024), and Deputy Minister of Labour and Social Affairs (2019–2023).

== Biography ==
Michailidou is an academic economist working on economic development, financial crises and public finances. She was previously an adviser to New Democracy leader Kyriakos Mitsotakis on issues related to structural reforms, macroeconomic growth and financial markets.

Since 2014, Michailidou has also been a lecturer in the Centre of Development Studies, University of Cambridge where she teaches topics related to finance and development, private and public debt and government regulation. She has worked for the OECD in Paris and Athens as an economist and a competition expert. Michailidou has also taught at the Judge Business School, University of Cambridge and University College London's School of Public Policy. She has advised governmental and non-governmental institutions such as the UNDP, the FAO, the British Council, the Ministry of Health in Iran and others.

Her book, The Inexorable Evolution of Financialisation: Financial Crises in Emerging Markets, was published by Palgrave MacMillan in 2016. Her work has also appeared in academic journals, institutional reports and the popular press. She holds an MPhil and a PhD in Financial and Development Economics from the University of Cambridge.

== Political career ==
Domna Michailidou served various ministerial posts and was elected Member of Parliament in the elections of June 2023 (Piraeus A) with New Democracy.

Οn 8 July 2019, Domna Michailidou served as the Deputy Minister of Labour and Social Affairs, a post she would hold until 25 May 2023. From 27 June 2023 until 4 January 2024, she served as Deputy Minister of Education, Religious Affairs and Sports. On 4 January 2024, she served briefly as Minister for Labour and Social Welfare until 14 June 2024.

Since 15 March 2025, she serves as Minister for Social Cohesion and Family Affairs in the Second Cabinet of Kyriakos Mitsotakis. Upon assuming office, she became the first Greek woman to hold a ministerial position while pregnant.

== Works ==
- Michailidou D.M. 'Financial Crises in Emerging Markets: The destabilising effects of sudden surges of capital inflows and the inexorable evolution of financialisation', Palgrave Macmillan, published in November 2015. Foreword by G. Harcourt.
- Kennedy J. and D.M. Michailidou, 2017, 'Divergent Policy Responses to Increasing Vaccine Skepticism in Southern Europe', The Lancet Infectious Diseases.
- Kennedy J. and D.M. Michailidou, 2017, 'Civil war, contested sovereignty and the limits of global health partnerships: A case study of the Syrian polio outbreak in 2013', Health Policy and Planning, Oxford University Press.
- Bowden S., Michailidou D.M. and Pereira A., 2008, 'Chasing Mosquitoes: An exploration of the relationship between economic growth, poverty and the elimination of malaria in Southern Europe in the 20th Century' published in the Journal of International Development (Vol. 20, issue 8).
- Domna Michailidou and Jonathan Kennedy (2017). "When Populism can Kill," Project Syndicate
- Jonathan Kennedy and Domna Michailidou (2016). "Rethinking Humanitarian Aid in Civil Wars," Project Syndicate
- Jonathan Kennedy and Domna Michailidou (2016): "The politics of polio eradication," Project Syndicate [Translated into 7 languages and republished in a variety of newspapers including: El Pais (Spain), L'Orient le Jour (Lebanon), Gulf Times (Qatar), Al Shabiba (Oman), Al Bayan and Khaleej Times (United Arab Emirates), Arab News (Saudi Arabia), Le Quotidien d'Oran (Algeria), The Reporter (Ethiopia), Mareeg (Somalia), Outlook Afghanistan (Afghanistan), Postimees (Estonia), Financial Mirror (Cyprus), Khmer Times (Cambodia), AZERNEWS (Azerbaijan), Expreso (Ecuador)]

Political offices
Preceded by Adonis Georgiadis	Minister for Labour and Social Security; 2024–present	Incumbent
