= Ireni Agapidaki =

Greek politician

Irene Agapidaki
- Ειρήνη Αγαπηδάκη
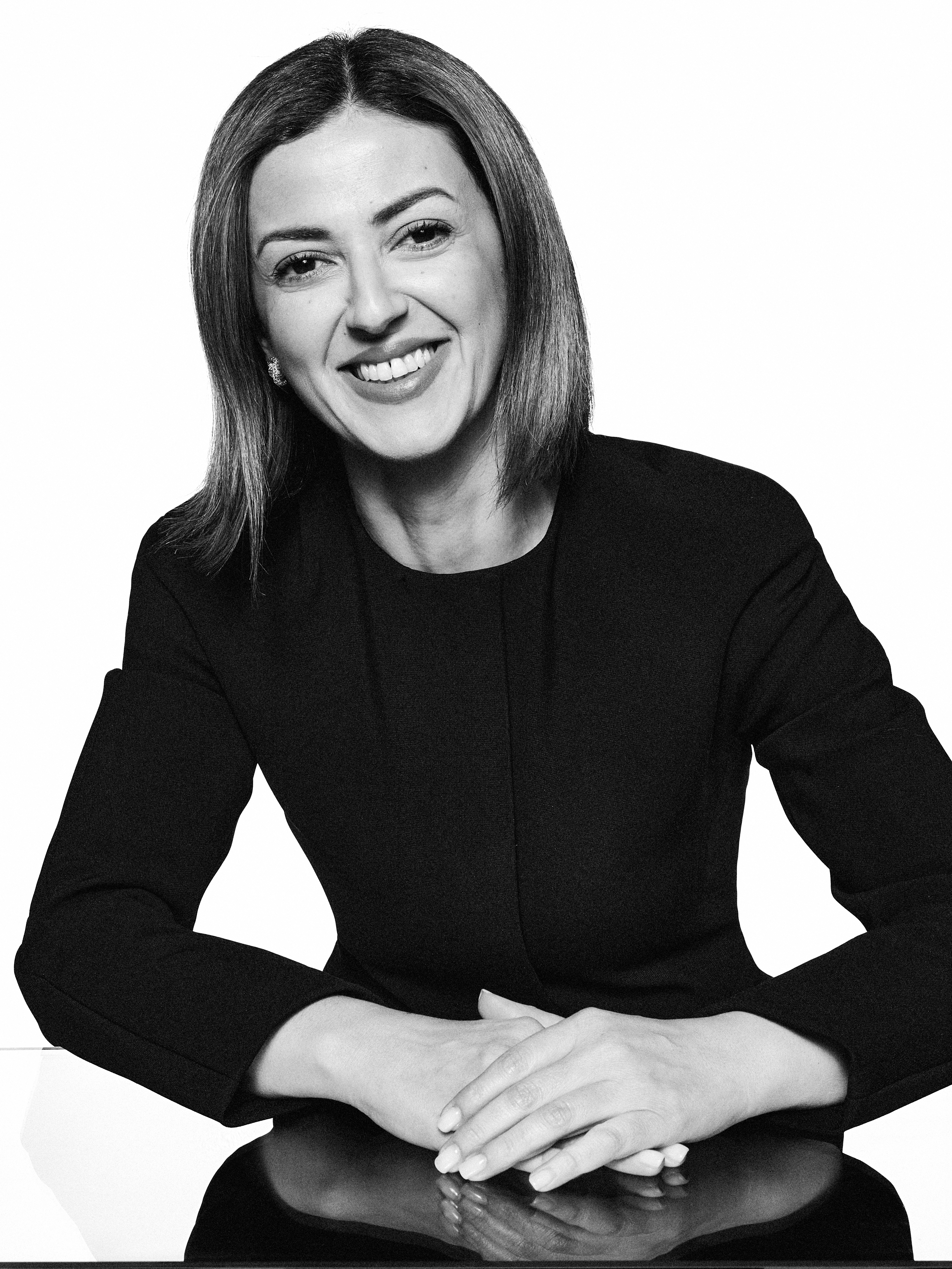

Deputy Minister of Health
- Incumbent
- Assumed office 4 July 2023
- Prime Minister: Kyriakos Mitsotakis
- Minister: Adonis Georgiadis

Member of the Hellenic Parliament
- Incumbent
- Assumed office 25 June 2023

Personal details
- Born: 1979 (age 46–47) Heraklion, Greece
- Citizenship: Greece
- Party: New Democracy
- Education: National and Kapodistrian University of Athens
- Profession: politician psychologist

Irene Agapidaki is a Greek politician and psychologist, who is currently Deputy Minister of Health. In the parliamentary elections of 2023, she headed the New Democracy's State Election ticket, where she was elected Member of Parliament. In 2019 she was appointed Special Secretary for the Protection of Unaccompanied Minors and in 2021 Secretary General of Public Health.

Irini Agapidaki studied psychology and subsequently obtained a Master's degree in Health Promotion and Health Education and a PhD in Health Psychology from the University of Athens Medical School. She participated in many projects for the promotion of mental health and public health and was a collaborator of the Laboratory of Hygiene, Epidemiology and Medical Statistics of the Athens Medical School. He also served as Lecturer in Public Health at the Faculty of Medicine of the European University Cyprus.

In 2019, she took up the position of Special Secretary for the Protection of Unaccompanied Minors at the Ministry of Immigration and Asylum. In 2021, she assumed the position of Secretary General of Public Health, taking over the organization of the examinations carried out through EOPYY, such as the "Spyros Doxiadis" and "Fofi Gennimata" programs and the digital children's booklet. She was appointed head of the New Democracy's state electoral list for the 2023 parliamentary elections by Prime Minister Kyriakos Mitsotakis. After the elections, she was appointed deputy minister of health and was sworn in on 4 July 2023.

== See also ==
- List of members of the Hellenic Parliament, June 2023
