= Giorgos Stamatis =

Greek politician (born 1975)

Giorgos Stamatis (born 1975 in Athens) is a Greek politician from New Democracy. He was elected to the Hellenic Parliament from the National List in the June 2023 Greek legislative election.

He is part of the Group of the European People's Party since September 10th, 2023.

== Political career ==
Stamatis was formerly General Secretary of Social Solidarity & Combating Poverty.

In addition to his role in parliament, Stamatis has been serving as a member of the Greek delegation to the Parliamentary Assembly of the Council of Europe (PACE) since 2023. In this capacity, he has been the Assembly's General Rapporteur on Roma and Travellers and a member of its Committee on Equality and Non-Discrimination (since 2025); the Committee on Social Affairs, Health and Sustainable Development (since 2023); and the Sub-Committee on Disability, Multiple and Intersectional Discrimination (since 2023).

== See also ==
- List of members of the Hellenic Parliament, June 2023
