= Sofia Zacharaki =

Greek teacher and politician

- Σοφία Ζαχαράκη
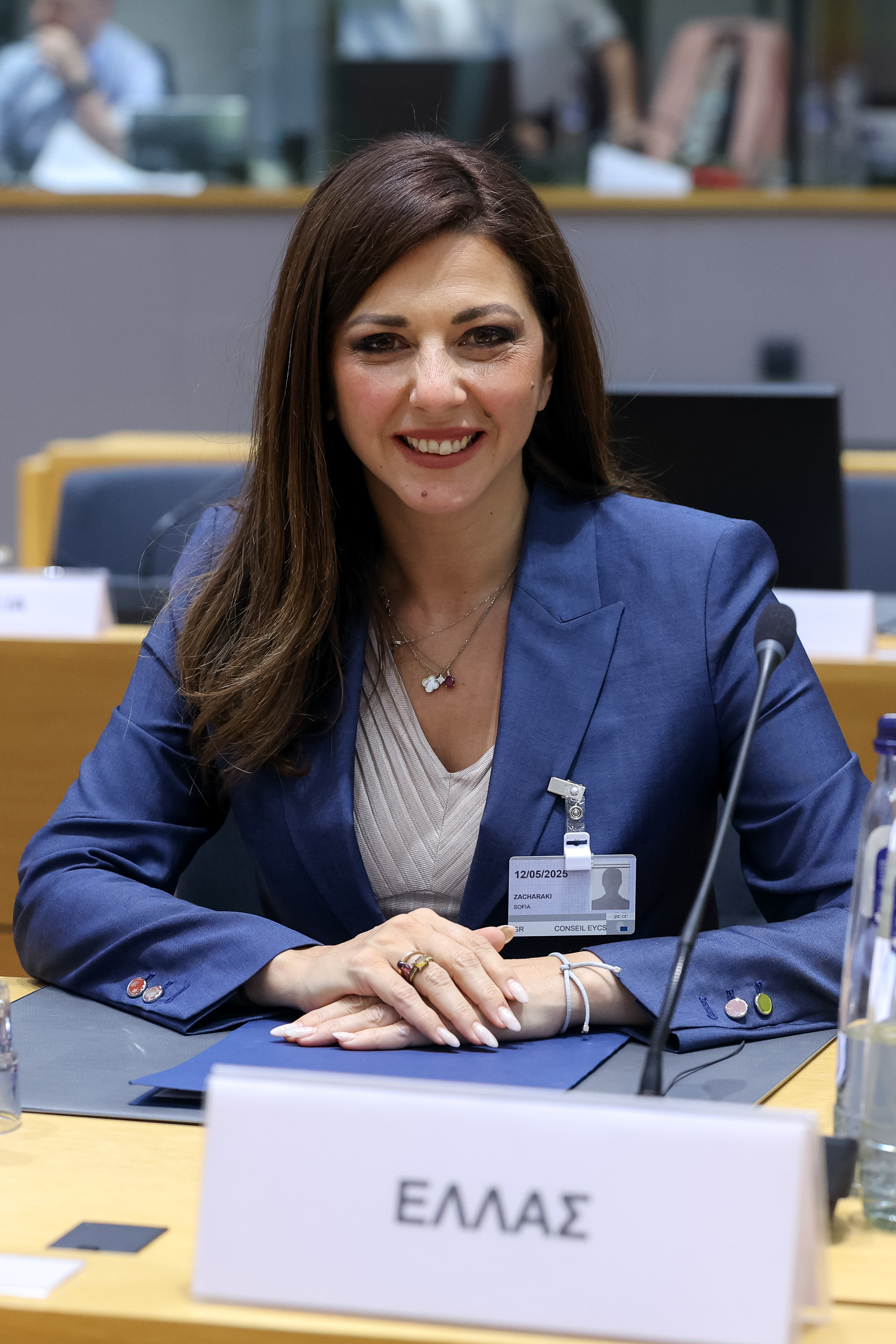
- Zacharaki in 2025

Minister of Education and Religious Affairs
- Incumbent
- Assumed office 15 March 2025
- Prime Minister: Kyriakos Mitsotakis
- Preceded by: Kyriakos Pierrakakis

Minister of Social Cohesion and Family
- In office 27 June 2023 – 15 March 2025
- Succeeded by: Domna Michailidou

Deputy Minister of Tourism
- In office January 4, 2021 – May 26, 2023
- Preceded by: Manos Konsolas

Deputy Minister of Education and Religious Affairs
- In office July 9, 2019 – January 4, 2021
- Preceded by: Meropi Tzoufi
- Succeeded by: Zetta Makri

New Democracy Spokesperson
- In office March 29, 2019 – July 9, 2019
- Preceded by: Maria Spyraki
- Succeeded by: Tasos Gaitanis

Personal details
- Born: 1 September 1976 (age 50) Athens, Greece
- Party: New Democracy
- Education: National and Kapodistrian University of Athens
- Website: sofiazacharaki.gr

Sofia Ilia Zacharaki (born 1 September 1976) is a Greek politician who currently serves as Minister of Education and Religious Affairs in the Second Cabinet of Kyriakos Mitsotakis.

== Biography ==
She was born in Athens on 1 September 1976, originally from Granitsa, Evrytania. Her father was a theologian teacher in secondary education.

She studied English Philology at the Department of English Language and Philology of the School of Philosophy of the National and Kapodistrian University of Athens and did postgraduate studies in Comparative Pedagogy and Administration of European Educational Organizations at the National and Kapodistrian University.

She specializes in English language teaching at the University of London's Institute of Education. In the past, she had worked in public and private vocational schools and in public and private schools. She worked for the Ministry of Education in the European Union and the Secretariat for Lifelong Learning and Youth.

In 2015, she represented Greece in the IVLP (International Visitor Leadership Program), as a fellow of the United States Department of State, on "the role of Public-Private Partnerships in the reconstruction of Finance."

She speaks English, French and Spanish.

== Politics ==
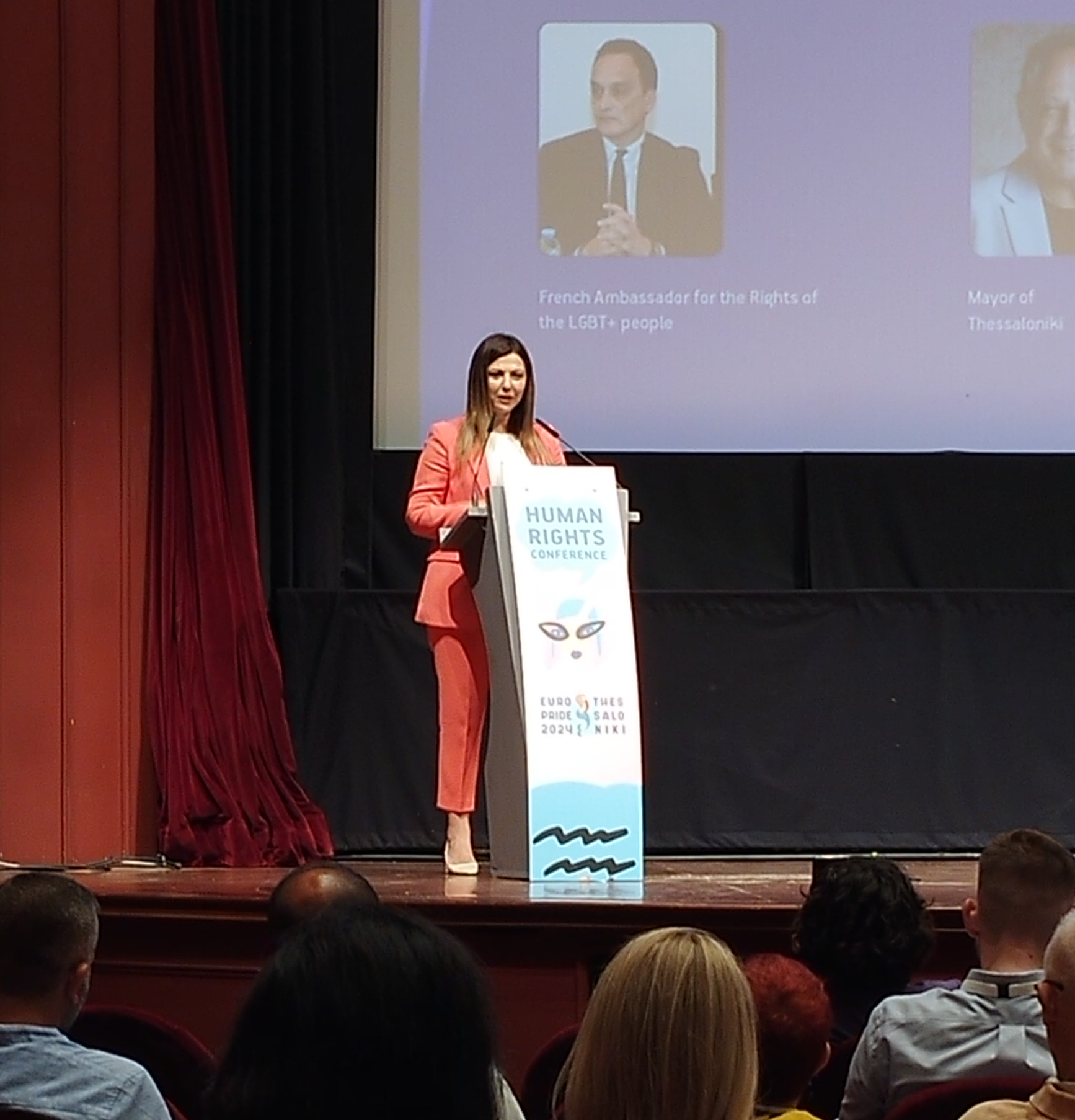
Sofia Zacharaki at EuroPride 2024 in Thessaloniki as speaker on the Human Rights Conference

She served as Advisor to the Minister for International and European Relations at the Ministry of Development from 2012 to 2014.

In August 2016, she was appointed Deputy Spokesperson of New Democracy, while in March 2019, she was appointed Spokesperson of New Democracy.

On July 9, 2019, she was appointed Deputy Minister of Education and Religious Affairs, responsible for primary and secondary education, in the government of Kyriakos Mitsotakis.

On January 4, 2021, she was appointed Deputy Minister of Tourism in charge of Tourism Education and Special Forms of Tourism.

In July 2023 she was appointed Minister of Social Cohesion and Family Affairs.

She was elected to the Greek Parliament in the June 2023 Greek legislative election representing East Attica.
