= West Attica (constituency) =

Parliamentary constituency of Greece

Location within Greece and Attica

West Attica is a constituency of the Hellenic Parliament.

== Election Results ==
=== Parliamentary ===
2000

2004

2007

2009

5/2012

6/2012

1/2015

9/2015

2019

5/2023

6/2023

=== European ===
2009

2014

2019

2024

== Members of Parliament ==
=== June 2023 ===
Full name	Party
George Kotsiras	New Democracy
Thanasis Bouras	New Democracy
Evangelos Liakos	New Democracy
Stamatis Poulis	New Democracy

=== 2019 ===
Full name	Party
Athanasios Bouras	New Democracy
George Kotsiras	New Democracy
Vangelis Liakos	New Democracy
Giorgos Tsipras	New Democracy

== See also ==
- List of parliamentary constituencies of Greece
