= Popi Tsapanidou =

Greek television journalist

- Πόπη Τσαπανίδου
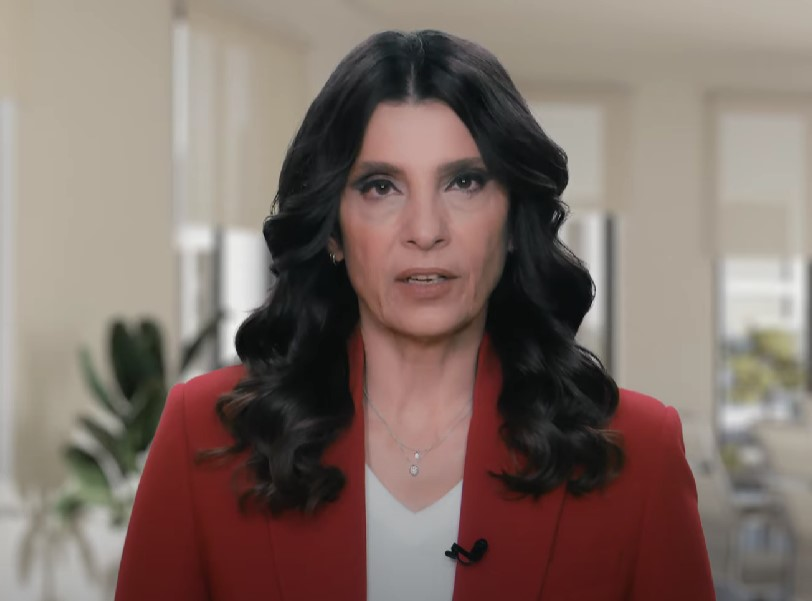
- Tsapanidou in 2023

Press Representative of Syriza
- In office 1 January 2023 – 6 July 2023
- President: Alexis Tsipras
- Preceded by: Nasos Iliopoulos
- Succeeded by: Stergios Kalpakis

Personal details
- Born: Thessaloniki, Greece
- Party: Syriza (2023–2026)
- Children: 3
- Occupation: Politician; Journalist

Popi Tsapanidou (Greek: Πόπη Τσαπανίδου; born Parthena Tsapanidou) is a Greek politician who served as the press representative of SYRIZA from January to July 2023. From 2021 to 2022 she was presenting the central newscast on Open TV. Tsapanidou previously worked for ANT1 and she owns the lifestyle website ipop.gr.
