= Michalis Livanos =

Greek politician

Michalis Livanos (Greek: Μιχάλης Λιβανός) is a Greek politician from New Democracy who was elected to the Hellenic Parliament from Piraeus B in the June 2023 Greek legislative election.

== See also ==
- List of members of the Hellenic Parliament, June 2023
