= Giorgos Gavrilos =

Greek politician (born 1969)

- Γιώργος Γαβρήλος

Member of the Parliament of Greece
- Incumbent
- Assumed office 2023
- Constituency: Argolis

Personal details
- Born: 1969 (age 56–57) Nafplio, Greece
- Party: Syriza

Giorgos Gavrilos (born 1969) is a Greek politician who is a member of the Hellenic Parliament.

== See also ==
- List of members of the Hellenic Parliament, June 2023
