= Ioanna Lytrivi =

Greek politician (born 1982)

Ioanna Lytrivi (Greek: Ιωάννα Λυτρίβη; born 22 August 1982) is a Greek politician from New Democracy. She was elected to the Hellenic Parliament from the National List in the June 2023 Greek legislative election, after contesting Arcadia constituency.

On 4 January 2024 she was appointed Deputy Minister at the Ministry of Education, Religious Affairs and Sport in the second government of Kyriakos Mitsotakis.

== See also ==
- List of members of the Hellenic Parliament, June 2023
