= Lycée Léonin =

Greek non-profit private school

Coordinates: 38°1′22.92″N 23°43′58.46″E

The Lycée Léonin (Greek: Λεόντειο Λύκειο, romanized: Leónteio Lýkeio) is a non-profit private school in Athens, Greece. It was founded in 1838 and belongs to the Catholic Church. Since 1907 it has been run by the Community of the Marist Brothers (Frères Maristes), a group of Catholic monks dedicated to education. The school has campuses in Nea Smyrni and Patissia and is directed by a community of six Marist Brothers that reside in Athens.

== History ==
On July 25, 1838, approximately 14 months from the official opening of the University of Athens, the Catholic priest Constantine Sargologos was granted, "on the order of the Ecclesiastic and Public Education of Royal Secretariat Territory", authorization for the founding of a primary school for boys. The new school was named after the patron saint of Athens, St. Dionysius the Areopagite, and functioned in Plaka.

The St. Dionysius School had been working humbly until 1889, when the Catholic Bishop of Athens managed to expand its activities into both elementary and secondary education and the school was renamed "Lycée Léonin of St. Dionysius", in honor of Pope Leo XIII, who admired Greece and funded this project.

In 1897, the school was transferred at 4 Sina Street in central Athens. Despite its accommodation in a fully equipped building, Lycée Léonin underwent a decline from 1897 until 1907. In order to save the school, the Catholic Bishop of Athens invited monks of the Marist Brothers to take over as they had successfully ran similar schools in Istanbul. After the Marist Brothers undertook the management of the school on September 15, 1907, the number of students was tripled.

In 1916, Lycée Léonin expanded to Patras, and the "St. Andrew" School was founded, which functioned until the end of World War II in 1945. This had been the school of the President of the Hellenic Republic Costis Stephanopoulos.

In October 1924 another campus opened in Patisia. It is known as Lycée Léonin de Patisia.

When Greece joined the allied forces in World War II, the two schools stopped functioning. During the occupation and until April 1945, the Marist Brothers organized soup kitchens and prepared 3000 portions of food daily.

In the beginning of the 1960s, as Lycée Léonin at Sina Street had already 700 students in primary and high school, the building was deemed insufficient and the construction of a new campus in Nea Smyrni was decided and was completed in September 1962. The new campus was inaugurated by the President of the French Republic Charles De Gaulle.

In 1986, as all schools in Greece, Lycée Léonin became co-educational.

== Noted alumni ==
- Costis Stephanopoulos, former President of Greece
- Archbishop Christodoulos of Athens
- Nikos Hadjikyriakos-Ghikas, painter
- Alec Issigonis, engineer and designer of the Mini car
- Thanos Kalliris, singer
- Loukianos Kilaidonis, singer and composer
- Anastasios Peponis, former minister
- Mimis Plessas, Greek composer
- Lasgush Poradeci, Albanian poet
- Ilias Psinakis, celebrity manager
- Vangelis, Greek composer and Academy Award winner
- Andreas Vgenopoulos, head of Marfin Investment Group
- Kyriakos Pierrakakis, Greek finance minister and President of the Eurogroup
