= Konstantinos Floros (politician) =

Greek politician

Konstantinos Floros (born 9 March 1991) is a Greek independent Member of Parliament. He was first elected MP for Larissa with the Spartans in the elections of 25 June 2023.

Of Livadeia origin, born, raised and living in Athens. Until his election he worked in the telecommunications network sector in large private companies. He has been politically active since his student days, taking part in mobilizations such as anti-austerity movement in Greece, in favor of "no" in the 2015 Greek bailout referendum, against Prespa Agreement, against compulsory vaccinations, etc.

Two criminal prosecutions have been brought against Konstantinos Floros, the trial of which is ongoing.

== Parliamentary activity ==
He is a member of Standing Committee on Social Affairs" and was a member of the extraordinary Investigation committee to “investigate the crime at Tempi and all related aspects”. As an independent MP, he submitted his own individual conclusion, in which he concluded that the ministers responsible must be held accountable for their omissions before the judiciary, and to this end he proposed the establishment of a Preliminary Investigation Commission for all offences.

In the legislative process, it has so far voted against all government bills, including same-sex marriage on postal voting and the establishment of non-state universities.

=== Prosecution for voter fraud ===
Konstantinos Floros made his presence felt in Parliament when, as a member of the Spartans party, he stated during his speech in the plenary session that he supported the candidacy of Domokos prison inmate Ilias Kasidiaris for the mayoralty of Athens in the local elections on 8 October 2023. In response to the MP's statement, party leader Vasilis Stigkas made accusations against his parliamentary group, claiming that most of his MPs were subordinates of Ilias Kasidiaris. After clashing with party leader Vasilis Stigkas over his comments, Floros co-signed a statement in which they called him a pawn of the government and accused him of making obscene and defamatory statements. Floros became independent on 4 September 2023.

Vasilis Stigkas' accusations led to the intervention of the Supreme Court Prosecutor's Office, who launched an investigation into the case. The prosecutor of the Supreme Court, seems to have found that the real leader of the Spartans' party was Ilias Kasidiaris, who had taken over their leadership and political support. The Prosecutor's Office has requested that 11 MPs (including Konstantinos Floros) and Ilias Kasidiaris as the instigator be prosecuted on charges of defrauding voters.

=== Assault on a Member of Parliament ===
The charge of assaulting a member of parliament was brought in April 2024, immediately following an attempted violent attack on the Greek Solution MP Vasilis Grammenos.
Specifically, during the parliamentary debate on lifting the immunity of the President of the Greek Solution, Kyriakos Velopoulos, who was accused of slander, the two MPs got into a verbal confrontation that included vulgar insults. The incident between the two was taken outside the chamber, where Konstantinos Floros attacked and beat up Vasilis Grammenos. The President of Parliament summoned the police, who took him to the Attica General Police Directorate, after deciding that the MP had violated "Article 157" of the Penal Code, which makes it a crime to assault a member of parliament in the exercise of his duties. The judicial magistrate filed a criminal complaint.
Note that this is the first time in Greek parliamentary history that an MP has been attacked and assaulted inside Parliament.
