= Larissa (constituency) =

Parliamentary constituency of Greece

- Εκλογική περιφέρεια Λάρισας
- Multi-member constituency for the Hellenic Parliament
- Major Region: Thessaly

Current constituency
- Created: 2012
- Seats: 8
- Subdivisions: Larissa

The constituency of Larissa (Greek: Εκλογική περιφέρεια Λάρισας) is a legislative district of Greece. It corresponds to the territory named Larissa. It has 250,630 registered voters in January 2015.

== Members of parliament ==
=== Since June 2023 ===
Party	Members
New Democracy	Christos Kellas
New Democracy	Christos Kapetanos
New Democracy	Maximos Charakopoulos
PASOK	Evangelia Liakoulis
Syriza	Vasilis Kokkalis
Communist Party	Giorgos Lamproulis
Niki	Giorgos Rountas
Spartans	Konstantinos Floros
