= Laconia (constituency) =

Parliamentary constituency of Greece

- Εκλογική περιφέρεια Λακωνίας
- Multi-member constituency for the Hellenic Parliament
- Major Region: Peloponnese

Current constituency
- Created: 2012
- Seats: 3
- Subdivisions: Laconia

Laconia is a constituency of the Hellenic Parliament.

== Members ==
June 2023
Party	Members
New Democracy	Neoclis Kritikos
New Democracy	Thanasis Davakis
PASOK – Movement for Change	Naya Grigoraku

== See also ==
- List of parliamentary constituencies of Greece
