= Nasos Iliopoulos =

Greek politician (born 1983)

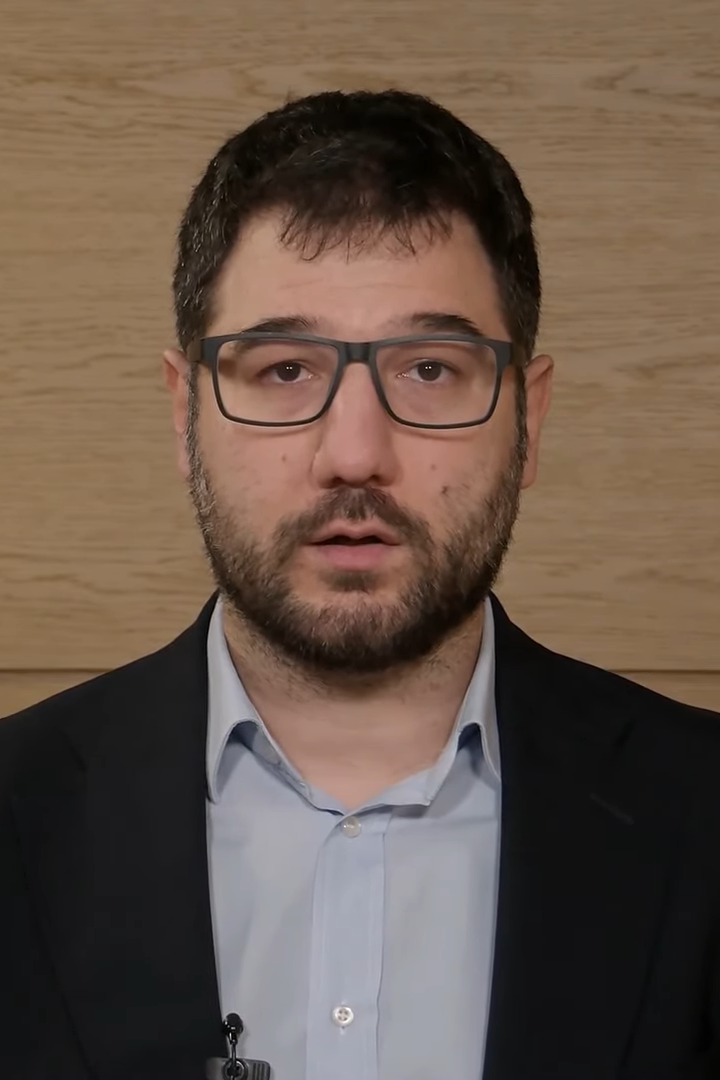

Deputy Minister for Labour, Social Insurance and Social Solidarity
- In office 28 February 2018 – 15 February 2019
- Prime Minister: Alexis Tsipras
- Minister: Effie Achtsioglou
- Succeeded by: Kostas Mparkas

Member of the Hellenic Parliament for Athens A
- Incumbent
- Assumed office 25 June 2023

Secretary of SYN Youth
- In office 2010–2013
- Preceded by: Dimitris Tzanakopoulos
- Succeeded by: Ilias Chronopoulos

SYRIZA Press Representative
- In office 5 September 2020 – 31 December 2022

Personal details
- Born: 20 December 1983 (age 42) Athens, Greece
- Party: New Left (2023–2026)
- Other political affiliations: Syriza (until November 2023)
- Education: ASOEE; Panteio University

Nasos (Athanasios) Iliopoulos (born in Athens on 20 December 1983) is a Greek politician from New Left. He has served as a Deputy Minister for Labour, Social Insurance and Social Solidarity.

== Early life and education ==
He was born on 20 December 1983 in Athens. He studied at the computer department of Athens University of Economics and Business and has completed his post-graduate studies at the department of Political Science and History of Panteio University, in which he is a PhD candidate. He has worked in private education and has collaborated with the Rosa Luxembourg foundation.

== Political career ==
In 2002 he joined SYN Youth and from 2010 until 2013 served as the Secretary of its Central Committee. He is a member of the Central Committee of SYRIZA and used to be a member of the Political Secretariat of the party.

In 2014 he was elected as a regional councilor for Central Attica with Rena Dourou's combination "Power of Life". In the January 2015 Greek legislative election, he stood as a candidate in Athens A with SYRIZA, failing to get elected.

On 11 November 2016 he took over the position of Special Secretary of SEPE. From 28 February 2018 until 15 February 2019 he served as Deputy Minister for Labour, Social Insurance and Social Solidarity in the Second Tsipras Cabinet.

On 21 December 2018 he announced his candidacy for the Athens Mayoral Race. On the first round of the election he got 35.392 votes and 16,98% of the vote and moved to the second round, where, he however was ultimately defeated by his rival, Kostas Bakoyannis, getting 51.487 votes and 34,75% of the vote.

In the 2019 elections he was placed on the eighth spot of the national ballot of SYRIZA.

On 1 September 2019 he was sworn in as a Municipal Councilor for Athens.

In September 2020 he took over as SYRIZA's Press representative, during the reshuffling of the party.

He was elected to the Greek Parliament in the June 2023 Greek legislative election from Athens A district.

In November 2023 he left Syriza and on 5 December 2023, he became a member of New Left parliamentary group. He and seven other New Left MPs departed the parliamentary group in June 2026.
