= Theodora Tzakri =

Greek politician

Theodora Tzakri Θεοδώρα Τζάκρη
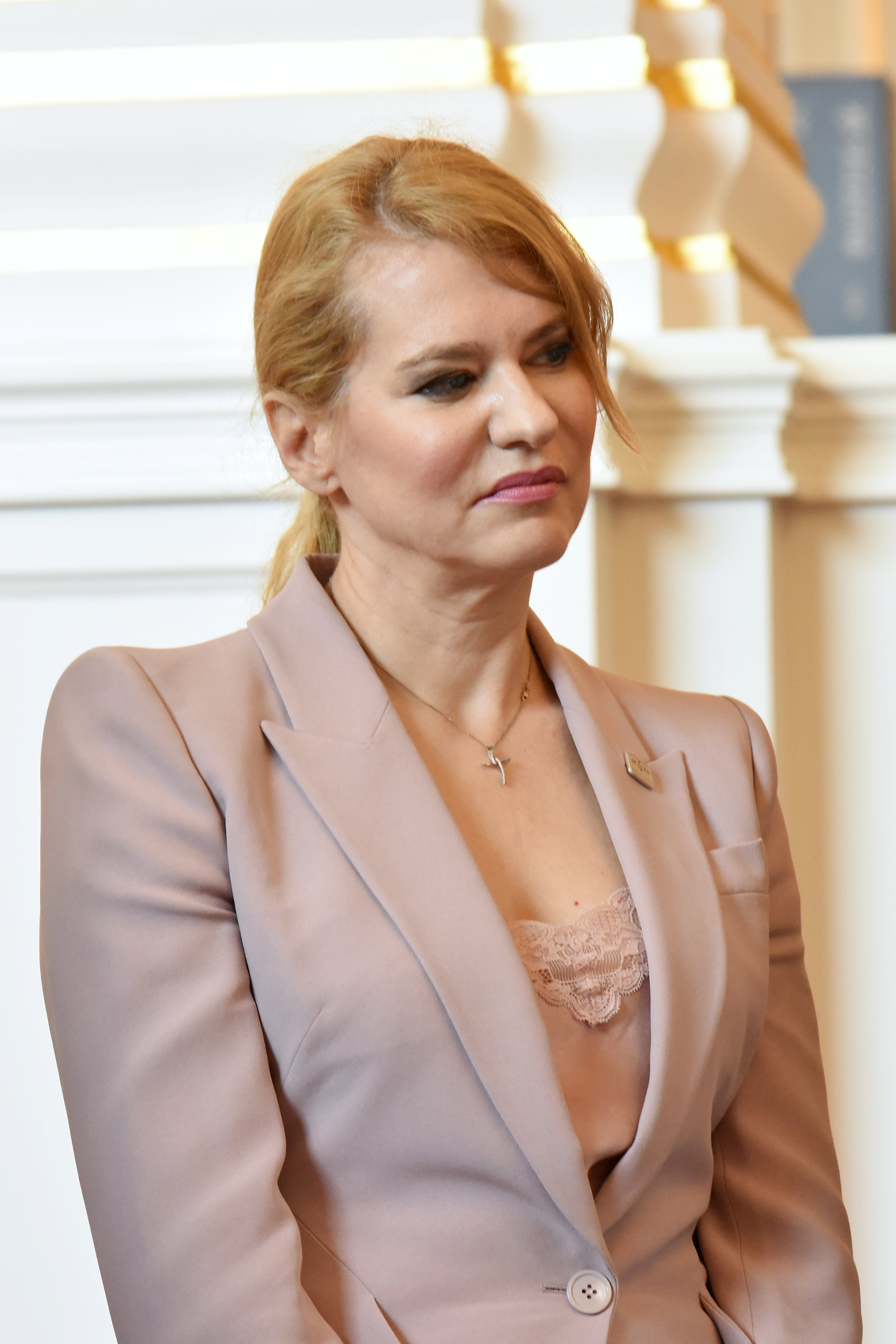

Deputy Minister of Industry
- In office 23 September 2015 – 5 November 2016
- Prime Minister: Alexis Tsipras

Deputy Minister of the Interior, Devolution and Digital Governance
- In office 7 October 2009 – 17 June 2011
- Prime Minister: George Papandreou

Member of the Hellenic Parliament for Pella
- Incumbent
- Assumed office 7 March 2004

Personal details
- Born: 14 September 1970 (age 56) Pella, Greece
- Party: Movement for Democracy (2024–present); SYRIZA (2014–2024); PASOK (2004–2013)
- Spouse: Ioannis Patsias
- Children: 1
- Education: Aristotle University of Thessaloniki
- Website: Personal website

Theodora Tzakri (Greek: Θεοδώρα Τζάκρη; 14 September 1970 in Pella) is a Greek lawyer, politician, member of parliament and former deputy minister of Industry.

In November 2024, during the crisis of SYRIZA on the occasion of the internal party elections, she resigned from the party, became independent and joined the Movement for Democracy, as a founding member.
