= Giorgos Kotsiras =

Greek politician (born 1984)

Member of the Hellenic Parliament
- Incumbent
- Assumed office 7 July 2019
- Constituency: West Attica

Personal details
- Born: 1984 (age 41–42)
- Party: New Democracy

Giorgos Kotsiras (Greek: Γιώργος Κώτσηρας; born 1984) is a Greek politician serving as Deputy Minister of Economy and Finance since March 2025. From 2023 to 2025 he served as Deputy Minister of Foreign Affairs. From 2021 to 2023, he served as deputy minister of justice. He has been a member of the Hellenic Parliament since 2019.
