= Drama (constituency) =

Parliamentary constituency of Greece

- Electoral constituency for the Hellenic Parliament
- Drama within Greece
- Regional units: Drama
- Administrative region: Eastern Macedonia and Thrace
- Population: 117,674 (2015)

Current constituency
- Created: 2012
- Number of members: 3

The Drama electoral constituency (Greek: περιφέρεια Δράμας) is a parliamentary constituency of Greece.

== See also ==
- List of parliamentary constituencies of Greece
