= Zoe Rapti =

Greek lawyer and politician

- Ζωή Ράπτη
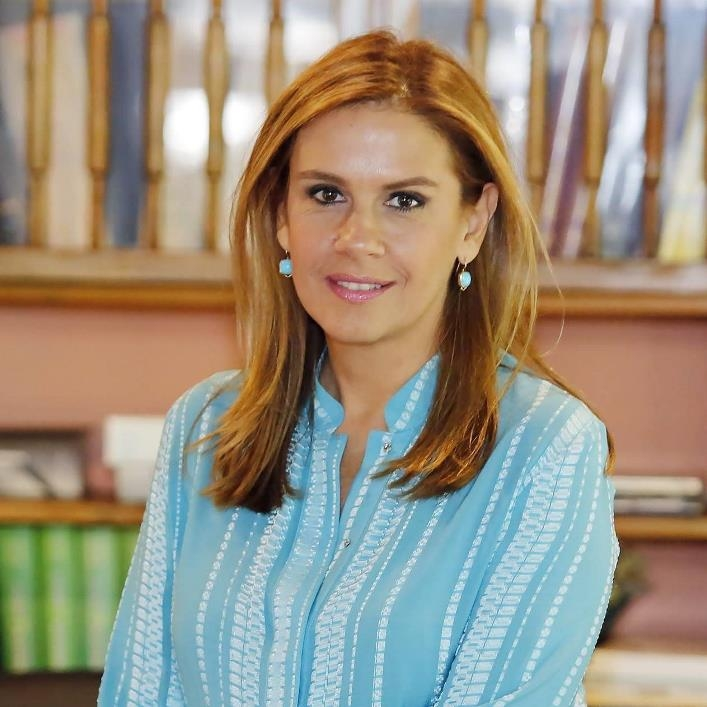
- Rapti in 2020

Member of the Hellenic Parliament
- Incumbent
- Assumed office 25 April 2019
- Constituency: Athens B1

Deputy Minister for Mental Health
- In office 5 August 2020 – 26 May 2023
- Prime Minister: Kyriakos Mitsotakis
- Minister: Vassilis Kikilias; Thanos Plevris

Personal details
- Born: 1966 (age 59–60) Athens
- Citizenship: Greek
- Party: New Democracy
- Education: National and Kapodistrian University of Athens; University of Kent
- Website: zoirapti.gr

Zoe Rapti (Greek: Ζωή Ράπτη; born 1966) is a Greek lawyer and politician, who has been a Member of the Hellenic Parliament for the New Democracy party for Athens B1 since 2019. She served as Deputy Minister for Mental Health in the Cabinet of Kyriakos Mitsotakis from 2020 to 2023.

== Biography ==
Rapti was born in Athens and lives in the Filothei-Psychiko municipality. She studied law at the National and Kapodistrian University of Athens (1984–1989) and then undertook postgraduate study at the University of Kent in the United Kingdom (1990–1991), where she received a Master of Laws with honours in International Commercial Law.

From 1991 to 2014, Rapti worked as a lawyer in Athens in the Council of State where she specialised in environmental and surveyance law. She collaborated with the "Chamber of Environment and Sustainability" from 2001 to 2005 and with the general secretariat of the Olympic Games in the Ministry of Culture on the sustainability and shared use of Olympic facilities from 2004 to 2006.

== Political career ==
Rapti was municipal councillor of Psychiko from 1998 until 2014, serving as deputy mayor from 2005 to 2006 and in 2009, chair of the municipal council in 2007, and representative of the municipality in the Central Union of Greek Municipalities (ΚΕΔΕ) from 2007 to 2010. From 2010 to 2015, she was General Secretary of the Konstantinos Karamanlis Institute of Democracy. She was Secretary of Party Social Relations and a member of the health, labour, and community solidarity divisions of the New Democracy party from 2016 to 2018.

Rapti was a candidate for the New Democracy party in the 2014 European Parliament election. She participated in both the January and September 2015 elections, standing for the New Democracy party in Athens B, but did not win a seat. In April 2019 she was sworn in as member of parliament after the resignation of Vangelis Meimarakis. She was re-elected as member of parliament for Athens B in the July 2019 election and in the May 2023 election.

Since 5 August 2020, Rapti has been a Deputy Minister of Health, with responsibility for mental health in the Cabinet of Kyriakos Mitsotakis.
