= Ioannis Tragakis =

Greek politician and a surveyor engineer

First Vice President of the Hellenic Parliament
- In office 29 June 2012 – 6 February 2015

Personal details
- Born: 21 January 1944 (age 82) Korydallos, Greece
- Party: ND
- Occupation: Politician

Ioannis Tragakis (Greek: Γιάννης Τραγάκης; born 21 January 1944, Korydallos, Greece) is a Greek politician, member of the New Democracy party (ND) and a surveyor engineer.

== Biography ==
He was first elected as a member of parliament with New Democracy in the constituency of Piraeus B in the 1974 elections and was re-elected in the elections of 1977, June and November 1989, 1990, 2004, 2007 and 2009. He was also elected in the elections of May and June 2012 to the Greek Parliament. During the 11th parliamentary term, on 29 June 2012, he was elected First Deputy Speaker of the Parliament with 235 votes in favour, 48 blank votes and 2 invalid votes.

He was re-elected in the Piraeus B constituency in the parliamentary elections of January and September 2015. In 2017, he stated that he would not run again and that, instead of him, his son would be a candidate in the next elections. Following this statement, Kyriakos Mitsotakis responded that his son would not be a candidate with New Democracy. Ultimately, in the parliamentary elections of 2019, Ioannis Tragakis once again ran for office in the Piraeus B constituency and was re-elected.

In the parliamentary elections of May 2023, Ioannis Tragakis did not manage to get elected, but this changed in the parliamentary elections of June, and he returned to the Parliament.

He is currently the oldest active member of the Hellenic Parliament.
