= Aphrodite Ctena =

Greek politician

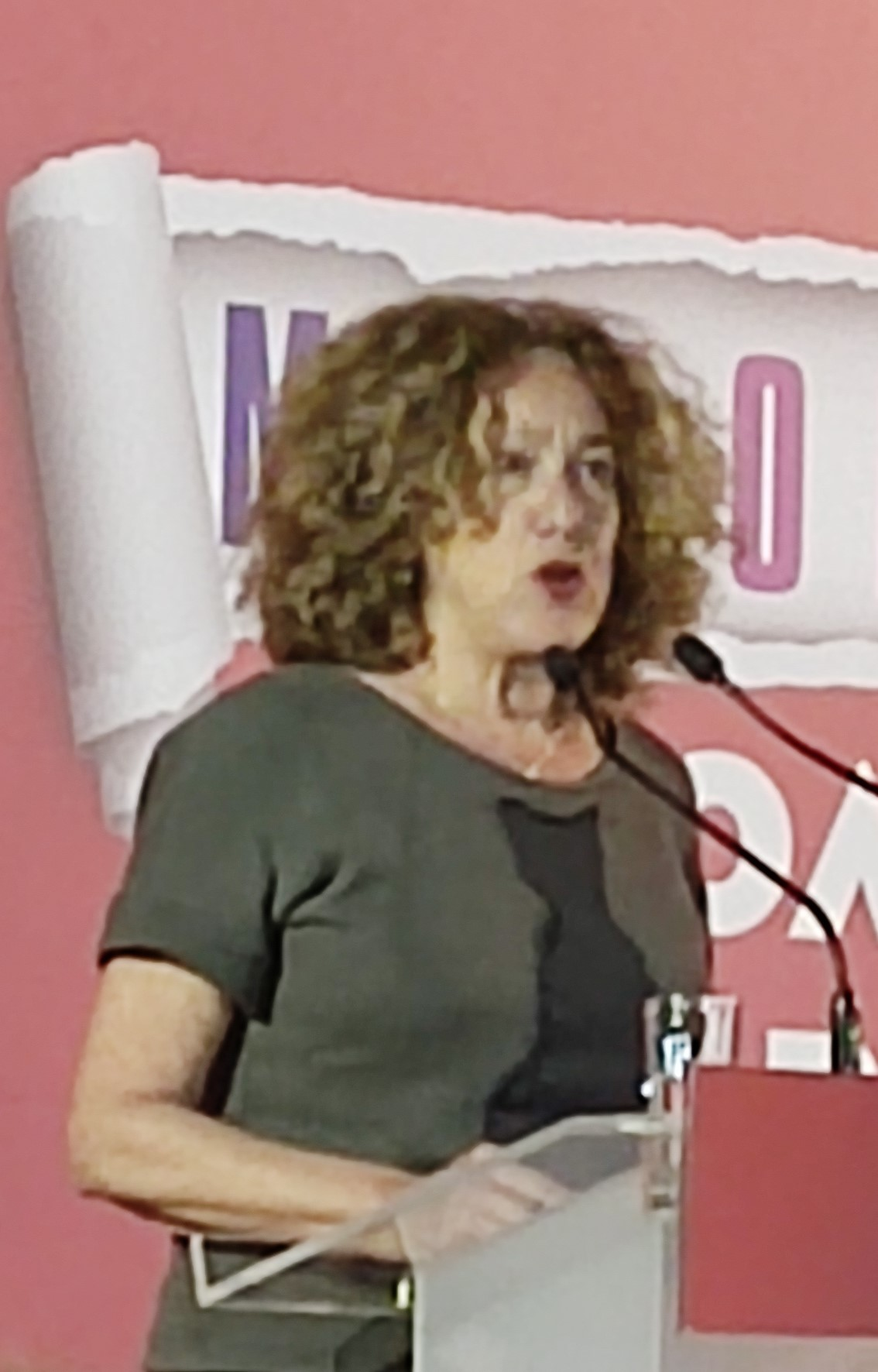
Image of Afroditi Ktena

Aphrodite Ctena (Greek: Αφροδίτη Κτενά) is a Greek politician who is a member of the Hellenic Parliament.

== Biography ==
She was elected in 2023.
