= Rethymno (constituency) =

Parliamentary constituency of Greece

- Electoral constituency for the Hellenic Parliament
- Rethymno within Greece
- Regional units: Rethymno
- Administrative region: Crete
- Population: 71,244 (2015)

Current constituency
- Created: 2012
- Number of members: 2

The Rethymno electoral constituency (Greek: περιφέρεια Ρεθύμνου) is a parliamentary constituency of Greece.

== See also ==
- List of parliamentary constituencies of Greece
