= Konstantinos Tasoulas =

President of Greece since 2025

His Excellency Konstantinos Tasoulas
- Κωνσταντίνος Τασούλας
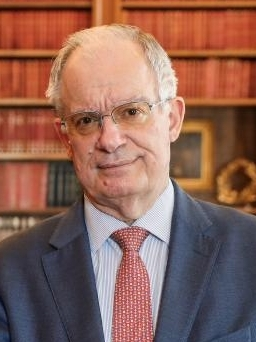
- Tasoulas in 2025

President of Greece
- Incumbent
- Assumed office 13 March 2025
- Prime Minister: Kyriakos Mitsotakis
- Preceded by: Katerina Sakellaropoulou

Speaker of the Hellenic Parliament
- In office 18 July 2019 – 16 January 2025
- Preceded by: Nikos Voutsis
- Succeeded by: Nikitas Kaklamanis

Member of the Hellenic Parliament
- In office 9 April 2000 – 16 January 2025
- Constituency: Ioannina
Other political offices
Minister of Culture and Sports
In office 10 June 2014 – 27 January 2015
Prime Minister	Antonis Samaras
Preceded by	Panos Panagiotopoulos
Succeeded by	Aristides Baltas (Culture, Education and Religious Affairs)
Mayor of Kifissia
In office 1 January 1995 – 31 December 1998
Preceded by	Michalis Kanakakis
Succeeded by	Vasilios Varsos

Personal details
- Born: 17 July 1959 (age 67) Ioannina, Kingdom of Greece
- Party: New Democracy
- Spouse: Fani Stathopoulou
- Children: 2
- Education: National and Kapodistrian University of Athens
- Occupation: Politician; lawyer

Konstantinos Tasoulas (Greek: Κωνσταντίνος Τασούλας [konstaˈdinos taˈsulas]; born 17 July 1959) is a Greek politician and lawyer who has served as the president of Greece since 13 March 2025. He previously served as President of the Hellenic Parliament from 2019 to 2025. A member of the New Democracy party, he was previously an MP for Ioannina from 2000 to 2025. He also briefly served as the Minister of Culture and Sports from 2014 to 2015 during the Antonis Samaras government.

== Early life ==
Tasoulas was born in Ioannina, Greece on 17 July 1959. He studied at the Athens Law School of National and Kapodistrian University of Athens, earning his law degree in 1981. He worked as a lawyer in Athens and London.

== Political career ==
=== Early political career (1981–1993) ===
Joining the New Democracy party from early on, he served from 1981 until 1990 as special secretary of veteran politician Evangelos Averoff's office. In 1990, he was elected municipal councilor, then in 1994 mayor, οf the Kifissia borough of Athens. In 1990, he was appointed head of the Organization of Export Support, where he served until 1993.

=== Parliamentary (2000–2025) ===
In 2000, he was elected MP for Ioannina, a position he held through all subsequent elections continuously. In 2006, he was appointed parliamentary representative of the New Democracy party, of which, in 2010, he assumed the position of General Secretary. In 2007, he served as Defense Deputy Minister, while, in the period 2014-15, as Minister for Sports and Culture.

=== Speakership (2019–2025) ===
Following the 2019 Greek parliamentary election, Tasoulas was elected President of the Hellenic Parliament, with a record of 283 votes in favor, from the government ND party, as well as the opposition parties of Syriza, KINAL, EL, and MeRA25, with the Communist Party of Greece submitting a notion of 15 "present" voters, and two abstentions (by Dimitris Tzanakopoulos and Effie Achtsioglou). It was also the first time a Speaker of the Parliament was elected by open ballot.

=== President of Greece (2025–present) ===
In January 2025, Prime Minister Kyriakos Mitsotakis submitted to the Parliament for approval the candidacy of Tasoulas for the office of the Greek Presidency. Tasoulas accepted the nomination, which was met with criticism from the opposition. After four rounds of voting in the 2025 Greek presidential election, he was elected by Parliament on 12 February 2025, after winning the votes 160 of 300 MPs. He was sworn in on 13 March 2025.

== Personal life ==
Tasoulas is married to Fani Stathopoulou and they have two children.

Political offices
Preceded by Michalis Kanakakis	Mayor of Kifissia; 1995–1998	Succeeded by Vassilis Varsos
Preceded by Panos Panagiotopoulos	Minister of Culture and Sports; 2014–2015	Succeeded by Aristides Baltas as Minister of Culture, Education and Religious Affairs
Preceded by Nikos Voutsis	Speaker of the Hellenic Parliament; 2019–2025	Succeeded by Nikitas Kaklamanis
Preceded by Katerina Sakellaropoulou	President of Greece; 2025–present	Incumbent
Order of precedence
First	Order of precedence of Greece; President of the Republic	Succeeded by Kyriakos Mitsotakis as Prime Minister
