= Kyriakos Pierrakakis =

Greek Minister of National Economy and Finance

- Κυριάκος Πιερρακάκης
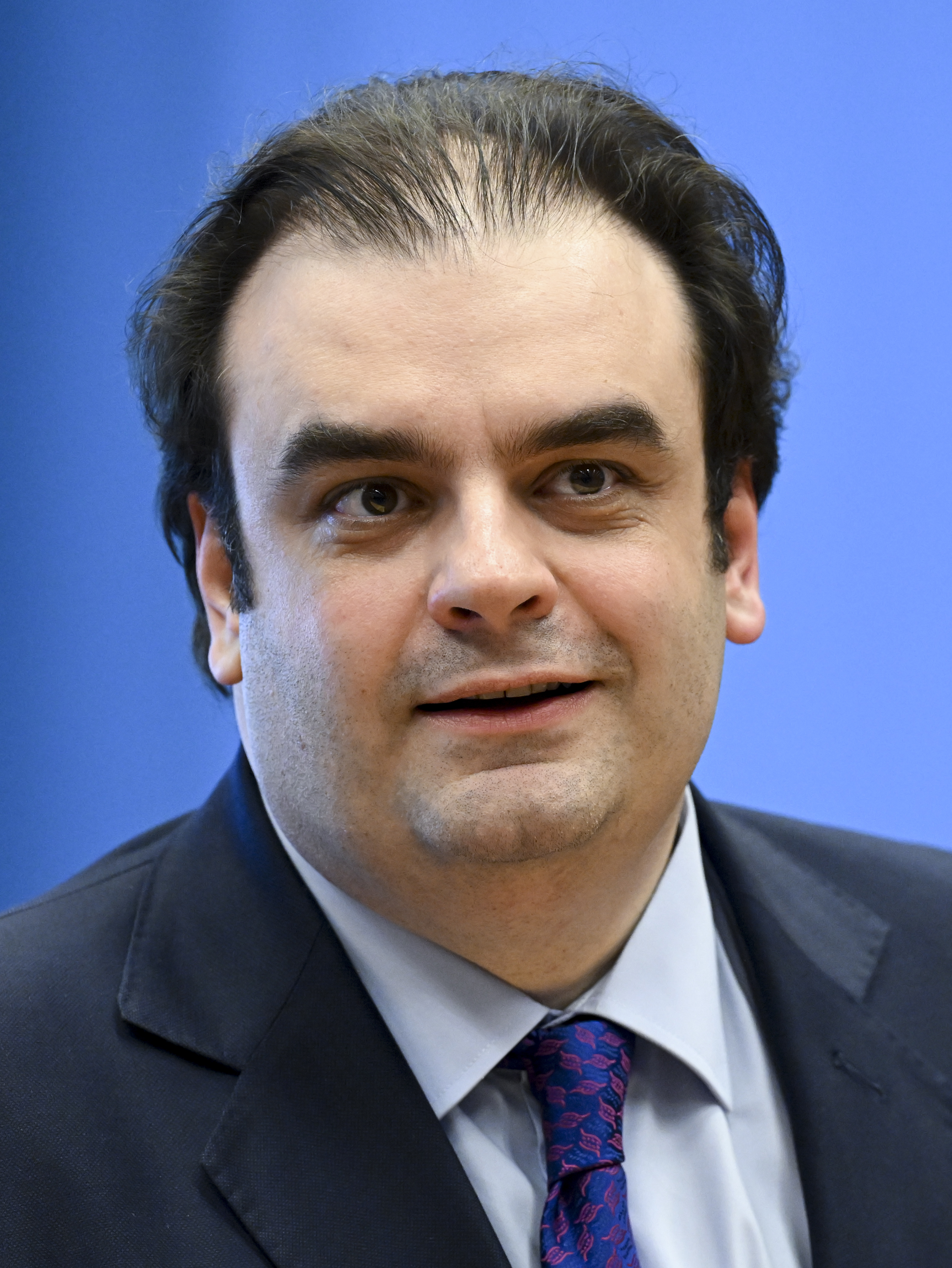
- Pierrakakis in 2025

Minister for the National Economy and Finance
- Incumbent
- Assumed office 15 March 2025
- Prime Minister: Kyriakos Mitsotakis
- Preceded by: Kostis Hatzidakis

President of the Eurogroup
- Incumbent
- Assumed office 12 December 2025
- Preceded by: Paschal Donohoe

Minister for Education, Religious Affairs and Sports
- In office 27 June 2023 – 14 March 2025
- Prime Minister: Kyriakos Mitsotakis
- Preceded by: Christos Kittas (as Minister for Education and Religious Affairs)
- Succeeded by: Sofia Zacharaki

Minister of State and Minister for Digital Governance
- In office 9 July 2019 – 26 May 2023
- Prime Minister: Kyriakos Mitsotakis
- Succeeded by: Vassilios Skouris (as Minister of State); Sokratis Katsikas (as Minister for Digital Governance)

Member of the Hellenic Parliament
- Constituency: Athens A (2023–present)

Personal details
- Born: 8 August 1983 (age 43) Athens, Greece
- Party: New Democracy (since 2016); PASOK (2012–2016)
- Children: 3
- Education: Lycée Léonin
- Alma mater: Athens University of Economics and Business (BSc); Harvard Kennedy School (MPP); Massachusetts Institute of Technology (MTP)

Kyriakos Pierrakakis (Greek: Κυριάκος Πιερρακάκης; born 1983) is a Greek computer scientist and political economist who currently serves as Minister for the National Economy and Finance in the second cabinet of Kyriakos Mitsotakis. He has also served as president of the Eurogroup since 12 December 2025, having been elected for a two-and-a-half-year term by his eurozone counterparts. Pierrakakis previously served as Minister for Digital Governance in the first Mitsotakis cabinet (2019–2023), and as Minister for Education, Religious Affairs and Sports in the second Mitsotakis cabinet from June 2023 to March 2025. He is a Member of the Hellenic Parliament for Athens since 2023.

== Early life and education ==
Born in 1983 in Athens, Pierrakakis grew up in Kato Patisia. He is the son of physician Stefanos Pierrakakis and lawyer Panagiota Stratakou, with ancestry from Areopoli and Krokees, Laconia. He is married and has three children. He graduated in 2001 from the Lycée Léonin in Patisia and studied computer science at the Athens University of Economics and Business until 2005. He is also a graduate of Harvard University's Kennedy School of Government (Master in Public Policy, 2007) and the Massachusetts Institute of Technology (Master in Technology Policy, 2009). In 2014, he married civil engineer Dimitra Moustakatou, with whom he had three children: Stefanos and twins Panagiota and Aikaterini. He speaks Greek, English, and French.

== Political career ==
=== From PASOK to New Democracy ===
After returning to Greece, Pierrakakis served as president of the Youth Institute, where he was actively involved in youth entrepreneurship issues. He also served as an advisor to then-Minister Anna Diamantopoulou at the Ministry of Development. From 2015 to 2019, he served as research director of the independent, non-profit research organization "diaNEOsis", an independent non-profit non-partisan think tank. Pierrakakis produced research papers with a focus on economic growth and understanding the perceptions and beliefs among Greeks.

Pierrakakis began his political career in center-left politics. He was elected member of the PASOK Political Committee in its 9th Congress in 2012 and in 2014 he was a candidate for the European Parliament. Pierrakakis was placed sixth on the Elia ballot with a total of 42.814 votes. During the New Democracy – PASOK coalition government he was member of the Greek negotiation delegation with the Troika appointed by Minister Evangelos Venizelos.

The election of Kyriakos Mitsotakis as leader of New Democracy brought him closer to the party, and several months before the elections he undertook the creation of a plan for the digital transformation of Greece. On 9 July 2019, he was sworn in as Minister of State and Digital Governance in the government of Kyriakos Mitsotakis. In the national election of May 2023, he was a candidate for parliament in the electoral district of Athens, where he was elected first, receiving a total of 55,099 preference votes. He was re-elected in the June elections of the same year.

=== Minister for Digital Governance ===
On 9 July 2019, Pierrakakis was appointed Minister of State and Digital Governance by Kyriakos Mitsotakis. During his tenure, Pierrakakis drove a major digital transformation of Greece's public services. His initiatives, including the development of gov.gr, Greece’s integrated platform for government services, the Gov.gr Wallet app for digital IDs and driving licenses, and the MyHealth app for electronic healthcare records, contributed to a 17.5% annual increase in the digitalization of public services for businesses and citizens alike.

=== Minister of Education ===
Since his appointment as Minister of Education in July 2023, Pierrakakis has led legislative reform in Greece's education sector. This includes the passage of a bill that establishes a legal framework for the operation of private foreign universities in the country, as well as the creation of a digital educational portal and a digital tutoring system.

==== Primary – Secondary Education ====
During the 2024–2025 school year, daily school life was upgraded with:

- the appointment of 10,000 permanent teachers;
- completion of the installation of 36,264 interactive whiteboards in all classrooms from 5th grade elementary through 3rd grade high school;
- integration of Active Citizen Actions into the educational process. Indeed, Greece became the first country to align its curriculum with the 17 UN sustainable development goals;
- establishment of new school operation regulations providing for stricter pedagogical and disciplinary measures.

With Law 5128/2024, the “Digital Tutoring” was established, through which both synchronous and asynchronous distance learning is provided for subjects examined in national exams, while asynchronous distance education will be provided for all subjects from 5th grade elementary and above. Additionally, career guidance was strengthened, as through the “Digital School” application a pre-formatted questionnaire will be available, as well as the possibility of free individual online sessions. Furthermore, in an initiative that brought three teachers to border areas, such as Gavdos, whose children typically followed private education, Autonomous Junior High classes in remote – mountainous areas were established.

Starting from the 2024-2025 school year, reading complete literary works was integrated into Literature classes, instead of excerpted texts as had been the case until now. In the same framework of promoting reading, the eVivlio application was implemented, the first application giving students access to dozens of educational and literary books in audio format (audiobooks). Procedures for establishing multiple book choices were also promoted and the Additional Digital Handbook for Computer Science in all three grades of junior high school was implemented.

Under Pierrakakis, the introduction of the International Baccalaureate (IB) in public Model schools nationwide was launched, starting September 2026. Simultaneously, the “Marietta Giannakou” program began, the largest school infrastructure upgrade program in recent decades, worth 350 million euros with prospects for further expansion through private sector contribution. Finally, with law 5174/2025, Public Onassis Schools were established . These are 22 schools (11 junior high schools and 11 general high schools), which with the support of the Onassis Foundation will operate in areas of the country facing social and economic challenges and will give thousands of male and female students the tools, knowledge, and environment they need to develop their skills.

=== Minister of National Economy and Finance ===
On 14 March 2025, Pierrakakis was appointed Minister of National Economy and Finance in a government reshuffle, succeeding Kostis Hatzidakis. He emphasized fiscal stability, the continuation of structural reforms, the digitalisation of the tax system and the reduction of bureaucracy. On 22 April 2025, following the publication of the 2024 fiscal data, Pierrakakis announced permanent support measures for households and vulnerable groups, including an annual reimbursement equivalent to one month's rent for eligible tenants and a €250 annual payment for low-income pensioners, uninsured elderly people and people with disabilities. The government also announced an increase of €500 million per year in the Public Investment Programme. The measures followed the announcement that Greece had recorded a general government primary surplus of 4.8% of GDP and a headline surplus of 1.3% in 2024.

In September 2026, in a reversal of the Greek government-debt crisis a decade earlier, Pierrakakis highlighted Greece's economic recovery as a source of inspiration for reform in Germany. In an interview with Handelsblatt, he pointed to Greece's return to primary budget surpluses, falling unemployment and economic growth above the euro area average, while stressing that reforms successful in one country may not necessarily be applicable elsewhere. Speaking in Berlin amid discussions about Germany's economic difficulties and the rise of the far right, he said that "reforms and concrete results" were the strongest response to populism, arguing that governments should demonstrate that democracy can deliver tangible results for citizens.

=== President of the Eurogroup ===
On 11 December 2025, Pierrakakis was elected president of the Eurogroup. In early 2026, he views positively the decision made by the six largest EU countries to accelerate market integration.

== Publications ==
- "Work Values in Politics: The European Union Debt Crisis as a Case Study" (2019, co-authored with Anna Diamantopoulou).
