= Xanthi (constituency) =

Parliamentary constituency of Greece

- Electoral constituency for the Hellenic Parliament
- Xanthi within Greece
- Regional units: Xanthi
- Administrative region: Eastern Macedonia and Thrace
- Population: 115,319 (2015)

Current constituency
- Created: 2012
- Number of members: 3

The Xanthi electoral constituency (Greek: περιφέρεια Ξάνθης) is a parliamentary constituency of Greece.

== See also ==
- List of parliamentary constituencies of Greece
