= Chousein Zeimpek =

Greek politician, pharmacist

Chousein Chasan Zeimpek
- Born: March 11, 1968 (age 58); Xanthi, Greece
- Education: School of Pharmacy of Gazi University
- Occupations: Politician, pharmacist
- Political party: Coalition of the Radical Left (SYRIZA)

Chousein Chasan Zeimpek (Greek: Χουσεΐν Χασάν Ζεϊμπέκ, romanized: Chouseïn Chasán Zeïmpék, Turkish: Hüseyin Zeybek; born on March 11, 1968, in Xanthi) is a Greek politician from the Muslim minority of Western Thrace in northeastern Greece.

He has been elected to the Greek Parliament for Coalition of the Radical Left (SYRIZA) in May 2012, and was re-elected in June 2012, January and September 2015. He was nominated by SYRIZA in the 2009 parliamentary elections in the Xanthi Prefecture, and was a candidate for the post of deputy regional governor in the local government elections of 2010. He is vice-president of the association of Pharmacists of Xanthi, and has served as president of the school board of the 1st Minority Primary School in Xanthi.

Zeimpek was one of ten SYRIZA MPs who left the party to form New Left in 2023, but departed the new party with seven others in 2026.

Ηe is a graduate of the School of Pharmacy of the Gazi University in Ankara, and since 2003 he works as a pharmacist in Xanthi.
