= Aspasia Kouroupaki =

Greek MP

- Ασπασία Κουρουπάκη

Member of the Hellenic Parliament
- Incumbent
- Assumed office June 2023
- Constituency: B1 Northern Sector of Athens

Personal details
- Born: 1976 (age 49–50) Athens, Greece
- Party: Niki
- Education: National and Kapodistrian University of Athens (Biology); Technological Educational Institute of Athens (Medical Laboratory Technology)
- Occupation: Biologist, health scientist, educator, politician
- Committees: Special Standing Committee on Research and Technology

Aspasia Kouroupaki (Greek: Ασπασία Κουρουπάκη; born 1976 in Athens) is a Greek biologist, health scientist, educator and politician, as well as member of the Hellenic Parliament of the B1 Northern Sector of Athens with Niki from the June 2023 elections. She is currently member of the Special Standing Committee on Research and Technology.

Originally from Crete, she was born in Athens in 1976. He studied Biology at the National and Kapodistrian University of Athens and Medical Laboratory Technology at the Technological Educational Institute of Athens.

In the May 2023 elections, she was a candidate for MP in B1' constituency of Athens, coming first in the polls with 3,806 votes, but was not elected as her party received less than 3% of the vote nationally. In the next election, in June, she was elected MP on the basis of the May election ranking after the party passed the electoral threshold.

Kouroupaki has expressed opposition to vaccines against coronavirus and sex education in schools. She has also proposed to increase the tax-free threshold to 50,000 especially for third and large families in the country.
