= Meropi Tzoufi =

Greek politician

Meropi Tzoufi Μερόπη Τζούφη

Member of the Hellenic Parliament
- Incumbent
- Assumed office 5 February 2015

Personal details
- Born: 18 October 1956 (age 69) Ioannina, Greece
- Party: Independent (2026–)
- Other political affiliations: Communist Youth of Greece; Communist Party of Greece (1980s); Syriza (until November 2023) New Left (December 2023–June 2026)
- Spouse: Evangelos Makarios
- Children: 2
- Education: National and Kapodistrian University of Athens

Meropi Tzoufi (Greek: Μερόπη Τζούφη; born 10 October 1956) is a Greek politician, member of the New Left Party, former Deputy Minister of Education, Research and Religious Affairs in the government of Alexis Tsipras and Professor of Pediatrics - Pediatric Neurology at the Department of Medicine, School of Health Sciences of the University of Ioannina.

Born in Ioannina, she graduated from the National and Kapodistrian University of Athens's Medical School in 1983. While a student there, she joined the Communist Youth of Greece, and was also part of the Communist Party of Greece in the 1980s. She is married to economist Evangelos Makarios, and has two daughters, making her home with them in Ioannina in 1985.

After graduating from university, Tzoufi worked as a doctor in Konitsa, then was a pediatric specialist in Ioannina. In the 1990s, she became a curator for Greece's National Healthcare Service and worked as a curator. In 2003, she became a lecturer at the University of Ioannina, then was an assistant professor in the Pediatric Health department from 2006 to 2012. She also served as a board member of the Greek Pediatric Neurology Society. In the January 2015 Greek elections, the Syriza party won four of five seats in Ioannina; as one of the founding members of the party, Tzoufi was given one of the seats. She was re-elected in the September 2015 elections, and has held the position since. She has served on the Cultural and Educational Affairs and the Social Affairs committees, as well as the special committee on Equality, Youth and Human Rights.

Left Syriza in November 2023, disagreeing with the party's shift to the center and the abandonment of its left-wing ideology. joined the New Left party along with other outgoing Syriza MPs. She and seven other New Left MPs departed the parliamentary group in June 2026 following disagreements with party leadership.
