= Ozgkiour Ferchat =

Greek dentist and politician

Ozgkiour Nazif Ferchat (Greek: Φερχάτ Οζγκιούρ Ferchát Ozgkioýr, born in 1985 in Greece), is a Greek dentist and politician from the Muslim minority of Greece.

== Biography ==
Ozkgiour Ferchat grew up, lives and works in Íasmos, in the regional district of Rhodope, in Eastern Macedonia and Thrace. He started elementary school for minorities and finished high school in Íasmos. He then graduated from the Athens Dental School.

Coming from a leftist family, he followed the path of his father, Nazif Ferchat, having for many years been actively involved in social, human rights and minority struggles. He joined the Youth Coalition in 2003 and was a member of the Student Union, vice-president of the Association of Dentists, founding member of the Minority Cultural Association, member of Minority Scientists, member of K.E. SYRIZA-PS and head of the health department of N.E. Rhodope. Since 2012 he has been a member of NE, of which he was deputy coordinator for several years. He was a scientific collaborator in the KO of SYRIZA-PS and was a candidate for parliament in 2019.

In the Greek legislative elections of May 2023, he was elected deputy to the Hellenic Parliament on the SYRIZA list.

He speaks Greek, Turkish and English.

== Sources ==
- Hellenic Parliament
- Ozgkioyr Ferchat
