= New Left (Greece) =

Political party in Greece

New Left Νέα Αριστερά Néa Aristerá
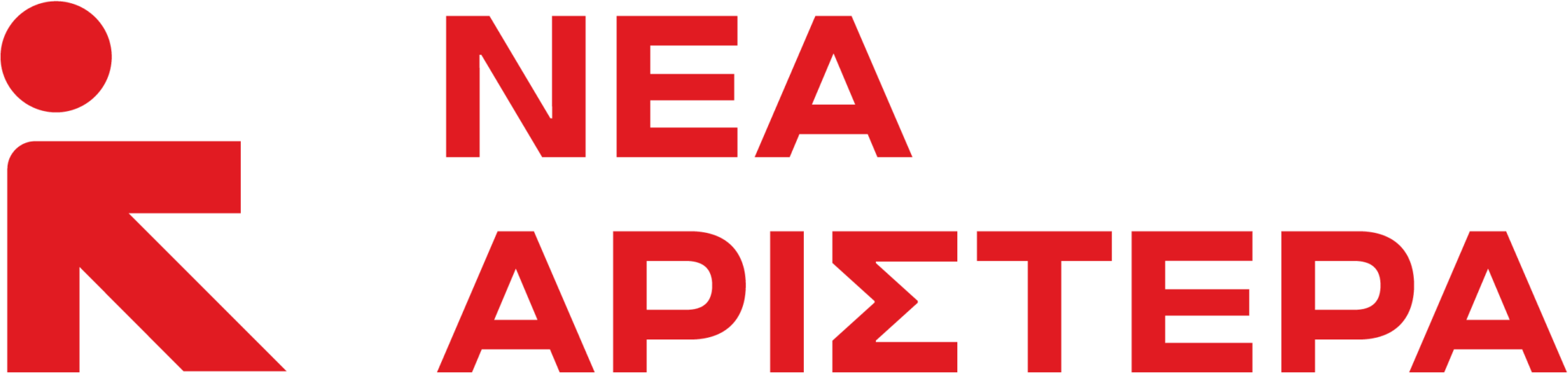
- Abbreviation: NEAR
- President: Gabriel Sakellaridis
- Secretary: Gabriel Sakellaridis
- Founded: 4 December 2023 (as a parliamentary group); 3 March 2024 (as a party)
- Registered: 5 December 2023
- Split from: Syriza
- Headquarters: Athens, Greece
- Newspaper: I Epochi
- Youth wing: New Left Youth
- Ideology: Social Democracy; Democratic socialism
- Political position: Centre-left; Left-wing
- European affiliation: Party of the European Left
- Colours: Red; Purple
- Hellenic Parliament: 4 / 300
- European Parliament: 0 / 21

Website
- neaaristera.gr

The New Left (NEAR; Greek: Νέα Αριστερά, romanized: Néa Aristerá, ΝΕΑΡ) is a left-wing democratic socialist political party in the Hellenic Parliament. It was founded on 4 December 2023 by eleven independent MPs who left the Syriza party.

Since March 2026, the acting president has been the secretary of the Central Committee, Gabriel Sakellaridis, while the president of the Parliamentary Group is MP Peti Perka.

== History ==
After the resignation of Alexis Tsipras as president of Syriza, and the subsequent election of Stefanos Kasselakis to replace him in September 2023, there was an internal crisis in the party. The internal party groups "Umbrella" and "6+6" criticized Kasselakis's attempt to move the party towards the center. Kasselakis is considered to be more moderate than Tsipras, wanting the party to emulate the Democratic Party in the United States, a social-liberal party. He was criticized by some Syriza members for his previous support of the centre-right party New Democracy, which currently has a majority in the Hellenic Parliament and is opposed by Syriza. The 6+6 faction included deputy Effie Achtsioglou, who finished as runner-up to Kasselakis in the leadership election.

This conflict eventually culminated in the withdrawal of the "Umbrella" faction from the party and the removal of two MPs considered close to it (Peti Perka and Euclid Tsakalotos) on Kasselakis's orders on 13 November 2023. Ten days later, the "6+6" group and nine MPs from it (Sia Anagnostopoulou, Effie Achtsioglou, Chousein Zeimpek, Nasos Iliopoulos, Dimitris Tzanakopoulos, Meropi Tzoufi, Ozgur Ferhat, Theano Fotiou, and Alexis Haritsis) withdrew from Syriza.

On 4 December 2023, the eleven independent MPs announced the name and logo of their new party at a scheduled event. The next day, the parliamentary group was officially announced in the Hellenic Parliament. MEP Dimitrios Papadimoulis announced his affiliation with the group the same day.

On 1 March 2024, the party's founding conference was held in Athens. The foundation declaration summarised the fundamental positions of the party and announced the establishment of a Transitional Coordination Committee with 238 members.

On 9 June 2024, in the European Parliament elections, the party failed to retain its MEPs, Dimitrios Papadimoulis and Stelios Kouloglou, receiving only 2.45% of the vote, and failing to reach the 3% threshold.

On 15 May 2026, Ozgur Ferhat left the party group to sit as an independent. On 2 June, seven members of the parliamentary group — Effie Achtsioglou, Alexis Haritsis, Nasos Iliopoulos, Dimitris Tzanakopoulos, Theano Fotiou, Meropi Tzoufi, and Chousein Zeimpek — and 150 total members resigned from the party after disagreements with party leadership. The New Left parliamentary group subsequently dissolved as it had fallen below the requisite 10 members of parliament. Achtsioglou also resigned her seat that day.

== Election results ==
=== European Parliament ===
European Parliament
Election	Votes	%	±pp	Seats won	+/−	Rank	Leader	EP Group
2024	97,554	2.45	New	0 / 21	New	10th	Alexis Haritsis	The Left
