= Athens B2 =

Parliamentary constituency of Greece

- Electoral constituency for the Hellenic Parliament
- Athens B2 – West Athens within Greece and Attica
- Regional unit: West Athens
- Administrative region: Attica
- Population: 386,969 (2011)
- Major settlements: Peristeri, Ilion

Current constituency
- Created: 2018
- Number of members: 12

The B2 Electoral District of the West Sector of Athens (Greek: Β2ʹ Εκλογική Περιφέρεια Δυτικού Τομέα Αθηνών) is a parliamentary constituency of Greece, created after the breakup of Athens B in 2018. The first MPs of the newly formed constituency were elected on 7 July 2019.

== Boundaries ==
The constituency includes most of the western suburbs of the Athens metropolitan area, namely:

Municipality	Districts
Agia Varvara	Agia Varvara
Agioi Anargyroi-Kamatero	Agioi Anargyroi, Kamatero
Aigaleo	Aigaleo
Haidari	Haidari
Ilion	Ilion
Peristeri	Peristeri
Petroupoli	Petroupoli
