= Preveza (constituency) =

Parliamentary constituency of Greece

- Electoral constituency for the Hellenic Parliament
- Preveza within Greece
- Regional units: Preveza
- Administrative region: Epirus
- Population: 67,009 (2011)

Current constituency
- Created: 2012
- Number of members: 1

The Preveza electoral constituency (Greek: περιφέρεια Πρέβεζας) is a parliamentary constituency of Greece. It is a single-member district and elected one MP to the Hellenic Parliament.

== See also ==
- List of parliamentary constituencies of Greece
