= Pieria (constituency) =

Parliamentary constituency of Greece

- Electoral constituency for the Hellenic Parliament
- Pieria within Greece
- Regional units: Pieria
- Administrative region: Central Macedonia
- Population: 130,052 (2015)

Current constituency
- Created: 2012
- Number of members: 4

The Pieria electoral constituency (Greek: περιφέρεια Πιερίας) is a parliamentary constituency of Greece.

== See also ==
- List of parliamentary constituencies of Greece
