= Corfu (constituency) =

Parliamentary constituency of Greece

- Electoral constituency for the Hellenic Parliament
- Corfu constituency within Greece
- Regional units: Corfu
- Administrative region: Ionian Islands
- Population: 110,828 (2011)

Current constituency
- Created: 2012
- Number of members: 1

The Corfu electoral constituency (Greek: Εκλογική περιφέρεια Κέρκυρας) is a parliamentary constituency of Greece. It comprises the municipalities of North Corfu, Central Corfu and Diapontian Islands, South Corfu and Paxos and elects three MPs to the Hellenic Parliament.

== See also ==
- List of parliamentary constituencies of Greece
