= Dimitris Tzanakopoulos =

Greek politician and lawyer

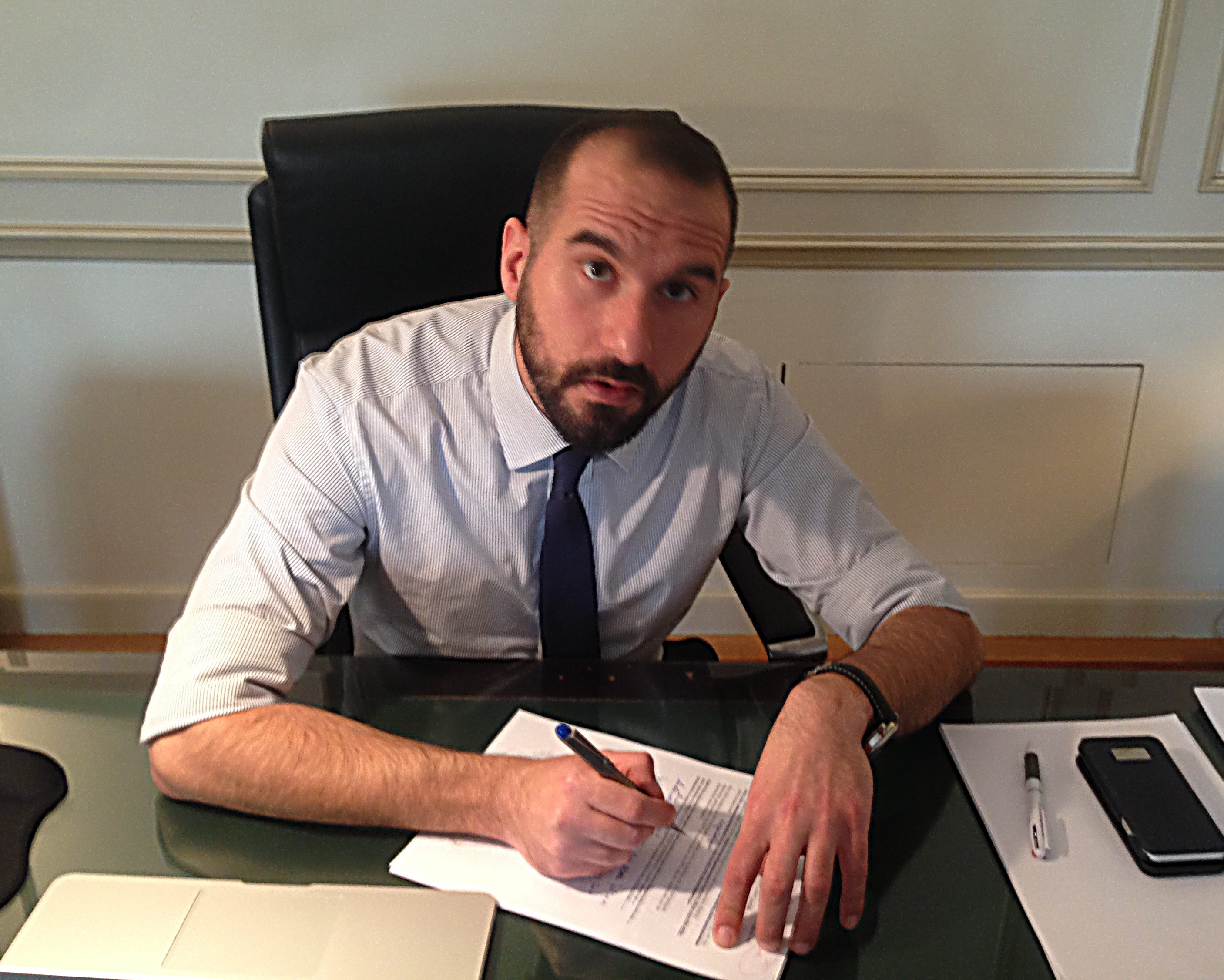

Dimitris Tzanakopoulos (Greek: Δημήτρης Τζανακόπουλος; born 5 June 1982) is a Greek politician and a lawyer. He was a Minister of State & the Government Spokesperson of the Hellenic Republic (Greece) in the cabinet of Alexis Tsipras between 2016 and 2019. In the snap general election of 7 July 2019 he was elected Member of Parliament for Athens (A).

== Early life and education ==
He was born in Athens in 1982. His older brother, Antonios Tzanakopoulos, is a professor of law at the University of Oxford, while his younger sister, Maria Tzanakopoulou, is a Lecturer at Birkbeck, University of London. Tzanakopoulos graduated from the Athens Law School with a Bachelor of Laws degree and a master's degree in Philosophy of Law. He is a PhD candidate in Legal Theory at the University of London. He has published academic papers and articles in the ‘Law and Critique’ journal; the collective volume of the ‘Nicos Poulantzas Institute’; and various other journals and newspapers.

== Political career ==
He was elected secretary of the SYRIZA Youth organisation in 2005. In 2012 he was appointed legal adviser to SYRIZA's parliamentary office and in 2015 he became director general of Prime Minister Alexis Tsipras office. From November 2016 until June 2019 he was Minister of State and Government Spokesperson. He was elected Member of Parliament for Athens (A) in the snap election of 7 July 2019. In November 2023 he left Syriza with 10 other MPs and, on 5 December 2023, became a member of New Left parliamentary group. He was one of seven MPs who departed the New Left group in June 2026.
