= Ministry of Education, Religious Affairs and Sports =

Government ministry of Greece

- Υπουργείο Παιδείας, Θρησκευμάτων και Αθλητισμού

Agency overview
- Formed: July 27, 2023
- Preceding agencies: Ministry of Education and Religious Affairs (2019 - 2023); Ministry of Culture and Sports (2013 - 2023)
- Type: Ministry
- Jurisdiction: Government of Greece
- Headquarters: 37 Andrea Papandreou str., Marousi
- Employees: 175.696 (2024)
- Annual budget: 6.606.000.000 €
- Minister responsible: Sofia Zacharaki
- Deputy Ministers responsible: Giannis Vroutsis, for Sport (alternate minister); Kostas Vlasis; Nikos Papaioannou, for higher education
- Child agencies: General Secretariat for Religious Affairs; General Secretariat for Primary, Secondary and Special Education; General Secretariat for Higher Education; General Secretariat for Vocational Education, Training, Lifelong Learning and Youth; General Secretariat for Sports
- Website: www.minedu.gov.gr

The Ministry of Education, Religious Affairs and Sports (Greek: Υπουργείο Παιδείας, Θρησκευμάτων και Αθλητισμού) is a government department of Greece. One of the oldest ministries, established in 1833, it is responsible for running the country's education system and for supervising the religions in Greece.

== History ==
| Years | Name |
|---|---|
| 1833-1862 | On Religious Affairs and Public Education Secretariat of State |
| 1862–1926 | Ministry of Religious Affairs and Public Education |
| 1926–1949 | Ministry of Religious Affairs and Education |
| 1949–1955 | Ministry of Religious Affairs and National Education |
| 1955–2009 | Ministry of National Education and Religious Affairs |
| 2009–2012 | Ministry of Education, Lifelong Learning and Religious Affairs |
| 2012–2013 | Ministry of Education, Religious Affairs, Culture and Sport |
| 2013–2015 | Ministry of Education and Religious Affairs |
| January–September 2015 | Ministry of Culture, Education and Religious Affairs |
| 2015–2019 | Ministry of Education, Research and Religious Affairs |
| 2019–2023 | Ministry of Education and Religious Affairs |
| 2023 - | Ministry of Education, Religious Affairs and Sports |

== List of ministers ==
=== National education and religious affairs (1981–2009) ===
| Name | Took office | Left office | Party |
|---|---|---|---|
| Eleftherios Veryvakis | 21 October 1981 | 5 July 1982 | PASOK |
| Apostolos Kaklamanis | 5 July 1982 | 25 April 1986 | PASOK |
| Antonis Tritsis | 25 April 1986 | 9 May 1988 | PASOK |
| Apostolos Kaklamanis | 9 May 1988 | 22 June 1988 | PASOK |
| George Papandreou | 22 June 1988 | 2 July 1989 | PASOK |
| Vasilis Kontogiannopoulos | 2 July 1989 | 12 October 1989 | New Democracy |
| Konstantinos Despotopoulos | 12 October 1989 | 23 November 1989 | Independent |
| Costas Simitis | 23 November 1989 | 13 February 1990 | PASOK |
| Konstantinos Despotopoulos | 13 February 1990 | 11 April 1990 | Independent |
| Vasilis Kontogiannopoulos | 11 April 1990 | 10 January 1991 | New Democracy |
| Georgios Souflias | 10 January 1991 | 13 October 1993 | New Democracy |
| Dimitris Fatouros | 13 October 1993 | 8 July 1994 | New Democracy |
| George Papandreou | 8 July 1994 | 25 September 1996 | PASOK |
| Gerasimos Arsenis | 25 September 1996 | 13 April 2000 | PASOK |
| Petros Efthymiou | 13 April 2000 | 10 March 2004 | PASOK |
| Marietta Giannakou | 10 March 2004 | 19 September 2007 | New Democracy |
| Evripidis Stylianidis | 19 September 2007 | 8 January 2009 | New Democracy |
| Aris Spiliotopoulos | 8 January 2009 | 7 October 2009 | New Democracy |

=== Education, lifelong learning and religious affairs (2009–2012) ===
| Name | Took office | Left office | Party | Notes |
|---|---|---|---|---|
| Anna Diamantopoulou | 7 October 2009 | 7 March 2012 | PASOK | |
| Georgios Babiniotis | 7 March 2012 | 17 May 2012 | Independent | National unity government |
| Frosso Kiaou | 17 May 2012 | 21 June 2012 | Independent | Caretaker government |

=== Education, religious affairs, culture and sport (2012–2013) ===
| Name | Took office | Left office | Party | Notes |
|---|---|---|---|---|
| Konstantinos Arvanitopoulos | 21 June 2012 | 25 June 2013 | New Democracy | Coalition government |

=== Education and religious affairs (2013–2015) ===
| Name | Took office | Left office | Party | Notes |
|---|---|---|---|---|
| Konstantinos Arvanitopoulos | 25 June 2013 | 10 June 2014 | New Democracy | Coalition government |
| Andreas Loverdos | 10 June 2014 | 27 January 2015 | PASOK | Coalition government |

=== Culture, education and religious affairs (2015) ===
| Name | Took office | Left office | Party | Notes |
|---|---|---|---|---|
| Aristides Baltas | 27 January 2015 | 27 August 2015 | Syriza | Coalition government |
| Frosso Kiaou | 28 August 2015 | 21 September 2015 | Independent | Caretaker government |

=== Education, research and religious affairs (2015–2019) ===
| Name | Took office | Left office | Party | Notes |
|---|---|---|---|---|
| Nikos Filis | 23 September 2015 | 5 November 2016 | Syriza | Coalition government |
| Kostas Gavroglou | 5 November 2016 | 9 July 2019 | Syriza | Coalition government |

=== Education and religious affairs (2019–2023) ===
| Name | Took office | Left office | Party | Notes |
|---|---|---|---|---|
| Niki Kerameus | 9 July 2019 | 26 May 2023 | New Democracy | Cabinet of Kyriakos Mitsotakis |
| Christos Kittas | 26 May 2023 | 26 June 2023 | Independent | Caretaker Cabinet of Ioannis Sarmas |

=== Education, religious affairs and sports (2023–present) ===
| Name | Took office | Left office | Party | Notes |
|---|---|---|---|---|
| Kyriakos Pierrakakis | 26 May 2023 | 15 March 2025 | New Democracy | Second Cabinet of Kyriakos Mitsotakis |
| Sofia Zacharaki | 15 March 2025 | | New Democracy | Second Cabinet of Kyriakos Mitsotakis |
