= East Attica (constituency) =

Parliamentary constituency of Greece

- Α' Ανατολικής Αττικής
- Constituency for the Hellenic Parliament
- Major Region: Attica
- Population: 502,348 (2011)
- Electorate: 358,178 (2019)

Current constituency
- Created: 2018
- Seats: 10
- Members: ND (4); SYRIZA (3); KKE (1); GS (1); MeRA25 (1)

East Attica is a constituency of the Hellenic Parliament.

== See also ==
- List of parliamentary constituencies of Greece
