= Athens B3 =

Parliamentary constituency of Greece

- Electoral constituency for the Hellenic Parliament
- Athens B3 – South Athens within Greece and Attica
- Regional units: South Athens
- Administrative region: Attica
- Population: 601,559 (2011)
- Major settlements: Athens

Current constituency
- Created: 2018
- Number of members: 18

The B3 Athens electoral constituency (Greek: Β3΄ Εκλογική περιφέρεια Νότιου Τομέα Αθηνών) is a parliamentary constituency of Greece, created after the breakup of Athens B in 2018. It is the largest electoral district in the country by representation, electing 18 deputies.

== See also ==
- List of parliamentary constituencies of Greece
