= Kostas Karamanlis (politician, born 1974) =

Greek politician

- Κώστας Καραμανλής
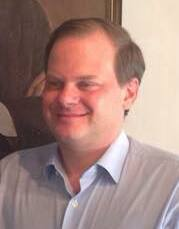
- Karamanlis in 2015

Minister of Infrastructure, Transport and Networks
- In office 9 July 2019 – 1 March 2023
- Prime Minister: Kyriakos Mitsotakis
- Preceded by: Christos Spirtzis
- Succeeded by: Giorgos Gerapetritis

Member of the Hellenic Parliament
- Incumbent
- Assumed office 25 January 2015

Personal details
- Born: 12 December 1974 (age 51) Athens, Greece
- Party: New Democracy
- Spouse: Miranda Michalopoulou
- Children: 3
- Relatives: Konstantinos Karamanlis (uncle); Kostas Karamanlis (cousin)
- Education: Hamilton College; Tufts University
- Website: kostaskaramanlis.gr

Konstantinos Achileas Karamanlis (Greek: Κωνσταντίνος Αχιλλέα Καραμανλής; born 12 December 1974), commonly known as Kostas Karamanlis (Greek: Κώστας Καραμανλής, pronounced [ˈkostas karamanˈlis]), is a Greek politician. From 2019 to 2023, he served as the Minister of Infrastructure and Transport in the cabinet of Kyriakos Mitsotakis, until his resignation following the Tempi train crash disaster.

== Early life and career ==
Karamanlis comes from a family with long political traditions. He is the son of politician Achileas Karamanlis, nephew of Konstantinos Karamanlis and cousin of Kostas Karamanlis. Karamanlis studied history and economics at Hamilton College in New York, then studied at Tufts University in Massachusetts. From 2002 to 2004, he worked in London at the Swiss investment bank UBS Warburg. Later, for ten years he was managing director of a shipping company in Piraeus.

== Political career ==
Karamanlis became involved in political activities representing New Democracy. In January 2015, he was first elected a member of the Hellenic Parliament in the Serres constituency. He successfully ran for re-election in the elections in September 2015 and 2019.

In July 2019, the Prime Minister Kyriakos Mitsotakis appointed Karamanlis with the position of Minister of Infrastructure and Transport. On 1 March 2023, he resigned in response to the previous day's Tempi train crash, to "[take] objective political responsibility". He ran however again in the May 2023 election and was re-elected in his constituency of Serres.

In an article published by Politico, Karamanlis was mentioned as one of the two former ministers suspected by EPPO prosecutors for breach of duty in connection with the Tempi train crash in Feb 28, 2023 where 57 people were killed.
