= Giorgos Gerapetritis =

Greek politician (born 1967)

- Γιώργος Γεραπετρίτης
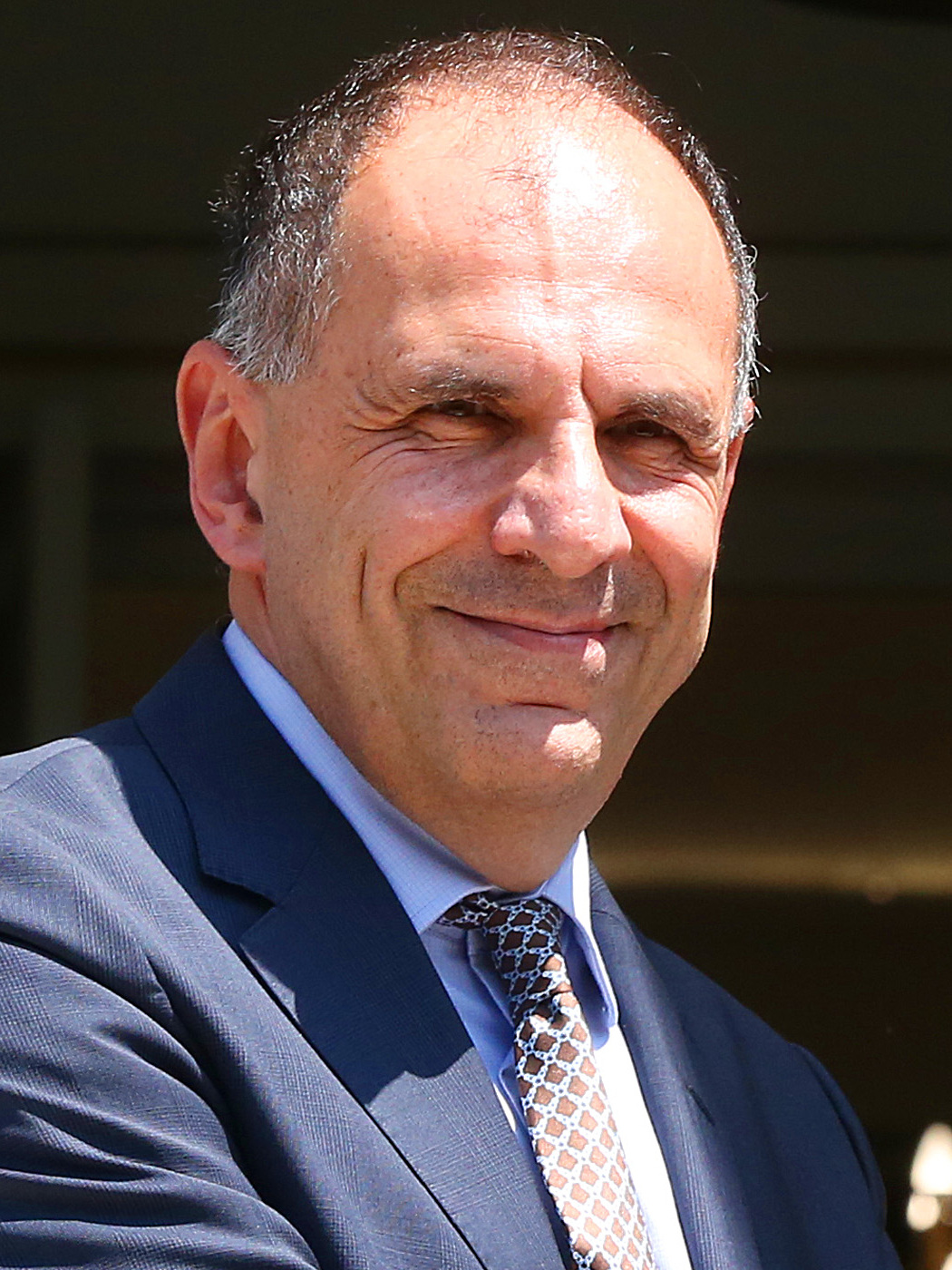
- Gerapetritis in 2023

Minister for Foreign Affairs
- Incumbent
- Assumed office 27 June 2023
- Prime Minister: Kyriakos Mitsotakis
- Deputy: Giorgos Kotsiras; Alexandra Papadopoulou
- Preceded by: Vassilis Kaskarelis (caretaker)

Minister of State
- In office 9 July 2019 – 26 May 2023
- Prime Minister: Kyriakos Mitsotakis
- Preceded by: Dimitris Tzanakopoulos; Christoforos Vernardakis
- Succeeded by: Vassilios Skouris (caretaker)

Minister of Infrastructure and Transport
- Acting
- In office 1 March 2023 – 26 May 2023
- Prime Minister: Kyriakos Mitsotakis
- Preceded by: Kostas Karamanlis
- Succeeded by: Ioannis Golias (caretaker)

Member of the Hellenic Parliament
- In office 7 July 2019 – 22 April 2023

Personal details
- Born: 26 June 1967 (age 59) Karpathos, Greece
- Party: New Democracy
- Spouse: Alexandra Gourzi
- Children: 2
- Education: National and Kapodistrian University of Athens (LLB); University of Edinburgh (LLM); University of Oxford (DPhil)
- Occupation: Politician; professor; lawyer

Giorgos Gerapetritis (Greek: Γιώργος Γεραπετρίτης; born 26 June 1967) is a Greek politician, professor and lawyer serving as Minister for Foreign Affairs since June 2023. He previously served as Minister of State from 2019 to 2023 and as Minister of Infrastructure and Transport from March to May 2023. A member of New Democracy, he was a member of the Hellenic Parliament from 2019 to 2023.

Born in Karpathos, Gerapetritis attended Ionideios Model High School of Piraeus and later studied at the National and Kapodistrian University of Athens. He earned his master's degree in public law at the University of Edinburgh and his doctorate in law from the University of Oxford. He then became a Chevening Scholar of the British Council for postgraduate research and a Fellow at the French Conseil d’Etat. He was a Visiting Fellow at the Institute of Global Law and Policy at Harvard Law School, and has been a professor of constitutional law in the faculty of law at the University of Athens since 2003. In his legal career, Gerapetritis was the Legal Counsel to the Minister of Foreign Affairs from 2002 to 2003 and also to the Minister of Education and Religions from 2007 to 2008. He was also Legal Counsel to the Prime Minister's office from 2009 to 2010.

Gerapetritis was elected to the Hellenic Parliament at the 2019 Greek legislative election, and was appointed Minister of State under Prime Minister Kyriakos Mitsotakis shortly after his election. He became the acting Minister of Infrastructure and Transport in March 2023 after the resignation of his predecessor, Kostas Karamanlis, following the Tempi train crash. He served in both ministerial positions until the dissolution of the First Mitsotakis Cabinet in May 2023. He returned to the government in the Second Mitsotakis Cabinet in June of the same year as Minister for Foreign Affairs. His tenure as foreign minister has come amidst several foreign conflicts, notably the Russian invasion of Ukraine and the Gaza war. His tenure has also overseen closer relations with Turkey, as well as with the United States and other European countries. He has advocated for the return of the Elgin Marbles to Greece, and also overseen Greece's successful candidacy to become a non-permanent member of the UN Security Council for the 2025–26 term.

== Early life and education ==
Gerapetritis was born in Karpathos on 26 June 1967 and grew up in Piraeus. He graduated from the Ionideios Model High School of Piraeus in 1985.

Gerapetritis studied at the law school of the National and Kapodistrian University of Athens and graduated in 1989. He earned his master's degree in public law at the University of Edinburgh and his doctorate in law from the University of Oxford in 1995.

== Career ==
=== Academic ===
From 1992 to 1994, Gerapetritis was a Scholar of the Hellenic Scholarship Foundation for postgraduate research in the United Kingdom, France and Belgium. In 1995, he was Chevening Scholar of the British Council for postgraduate research in the United Kingdom and also a Fellow at the French Conseil d’Etat. In 2003, he was a German Marshal Memorial Fund Fellow and in 2012 he was a Visiting Fellow at the Institute of Global Law and Policy at Harvard Law School. From 2015 to 2016, he was a Visiting Fellow at the Institute of European and Comparative Law at the University of Oxford and also a Visiting Scholar at the Institute of Advanced Legal Studies at the University of London.

Since 2003, Gerapetritis has been a professor of Constitutional Law in the Faculty of Law at the University of Athens. He has also been Director of the Department of Public Law and Member of the Rectorship of at the Faculty of Law of the University of Athens since 2016.

=== Public administration ===
From 2002 to 2003, Gerapetritis was the Legal Counsel to the Minister of Foreign Affairs and from 2004 to 2008 he was the representative of the Ministry of Foreign Affairs in the European Network and for the improvement of Higher Education. From 2007 to 2010, he was the representative of the Ministry of Justice in the Group of States against Corruption and from 2007 to 2008 he was the Legal Counsel to the Minister of Education and Religions. He was also Legal Counsel to the Prime Minister's office from 2009 to 2010.

=== Organisations ===
Since 2016, Gerapetritis has been a member of the executive committee of the European Public Law Organisation and also of the European Group of Public Law. With Ant. Sakkoulas Publications, he has been a Publication Research Fellow of the Commentary of the Constitution since 2003, Research Collaborator of the journal Human Rights since 1998 and a member of the Editorial Committee of the journal The Constitution since 2004. He has also been a researcher at the Hellenic and Foreign Law Institute since 2004 and General Secretary of the Hellenic Union for the Democracy and the Legislation since 2003.

Gerapetritis was a member of the Board of the National Commission for Human Rights of the Hellenic Republic from 2015 to 2018. In 2006, he was a Legal expert of the Council of Europe in the national coordination in the fields of Local Government and Legislation and was Director of Research at Transparency International-Greece from 2002 to 2007.

=== Legal and political ===
Gerapetritis is an Attorney at Law and member of the Piraeus Association Bar, pleading before the Hellenic Council of State, the Court of Justice of the European Union and the European Court of Human Rights. He specialises in public law, EU law, administrative law, human rights law and telecommunications law.

In the 2019 Greek legislative election, he was elected as a member of parliament. On 9 July 2019, he was appointed Minister of State under Prime Minister Kyriakos Mitsotakis. On 1 March 2023, after the resignation of Kostas Karamanlis following the Tempi train crash, he became the Minister of Infrastructure and Transport.

== Foreign minister (2023–present) ==
=== Appointment and early tenure ===
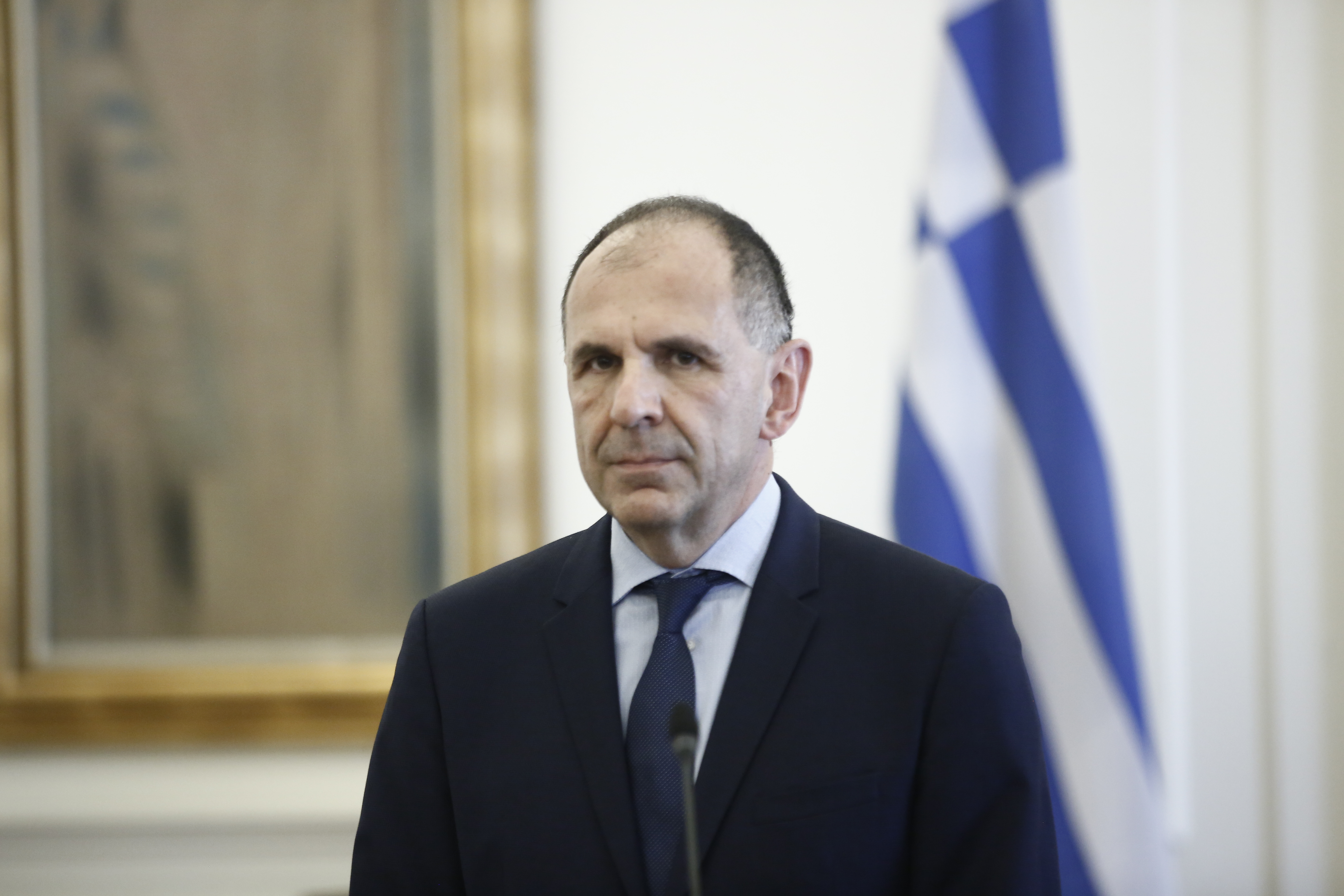
Gerapetritis after his appointment as Foreign Affairs Minister, 27 June 2023

Gerapetritis was appointed Minister of Foreign Affairs on 27 June 2023 under Prime Minister Kyriakos Mitsotakis in the Second Cabinet of Kyriakos Mitsotakis.

The first official visit abroad Gerapetritis went on was to Cyprus on 4 July. He was initially received by President Nikos Christodoulides, before meeting with his counterpart the Cypriot Foreign Minoster Constantinos Kombos. In joint statements with Kombos, Gerapetritis stated that the Cyprus issue was a "top national foreign policy priority" for Greece, and also said that the solution must be "functional and grant the reunited Cyprus Republic the future it deserves." Gerapetritis also stated that they were living in "historic moments" and that the circumstances were "significant" and quite "challenging regionally and internationally." Additionally, Gerapetritis also discussed the steps taken by Greece and Cyprus in building deeper ties with regional allies, particularly Israel.

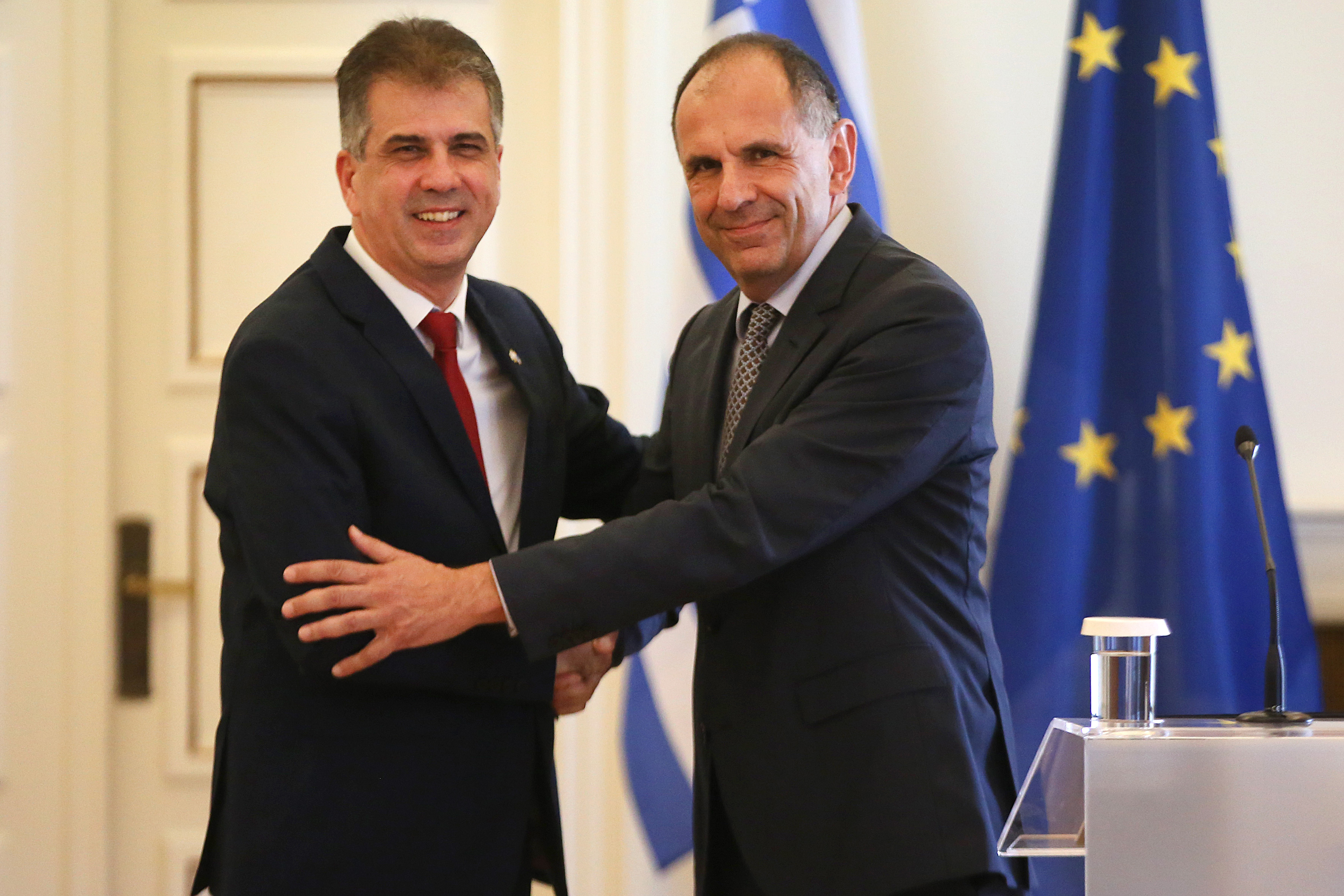
Gerapetritis with Israeli Foreign Minister Eli Cohen on 4 July 2023.

On 6 July, Gerapetritis received Israeli Foreign Minister Eli Cohen in Athens. After their meeting during joint statements, Gerapetritis stated regarding developments in the region that "it is clear that violence is not the solution nor the answer" and went on to reiterate Greece's position that Greece are "in favour of a mutually accepted solution for the Palestine issue." Gerapetritis also said that they discussed the trilateral cooperation with Cyprus, and that he believed Greece, Israel, Cyprus and the United States are states that are "united with common interests and common values."

On 8 July, in an address to the Hellenic Parliament, Gerapetritis stated that Greece would do whatever is necessary to end the detention of Mayor Fredis Beleris, adding that Albania "must respect the rule of law" if it wanted to become a "member of the European family." Gerapetritis also welcomed Finland's accession to NATO and expressed support for Sweden's accession to NATO, as well as continuing to support Ukraine and the "full restoration of its territorial integrity."

=== North America ===
==== United States ====
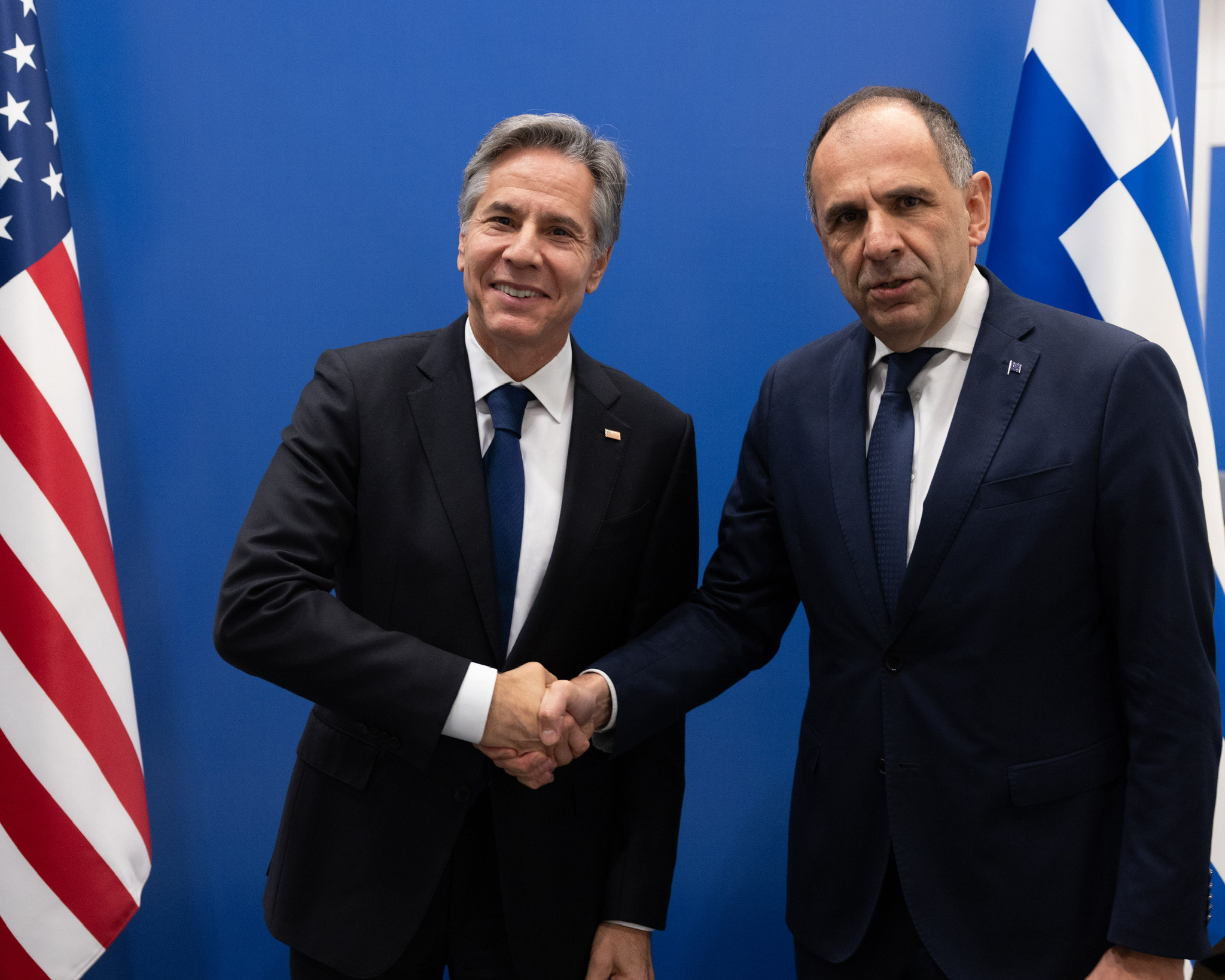
Gerapetritis with Secretary Antony Blinken on 28 November 2023

On 24 September 2023, Gerapetritis met with former U.S. Presidential candidate and Governor Michael Dukakis in Brookline in Boston. Gerapetritis thanked Dukakis on his role in promoting Greece–United States relations, and their discussion focused on development in Greece and improving the economy there. They also discussed climate change as well as the need for global action to address the consequences of it.

On 6 January 2024, Gerapetritis received U.S. Secretary of State Antony Blinken on the island of Crete before Blinken met with Prime Minister Mitsotakis. Gerapetritis later also attended a cooperation meeting with Deputy Foreign Minister Alexandra Papadopoulou, U.S. Ambassador to Greece George Tsunis and U.S. State Department Deputy Spokesperson Tom Sullivan.

On 9 February 2024, Gerapetritis signed Greece up to the Artemis Accords, a set of principles which guide space exploration cooperation amongst countries. Greece became the 35th country to sign up to the Accords, and Gerapetritis said that the signing of the Accords was "in order to just be together not only on Earth but also in space." At the meeting with U.S. Secretary of State Antony Blinken in Washington, he also stated that "what is urgently needed is global cooperation based on ethical commitments and the authority of international law" and that they "actively support EU enlargement to the Western Balkans and Ukraine." He also addressed an event at the Wilson Centre titled "Our Ocean Countdown, Greece 2024: An Ocean of Potential" where he participated in discussion with the United States Special Presidential Envoy for Climate, John Kerry.

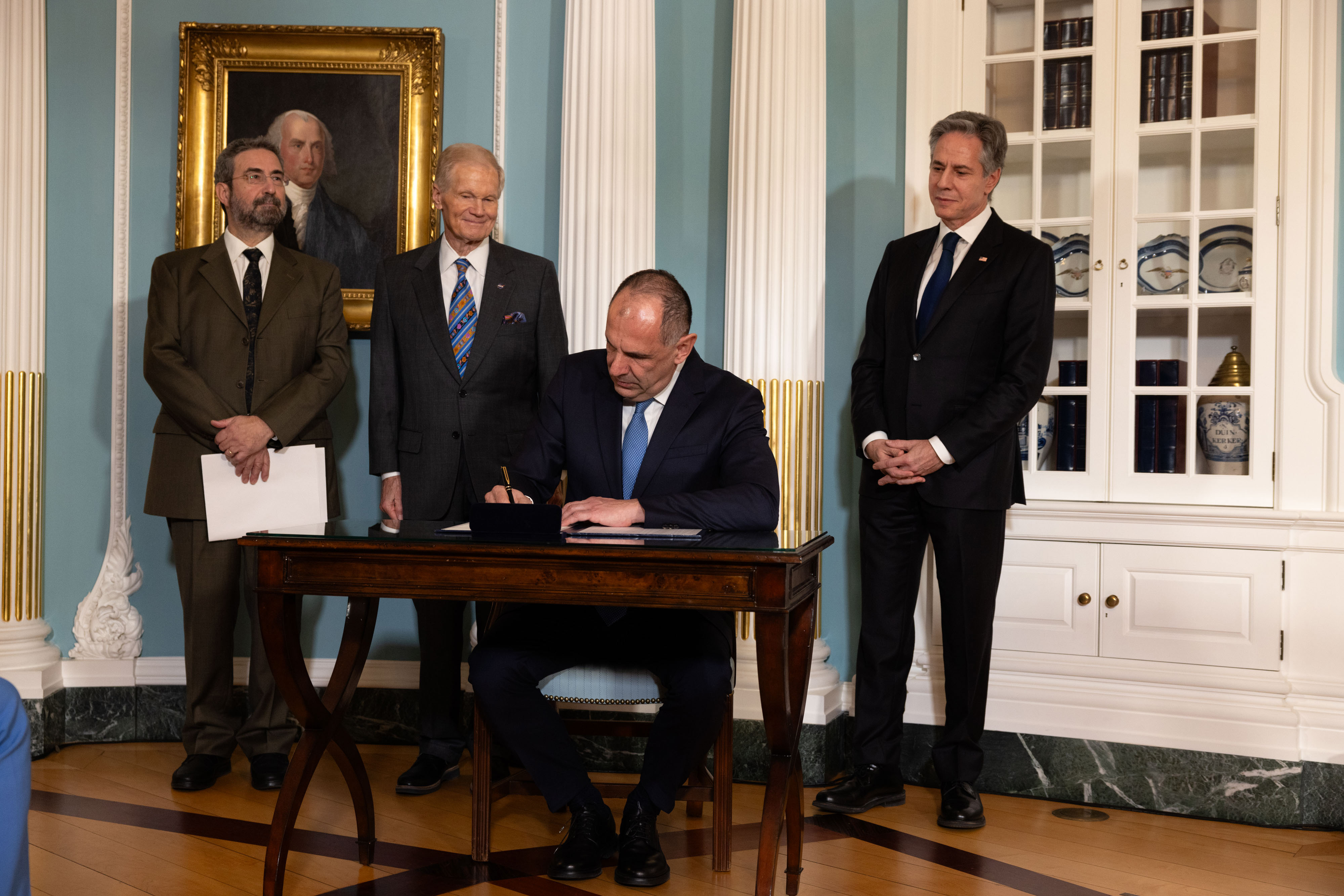
Gerapetritis signing the Artemis Accords alongside Secretary of State Antony Blinken, President of the Hellenic Space Center, Ioannis Daglis, and NASA Administrator Bill Nelson at the Department of State in Washington on 9 February 2024.

On 18 March 2024, Gerapetritis had a teleconference with Blinken whilst he attended the Foreign Affairs Council in Brussels. They reportedly discussed the instability in the Red Sea region, and the role of Greece in helping to promote security in the region, as well as the importance of the agreement between the EU and Egypt in helping to promote security at sea.

On 20 June 2024, Gerapetritis met with a delegation from the United States led by Republican U.S. Representative and Chair of the Homeland Security Committee, Mark Green, in Athens. The delegation Gerapetritis met with included Republicans Michael Guest, Alex Mooney and Debbie Lesko, and Democrats Zoe Lofgren and Norma Torres, who were accompanied by Ambassador Tsunis. Gerapetritis said that Greek-American relations were at an all-time high, as well as highlighting that Greece's foreign policy remained based on international law. Talks between Gerapetritis and the delegation focused on Greece–Turkey relations and the Cyprus issue, as well as the conflicts in Ukraine and Gaza and also Greece's efforts to become independent in energy.

On 26 February 2025, Gerapetritis held meetings with American members of Congress in Washington, D.C, including the Chair of the Senate Foreign Relations Committee, Jim Risch, the Ranking Member of the Senate Foreign Relations Committee, Jeanne Shaheen, the Chair of the House Foreign Affairs Committee, Brian Mast, and the Ranking Member of the House Foreign Affairs Committee, Gregory Meeks. The discussions held focused on the promotion of Greece as an investment destination and also its role as an energy hub in the Eastern Mediterranean. Gerapetritis also met with Greek-American members of Congress, Dina Titus, Gus Bilirakis and Chris Pappas, and held separate meetings with Senators Chris Van Hollen and Cory Booker on 27 February.

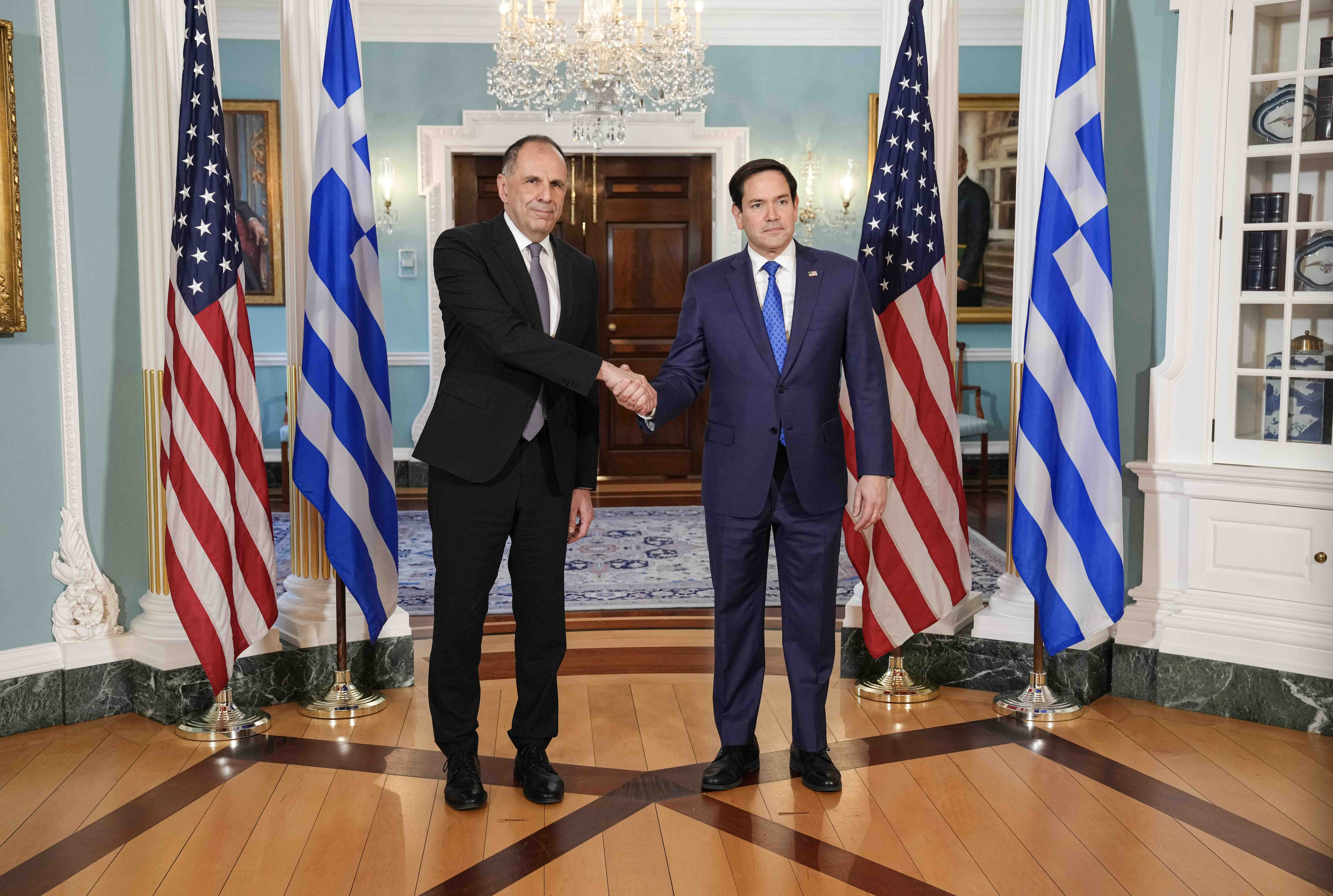
Gerapetritis and Secretary Marco Rubio on 28 February 2025.

On 28 February 2025, Gerapetritis met for the first time with new U.S. Secretary of State, Marco Rubio, at the State Department. Their meeting occurred just hours after the Trump–Zelenskyy Oval Office meeting, which Gerapetritis described as a "public confrontation". In their meeting, Rubio and Gerapetritis discussed the strategic relationship between the two countries, and also the importance of confronting illegal migration. Gerapetritis also asserted that regardless of the public confrontation between Trump and Zelenskyy, Europe remained obligated to "upgrade its defense infrastructure", but also said that the support of the United States was "necessary". They also discussed the leadership of Greece in regional energy projects and the prospect of future cooperation. Rubio and Gerapetritis also discussed foreign affairs including the war in Ukraine and also the Middle East, as well as opportunities to strengthen bilateral relations.

==== Canada ====
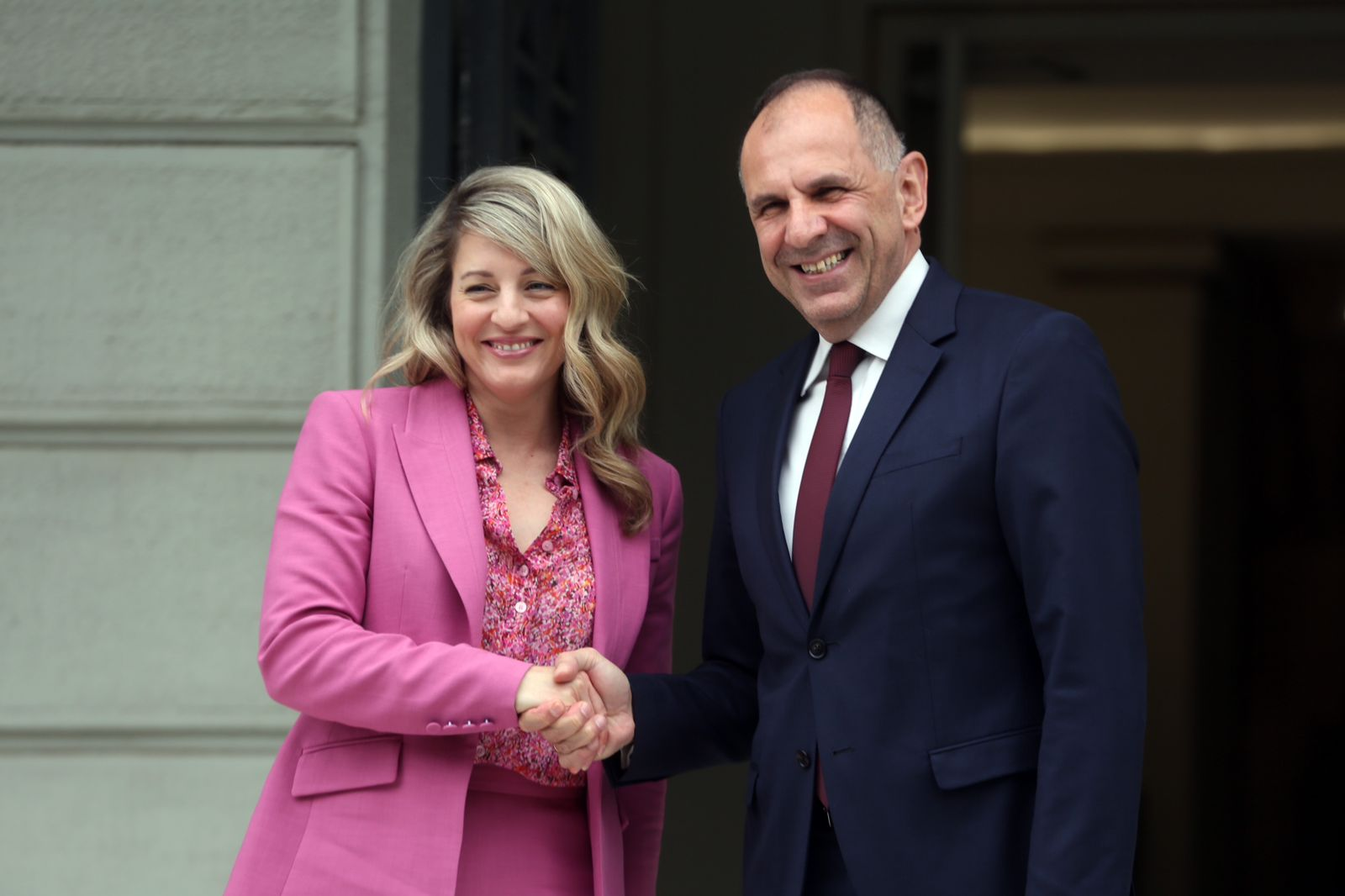
Gerapetritis with Mélanie Joly on 17 May 2024

On 17 May 2024, Gerapetritis met with the Canadian Minister of Foreign Affairs, Mélanie Joly, in Athens. After their meeting, Gerapetritis said in their statements that the two countries are linked by "common understanding and shared principles based on the defence of democracy, the rule of law and humanitarianism" and that "Greece and Canada have stood from the outset together against revisionism."

=== Middle East ===
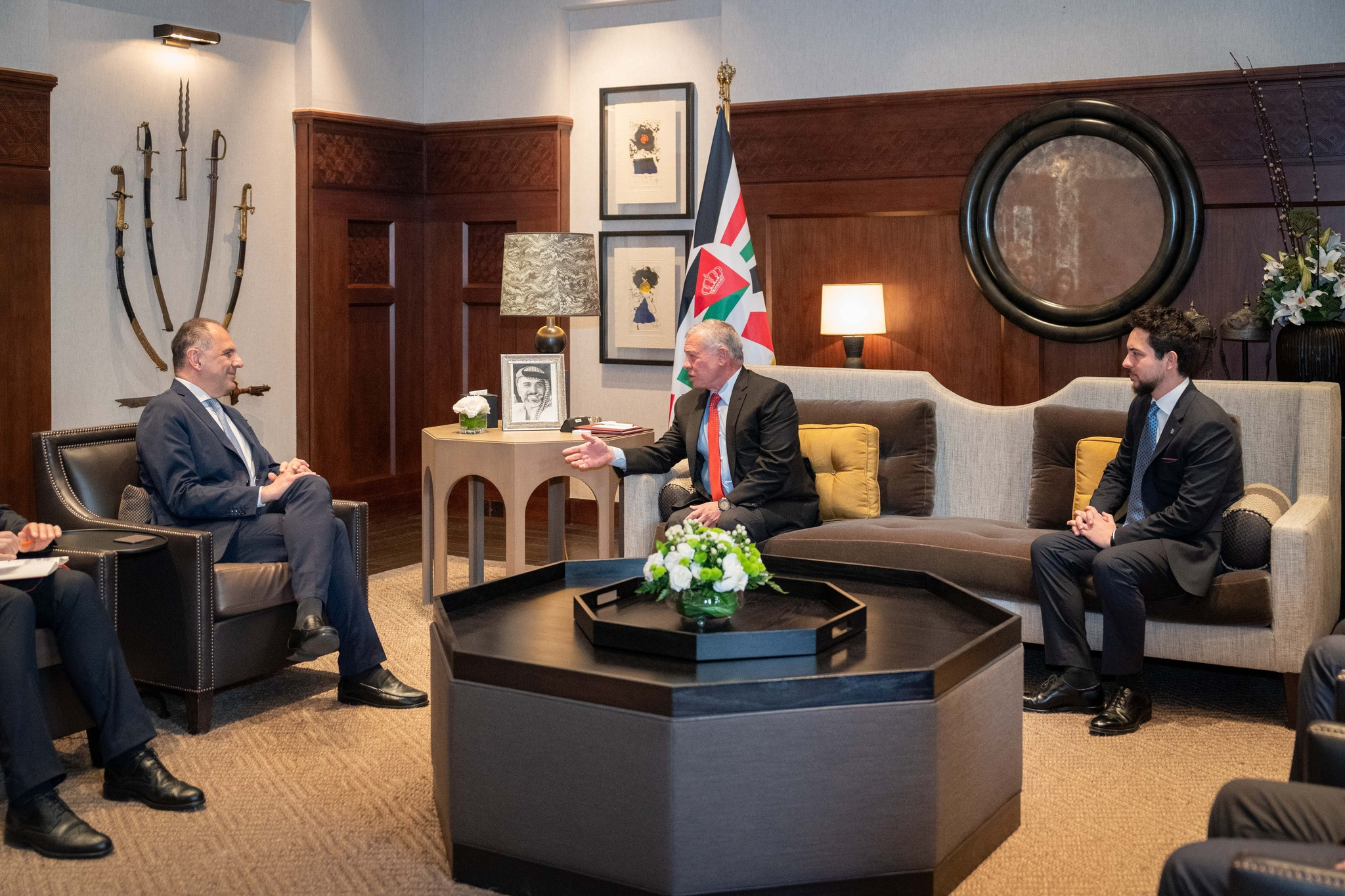
Gerapetritis meeting with King Abdullah II of Jordan and Crown Prince Hussein of Jordan on 16 January 2024

On 11 January 2024, Gerapetritis travelled to Riyadh in Saudi Arabia where he met his counterpart Prince Faisal bin Farhan Al Saud. They discussed international developments and also the Middle East issue, with Gerapetritis stating that they looked for ways they could "establish humanitarian help."

On 15 January 2024, Gerapetritis travelled to Amman in Jordan where he met his counterpart, Deputy Prime Minister Ayman Safadi, and they focused on discussing the situation in Gaza and also strengthening coordination between the two countries. The following day, Gerapetritis met with King Abdullah II of Jordan, Crown Prince Hussein of Jordan, Jafar Hassan and Safadi where they discussed the situation in Gaza and also the importance of protecting civilians.

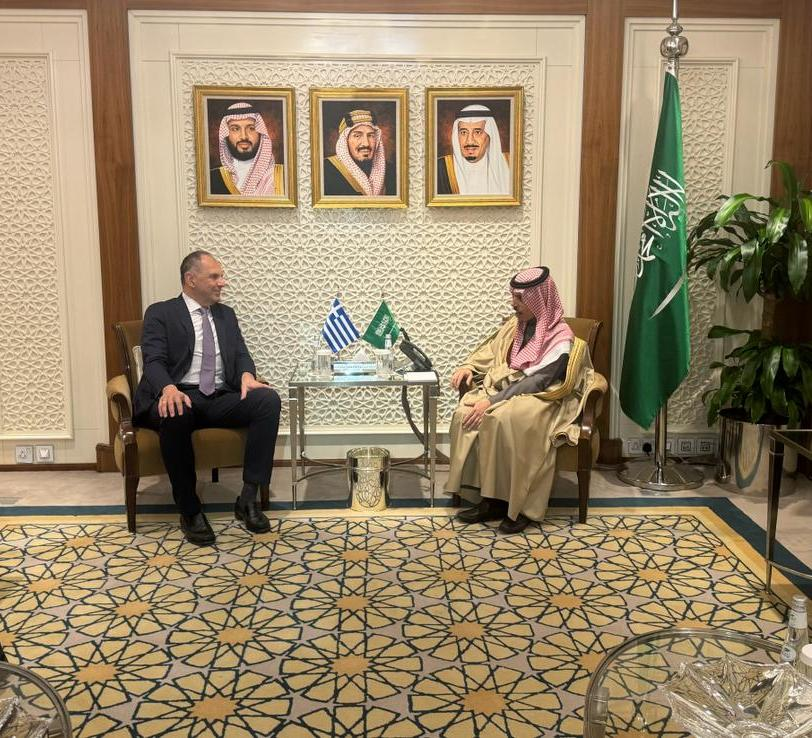
Gerapetritis with Saudi Foreign Minister Faisal bin Farhan Al Saud in Riyadh, Saudi Arabia on 11 January 2024

On 24 April 2024, Gerapetritis travelled to Qatar, becoming the first Greek foreign Minister in five years to visit Doha. He met with the Prime Minister and Foreign Affairs Minister of Qatar, Mohammed bin Abdulrahman bin Jassim Al Thani, and they discussed the cooperation between the two countries and also ways for de-escalation in the region. On 25 April, he travelled to Kuwait where he met his counterpart, Abdullah Ali Al-Yahya, with Gerapetritis highlighting the role Kuwait plays in stabilising the region and also highlighting Greece's efforts to contribute in the humanitarian crisis in Gaza.

On 11 June 2024, after his participation in the International Conference on Gaza, Gerapetritis said that Greece would "undertake a series of initiatives to achieve beneficial outcomes in the Middle East." He proposed the establishment of a special group of foreign ministers from the EU and Arab world to assist in establishing peace.

=== Climate Change ===
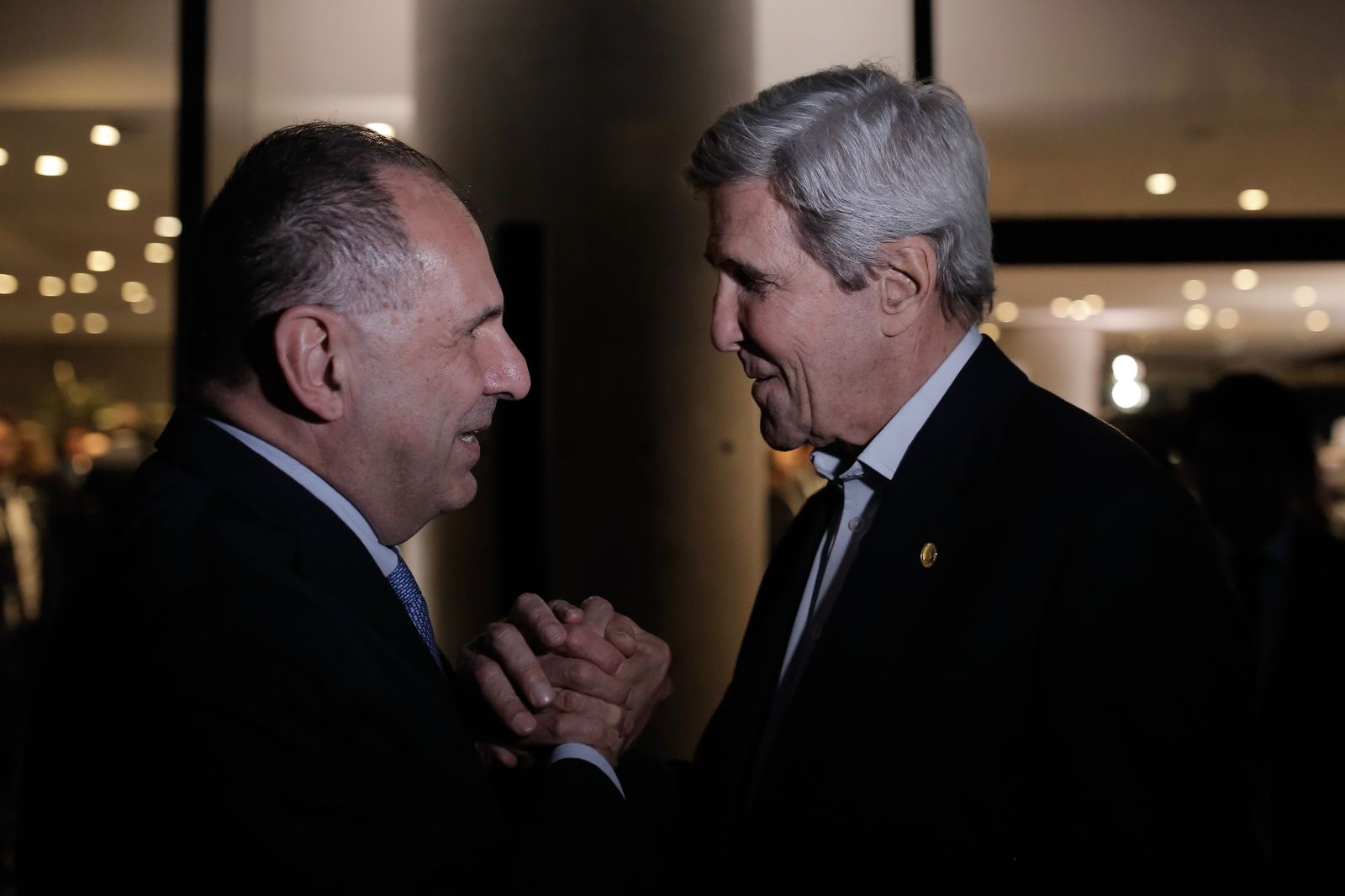
Gerapetritis with John Kerry on 15 April 2024

On 13 February 2024, in an official visit to the UN headquarters, Gerapetritis addressed the UN security council in a debate on the impact of climate change and food insecurity on the maintenance of international peace and security. In the debate, he noted that "in the contemporary world, there is not a single challenge that does not interact with others."

On 16 April 2024, the second day of the 9th Conference on Oceans and Climate Change took place in Athens attended by John Kerry, and Gerapetritis delivered the opening address of the conference. Gerapetritis reaffirmed Greece's commitment towards the transition to a "blue economy." He also stated that "we must not forget we are not the owners, but merely the caretakers of the Earth" and asked for all to "commit to a better future for the next generations."

=== United Kingdom ===
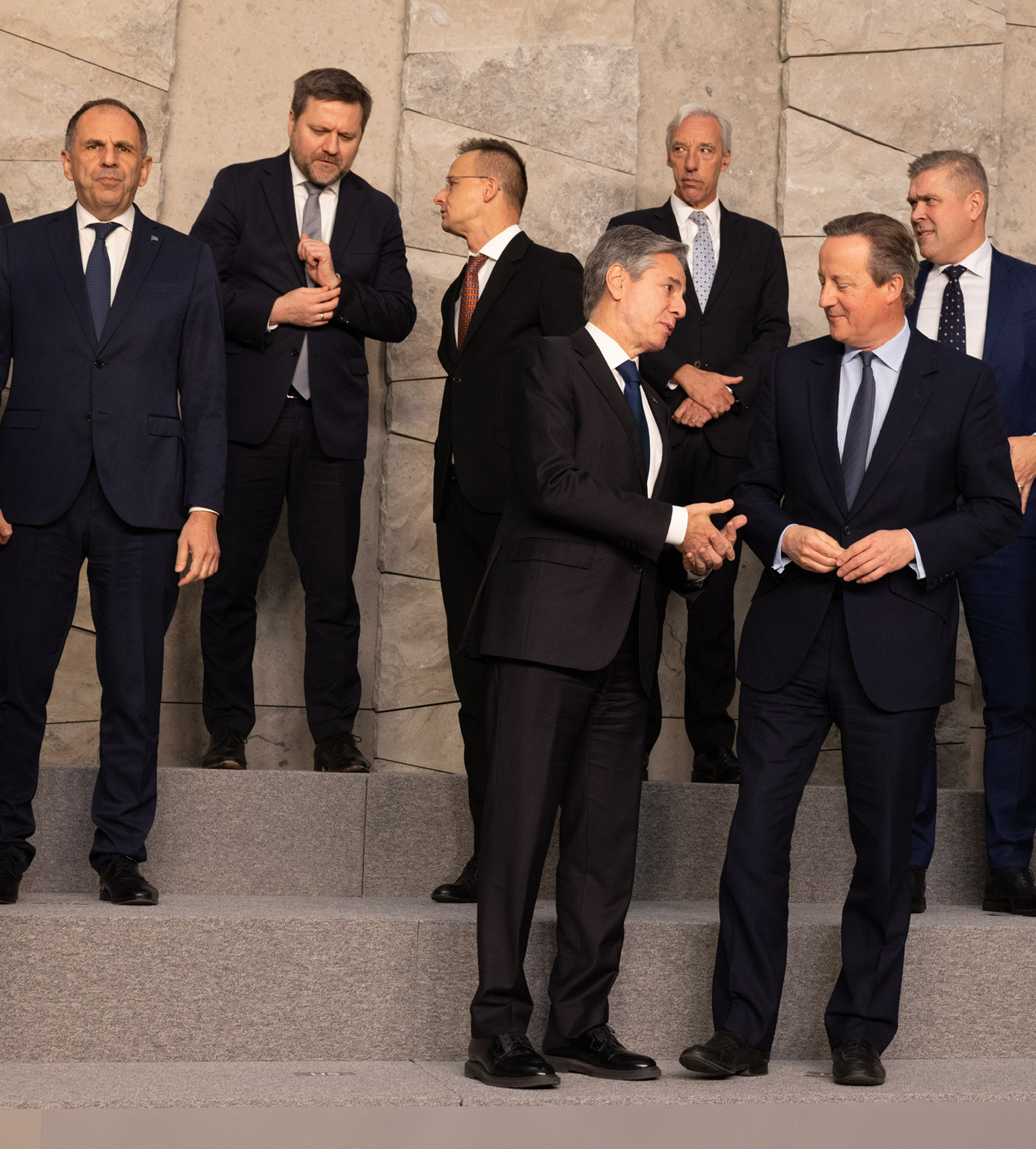
Gerapetritis (standing left) and British Foreign Secretary David Cameron (front row right), at the NATO summit where they later met on the sidelines of, on 28 November 2023.

==== Elgin Marbles dispute ====
In November 2023, Prime Minister Mitsotakis was due to meet British Prime Minister Rishi Sunak, before Sunak cancelled the meeting. Mitsotakis was offered a meeting instead with British Deputy Prime Minister Oliver Dowden, which he declined. This came amidst Mitsotakis publicly asking that the Elgin Marbles (also called the Parthenon Marbles) be returned from the British Museum to Greece. Downing Street said that the talks had only been agreed on the basis that Greece would not publicly lobby for Elgin Marbles, but this notion was rejected by Greek labour Minister Adonis Georgiades.

In response to the diplomatic row, on 27 November at an event at the London School of Economics, Gerapetritis is reported to have said that "if Hamas can converse with Israel then Sunak can converse with Mitsotakis too." The following day on 28 November, Gerapetritis was attending the NATO summit in Brussels alongside other Foreign Ministers, including the British Foreign Secretary David Cameron. In response to the dispute, a meeting was arranged between Gerapetritis and Cameron on the sidelines of the summit at Cameron's request; with there being no cameras; which Gerapetritis agreed to. They reportedly disagreed over the return of the Elgin Marbles to Greece, but agreed on the need for cooperation between the two countries to safeguard bilateral relations.

On 29 November, Gerapetritis said that he hoped the two countries could find a solution to return the marbles to Greece. He argued that "the reunification of the Parthenon sculpture is a claim based not only on history and justice but also on ecumenical cultural value."

=== NATO ===
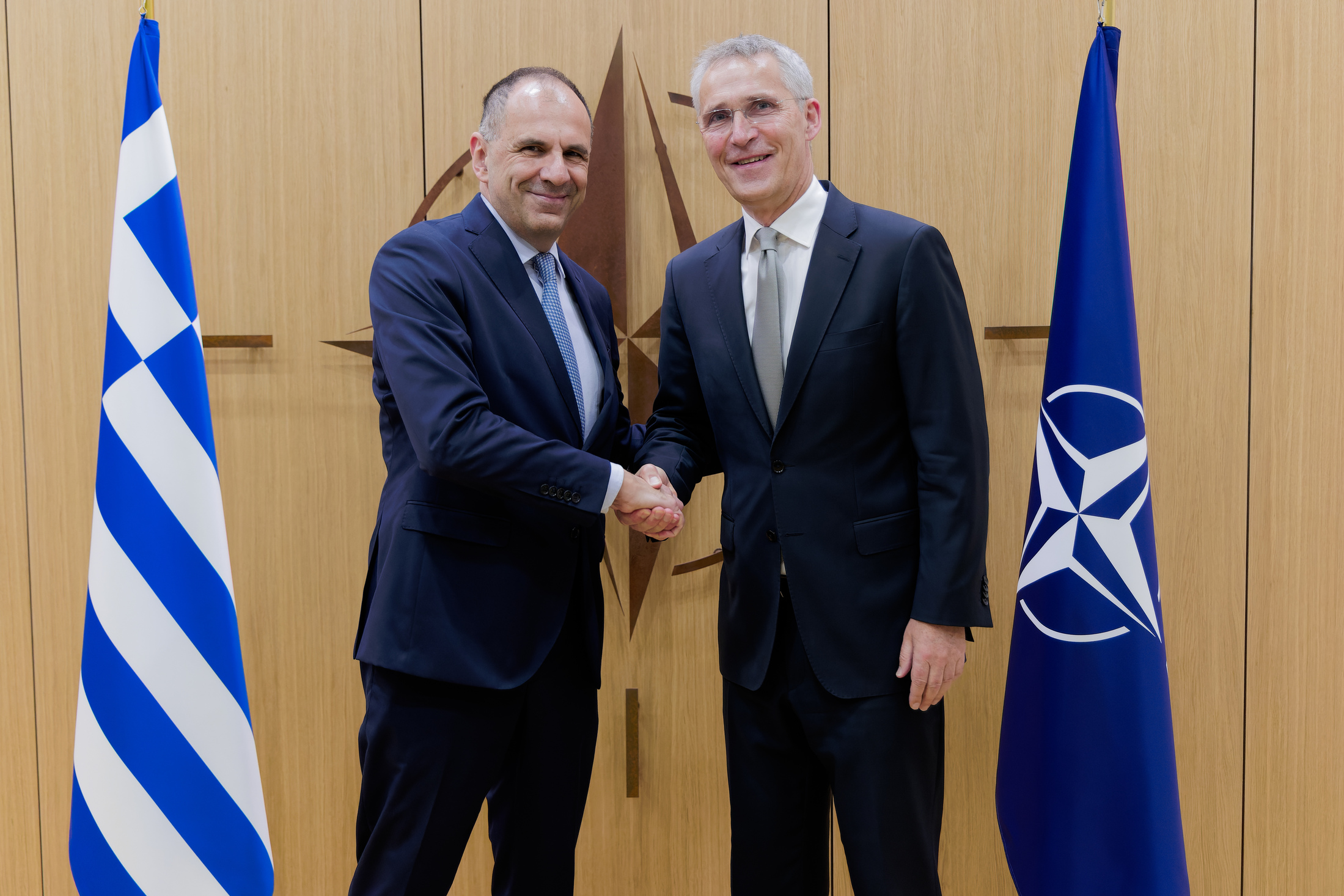
Gerapetritis with Secretary General of NATO, Jens Stoltenberg, in Brussels on 20 July 2023.

On 11 and 12 July 2023, Gerapetritis attended the NATO summit in Vilnius, along with Prime Minister Mitsotakis. On the sidelines of the summit, he met with Macedonian Foreign Minister Bujar Osmani for the first time, and they discussed bilateral relations and stronger sectoral cooperation, as well as cooperation in the gas and energy connection between the two countries. Gerapetritis also met with the Georgian Foreign Minister Ilia Darchiashvili and they discussed the cooperation between the two countries and the security environment created in the region, as well as the role of Georgia as a partner of NATO. Gerapetritis also met with his Estonian counterpart, Margus Tsahkna, and they discussed the ways to strengthen the bilateral cooperation between the two countries and the cooperation between them within the EU, as well as discussing the Organization for Security and Co-operation in Europe (OSCE).

On 20 July 2023, Gerapetritis had his first working meeting with the Secretary General of NATO, Jens Stoltenberg, at the NATO headquarters in Brussels. After his meeting with Stoltenberg, Gerapetritis said that NATO should focus more attention on developments in the "Southern Neighbourhood, the Middle East and the Eastern Mediterranean."

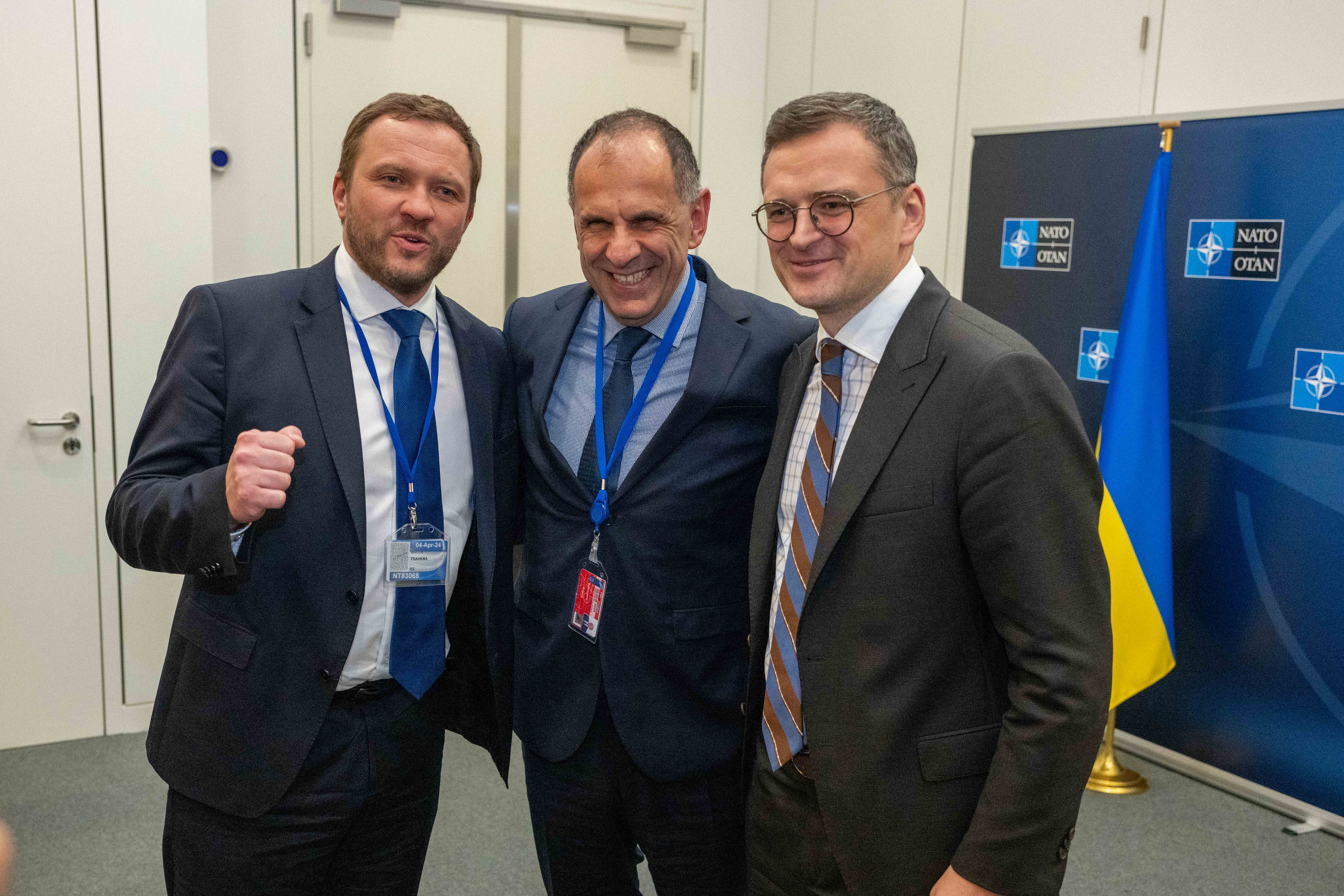
Gerapetritism with Dmytro Kuleba and Margus Tsahkna at the April 2024 meeting of NATO Foreign Ministers.

On 28 and 29 November 2023, Gerapetritis attended the NATO Foreign Ministers summit held in Brussels. He focused on NATO-Ukraine and on the support that Greece provides to Ukraine, as well as reffirming the support of Greece to Ukraine. Additionally, he emphasised the role of stability that Greece provided in the Western Balkans, as well as discussing the threats that NATO faces from the South and also following developments in the Middle East.

In April 2024, Gerapetritis attended the NATO Foreign Ministers meeting in Brussels which focused on military support and aid for Ukraine. On the sidelines of the meeting, Gerapetritis met with his Turkish counterpart Hakan Fidan where they discussed the bilateral relations between the two countries as well as regional and international issues. He also met with Ukrainian Foreign Minister Dmytro Kuleba, on the sidelines of the meeting.

=== United Nations ===
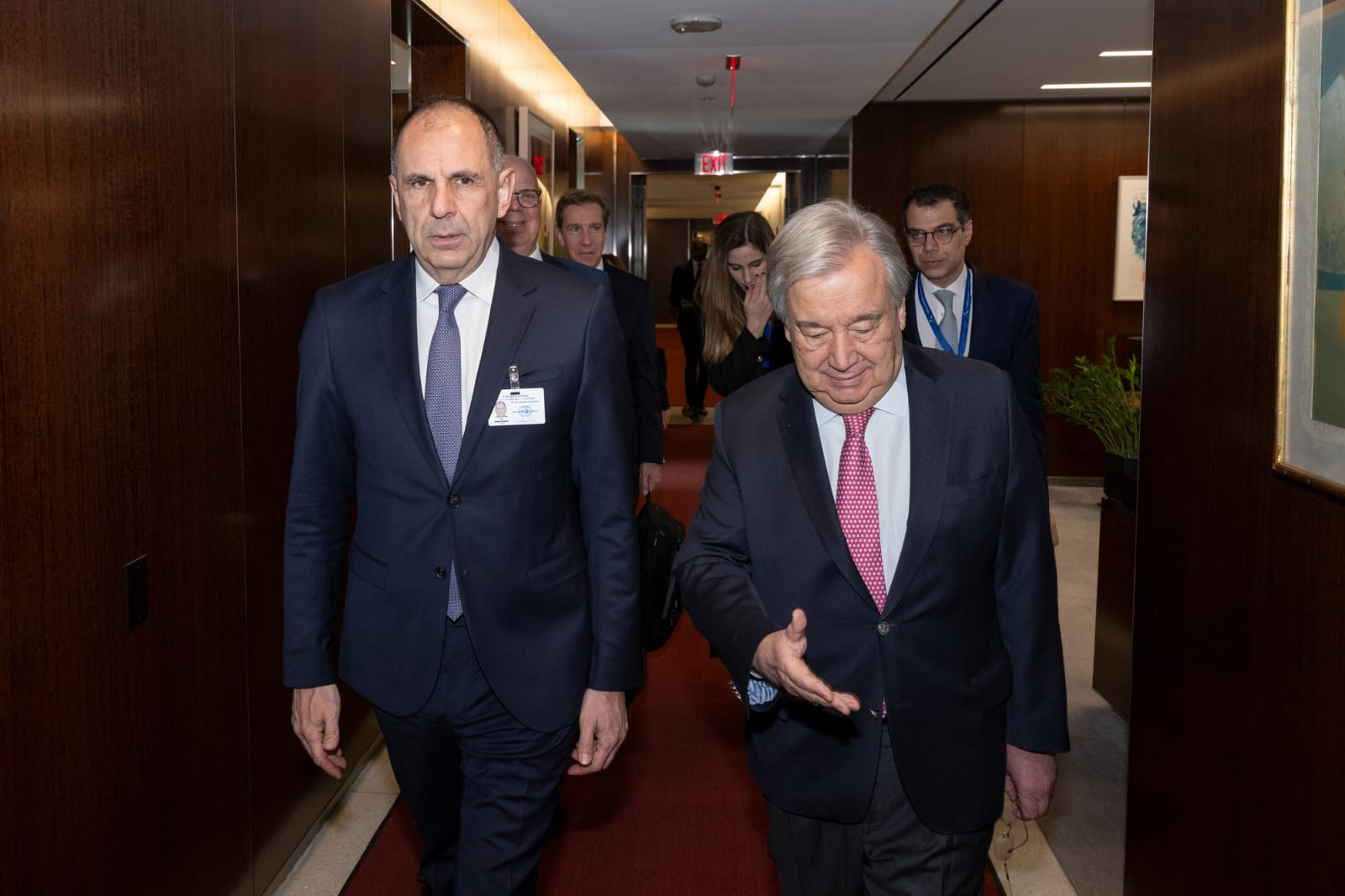
Gerapetritis with António Guterres on 12 February 2024

On 28 September 2023, Gerapetritis concluded a visit to New York where he participated in the Seventy-eighth session of the United Nations General Assembly. During his visit, he met with President of the UN General Assembly, Dennis Francis, Secretary General Marija Pejčinović Burić, and EU Commissioner for Home Affairs Ylva Johansson, amongst other officials. He also accompanied Mitsotakis to meet UN Secretary General António Guterres and also promoted the candidacy of Greece in the 2024 United Nations Security Council election on his visit. He also met with the Turkish Minister of Foreign Affairs, Hakan Fidan, and also attended a meeting between Recep Tayyip Erdoğan and Prime Minister Mitsotakis.

On 12 and 13 February 2024, Gerapetritis went to New York where he promoted the candidacy of Greece to become a non-permanent member of the United Nations Security Council. He met with Secretary General Guterres on 12 February, and after their meeting said that they had focused on the Cyprus issue. He also met with the Permanent Missions of the Caribbean Community (CARICOM) and with the Permanent Representatives of the Pacific Small Island Developing States (Pacific SIDS) where he presented the priorities of the candidacy of Greece.

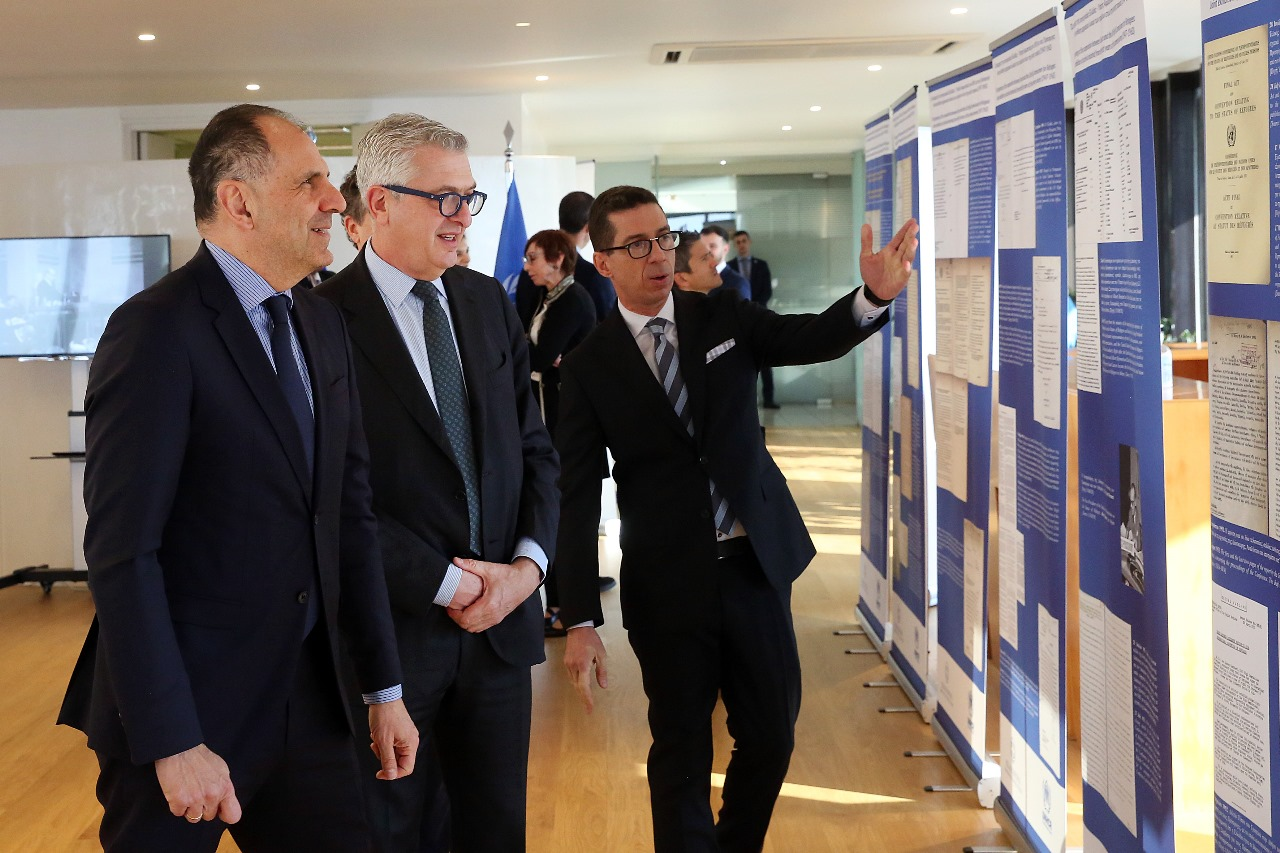
Gerapetritis with Filippo Grandi on 19 February 2024 in Athens.

On 19 February 2024, Gerapetritis met with the UN High Commissioner for Refugees, Filippo Grandi, in Athens. Gerapetritis and Grandi subsequently signed a Host Country Agreement on behalf of Greece and the UN High Commission for Refugees (UNCHR), which facilitated the operations of UNCHR in Greece and strengthened the collaboration between Greece and the organisation.

On 28 February 2024, Gerapetritis travelled to Geneva where he participated in a segment of the 55th United Nations Human Rights Council. He continued to promote Greece's candidacy to become a non-permanent member of the UN Security Council for the 2025–26 term, as well as for Greece's membership on the Human Rights Council for the 2028–2030 period. On the sidelines, he met with UN High Commissioner for Human Rights, Volker Türk, and their talks focused on developments at the time.

In June 2024, Gerapetritis travelled to New York where he met with Secretary General Guterres on 5 June ahead of the 2024 United Nations Security Council election. On 6 June, Greece was elected a non-permanent member, garnering 182 out of 188 votes from the General Assembly. After the election, Gerapetritis described it as a "historic day" for Greece and said that it was a "great success." He subsequently outlined Greece's six priorities as a non-permanent member of the UN Security Council which included the peaceful settlement of disputes; the respect for international law and the rules of the UN charter; the implementation of Women, Peace and Security Agenda; climate change and security; maritime security; and the protection of the rights of children in armed conflict.

=== France ===
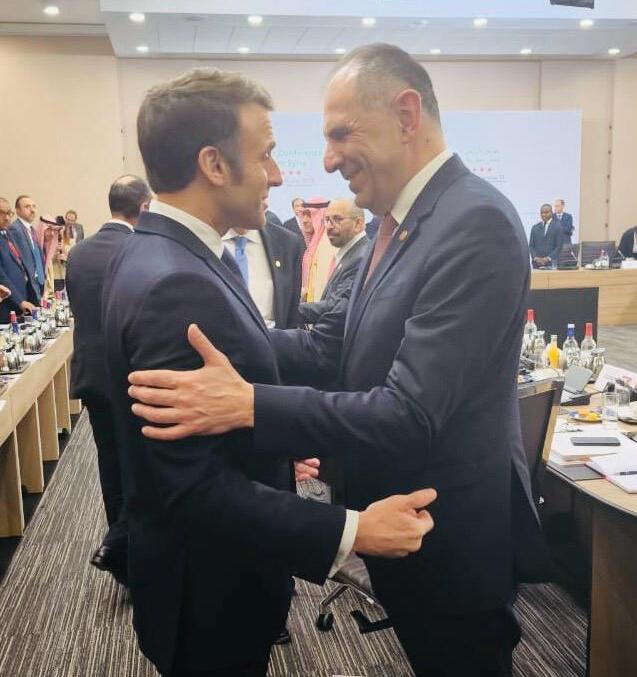
Gerapetritis with French President Emmanuel Macron on 13 February 2025.

Gerapetritis met with French Foreign Minister Stéphane Séjourné in Athens on 16 September 2024, where he called for joint European action on migration. Gerapetritis said that the "external dimension of migration" must be addressed and also called for the coordination of efforts to combat "smuggling networks". He also said that the burden of migration should be distributed equally among all European countries under the framework of the Migration and Asylum Pact. In joint statements with Séjourné, he praised France for the hosting of the Paralympic and Olympic games, as well as expressing the gratitude of Greece for the tribute to Ancient Greece during the closing ceremony of the games. He highlighted the partnership between France and Greece in NATO, the EU and also in bilateral relations between the two countries, and he also noted the support of France for Greece to be on the UN Security council. He also reemphasised the mandatory nature of the Prespa agreement, and highlighted the opportunities to strengthen cooperation in the investment, trade and energy sectors between the two countries.

Gerapetritis met with the President of France, Emmanuel Macron, at the conference on Syria in Paris on 13 February 2025.

=== Israel-Palestine conflict ===
==== 2023 ====
On 9 October 2023, following the 2023 Hamas-led attack on Israel two days prior, whilst in Oman attending the Gulf Cooperation Council Ministerial meeting, Gerapetritis described it as a "heinous attack against the fundamental principles of humanity." He also said that Israel had the "right to defend itself against such inhumane acts" and that he and his counterparts would "actively seek solutions to de-escalate the situation." Gerapetritis also stated that Greece would stand "by its people to ensure their safe repatriation." On 10 October, Gerapetritis proposed a five-point plan to de-escalate the tension in the Middle-East. The five points of the plan were; a unanimous condemnation of violence, terrorism and inhumane treatment; the immediate release of all hostages and abductees; the abstention from any act of aggression against civilians; the opening of humanitarian corridors; and the call for a special summit regarding the situation. Gerapetritis spoke to his Palestinian counterpart, Riyad al-Maliki, regarding the proposal; who subsequently endorsed the plan.

On 23 October, Gerapetritis accompanied Prime Minister Mitsotakis on a solidarity visit to Israel where a meeting with Prime Minister of Israel, Benjamin Netanyahu, took place. On 3 November, Gerapetritis spoke in Parliament where he confirmed that Greece will send its first humanitarian aid to Gaza which he described as a "highly challenging endeavour" due to the absence of a secure port in Gaza." He later called for a humanitarian pause to allow for the creation of a humanitarian corridor, whilst adding his view that Greece could be a "reliable interlocutor" between Israel and Arab countries.

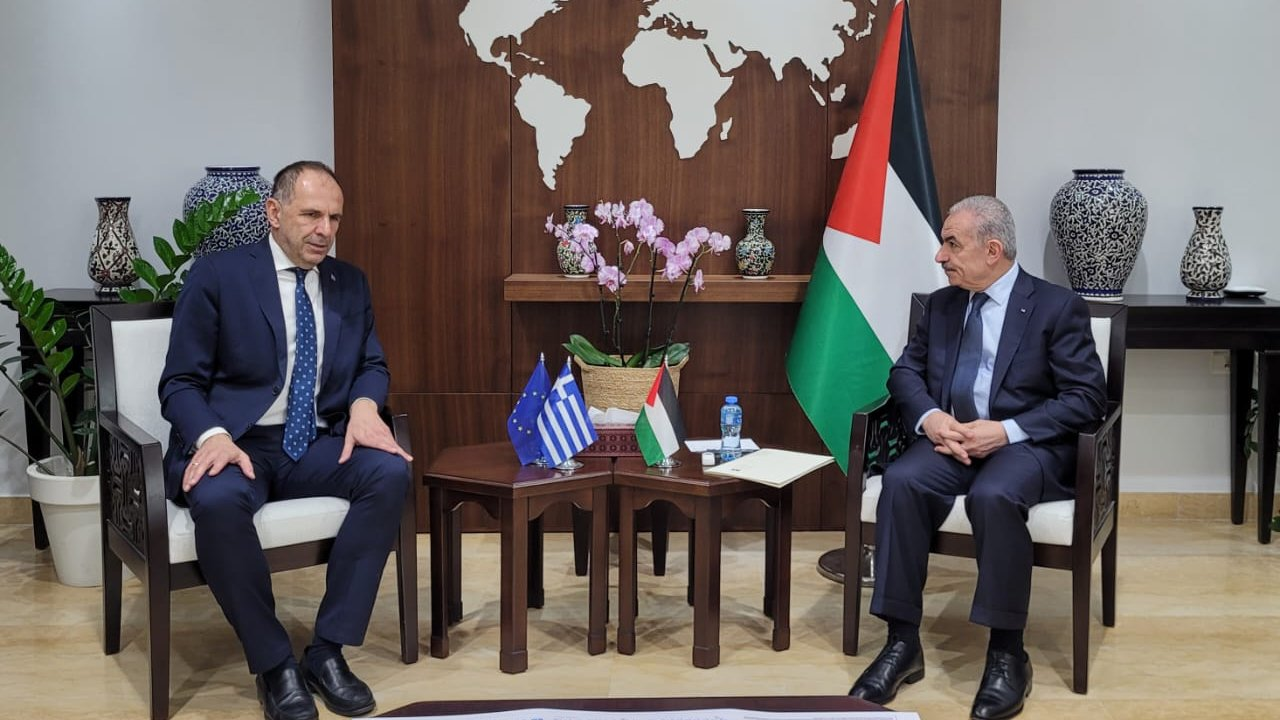
Gerapetritis with Palestinian Prime Minister Mohammad Shtayyeh on 16 November.

On 16 November, Gerapetritis travelled to Ramallah where he met with Prime Minister Mohammad Shtayyeh and Foreign Minister al-Maliki, and stressed the need for a humanitarian pause, as well as travelling to Jerusalem to meet Foreign Minister Cohen. He welcomed the agreement of a humanitarian ceasefire in Gaza and later called for its extension to allow more humanitarian aid and assistance to reach to the area. During a plenary session on 21 November, Gerapetritis said that there was "absolutely no plan" to welcome "Palestinians coming from any type of expulsion from Palestine."

==== 2024 ====
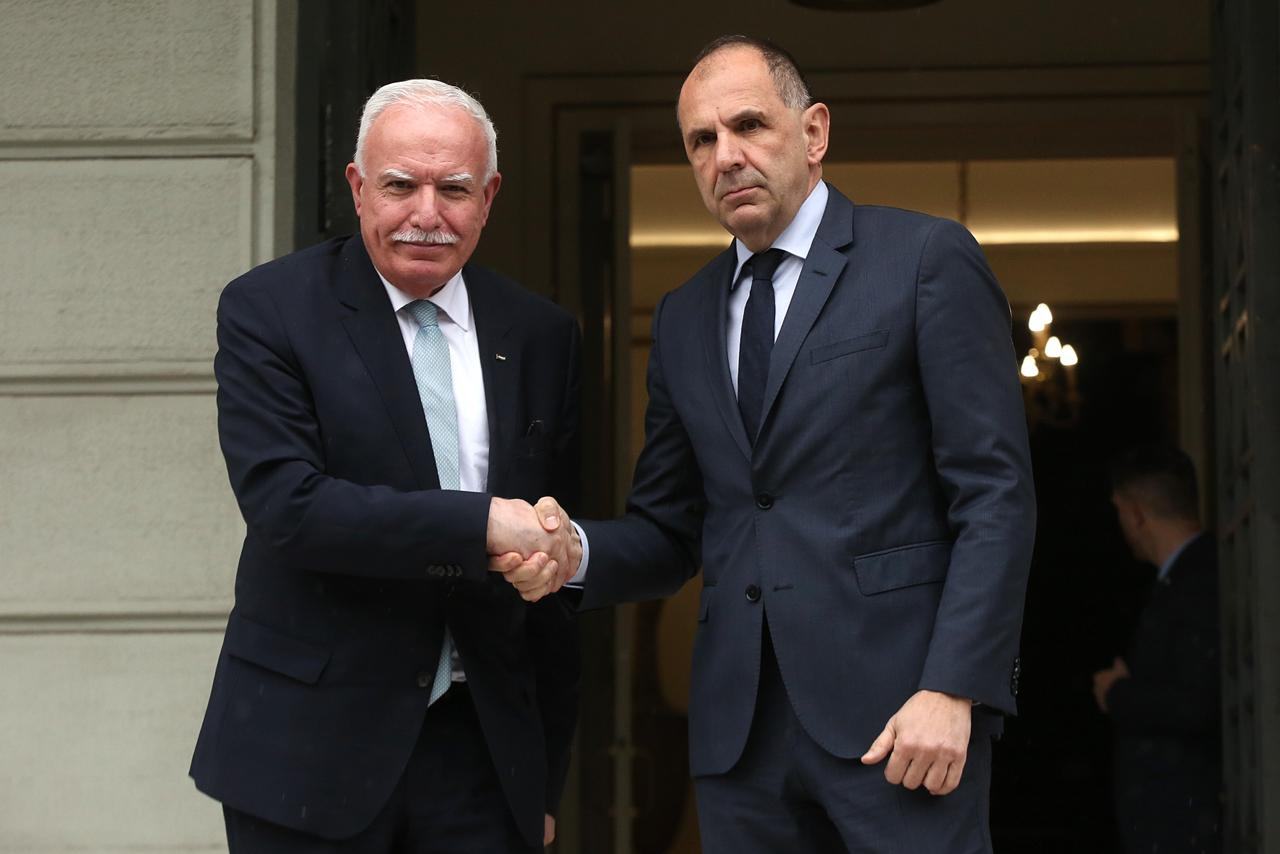
Gerapetritis with Foreign Minister Riyad al-Maliki on 15 February.

On 11 January 2024, Gerapetritis spoke with the new Israeli Foreign Minister Israel Katz and congratulated him on his appointment, whilst also reiterating Greece's support for Israel's right to defend itself within international humanitarian law but also stressing the need for the release of all hostages and the opening of sustainable humanitarian corridors. On 17 January, after a meeting with his Egyptian counterpart Sameh Shoukry, Gerapetritis said that the humanitarian situation in Gaza and the "high number of casualties requires immediate action."

On 15 February, Gerapetritis met with Riyad al-Maliki in Athens where he called for an "immediate and lasting cessation of hostilities" in Gaza. During the joint press conference, Gerapetritis said that Greece's position had remained constant throughout the crisis and added that Greece would support "every initiative" that promoted a "just and sustainable solution."

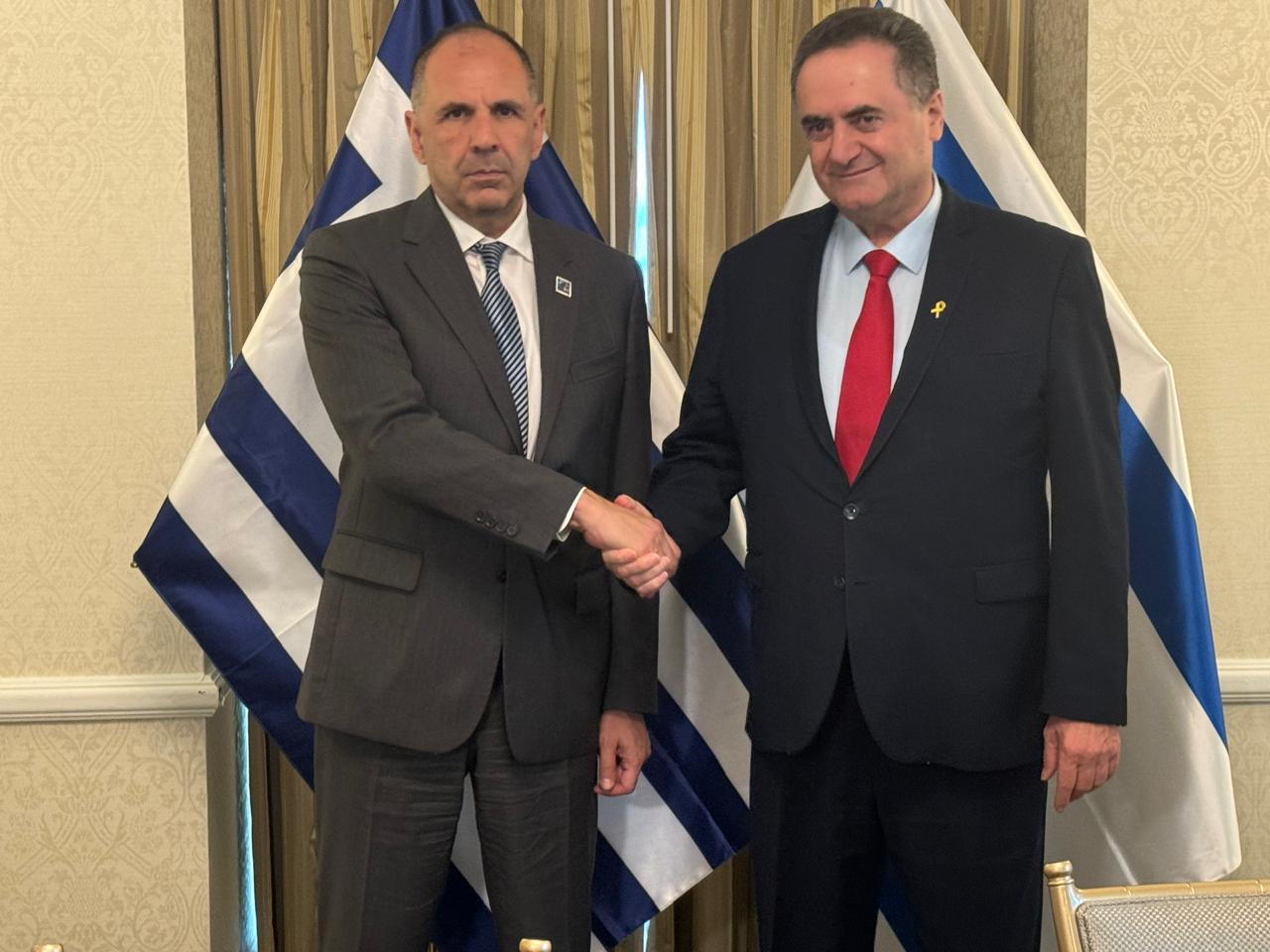
Gerapetritis with Israeli Foreign Minister Israel Katz on 11 July.

In May 2024, Gerapetritis said that there had been "disproportionate intervention in Gaza" and said the reality of the conflict "exceeded even the most negative expectations." In his statements with Foreign Minister Joly on 17 May, Gerapetritis said it was necessary to "immediately put an end to the bloodshed" and also to allow humanitarian aid to flow "unimpeded" into Gaza. On 20 May, in statements with Foreign Minister Shoukry, Gerapetritis said "that further expansion of hostilities in Rafah will have dramatic consequences and must be avoided at all costs." On 27 May, ahead of the Foreign Affairs Council, he called for an "immediate halt of all hostilities" and advocated for a two-state solution which he said was a "common place" for all of them.

On 10 June, during his speech at the Gaza aid conference, Gerapetritis expressed his support for U.S. President Joe Biden's ceasefire plan. He described the situation in Gaza "dramatic" and then went on to say that the Greek government "fully adopts" Biden's plan for an "immediate ceasefire and the return of the hostages."

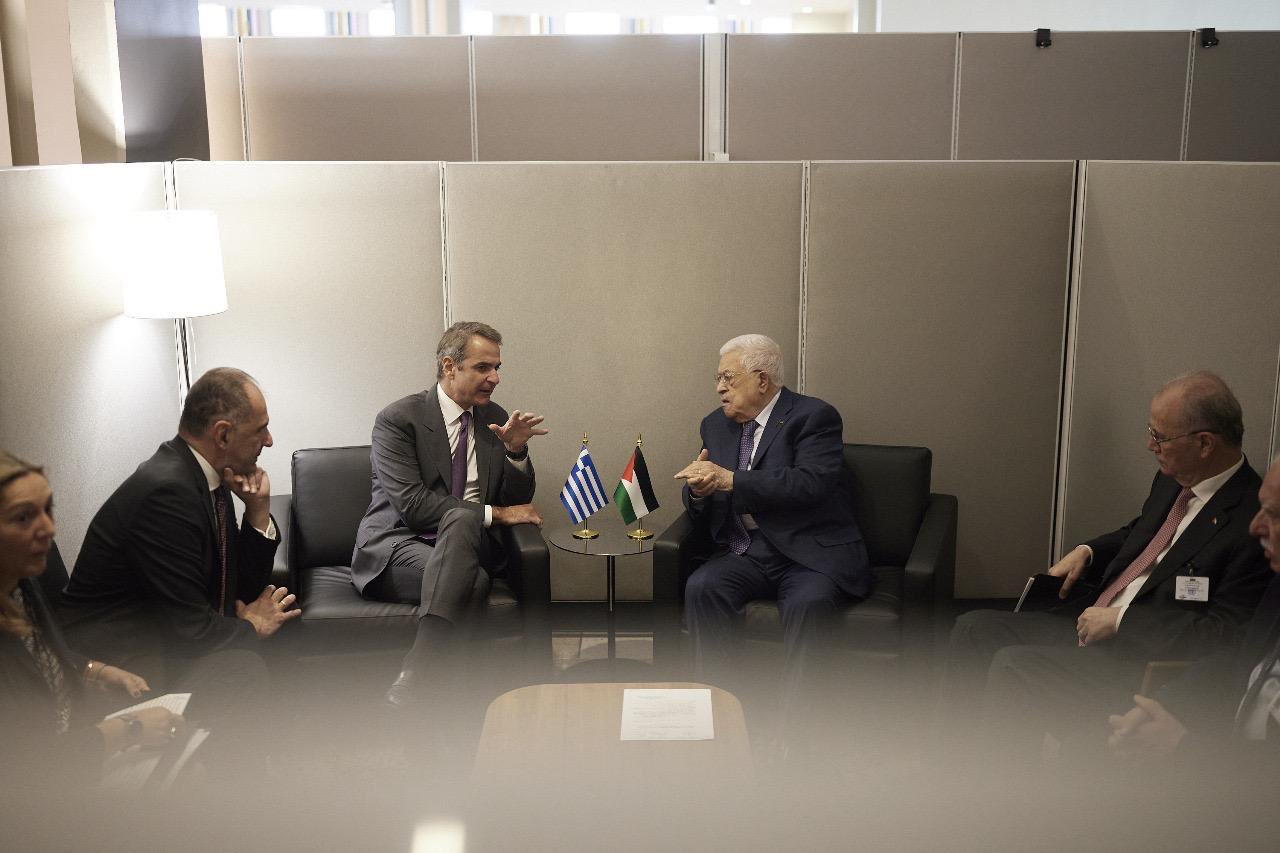
Gerapetritis (second from left) with Mitsotakis and Palestinian President Mahmoud Abbas on 26 September.

On 19 June, Gerapetritis said that Europe had a duty to host the children hurt and traumatised by the conflict in Gaza, for the time period that it continued. He also said that he was seeking partners in a project to temporarily bring children to the EU, and that he had discussed the idea with the Prime Minister of Palestine Mohammad Mustafa.

In September, Gerapetritis said that there was "no effective pressure" on Israel to end the war In Gaza, and also said that they were friends and strategic partners of Israel, but that they were trying to be open and sincere with them. He also said that at the moment there was a continuous, very strong reaction on the part of Israel. He also called for Arab and European countries to pursue joint initiatives to weigh on Israel, and said that recent escalations in Lebanon showed the failure of the international community. Gerapetritis added that the "more dispersed the war becomes, the more the situation becomes more complicated to solve", and asserted that Lebanon could easily be a "zone of tremendous hostility" and described it as a "minefield".

In October, he expressed solidarity with Israel and the Israeli people and condemned the rise of antisemitism across the world.

==== 2025 ====
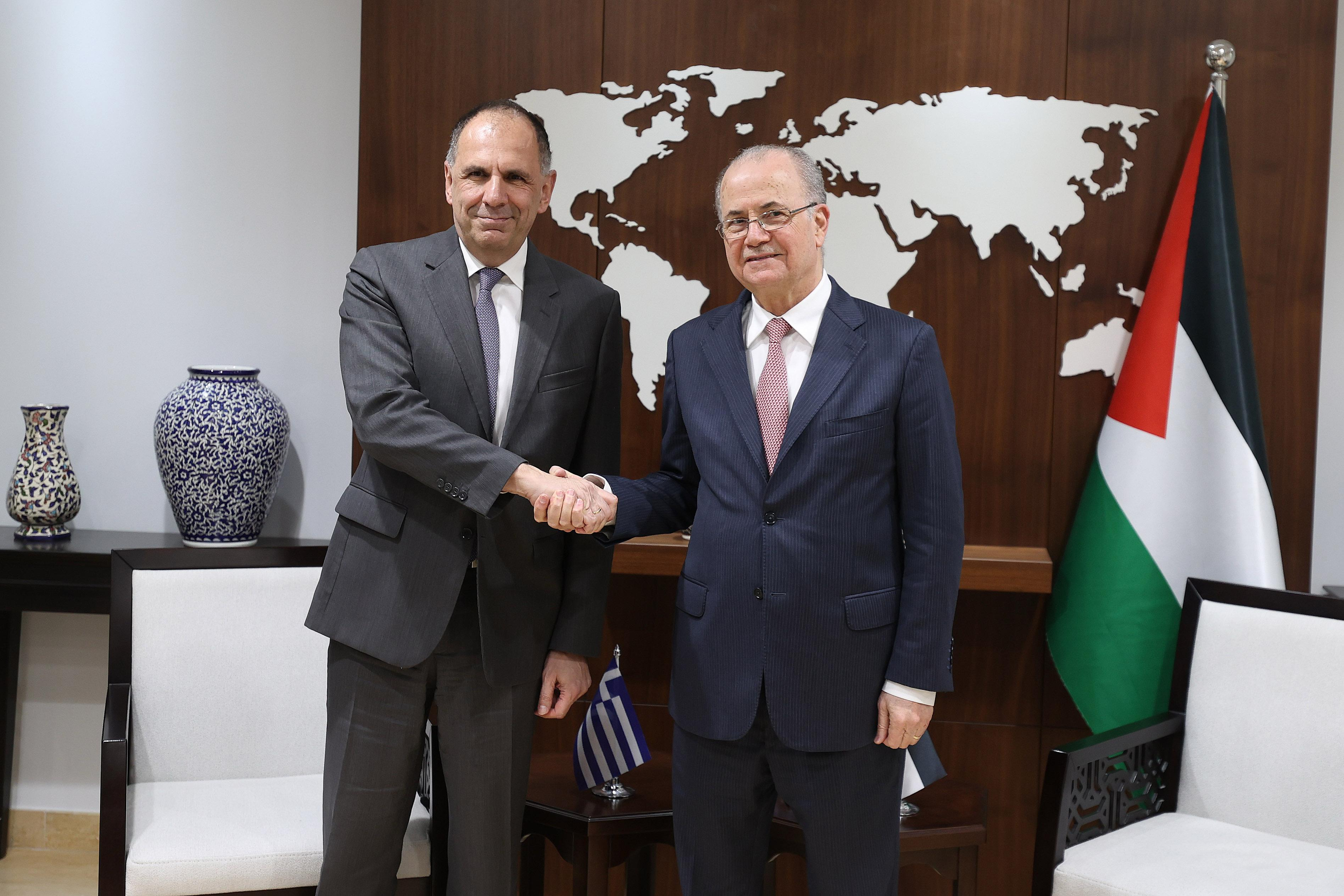
Gerapetritis with Prime Minister Mohammad Mustafa on 3 February.

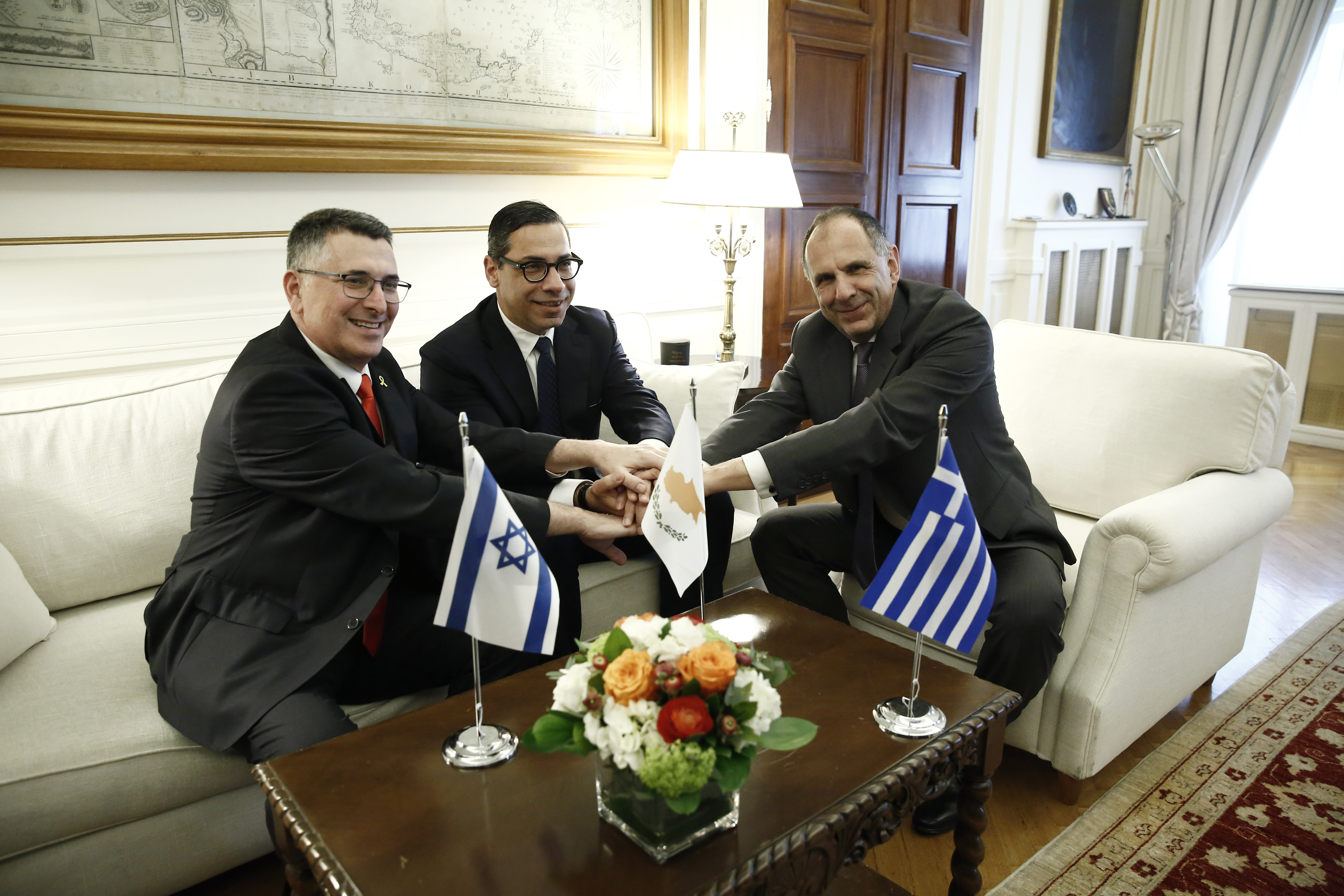
Gerapetritis with Israeli Foreign Minister Gideon Sa'ar on 13 March.

Between 2 and 4 February, Gerapetritis travelled to the Middle East where he met Israeli Foreign Minister Gideon Sa'ar on his visit to Jerusalem. During his meeting, Gerapetritis welcomed the 2025 Gaza war ceasefire and the hostage release agreement, and he also stressed the importance of all hostages returning home. Gerapetritis and Sa'ar also discussed regional developments and also enhancing strategic cooperation between Greece and Israel. On 3 February, Gerapetritis met with the Prime Minister of Palestine, Mohammad Mustafa, where he said that the unhindered flow of humanitarian aid to Gaza and the restoration of critical infrastructure was essential. Gerapetritis also met with Patriarch Theophilos III of Jerusalem with whom he discussed church issues.

At a UN security council meeting on 25 February, Gerapetritis said that the displacement of Palestinians could lead to regional instability, and called for Palestine to take a leading role on the issue. He also stressed the importance of completely implementing all stages of the ceasefire agreement to ensure the release of all hostages and the permanent cessation of hostilities, and also praised Egypt, Qatar and the United States on their role in mediating the agreement.

=== Turkey and Cyprus problem ===
On his visit to Cyprus on 4 July 2023 where he met with his counterpart Constantinos Kombos, Gerapetritis said that Greece would not accept "faits accomplis in any way" regarding the Cyprus issue and said that Greece "consistently supports Cyprus" in efforts to resolve the Cyprus dispute between the Greek Cypriot and Turkish Cypriot communities on the island of Cyprus, where troops of the Republic of Turkey have been stationed in the internationally unrecognized Turkish Republic of Northern Cyprus since the Turkish invasion of Cyprus in 1974. Gerapetritis said that the "challenges are significant" but that the Cyprus problem must be resolved in a way "we all desire." He also said that Greece was ready to start talks with Turkey to resolve the maritime border disputes between the two countries, saying that the Greek government wanted to "take advantage of the ongoing positive climate" and also adding that "all that remains is to determine whether Turkey also sincerely wishes to forge a path of rapprochement."

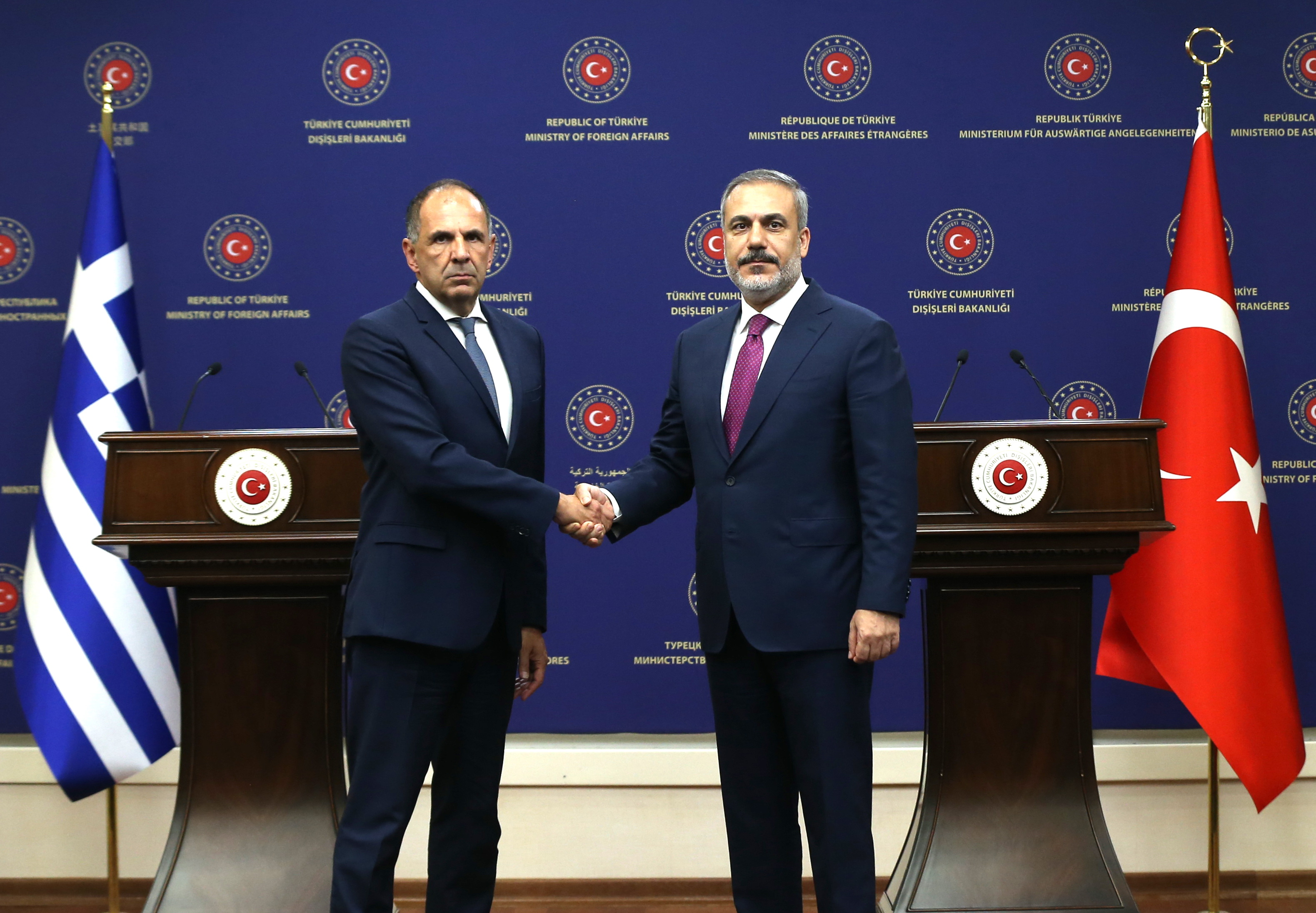
Gerapetritis with Hakan Fidan in Ankara on 5 September 2023

In August, Gerapetritis said that Greece was in the process of getting a "more sincere and frank" relationship with Turkey. It was confirmed later that month that Gerapetritis would visit Turkey to meet with his counterpart Turkish counterpart, Hakan Fidan, as relations improved between the two countries. On 5 September, Gerapetritis met with Fidan in Ankara and after their talks Fidan said that Turkey had entered a "new and positive period in our relations with Greece." After their meeting, Gerapetritis said that as foreign ministers in picking up the "threads of Greek-Turkish relations" and promoting "mutual cooperation," they were entrusted with undertaking the political guidance of the process. He then went on to say that their mission was firstly to "address the major issues that arise" between the two countries, secondly to "guide discussions between the two countries at all levels" and thirdly to "prepare the meetings" of their two leaders. He then said that he and Fidan had agreed the "roadmap" for the next period would have three levels; "political dialogue", "the implementation and strengthening of the Confidence Building Measures" and "to promote the positive agenda of cooperation" under Deputy Minister Kostas Fragogiannis. Gerapetritis also said that Greece's position on the Cyprus issue was "well known" and that the "immediate resumption of talks" was a "crucial and necessary step."

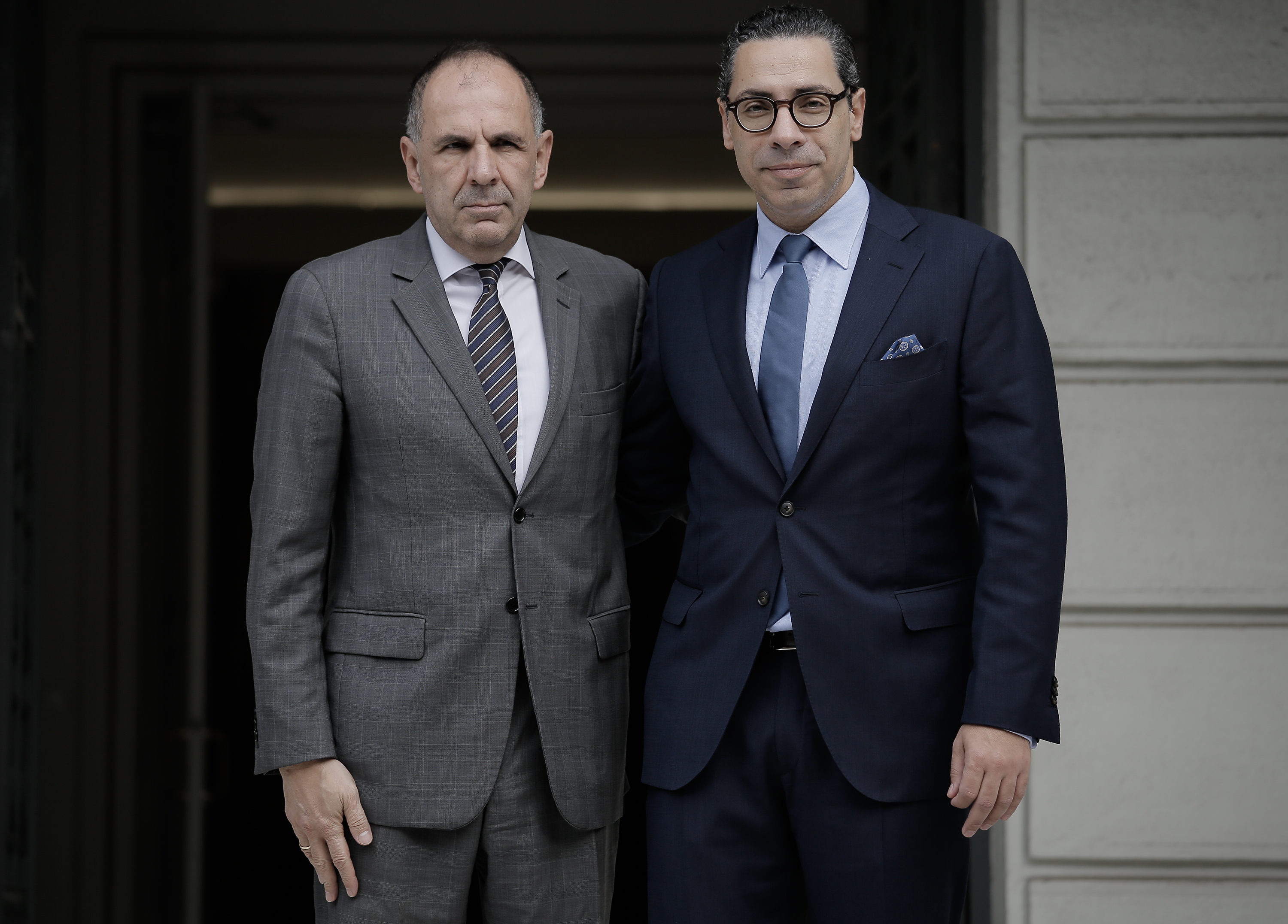
Gerapetritis with Cyprus Foreign Minister Constantinos Kombos on 10 November 2023

On 19 September, in response to President Recep Tayyip Erdoğan's call for international recognition of the Turkish Republic of Northern Cyprus, Gerapetritis said that plans for a two-state solution were "out of the agenda" and said that Greece was "totally aligned with the Cypriot government in promoting the idea of a unified Cyprus."

On 10 November, Gerapetritis met with Foreign Minister Kombos in Athens, in the context of the High Level Cooperation Council between Greece and Cyprus.

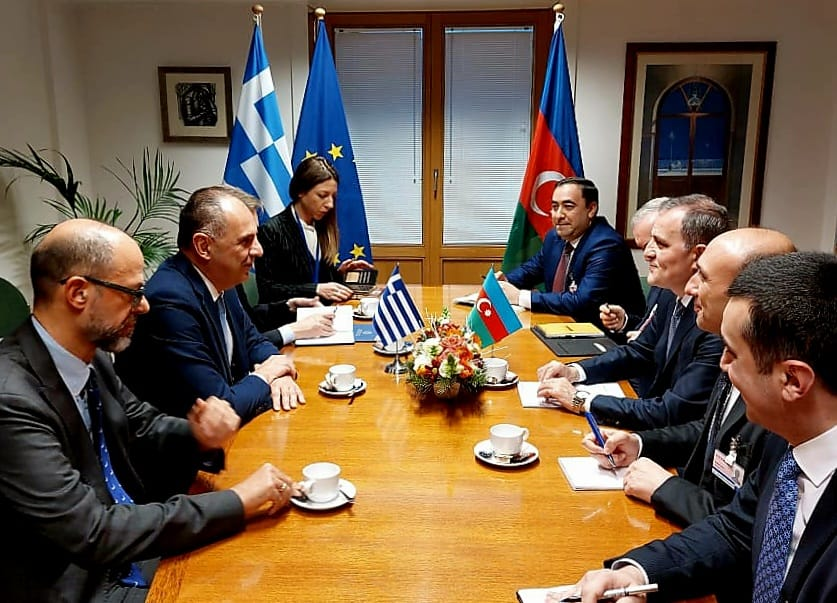
Gerapetritis with Azerbaijani Foreign Minister Jeyhun Bayramov in Brussels on 11 February 2023

On 7 December, Gerapetritis welcomed Erdoğan at Athens International Airport on his visit to Greece, and said it was a "historical day" and that it marked a "genuine willingness" to "move forward" in the relationship between Greece and Turkey. On 9 November, Gerapetritis had a telephone call with Foreign Minister Kombos where he briefed him on the results of the meeting Greece-Turkey High Council of Cooperation that took place on Erdoğan's visit.

On 2 February 2024, whilst attending an informal meeting of EU Foreign Ministers in Brussels, Gerapetritis said that Greece had always been "in favour of Turkey's European course" and added that the relations between the two countries had "recently improved," as well as discussing the Cyprus issue where he said on Turkey that there must be "tangible evidence" that there was a "willingness to continue the dialogue on the Cyprus issue." On 2 April, Gerapetritis met with Foreign Minister Fidan on the sidelines of the NATO Foreign Ministers meeting, and they discussed the roadmap of their bilateral cooperation. On 27 April, he again met with Fidan and they discussed regional and international issues.

=== Russia-Ukraine war ===
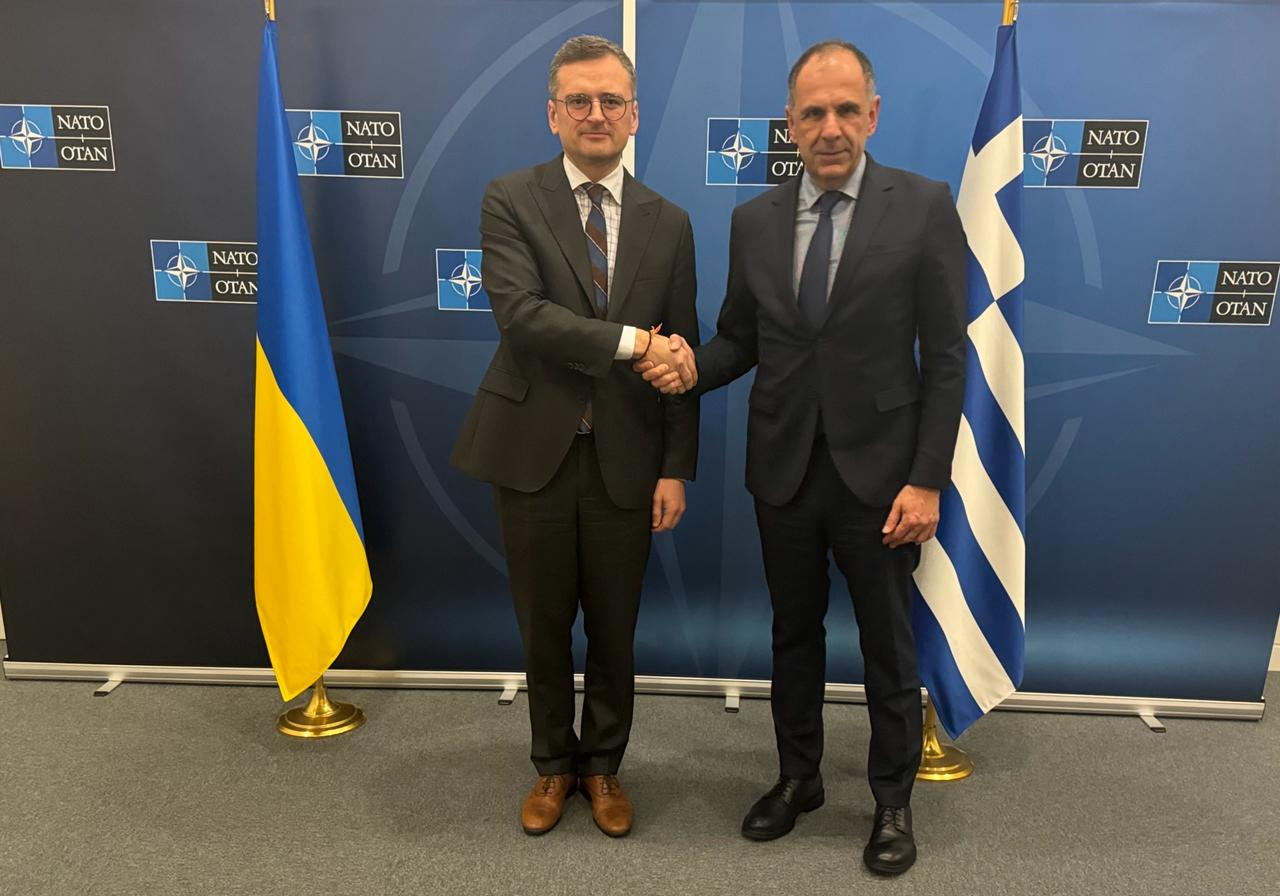
Gerapetritis with Dmytro Kuleba on 3 April 2024

On 11 August 2023, Gerapetritis had a telephone call with Ukrainian Foreign Minister Dmytro Kuleba, where he stated that Greece would support all international initiatives aimed at restoring Ukraine's sovereignty and preventing humanitarian crises, as well as confirming their commitment to expanding bilateral cooperation.

On 21 September 2023, in his address to the UN Security Council in New York, Gerapetritis said that the Russian invasion of Ukraine remained "a serious threat to European security, as well as to global peace and stability." He went on to say that Ukrainians "fight for their right to live in a democratic society" and that Greece and the EU would stand by them as they did so. On 2 October, Gerapetritis attended a meeting of EU Foreign Ministers in Kyiv where he said there would be "immense repercussions" and huge "consequences" if there was a collapse of an agreement with Russia for the safe export of Ukrainian grain through the black sea; adding that Greece was ready to help in providing ports like Alexandroupoli to facilitate the shipments.

In his opening remarks at the International Conference on the Reconstruction of Ukraine held in Athens on 15 February 2024, Gerapetritis said that the Russian invasion "flagrantly violates the Charter of the United Nations and the established International Law" and that Greece "staunchly supports" the independence of Ukraine within its recognised sovereign borders.

On 3 April 2024, Gerapetritis met with Foreign Minister Kuleba on the sidelines of the NATO summit of Foreign Ministers and discussed ways to advance bilateral cooperation.

=== South America ===
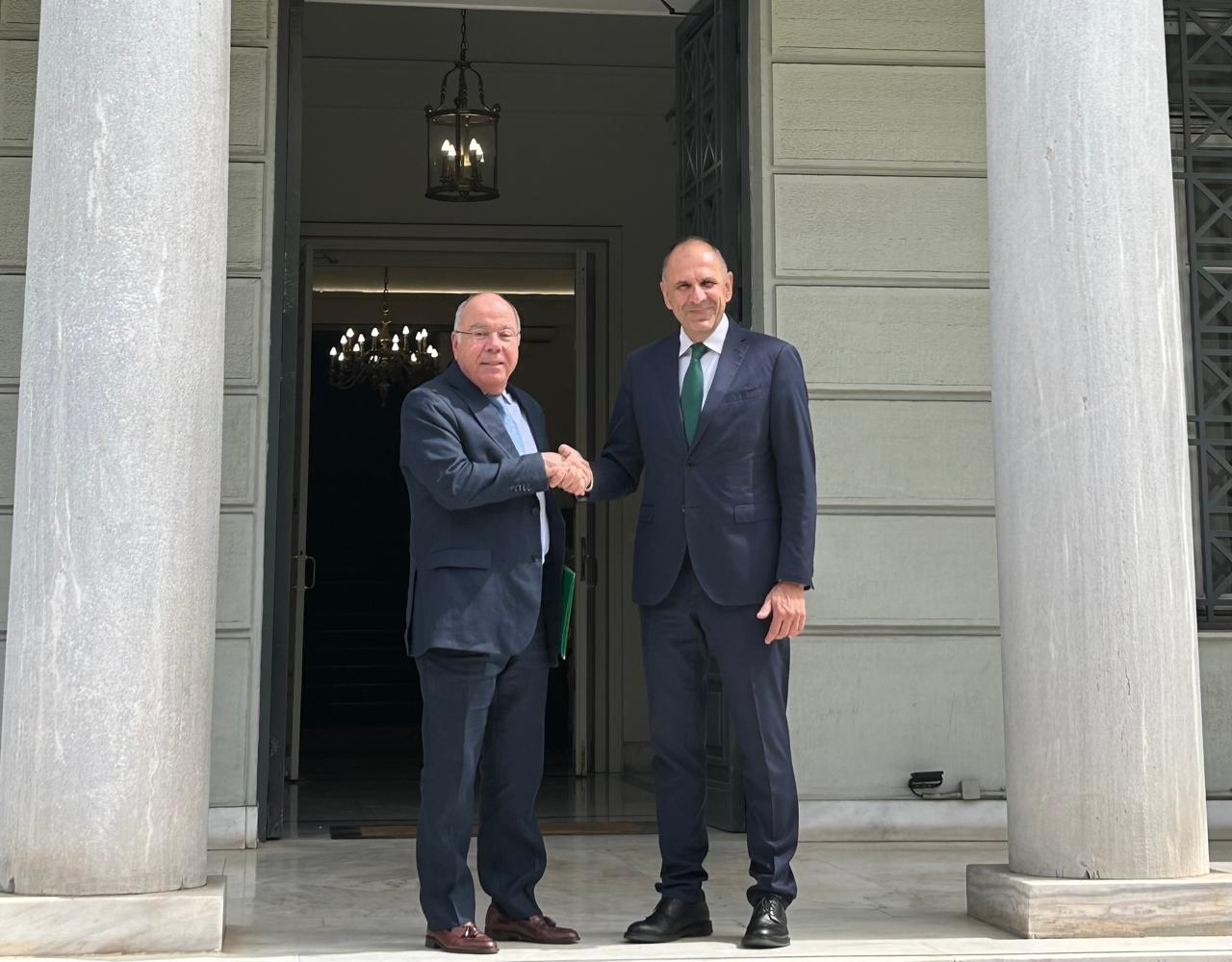
Gerapetritis with Mauro Vieira on 13 June 2024.

In July 2023, Gerapetritis attended the 3rd EU–CELAC summit where he met with the Peruvian Minister of Foreign Affairs, Ana Gervasi, where they discussed the strengthening of common stances on global scope matters.

On 25 August 2023, Gerapetritis met the Minister of Foreign Affairs of Chile, Alberto van Klaveren, in Athens. Following their meeting, Gerapetritis said that they both believe in the "peaceful resolution of interstate disputes on the basis of International Law" and also stated that during their meeting they had the opportunity to address areas of mutual interest including the economy, green growth, investment, energy and shipping.

On 13 June 2024, Gerapetritis met with the Brazilian Minister of Foreign Affairs, Mauro Vieira, in Athens. Gerapetritis said that Athens recognises Brazil's "increasingly significant global role" and that during their meeting they discussed various regional and international issues regarding global governance.

=== Oceania ===
On 2 February 2024, Gerapetritis met with Deputy Prime Minister and Foreign Minister of Vanatalu, Matai Seremaiah Nawalu, on the sidelines of the third EU Indo-Pacific Ministerial Forum in Brussels. The talks they held focused on maritime security in the Red Sea, climate change and also the United Nations Convention on the Law of the Sea.

=== Africa ===
==== Egypt ====
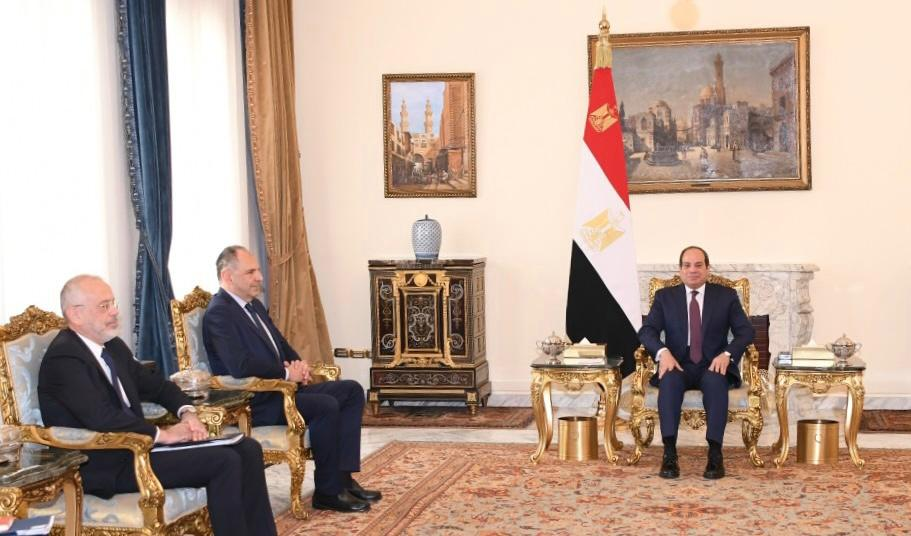
Gerapetritis with President Abdel Fattah El-Sisi on 17 January 2024.

On 3 August 2023, Gerapetritis was part of a delegation which accompanied Prime Minister Mitsotakis on a visit to Egypt which held talks with Egyptian President Abdel Fattah El-Sisi. Gerapetritis said that the President and Prime Minister had discussed bilateral relations and in part the electricity interconnection project amongst other issues including civil protection and collaboration on a multilateral level. Gerapetritis also said that they visited and paid tribute to the Memorial for Greeks fallen at the Battle of El-Alamein, as well as meeting with Pope Tawadros II of Alexandria. The Egyptian counterpart of Gerapetritis, Foreign Minister Sameh Shoukry, invited him to extend hid visit by a day to continue discussions on 4 August as a follow-up to the meetings held the previous day. In his talks with Shoukry, Gerapetritis said that talks expanded to regional issues in Africa, the Middle East and the Eastern Mediterranean. He described it as an "exceptionally productive meeting" and also said that there was a "convergence of views on nearly all issues."

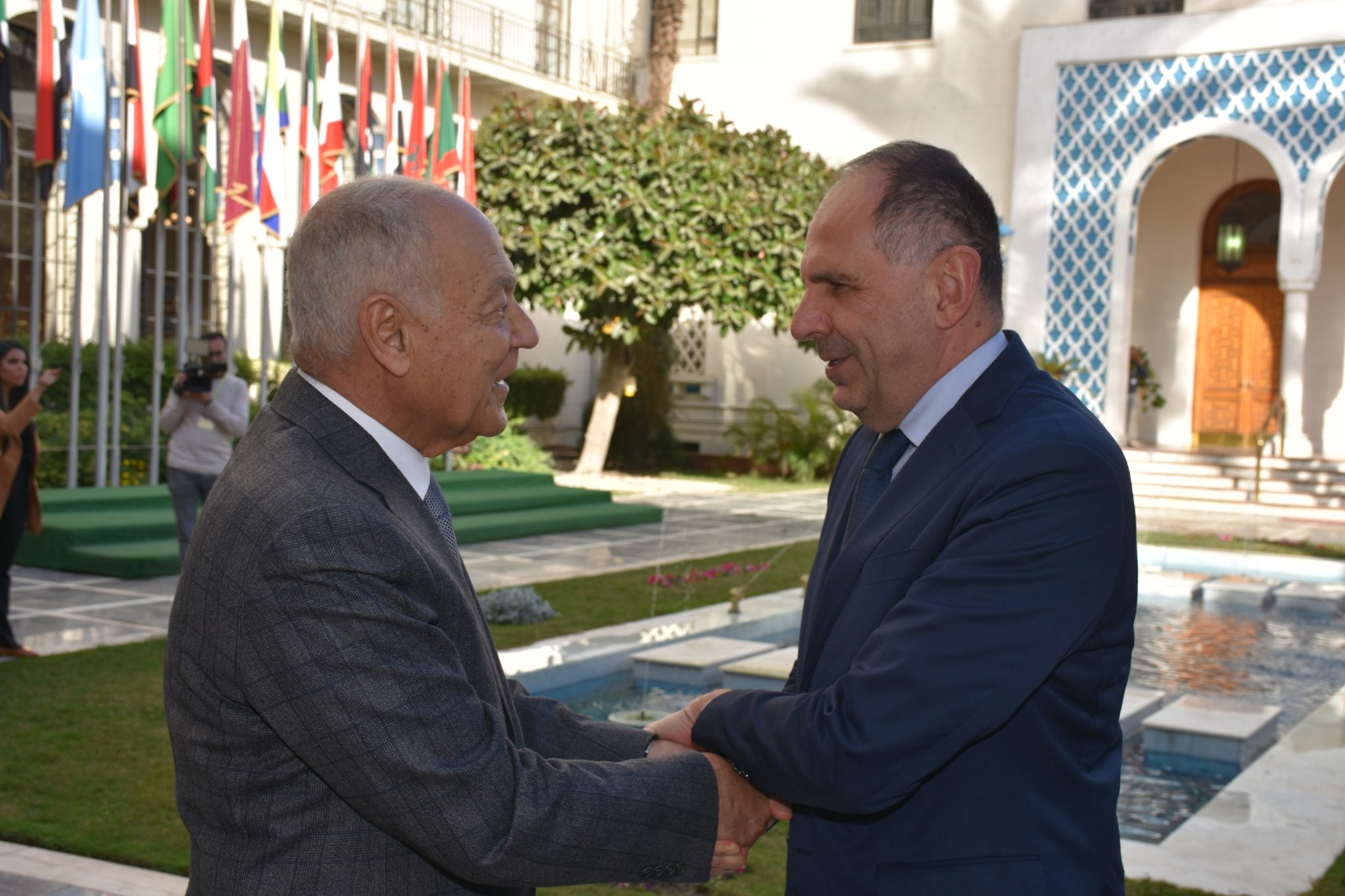
Gerapetritis with Ahmed Aboul Gheit on 17 January 2024

On 17 January 2024, Gerapetritis travelled to Cairo where he was received by Egyptian President El-Sisi and their talks focused on matters regarding bilateral and regional interest, as well as the conflict in the Middle East. Foreign Minister Shoukry was also in attendance at the meeting, and the road map to strengthening bilateral relations between the two countries was also discussed. He subsequently met Shoukry for the third time as Foreign Minister in a working lunch, and in their statements Gerapetritis said that the strengthening of bilateral relarions was again discussed including the electricity interconnector between the two countries. Additionally, Gerapetritis said that Greece and Egypt's "shared vision for regional peace, growth, and prosperity, should serve as an example for other nations."" He also met with the Secretary-General of the Arab League, Ahmed Aboul Gheit, in Cairo.

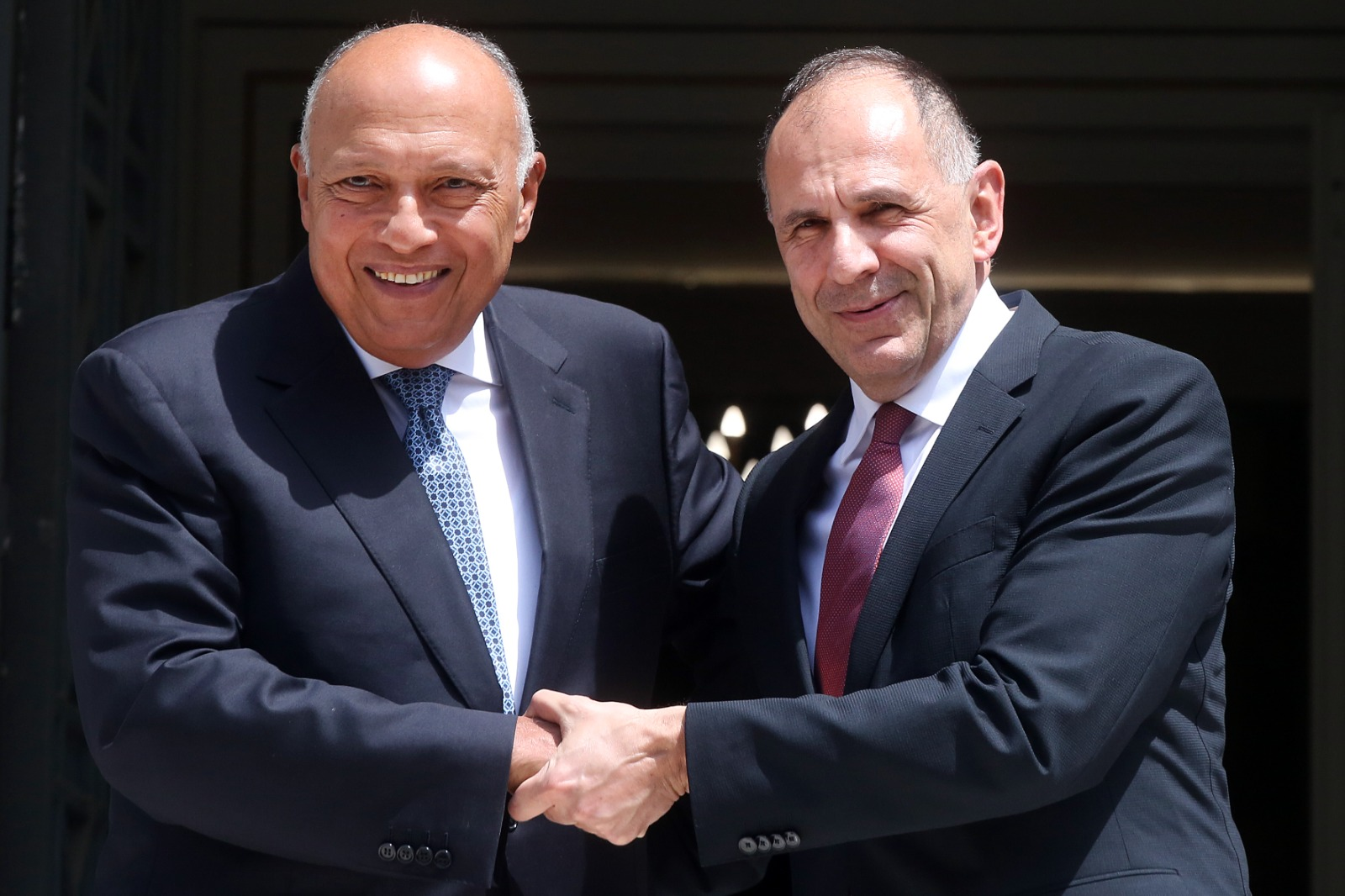
Gerapetritis with Sameh Shoukry on 20 May 2024.

On 20 May, Gerapetritis met with Foreign Minister Shoukry in Athens. In their meeting, they discussed bilateral ties and in their subsequent statements Gerapetritis expressed his condolences at the death of Iranian President Ebrahim Raisi. He also stated that they discussed migration, with Gerapetritis stating that they "examined ways to address and limit illegal migration" whilst also assessing "the situation regarding legal migration routes." Furthermore, Gerapetritis said that they "promoted the signing of the EU-Egypt Strategic and Comprehensive Partnership" which he described as "absolutely crucial for both Europe and Egypt." Gerapetritis also said that the strategic relationship between Cairo and Athens was "not only necessary but also exemplary" and cited the 2020 Agreement on the delimitation of the Exclusive Economic Zone between the two countries as an example of "good neighbourly relations."

==== Ghana ====
On 15 April 2024, Gerapetritis met with the Foreign Minister of Ghana, Shirley Ayorkor Botchwey, and he emphasised the importance of Ghana as an ally to the EU and to Greece, as well as identifying the potential for growth in various sectors, including cultural, economic, trade and energy ties.

=== Asia ===
==== India ====
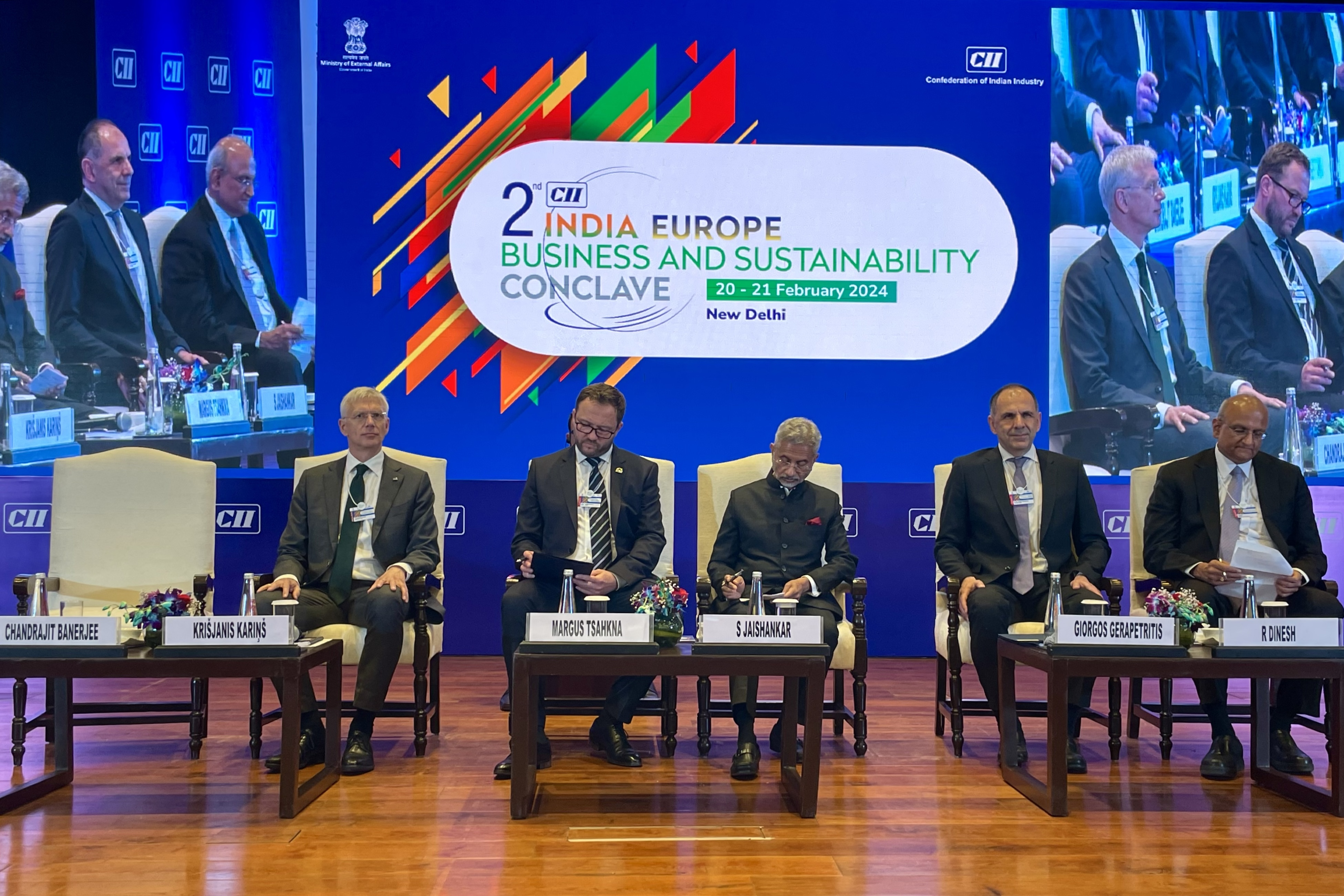
(From left to right) Krišjānis Kariņš, Margus Tsahkna, S. Jaishankar, Gerapetritis and R. Dinesh at the India Europe Business & Sustainability Conclave on 20 February 2024.

On 25 August 2023, Gerapetritis received Prime Minister of India Narendra Modi at Athens International Airport, which was the first visit of an Indian Prime Minister to Greece in 40 years.

On 20 February 2024, Gerapetritis travelled to New Delhi in India to meet with the Indian Minister of External Affairs, S. Jaishankar, ahead of Prime Minister Mitsotakis travelling to India on 21 February. During his meeting with Jaishankar, Gerapetritis underlined the opportunities for the two countries in facing the challenges they both face. The same day, he also addressed the 2nd Conference of the Confederation of Indian Industry (CII) titled "India Europe Business & Sustainability Conclave" and said that he hoped Greece could be a gateway between India and the European Union which he stated would "enhance the strategic importance of the regions involved." On 21 February, he accompanied Prime Minister Mitsotakis in a meeting with Prime Minister Narendra Modi and Jaishankar. On 22 February, he was the keynote speaker at the 2024 Raisina Dialogue which was titled "From the Indo-Pacific to the Med-Atlantic: Geometries of Growth."

==== Syria ====
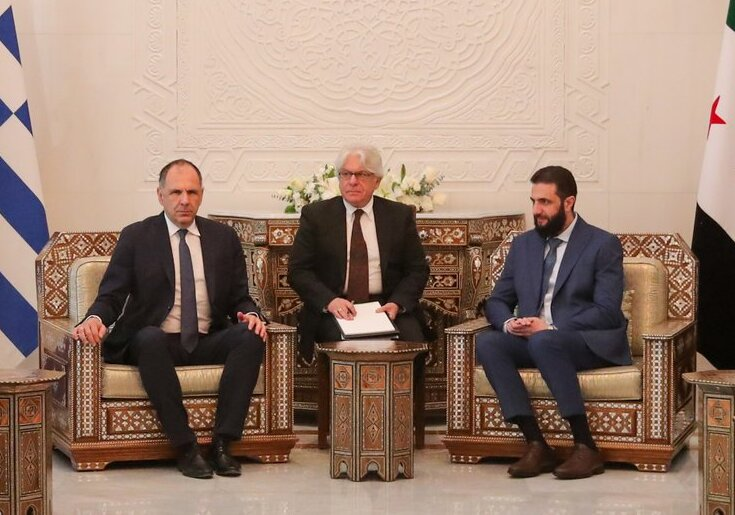
Gerapetritis with Syrian President Ahmed al-Sharaa in Damascus, Syria on 9 February 2025

On 9 February 2025, Gerapetritis led a Greek delegation and met with Syrian President Ahmed al-Sharaa. During the meeting, Gerapetritis stated, "We discussed Syria’s new institutions following the fall of the Assad regime."

== Personal life ==
Gerapetritis is married to lawyer Alexandra Gourzi, and they have two children, Emelia and Aliki.

Gerapetritis has published 8 books and over 100 articles in 3 different languages. He is fluent in English and French, and can speak good Italian and basic German, in addition to his native Greek.

== See also ==
- List of current foreign ministers
- List of foreign ministers in 2023
