= Next Greek parliamentary election =

Future parliamentary election in Greece

- By 25 July 2027
- 300 seats in the Hellenic Parliament; 151 seats needed for a majority
- Opinion polls
Party	Leader	Current seats
ND	Kyriakos Mitsotakis	156
PASOK–KINAL	Nikos Androulakis	36
KKE	Dimitris Koutsoumpas	21
Syriza	Rena Dourou (interim) (Note: The Presidency of Syriza has remained vacant since 9 July 2026. Based on the statute of the party, the President must be elected by 'the base' of the party, and during an interim period, the capacity is filled by the Party Secretariat. However, the President of the Parliamentary Group, Rena Dourou is considered for practical purposes to be the de facto interim leader of the party.)	11
EL	Kyriakos Velopoulos	11
NIKI	Dimitris Natsios	8
PE	Zoe Konstantopoulou	5
NA	Gabriel Sakellaridis (interim) (Note: In acting capacity, as Secretary of the Central Committee.)	4
Alliance of Greeks	Giannis Dimitrokallis (Note: The party has been endorsed by Ilias Kasidiaris, and he is considered to be the genuine leader of it, even though he is forbidden from running in elections.)	3
PARON	Michalis Gavgiotakis	2
Spartans	Vasilis Stigkas	2
DPK	Stefanos Kasselakis	1
Hellenic Pulse	Nikos Papadopoulos	1
Independents	–	36
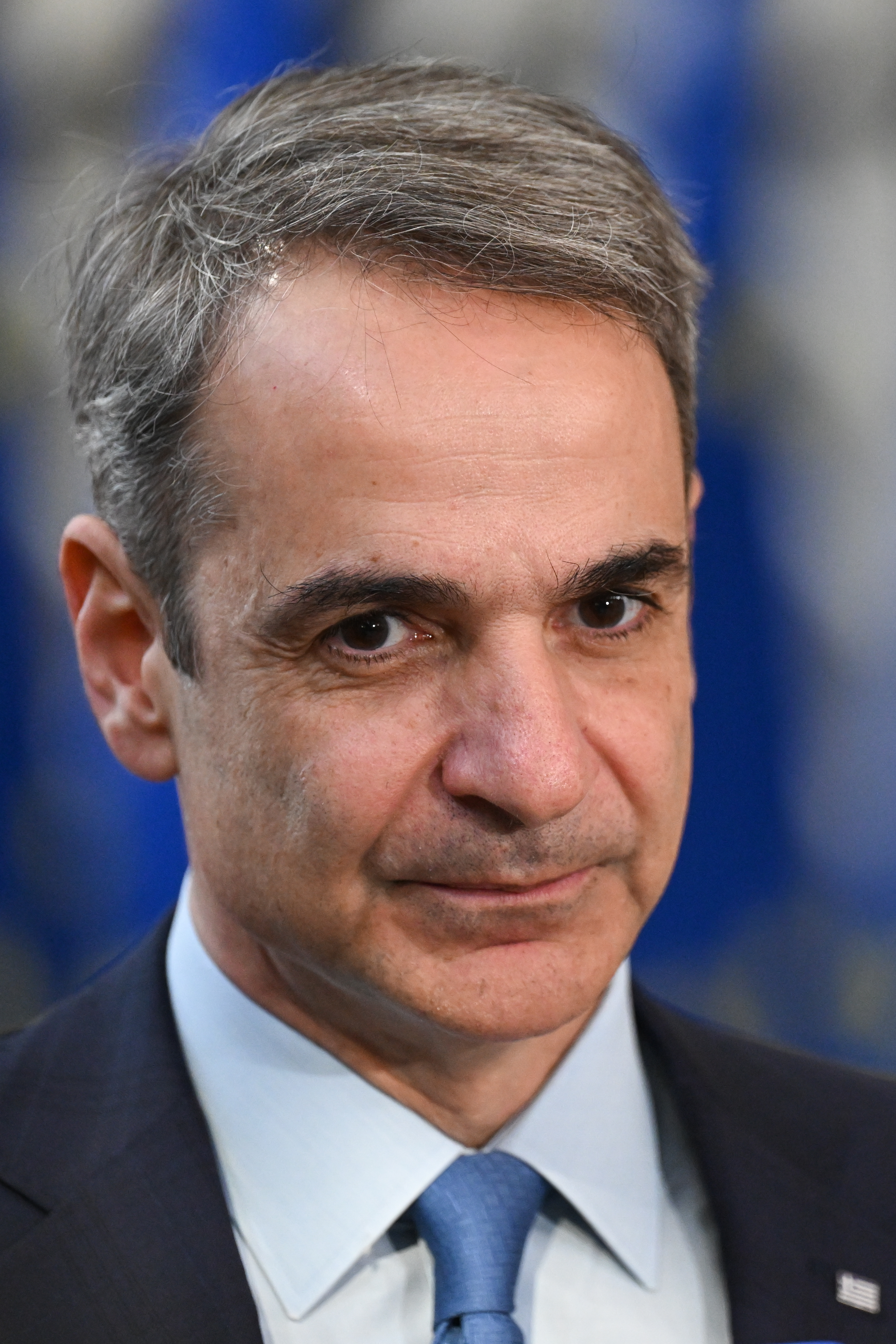
Incumbent Prime Minister
Kyriakos Mitsotakis; ND

Parliamentary elections are to be held by 25 July 2027, to elect the 300 members of the Hellenic Parliament. However, as Prime Minister Kyriakos Mitsotakis reserves the right to request the dissolution of Parliament from the President for "extraordinary reasons of national importance", he has stated his intention to call for elections in the spring of 2027.

== Background ==
In the June 2023 parliamentary election, Kyriakos Mitsotakis was elected to the office of Prime Minister of Greece once again, replacing caretaker Prime Minister Ioannis Sarmas. His party, New Democracy, obtained an absolute majority in Parliament with 158 MPs. Coming second and representing the official parliamentary opposition was Syriza, which had its seats nearly halved from the 2019 Greek parliamentary election, from 86 down to 47 in June 2023. Minor parties Spartans, Victory (Niki), and Course of Freedom entered Parliament for the first time, while previously elected parties (PASOK – KINAL, KKE, and Greek Solution) increased their seats and voting percentages compared to 2019.

=== Syriza leadership elections and splits ===
Syriza president Alexis Tsipras announced his resignation four days after the election, calling for leadership elections. The race went into a second round between former Labour Minister Effie Achtsioglou and party outsider Stefanos Kasselakis. Kasselakis went on to defeat Achtsioglou on a 12-point margin and was elected President of Syriza.

With his election and his rhetoric of moving Syriza towards the political centre, Kasselakis caused internal party turmoil, leading to the first major split from Syriza since the last one in 2015 (Popular Unity) and the creation of New Left two months into his leadership.

After Syriza's mediocre performance at the European Parliament elections, as well as rapid and unpopular internal changes to the party, Kasselakis was ousted from the presidency by a vote of no-confidence in the Central Committee on 7 September and fresh elections were called. He was later barred from running by the Central Committee, and left the party during its extraordinary Congress, later founding his own party, Movement for Democracy. On 24 November, Sokratis Famellos was ultimately elected as president.

=== 2023 local elections ===
On 8 and 15 October 2023, local elections were held. New Democracy-aligned lists lost in five regions they had been elected in 2019, as well as the two largest municipalities, Athens and Thessaloniki. In Athens, PASOK-backed Haris Doukas was elected mayor on the second round, defeating incumbent New Democracy-backed Kostas Bakoyiannis, after getting endorsed by Kostas Zachariadis, the third-placed candidate backed by Syriza. In Thessaloniki, Stelios Angeloudis defeated the New Democracy-backed incumbent Konstantinos Zervas on a landslide of 34 points.

=== Tempi train crash case, protests, and movement ===
The Tempi train crash case has become a major scandal in Greek politics, with major political developments, protests,and a general movement for justice for the victims of the crash and their relatives springing up during the latter weeks of the First and throughout the Second governments of Kyriakos Mitsotakis.

=== 2024 European Parliament election ===
In June 2024, European Parliament elections took place. New Democracy topped the poll but with a lower percentage than both the parliamentary, and the previous European ones, with 28% of the votes and electing seven members of the European Parliament (MEPs). Although opinion polls just two months prior indicated PASOK – KINAL coming in second place, Syriza recovered into the second spot but with two fewer MEPs for a total of four, while PASOK – KINAL remained in third place but elected one more MEP for a total of three. Greek Solution and KKE came close in percentages but ultimately Greek Solution slightly surpassed KKE, with both electing two MEPs, each at around 9% of the vote. Niki and Course of Freedom each elected an MEP, and Voice of Reason crossed the 3% electoral threshold for the first time, electing its leader Afroditi Latinopoulou as an MEP.

=== PASOK—KINAL leadership race ===
Immediately following the European Parliament election, PASOK – KINAL high-ranking members questioned Nikos Androulakis' leadership one after the other, in response to the election results that were perceived as mediocre, coercing him into calling for early leadership elections in October of the same year, bypassing the planned ones for late 2025. Newly elected mayor of Athens, Haris Doukas, as well as MP Pavlos Geroulanos, announced their candidacies on that same Central Committee meeting. Other candidates included Anna Diamantopoulou, Michalis Katrinis, and Nadia Giannakopoulou. After a close race for the second spot with Geroulanos, Doukas made it to the runoff along with Androulakis; however, he went on to lose on a 20-point margin against him. Nikos Androulakis was re-elected to the Presidency of PASOK – KINAL, and became the Leader of the Official Opposition in late November 2024, with enough Syriza MPs leaving the party for it to drop in seat count behind PASOK – KINAL.

=== 2025 presidential election ===
By late 2024, as the purported date of the election of the President of the Hellenic Republic approached, parties began announcing their candidates for the post. Prime Minister Kyriakos Mitsotakis proposed Kostas Tasoulas, who won out in the end after four rounds of voting, with 160 votes out of 300, on 12 February 2025.

The Mitsotakis government has been criticized by the opposition for nominating a candidate without general consensus among the larger parties, unlike that of the previous election.

=== Farming subsidies scandal (OPEKEPE) ===
==== Initial phase ====
In May 2025, the "OPEKEPE scandal" broke out. The "Payment and Control Agency for Guidance and Guarantee Community Aid" (Greek: ΟΠΕΚΕΠΕ) came under scrutiny by the public eye, over the abuse of farming subsidies, from illegal, false declarations of farmland, and general covering-up of the entire scheme. Initiated by whistleblowers and an intervention by the European Public Prosecutor's Office, the scandal has forced resignations of government ministers, and political turmoil.

Noteworthy moments of the scandal include the transfer of the case’s file to the Hellenic Parliament, the resignations of government ministers Makis Voridis, Tasos Chatzivasileiou, Christos Boukoros, and Dionysis Stamenitis, the decision on disestablishing the agency itself and the transfer of its workload and authority to AADE, the €400M fine imposed onto the Greek state by the European Commission, and the funding cuts that it provided for, the controversial —deemed invalid by the opposition and unconstitutional by Constitutional lawyer and former Deputy Prime Minister Evangelos Venizelos— failed votes on establishing ad hoc parliamentary committees investigating ministers for criminal conduct, and instead, the establishment of an inquiry investigating the agency from its inception (1998), the visit of the European Chief Prosecutor, Laura Kövesi, to Athens, in which she called for the abolishment of Article 86 of the Greek Constitution ("Law on Ministerial responsibility").

==== Later developments (Parliamentary inquiry, Protests) ====
As part of the investigation and the political scandal, after the summer of 2025, the ad hoc Parliamentary inquiry began its process of holding hearings, that were concluded in February 2026. The scandal’s publicization was followed, a couple of months later, in late November 2025, by farmers’ protests and road blockades on major highways.

=== Formation of Elpida and ELAS ===
Maria Karystianou is a Greek paediatrician and activist who lost her daughter in the 2023 Tempi train crash. She subsequently became a founding member and president of the "Tempi 2023 Victims' Association" and emerged as the leading figure of the movement seeking accountability for the railway disaster. In January 2026, she announced the formation of an anti-corruption political movement with the aim of "participating in the electoral process". This decision sparked reactions within the "Tempi 2023 Victims' Association", with the majority of the association demanding her resignation. On January 13, 2026, she resigned as president of the association, and on May 21 launched her party, "Hope for Democracy".

After the June 2023 elections, Alexis Tsipras, then president of Syriza and Leader of the Official Opposition, announced an internal party election to select new leadership. He also announced his resignation as party president and that he would not be a candidate in the election. In March 2024, he was elected Chair of the Council of Europe’s Sub-Committee on the Western Balkans, a position he held until January 2026.

On October 6, 2025, Alexis Tsipras resigned as a member of parliament. He later published an autobiography titled Ithaca. For several months, there was speculation that Tsipras would form his own party. Ultimately, on May 26, 2026, Tsipras formally launched the Greek Left Alliance (ELAS). Since its formation, the party has consistently ranked second in opinion polls.

The formation of ELAS caused turmoil within Syriza, with several MPs and party officials departing. However, despite the defections, Syriza's Central Committee has confirmed that the party would contest in the upcoming national elections and began preparations for its electoral lists.

== Electoral system ==
Compulsory voting is in force for the elections, with voter registration being automatic; however, none of the legally existing penalties or sanctions have ever been enforced.

In January 2020, soon after returning to power, New Democracy, which has always been a proponent of majority bonuses since 1974, passed a new electoral law to reinstate them, albeit under a significantly different formula. The party list coming first would receive 20 extra seats,(down from 50, with the constituency seats up from 250 to 280) provided it received at least 25% of the vote. Moreover, a new sliding scale disproportionality would help the larger party lists: those receiving between 25% and 40% of the vote would receive one seat for every half percentage point in this range (up to 30 seats) before the proper proportional distribution begins. A winning party may thus receive up to 50 extra seats; however, this 2020 law also lacked the supermajority to take immediate effect. As a result, it took effect in the second election after the passage of the law, namely the June 2023 parliamentary election.

In the 2024 European Parliament election in Greece, citizens were allowed to vote by mail for the first time through a new process, where the possibility of voting from abroad through separate ballot boxes was abolished and the previous electoral rolls were wiped, and mail-in ballots were shipped upon registration to the new election rolls for mail-in voting.

The new electoral system, favoring parties over coalitions, led to the amalgamation of PASOK – Movement for Change into a unitary party on 29 March 2026.

== Political parties ==
=== Parliamentary groups ===
Party	Leader(s)	Ideology	2023 result	Current seats	Status
New Democracy	Kyriakos Mitsotakis	Liberal conservatism Christian democracy	158 / 300	156 / 300	Government
PASOK – KINAL	Nikos Androulakis	Social democracy	32 / 300	36 / 300	Opposition
KKE	Dimitris Koutsoumpas	Communism Marxism-Leninism	21 / 300	21 / 300	Opposition
Syriza	Rena Dourou	Social democracy Democratic Socialism	47 / 300	11 / 300	Opposition
Greek Solution	Kyriakos Velopoulos	Nationalism National conservatism	12 / 300	11 / 300	Opposition
Niki	Dimitris Natsios	Christian nationalism Social Conservatism	10 / 300	8 / 300	Opposition
Course of Freedom	Zoe Konstantopoulou	Populism Left-wing nationalism	8 / 300	5 / 300	Opposition
Independents				49 / 300	Opposition

=== Other active parties ===
Party/Alliance	Leader(s)	Ideology	2023 result	Current seats	Status
New Left	Gabriel Sakellaridis (interim)	Democratic socialism Progressivism	Part of Syriza	4 / 300	Opposition
Alliance of Greeks	Giannis Dimitrokallis	Ultranationalism Neo-fascism	Part of Spartans	3 / 300	Opposition
Spartans	Vasilis Stigkas	Ultranationalism Neo-fascism	12 / 300	2 / 300	Opposition
PARON	Michalis Gavgiotakis	Ultranationalism Neo-fascism	Part of Spartans	2 / 300	Opposition
Hellenic Pulse	Nikos Papadopoulos	Christian nationalism Social Conservatism	Part of Niki	1 / 300	Opposition
Democrats – Progressive Centre	Stefanos Kasselakis	Social Liberalism Progressivism	Part of Syriza	1 / 300	Opposition
MeRA25	Yanis Varoufakis	Anti-austerity Democratic Socialism	0 / 300	0 / 300	Extraparliamentary
Voice of Reason	Afroditi Latinopoulou	Right-wing populism Ultraconservatism	0 / 300	0 / 300	Extraparliamentary
Hope for Democracy	Maria Karystianou	Justice reform Anti-corruption	did not exist	0 / 300	Extraparliamentary
Greek Left Alliance	Alexis Tsipras	Progressivism Social Democracy	did not exist	0 / 300	Extraparliamentary

== Opinion polling ==
Local regression trend line of poll results from 25 June 2023 to the present day, with each line corresponding to a political party

=== Polling aggregations ===
The following table displays the most recent aggregations of polling results from different organisations.

Polling Aggregator/Link	Last Update	ND	SYRIZA	PASOK	KKE	EL	NIKI	PE	Μ25	FL	NA	SE	DPK	ELPIDA	ELAS	Lead
Dimoskopiseis	21 Oct 2026	29.9; 119	1.7; 0	12.6; 37	6.9; 20	7.5; 22	1.2; 0	4.8; 15	2.7; 0	4.0; 13	–	3.6; 11	1.3; 0	4.9; 15	16.3; 49	13.6
KalpiCast	16 Oct 2026	28.4; 115	2.0; 0	11.8; 37	6.5; 21	7.4; 23	–	5.1; 16	2.8; 0	3.5; 11	–	4.1; 13	1.3; 0	4.8; 15	15.5; 49	12.9
Politico	13 Oct 2026	29	2	14	7	7	1	4	3	2	–	4	–	4	16	13
PolitPro	21 Oct 2026	29.7	1.8	13.0	6.9	7.2	1.3	4.5	2.9	3.6	–	4.0	1.4	4.6	16.2	13.5
Europe Elects	9 Oct 2026	30	2	13	6	7	1	4	3	3	1	–	1	5	16	14
