= Opinion polling for the next Greek parliamentary election =

In the run-up to the next Greek parliamentary election estimated to be in summer of 2027, various organizations carry out opinion polling to gauge voting intention in Greece. Results of such polls are displayed in this article. The date range for these opinion polls is from the June 2023 Greek parliamentary election to the present day.

Polls are listed in reverse chronological order, showing the most recent first and using the dates when the survey fieldwork was done, as opposed to the date of publication. Where the fieldwork dates are unknown, the date of publication is given instead. The highest percentage figure in each polling survey is displayed with its background shaded in the leading party's colour. If a tie ensues, this is applied to the figures with the highest percentages. The "Lead" columns on the right shows the percentage point difference between the parties with the highest percentages in a given poll.

== Voting intention estimates ==
=== Graphical summary ===
Local regression trend line of poll results from 25 June 2023 to the present day, with each line corresponding to a political party

=== Polling ===
The table below lists nationwide voting intention estimates. Refusals are generally excluded from the party vote percentages, while question wording and the treatment of "don't know" responses and those not intending to vote may vary between polling organisations. Polls that show their results without disregarding those respondents who were undecided or said they would abstain from voting (either physically or by voting blank) have been re-calculated by disregarding these numbers from the totals offered through a simple rule of three in order to obtain results comparable to other polls and the official election results. When available, seat projections are displayed below the percentages in a smaller font. 151 seats are required for an absolute majority in the Hellenic Parliament.

Polling firm/commissioner	Fieldwork date	Sample size	ND	SYRIZA	PASOK	KKE	SP	EL	NIKI	PE	M25	FL	NA	SE	DPK	ELPIDA	ELAS	Lead
Palmos Analysis/Eleftheros Typos	13–19 Nov 2026	1,000	30.2; 122	2.5; 0	12.9; 39	6.8; 21	1.5; 0	7.0; 21	2.3; 0	5.0; 15	2.9; 0	4.5; 14	0.6; 0	3.4; 10	0.6; 0	3.5; 11	15.3; 49	14.9
Alco/Flash	13–17 Nov 2026	1,000	27.7	1.7	13.2	8.3	–	6.9	2.0	4.7	2.9	3.0	–	4.0	0.6	3.7	15.7	12.0
Metron Analysis/Mega	11–17 Nov 2026	1,303	29.5; 120	2.3; 0	13.3; 41	6.2; 19	–	5.4; 17	1.0; 0	5.2; 6	2.9; 0	4.9; 15	–	3.3; 10	–	4.8; 15	15.3; 47	14.2
Pulse/Skai	11–14 Nov 2026	1,109	30.0	3.0	13.0	6.5	–	7.5	–	5.5	3.0	4.0	–	4.0	–	4.0	16.0	14.0
Opinion Poll/Action24	10–13 Nov 2026	1,001	30.3; 119	1.6; 0	12.6; 37	7.1; 21	–	7.2; 21	1.3; 0	5.8; 17	2.1; 0	3.9; 12	–	4.0; 12	–	4.5; 14	15.9; 47	14.4
Marc/Ant1	9–11 Nov 2026	1,218	30.5	1.4	12.5	6.8	–	7.0	1.4	5.5	2.4	3.9	–	4.2	–	4.6	15.8	14.7
Real Polls/Protagon	6–9 Nov 2026	1,569	30.1	0.6	12.0	6.3	0.4	5.5	1.1	5.5	4.0	3.7	0.2	5.7	0.7	4.2	17.2	12.9
Interview/Political	5–7 Nov 2026	2,985	29.4; 116	2.2; 0	14.5; 43	5.4; 16	–	7.3; 22	0.7; 0	3.3; 10	3.5; 10	3.8; 11	0.8; 0	3.6; 11	2.0; 0	4.6; 14	15.7; 47	13.7
Alco/Alpha	22–30 Oct 2026	1,000	27.8	2.1	13.6	8.5	–	6.9	2.0	4.4	3.0	2.6	–	3.8	0.8	3.7	15.9	11.9
Interview/Politic	22–25 Oct 2026	3,365	30.1	2.2	14.3	5.9	–	7.4	1.4	3.3	3.5	3.5	0.6	3.7	2.2	4.2	15.4	14.7
Pulse/Skai	17–20 Oct 2026	1,107	30.0	2.5	13.0	6.5	–	7.5	–	5.5	3.0	3.5	–	4.0	–	4.0	16.5	13.5
GPO/iefimerida	16–19 Oct 2026	1,000	29.4	2.0	13.1	9.4	–	8.5	1.5	4.7	2.2	3.8	–	2.8	–	2.6	15.7	13.7
Metron Analysis/Mega	14–20 Oct 2026	1,300	30.0; 119	1.7; 0	13.0; 38	5.8; 17	–	6.2; 18	1.5; 0	5.7; 17	3.0; 9	5.3; 16	–	3.5; 10	–	4.0; 12	15.0; 44	15.0
Marc/Ant1	12–14 Oct 2026	1,209	30.4; 121	1.8; 0	12.4; 37	7.0; 21	–	7.0; 21	1.7; 0	5.5; 16	2.6; 0	3.6; 11	–	4.2; 13	–	4.5; 13	15.8; 47	14.6
Alco/Flash	8–13 Oct 2026	1,000	28.2	2.3	13.3	8.4	–	6.6	2.1	4.2	2.9	1.8	–	4.7	0.8	3.6	16.4	11.8
Opinion Poll/Action24	7–10 Oct 2026	1,005	30.3; 122	1.7; 0	12.3; 37	7.2; 21	–	6.8; 20	1.1; 0	5.1; 16	2.7; 0	3.5; 11	–	3.5; 11	–	4.5; 14	15.9; 48	14.4
Interview/Political	6–10 Oct 2026	3,043	29.6	2.2	14.6	6.1	–	7.6	0.5	3.0	3.3	3.7	0.4	3.7	2.0	4.3	15.7	13.9
Interview/Politic	23–28 Sep 2026	4,928	29.6	2.2	14.0	6.6	–	8.6	0.7	3.0	3.3	3.9	0.3	–	1.4	4.4	15.4	14.2
Real Polls/Protagon	18–21 Sep 2026	1,554	29.7	0.8	10.8	5.8	1.4	6.2	0.8	4.9	2.5	4.6	0.9	–	0.8	7.5	17.9	11.8
Metron Analysis/Mega	16–22 Sep 2026	1,307	30.2; 120	1.5; 0	12.6; 38	6.1; 18	–	6.9; 21	1.7; 0	5.8; 17	3.5; 10	5.3; 16	–	–	1.2; 0	4.4; 11	15.8; 47	14.4
Alco/Alpha	15–19 Sep 2026	1,000	28.7	2.4	13.1	7.3	–	7.6	1.5	4.1	3.1	2.6	–	–	0.8	3.7	17.0	11.7
MRB/Open	15–16 Sep 2026	1,000	29.0	1.2	12.4	6.7	–	9.4	–	3.9	2.3	3.8	–	–	1.6	5.2	17.4	11.6
Palmos Analysis/TheOpinion	14–18 Sep 2026	1,021	30.1; 122	1.5; 0	12.8; 39	6.9; 21	2.0; 0	6.2; 19	1.2; 0	5.1; 16	3.0; 9	4.1; 12	0.9; 0	–	0.8; 0	5.2; 16	15.2; 46	14.9
GPO/Parapolitika	14–16 Sep 2026	1,000	30.3	1.5	13.1	8.7	–	8.9	1.2	4.7	2.1	4.0	1.2	–	–	3.8	15.8	14.5
Marc/Ant1	14–16 Sep 2026	1,272	31.0	1.6	11.5	6.8	1.4	7.2	1.3	5.5	3.2	3.5	–	–	1.0	5.5	16.0	15.0
Pulse/Skai	13–15 Sep 2026	1,106	30.5	2.5	12.0	7.0	–	8.5	–	5.5	3.0	3.5	–	–	–	5.5	17.0	13.5
Opinion Poll/Action24	11–15 Sep 2026	1,008	31.0; 126	1.8; 0	12.1; 38	6.8; 21	1.3; 0	7.3; 24	1.1; 0	5.4; 17	2.5; 0	3.3; 10	0.5; 0	–	1.3; 0	4.8; 15	15.9; 49	15.1
Prorata/EfSyn	7–10 Sep 2026	1,100	29.0	1.7	10.2	6.8	–	9.1	0.6	4.0	3.4	4.5	1.1	–	1.1	5.1	18.8	10.2
GPO/Star	7–8 Sep 2026	1,200	30.6	1.3	12.8	8.8	–	9.0	1.2	4.9	2.1	3.7	1.4	–	–	3.6	16.0	14.6
Interview/Political	26 Aug–1 Sep 2026	4,082	29.1	2.8	13.2	7.0	–	9.4	0.7	3.1	3.0	3.9	0.5	–	1.8	4.8	15.5	13.6
Interview/Politic	18–24 Aug 2026	4,082	29.6	2.2	11.2	6.8	–	10.1	0.3	3.3	3.1	3.5	0.6	–	2.4	4.0	16.2	13.4
Marc/ProtoThema	20–23 Jul 2026	1,178	30.8	1.3	11.0	6.7	1.2	7.5	1.4	5.5	3.1	3.5	0.3	–	1.1	7.4	16.8	14.0
Interview/Politic	15–20 Jul 2026	3,419	29.5	1.1	11.1	6.5	–	9.8	0.3	3.2	3.4	3.3	0.5	–	2.6	5.8	17.4	12.1
GPO/iefimerida	6–9 Jul 2026	1,000	29.3	1.6	10.8	9.1	–	9.1	1.7	4.6	1.7	3.2	–	–	–	7.0	16.6	12.7
Alco/Efsyn	6–9 Jul 2026	1,000	29.4	1.4	11.6	7.4	–	8.3	1.7	4.3	3.2	3.0	–	–	0.6	7.7	18.3	11.1
Pulse/Skai	3–7 Jul 2026	1,126	30.0	2.0	11.5	7.0	–	8.0	1.0	5.0	3.0	3.5	–	–	1.0	8.5	17.0	13.0
Interview/Political	2–6 Jul 2026	4,564	30.1	0.7	12.3	5.5	–	8.8	0.6	3.0	2.9	3.1	0.6	–	2.5	7.4	17.4	12.7
Prorata/Efsyn	29 Jun–3 Jul 2026	1,200	28.4	2.3	9.7	6.3	–	8.0	0.6	4.0	3.4	4.5	1.1	–	1.1	9.7	17.6	10.8
MRB/Open	24 Jun–3 Jul 2026	2,000	29.0	1.5	11.1	7.3	–	8.7	–	5.0	3.0	3.3	–	–	2.1	8.8	17.6	12.4
Metron Analysis/Mega	24–30 Jun 2026	1,304	30.4; 120	1.4; 0	11.4; 34	6.2; 19	–	5.7; 17	1.2; 0	5.6; 17	3.1; 9	3.8; 11	–	–	1.0; 0	7.5; 22	17.1; 51	13.3
Marc/Ant1	23–28 Jun 2026	1,239	30.5	1.2	10.5	6.5	1.1	7.0	1.2	5.3	2.8	2.7	0.9	–	1.3	10.5	16.5	14.0
Alco/Flash	22–26 Jun 2026	1,000	28.5	1.5	12.3	7.6	–	8.0	1.7	3.7	2.7	2.7	–	–	1.2	9.3	17.4	11.1
GPO/Parapolitika	22–24 Jun 2026	1,000	29.4	1.2	11.5	9.0	–	9.2	1.1	4.3	2.9	2.6	–	–	–	7.8	16.3	13.1
Real Polls/Protagon	20–22 Jun 2026	1,537	28.3	1.2	9.9	6.4	0.5	5.1	0.9	3.1	2.5	3.6	0.2	–	0.7	11.9	21.4	6.9
Interview/Politic	17–22 Jun 2026	3,419	31.0	0.6	13.6	5.0	–	8.2	0.6	3.3	3.2	4.4	0.3	–	2.2	6.0	16.0	15.0
Alco/Alpha	9–13 Jun 2026	1,000	27.7	1.3	12.3	7.4	–	7.9	1.5	4.3	3.3	3.5	–	–	0.8	9.6	16.9	10.8
Interview/Political	3–8 Jun 2026	4,068	31.2; 130	0.6; 0	14.7; 43	4.6; 13	–	8.2; 24	0.4; 0	3.3; 10	2.5; 0	4.0; 12	0.4; 0	–	2.0; 0	8.1; 24	16.0; 44	15.2
Palmos Analysis/Eleftheros Typos	3–5 Jun 2026	1,008	28.1	2.0	10.3	6.6	1.6	7.0	1.4	5.4	2.4	4.0	1.2	–	1.2	10.3	14.3	14.2
Prorata/EfSyn	28 May–3 Jun 2026	1,200	27.4	2.3	9.7	6.9	–	9.1	0.6	4.0	3.4	4.0	1.1	–	1.1	10.9	16.6	10.8
GPO/Star	28 May–2 Jun 2026	1,200	28.6	1.3	12.4	8.6	–	8.9	1.6	4.7	2.5	2.4	–	–	–	10.5	15.1	13.5
Marc/ProtoThema	27 May–4 Jun 2026	1,564	30.8; 123	1.8; 0	10.3; 31	6.8; 20	1.2; 0	6.8; 20	1.5; 0	5.4; 16	2.1; 0	3.7; 11	0.5; 0	–	0.5; 0	10.9; 32	15.7; 47	15.1
Pulse/Skai	27–31 May 2026	1,108	29.5	2.5	11.5	7.0	–	6.5	1.0	5.0	3.0	3.5	–	–	1.0	11.0	15.5	14.0
Opinion Poll/Action24	27–29 May 2026	1,005	30.5	1.7	10.5	6.5	0.7	5.9	1.4	5.0	1.5	1.7	0.5	–	0.7	12.6	15.5	15.0
Alco/Flash	26–28 May 2026	1,000	28.4	1.8	12.1	7.7	–	7.6	2.1	3.9	3.1	3.3	–	–	1.1	11.5	15.5	12.9
Metron Analysis/Mega	25 May–2 Jun 2026	1,300	28.5; 113	2.3; 0	11.2; 34	5.8; 18	–	6.0; 18	1.2; 0	6.8; 21	3.1; 9	3.3; 10	–	–	–	10.4; 31	15.2; 46	13.3
Real Polls/Protagon	23–25 May 2026	1,667	29.1	1.2	9.6	7.4	0.3	5.6	2.0	4.5	1.7	4.1	0.5	–	2.0	13.1	16.1	13.0
Interview/Politic	21–25 May 2026	3,178	29.5	0.5	13.5	5.1	–	7.0	0.7	3.6	3.0	4.5	0.6	–	2.9	8.5	14.4	15.1
Interview/Political	5–11 May 2026	4,263	30.1	1.0	14.9	5.8	–	5.7	0.9	5.5	3.1	3.5	0.7	–	2.0	8.7	15.1	15.0
Alco/Alpha	5–9 May 2026	1,001	28.1	4.2	15.1	8.6	–	9.9	2.5	7.0	3.1	3.2	1.2	–	1.1	–	–	13.0
MRB/Open	4–6 May 2026	1,000	28.8	5.0	14.5	7.7	–	10.9	2.3	10.1	2.8	4.0	1.2	–	3.2	–	–	14.3
Pulse/Skai	3–5 May 2026	1,059	29.5	4.5	14.5	8.0	1.0	9.0	2.0	9.0	3.0	3.5	1.0	–	2.0	–	–	15.0
Opinion Poll/Action24	27–30 Apr 2026	1,005	31.2	4.3	14.4	7.8	1.1	9.4	1.7	8.2	2.8	4.3	1.0	–	1.1	–	–	16.8
N. Kardoulas/Aftodioikisi	25–29 Apr 2026	1,250	23.5	2.5	15.0	6.5	1.0	7.0	1.0	4.0	2.5	4.5	0.5	–	2.0	14.5	11.0	8.5
Marc/ProtoThema	23–28 Apr 2026	1,141	32.2	6.8	13.5	8.0	1.5	9.2	2.3	9.5	2.9	3.4	1.0	–	2.7	–	–	18.7
Prorata/efsyn	22–28 Apr 2026	1,100	28.7	5.8	12.9	8.8	–	9.9	1.8	8.2	3.5	4.1	1.8	–	1.8	–	–	15.8
Metron Analysis/Mega	21–27 Apr 2026	1,300	28.6; 119	5.3; 17	15.0; 49	8.4; 27	0.5; 0	10.2; 33	1.9; 0	10.4; 34	3.1; 10	3.5; 11	2.4; 0	–	–	–	–	13.6
GPO/Parapolitika	20–23 Apr 2026	1,000	29.6	5.9	15.9	10.0	–	10.2	2.5	8.6	1.9	2.7	1.6	–	1.1	–	–	13.7
Real Polls/Protagon	18–20 Apr 2026	1,631	30.6	5.1	15.3	6.3	0.1	7.0	0.8	10.7	5.4	3.7	0.6	–	1.9	–	–	15.3
Interview/Politic	14–20 Apr 2026	4,428	30.2	3.6	15.8	6.3	–	6.3	1.2	3.9	4.0	3.4	1.5	–	3.3	9.3	–	14.4
Interview/Political	1–6 Apr 2026	3,076	33.0	3.3	16.0	6.2	–	7.1	1.3	5.0	4.4	4.4	1.3	–	2.9	–	–	17.0
Alco/Alpha	31 Mar – 4 Apr 2026	1,000	29.2	5.6	14.7	8.4	–	10.6	3.1	7.7	3.6	3.7	1.4	–	1.2	–	–	14.5
Pulse/Skai	29–31 Mar 2026	1,018	31.0	5.0	14.5	8.5	1.0	9.0	2.0	9.0	2.0	3.0	1.0	–	1.0	–	–	16.5
GPO/Star	28–30 Mar 2026	1,200	32.0	4.6	14.9	9.9	–	10.8	2.8	8.5	2.3	2.8	1.2	–	1.5	–	–	17.1
Palmos Analysis/TheOpinion	26–31 Mar 2026	1,004	31.3; 132	6.8; 22	13.6; 43	7.8; 25	2.0; 0	8.8; 28	3.5; 11	12.2; 39	2.7; 0	2.4; 0	0.9; 0	–	1.4; 0	–	–	17.7
Interview/Politic	18–22 Mar 2026	3,167	34.4	4.2	15.7	6.6	–	6.3	1.6	6.0	4.1	4.0	1.7	–	2.9	–	–	18.7
GPO/iefimerida	17–20 Mar 2026	1,000	31.4	5.5	13.7	9.4	–	10.6	1.9	9.6	2.5	2.5	2.2	–	1.8	–	–	17.7
MRB/Open	16–18 Mar 2026	1,000	31.1	4.6	14.0	8.1	–	11.5	3.1	10.6	2.6	3.5	1.4	–	2.8	–	–	16.5
Metron Analysis/Mega	11–17 Mar 2026	1,311	31.1; 130	4.6; 15	13.6; 43	8.0; 25	0.4; 0	8.9; 28	2.0; 0	10.5; 33	4.6; 16	4.0; 13	2.0; 0	–	–	–	–	17.5
Real Polls/Protagon	8–10 Mar 2026	1,613	30.8	3.9	14.9	7.4	0.8	8.1	1.7	12.7	3.5	3.1	1.1	–	2.0	–	–	15.9
Pulse/Skai	7–10 Mar 2026	1,056	31.5	6.0	13.5	8.0	–	9.0	2.0	9.5	2.5	3.5	1.0	–	1.5	–	–	18.0
Interview/Political	5–9 Mar 2026	3,175	34.1	3.5	15.4	7.5	–	7.0	1.4	5.5	4.2	3.7	1.3	–	2.8	–	–	18.7
Opinion Poll/Action24	4–6 Mar 2026	1,004	32.7	4.7	13.2	7.8	1.5	9.2	1.9	9.6	2.9	4.9	1.0	–	1.7	–	–	19.5
Alco/Alpha	2–7 Mar 2026	1,000	30.9	5.2	13.3	9.1	–	10.7	2.7	8.9	3.8	3.3	1.2	–	1.5	–	–	17.6
Interview/Politic	18–23 Feb 2026	3,519	31.6	4.2	13.8	7.0	–	7.4	1.3	8.3	3.9	4.1	1.1	–	2.9	–	–	17.8
GPO/iefimerida	12–14 Feb 2026	1,000	30.1	5.6	13.2	9.2	–	10.9	2.2	11.1	2.5	2.3	2.2	–	2.1	–	–	16.9
Metron Analysis/Mega	11–17 Feb 2026	1,311	29.4; 122	5.4; 17	12.7; 41	8.3; 26	0.5; 0	10.9; 35	1.9; 0	11.2; 36	3.3; 10	4.2; 13	1.9; 0	–	1.3; 0	–	–	16.7
Marc/ProtoThema	9–18 Feb 2026	1,314	31.4	6.4	13.0	8.0	1.4	10.0	2.2	11.5	2.8	4.2	1.4	–	2.5	–	–	18.4
Real Polls/Protagon	7–9 Feb 2026	1,715	28.9	5.3	12.7	8.8	0.4	9.1	0.9	11.9	5.2	4.6	1.3	–	1.5	–	–	16.2
Interview/Political	4–9 Feb 2026	3,387	31.9	3.9	14.0	6.5	–	7.3	2.2	8.3	3.8	3.5	1.4	–	3.1	–	–	17.9
Alco/Alpha	27–31 Jan 2026	1,000	28.8	4.5	12.9	8.7	–	11.5	2.7	9.7	3.1	3.4	1.6	–	2.2	–	–	15.9
MRB/Open	26–28 Jan 2026	1,000	29.2	4.6	12.7	7.9	–	12.7	2.9	13.2	2.6	3.4	1.3	–	2.1	–	–	16.0
GPO/Star	23–27 Jan 2026	1,200	30.2	5.2	13.3	8.4	–	11.8	2.3	10.1	2.6	3.5	2.5	–	2.2	–	–	16.9
Interview/Politic	22–26 Jan 2026	3,129	32.3	3.5	15.2	5.3	–	6.5	2.4	7.6	4.4	4.1	1.1	–	2.9	–	–	17.1
Pulse/Skai	16–19 Jan 2026	1,123	29.5	5.5	13.0	8.0	1.0	9.5	2.0	10.0	3.0	4.0	2.0	–	2.0	–	–	16.5
Metron Analysis/Mega	14–20 Jan 2026	1,309	28.5; 126	3.9; 14	12.5; 43	8.0; 28	0.6; 0	10.7; 37	2.5; 0	11.7; 41	2.7; 0	3.3; 11	2.5; 0	–	1.7; 0	–	–	16.0
Opinion Poll/Action24	14–16 Jan 2026	1,003	30.2	4.2	13.4	8.2	1.1	10.1	2.1	10.4	2.4	4.2	1.2	–	1.5	–	–	16.8
GPO/Parapolitika	12–15 Jan 2026	1,000	28.9	5.0	13.7	9.2	–	11.8	2.0	11.1	2.7	2.1	1.8	–	2.2	–	–	15.2
Real Polls/Protagon	11–12 Jan 2026	1,894	28.7	5.3	10.3	7.7	0.9	9.0	0.8	13.6	4.5	4.3	1.6	–	1.2	–	–	15.1
Interview/Political	9–12 Jan 2026	1,709	32.4	4.1	14.9	7.3	–	7.0	1.8	7.3	4.5	4.2	1.3	–	3.3	–	–	17.5
Palmos Analysis/Eleftheros Typos	22–24 & 27–29 Dec 2025	1,043	29.6	6.9	12.3	8.9	2.1	9.7	2.5	11.2	2.1	5.7	1.8	–	1.7	–	–	17.3
Interview/Politic	16–19 Dec 2025	3,519	29.4	4.0	14.8	6.1	–	8.3	1.5	10.4	4.5	4.7	1.4	–	4.2	–	–	14.6
Opinion Poll/Action24	11–16 Dec 2025	1,004	29.7	4.5	13.6	8.6	1.2	11.9	2.6	10.1	3.1	4.0	1.2	–	2.4	–	–	16.1
Pulse/Skai	11–14 Dec 2025	1,102	29.0	6.5	13.5	8.5	1.0	10.0	2.5	11.0	3.0	3.5	2.0	–	2.5	–	–	15.5
GPO/Parapolitika	10–13 Dec 2025	1,000	28.0	5.0	14.6	10.0	–	11.9	2.3	10.1	2.3	2.7	1.7	–	2.3	–	–	13.4
Alco/Alpha	10–13 Dec 2025	1,000	29.8	5.9	14.7	9.2	–	12.0	3.3	8.0	3.0	4.0	1.4	–	2.9	–	–	15.1
Metron Analysis/Mega	9–16 Dec 2025	1,300	27.0	5.5	14.1	8.4	0.5	11.6	2.6	12.5	3.6	4.9	2.7	–	1.4	–	–	12.9
Real Polls/Protagon	6–8 Dec 2025	1,735	28.5	8.5	12.5	7.8	1.3	8.7	1.3	11.8	4.4	4.8	1.6	–	1.8	–	–	16.0
MRB/Open	4–12 Dec 2025	2,000	29.2	7.7	14.1	8.6	–	11.7	2.5	9.7	3.0	5.0	1.5	–	1.9	–	–	15.1
Interview/Political	4–8 Dec 2025	3,452	30.8	4.0	13.8	6.5	–	7.7	1.1	7.5	4.0	6.3	1.5	–	4.0	–	–	13.8
GPO/Star	24–26 Nov 2025	1,200	29.5	4.8	14.7	9.9	–	12.2	2.7	6.8	2.2	3.5	1.7	–	2.5	–	–	14.8
Interview/Politic	20–24 Nov 2025	3,313	30.0	3.6	16.0	5.5	–	7.8	1.6	4.8	4.2	5.3	1.7	–	4.5	–	–	16.0
Marc/ProtoThema	18–26 Nov 2025	1,252	31.0	7.2	14.0	9.0	1.6	9.7	2.7	10.0	3.0	3.6	1.2	–	2.2	–	–	17.0
MRB/Open	18–20 Nov 2025	1,000	29.1	4.8	13.5	8.7	–	11.9	3.0	9.2	2.6	5.9	2.0	–	2.4	–	–	15.6
Pulse/Skai	16–18 Nov 2025	1,105	30.0	6.5	14.0	8.5	1.5	10.0	2.5	8.5	4.0	4.0	2.5	–	2.5	–	–	16.0
Palmos Analysis/Eleftheros Typos	12–19 Nov 2025	1,030	30.1; 121	4.9; 15	12.4; 38	10.3; 32	2.0; 0	9.9; 31	3.5; 11	9.7; 30	3.5; 11	5.2; 16	1.7; 0	–	1.8; 0	–	–	17.7
GPO/Parapolitika	11–18 Nov 2025	1,001	29.1	5.9	15.2	8.9	–	12.2	2.9	7.8	2.4	3.0	1.7	–	2.8	–	–	13.9
Metron Analysis/Mega	11–18 Nov 2025	1,313	29.3; 123	6.1; 20	13.5; 43	7.5; 24	0.7; 0	10.0; 32	1.9; 0	9.8; 32	3.7; 12	4.4; 14	2.2; 0	–	2.7; 0	–	–	15.8
Opinion Poll/Action24	10–11 Nov 2025	1,066	30.2	4.2	13.7	8.1	1.2	10.7	2.5	9.0	3.4	4.5	1.2	–	2.7	–	–	16.5
Real Polls/Protagon	9–10 Nov 2025	1,765	30.6	5.6	13.9	7.2	1.5	9.8	1.9	7.6	4.3	5.9	1.7	–	2.2	–	–	16.7
Interview/Political	6–10 Nov 2025	3,065	29.2	3.7	15.0	7.9	–	8.1	1.6	5.7	5.3	6.0	1.4	–	5.0	–	–	14.2
Alco/Alpha	29 Oct – 2 Nov 2025	1,000	29.7	6.4	14.9	9.0	–	11.3	2.5	8.2	3.1	4.3	1.8	–	3.2	–	–	14.8
Interview/Politic	23–28 Oct 2025	3,313	29.3	3.2	16.0	7.1	–	7.9	1.5	6.6	3.9	4.5	1.9	–	4.5	–	–	13.3
Pulse/Skai	17–20 Oct 2025	1,112	29.0	6.5	13.5	9.5	1.0	10.0	2.5	9.5	3.0	4.0	2.5	–	2.5	–	–	15.5
Metron Analysis/Mega	14–20 Oct 2025	1,300	28.7	4.9	12.8	10.0	0.5	11.7	2.8	9.9	3.1	3.6	2.0	–	3.2	–	–	15.9
Marc/Ant1	13–17 Oct 2025	1,107	30.5	7.0	14.0	8.4	1.7	9.5	2.5	10.8	3.2	3.8	1.0	–	2.6	–	–	16.5
MRB/Open	13–15 Oct 2025	1,000	28.0	4.3	13.8	8.6	–	12.1	1.7	9.4	2.7	5.2	2.0	–	2.9	–	–	14.2
GPO/Parapolitika	8–11 Oct 2025	1,000	28.6	5.4	15.4	8.8	–	11.5	2.6	8.8	2.5	3.2	1.8	–	2.8	–	–	13.2
Opinion Poll/Action24	7–10 Oct 2025	1,005	30.1	4.5	13.8	7.6	–	11.1	2.3	10.9	3.2	4.5	1.2	–	2.6	–	–	16.3
Interview/Political	1–8 Oct 2025	3,282	31.5	4.0	15.3	6.5	–	8.2	1.5	6.9	5.8	4.6	1.8	–	4.8	–	–	16.2
Alco/Alpha	23–27 Sep 2025	1,000	29.6	7.7	14.2	8.8	–	11.5	2.6	8.8	3.1	4.4	1.6	–	2.8	–	–	15.4
GPO/Star	22-24 Sep 2025	1,200	30.0	6.3	14.9	9.6	–	11.9	2.8	9.6	2.4	3.4	1.8	–	2.5	–	–	15.1
Interview/Politic	18–22 Sep 2025	3,050	29.7	5.4	15.0	7.4	–	8.1	1.5	7.6	4.0	4.2	2.8	–	4.4	–	–	14.7
Palmos Analysis/TheOpinion	15–19 Sep 2025	1,058	29.3	4.4	13.6	8.8	1.6	11.9	2.5	9.9	3.4	4.2	2.0	–	2.0	–	–	15.7
Prorata/EfSyn	15–19 Sep 2025	1,038	27.0	8.0	13.2	9.2	–	11.5	2.3	9.2	4.0	4.6	1.7	–	1.7	–	–	13.8
MRB/Open	15–17 Sep 2025	1,000	28.1	5.2	13.7	8.1	–	12.0	3.1	11.1	3.7	4.1	2.1	–	3.1	–	–	14.4
Pulse/Skai	14–16 Sep 2025	1,129	29.0	7.0	14.0	8.5	1.5	9.5	3.0	10.5	3.5	3.5	2.5	–	2.5	–	–	15.0
Metron Analysis/Mega	10–16 Sep 2025	1,300	28.2; 116	6.2; 20	13.6; 43	8.1; 26	0.4; 0	11.8; 37	1.9; 0	10.2; 32	4.2; 13	4.1; 13	2.5; 0	–	2.2; 0	–	–	14.6
Real Polls/Protagon	10–11 Sep 2025	1,820	27.9	7.9	13.8	7.6	1.3	10.8	1.1	9.5	6.3	5.3	2.5	–	1.8	–	–	14.1
GPO/Parapolitika	8–10 Sep 2025	1,000	29.7	6.6	14.3	10.4	–	11.1	2.3	10.0	1.8	3.9	1.8	–	3.0	–	–	15.4
Opinion Poll/Action24	8–10 Sep 2025	1,002	30.5	4.2	14.0	7.4	1.3	11.5	2.4	11.7	3.4	4.3	1.6	–	2.7	–	–	16.5
Interview/Political	8–10 Sep 2025	3,432	26.7	4.1	14.6	8.8	–	9.8	2.3	5.6	4.2	4.9	2.6	–	4.2	–	–	12.1
Interview/Politic	21–25 Aug 2025	2,848	25.9	4.5	14.8	7.8	–	10.1	2.1	10.0	5.0	5.2	1.4	–	5.3	–	–	11.1
GPO/Parapolitika	21–23 Jul 2025	1,500	28.7	6.3	14.0	9.0	–	11.8	2.4	13.1	1.3	3.6	1.8	–	3.0	–	–	14.7
Prorata/Newsbomb	11–16 Jul 2025	1,000	27.0	8.0	13.5	9.5	–	10.5	3.0	11.5	4.0	3.5	2.5	–	2.5	–	–	13.5
Real Polls/Protagon	11–14 Jul 2025	1,668	29.4	6.6	12.5	7.8	1.4	10.1	1.0	11.0	4.9	5.6	1.2	–	3.4	–	–	17.0
Opinion Poll/Action24	2–4 Jul 2025	1,002	29.8	5.5	13.9	8.0	1.2	10.5	3.1	13.7	3.3	2.6	1.7	–	3.1	–	–	15.9
Pulse/Skai	27 Jun–1 Jul 2025	1,212	28.5	7.5	13.5	8.0	1.5	9.0	3.5	12.0	3.5	2.5	2.5	–	3.5	–	–	15.0
Interview/Politic	19–23 Jun 2025	1,915	31.3	3.6	14.5	7.1	–	8.5	2.8	10.3	3.9	4.0	2.0	–	4.5	–	–	16.8
Metron Analysis/Mega	18–24 Jun 2025	1,000	28.5	5.9	13.1	9.9	1.5	9.3	3.7	12.3	3.6	2.8	3.0	–	3.0	–	–	15.4
Real Polls/Protagon	13–16 Jun 2025	1,702	31.5	6.9	13.0	7.0	2.0	8.4	1.6	12.3	3.7	3.6	1.9	–	3.2	–	–	18.5
MRB/Open	11–20 Jun 2025	2,000	30.2	6.3	14.0	8.9	–	10.8	2.9	13.6	3.1	2.6	1.9	–	2.9	–	–	16.2
Alco/Alpha	10–14 Jun 2025	1,001	30.4	6.1	13.0	9.2	–	9.6	3.2	11.5	3.3	3.3	1.9	–	3.2	–	–	17.4
GPO/Parapolitika	10–13 Jun 2025	1,000	30.3	6.1	14.7	8.4	–	10.8	2.6	14.6	1.2	3.5	1.8	–	2.8	–	–	15.6
Interview/Political	4–9 Jun 2025	1,825	28.3	4.2	14.2	8.3	1.5	10.5	3.0	9.6	3.5	2.8	2.2	–	3.8	–	–	14.1
Opinion Poll/Libre	2–5 Jun 2025	1,002	30.6	5.8	13.7	8.1	1.1	9.8	3.2	15.8	3.1	2.1	1.2	–	3.2	–	–	14.8
GPO/Star	30 May–3 Jun 2025	1,200	29.6	6.7	14.3	9.1	–	11.3	2.3	14.5	2.1	2.5	1.5	–	2.9	–	–	15.1
Alco/Epikaira	29 May–3 Jun 2025	1,000	29.4	8.1	12.4	9.3	–	9.5	3.5	12.9	3.1	3.6	1.4	–	3.0	–	–	16.5
MRB/Open	26–28 May 2025	1,000	29.7	5.5	13.2	8.5	–	10.7	3.5	15.6	3.5	2.6	1.4	–	3.5	–	–	14.1
Pulse RC/Skai	24–27 May 2025	1,170	29.0	6.5	13.5	8.0	2.0	9.0	3.5	13.5	3.5	3.0	2.5	–	3.5	–	–	15.5
Interview/Politic	21–26 May 2025	1,905	30.1	5.3	14.2	8.7	1.4	8.8	3.7	11.0	3.6	3.5	1.4	–	3.5	–	–	15.9
Opinion Poll/Action24	19–21 May 2025	1,001	30.4	5.8	13.4	8.2	1.0	9.6	3.0	16.0	2.4	2.9	1.2	–	2.9	–	–	14.4
Metron Analysis/Mega	14–20 May 2025	1,303	30.2	6.1	14.0	8.7	0.6	8.6	3.1	14.2	2.6	1.8	2.4	–	3.0	–	–	16.0
Marc/ProtoThema	12–15 May 2025	1,103	30.6	6.2	13.8	7.8	1.2	8.2	3.2	15.6	2.6	2.7	1.1	–	3.4	–	–	15.0
Real Polls/Protagon	9–12 May 2025	1,723	31.9	5.0	12.9	7.3	0.7	7.1	2.4	18.9	2.6	2.6	1.9	–	2.3	–	–	13.0
Interview/Political	6–11 May 2025	1,805	30.0	5.0	14.1	8.1	1.7	9.7	4.1	8.9	3.8	3.3	1.9	–	4.3	–	–	15.9
Alco/Alpha	28–30 Apr; 2–3 May 2025	1,000	29.4	8.0	12.4	8.5	–	10.0	3.7	13.8	2.6	3.2	1.3	–	2.9	–	–	15.6
Opinion Poll/Action24	28 Apr–2 May 2025	1,003	30.0	6.1	13.0	8.4	–	10.5	3.2	16.5	2.6	3.0	1.6	–	2.7	–	–	13.5
GPO/Parapolitika	28–30 Apr 2025	1,000	28.7	6.6	14.3	9.5	–	10.8	3.2	14.6	1.3	2.3	2.2	–	2.3	–	–	14.1
Pulse RC/Skai	25–28 Apr 2025	1,144	29.0	7.0	13.0	8.5	1.0	9.5	3.5	14.0	3.0	3.0	3.0	–	3.0	–	–	15.0
Interview/Politic	24–28 Apr 2025	1,905	29.0	4.8	13.2	7.9	1.2	8.9	4.0	12.8	3.6	3.9	1.5	–	4.2	–	–	15.8
MRB/Open	7–9 Apr 2025	1,000	26.9	6.6	12.4	7.4	–	11.3	4.0	17.8	3.3	3.7	2.0	–	3.2	–	–	9.1
Interview/Political	4–8 Apr 2025	1,515	27.0	5.5	12.5	8.5	1.7	9.0	3.9	14.6	3.4	3.7	1.1	–	3.3	–	–	12.4
Real Polls/Protagon	4–7 Apr 2025	1,740	29.7	6.6	10.5	7.6	1.5	8.8	2.3	17.9	4.2	3.5	0.8	–	3.4	–	–	11.8
Prorata/Attica	3–7 Apr 2025	1,000	25.5	7.5	13.5	9.0	–	12.5	3.0	15.5	3.0	4.0	2.0	–	2.0	–	–	10.0
Metron Analysis/Mega	2–8 Apr 2025	1,300	27.3	6.9	12.5	8.3	1.2	10.4	2.1	15.0	2.7	3.1	2.5	–	1.7	–	–	12.3
GPO/Parapolitika	31 Mar–4 Apr 2025	1,000	26.6	6.5	14.6	9.7	–	11.1	3.1	15.3	2.1	3.3	2.2	–	2.3	–	–	11.3
Marc/Ant1	27 Mar–1 Apr 2025	1,139	28.6	7.6	13.3	7.5	1.3	8.8	3.2	16.2	3.2	3.3	1.2	–	3.5	–	–	12.4
Interview/Politic	21–26 Mar 2025	1,545	25.5	6.7	12.5	9.9	1.7	10.9	3.2	14.1	3.6	4.0	2.2	–	3.3	–	–	11.4
GPO/Parapolitika	18–19 Mar 2025	1,000	26.9	6.5	15.6	9.0	–	10.5	3.2	15.0	2.1	3.7	2.2	–	2.2	–	–	11.3
Pulse RC/Skai	16–18 Mar 2025	1,144	27.5	8.0	14.0	8.0	0.5	9.5	4.0	14.0	3.0	4.0	2.5	–	2.5	–	–	13.5
Opinion Poll/Action24	14–18 Mar 2025	1,003	28.1	6.0	14.3	8.3	1.2	11.4	3.1	15.9	2.3	4.1	1.2	–	2.4	–	–	12.2
Metron Analysis/Mega	12–18 Mar 2025	1,309	26.4	7.3	13.3	8.4	0.8	9.9	4.7	14.6	2.9	3.9	2.7	–	2.8	–	–	11.8
Alco/Alpha	12–16 Mar 2025	1,000	27.8	8.1	13.9	9.3	–	9.8	3.2	12.3	3.2	3.9	1.3	–	2.1	–	–	13.9
Interview/Political	10–12 Mar 2025	2,195	25.8	5.0	13.1	9.6	1.8	10.0	3.0	15.2	3.6	4.3	1.3	–	4.2	–	–	10.6
Real Polls/Protagon	8–10 Mar 2025	1,710	27.0	6.0	13.7	8.5	1.9	8.0	3.1	16.6	3.3	3.7	0.9	–	3.1	–	–	10.4
GPO/Flash.gr	6–10 Mar 2025	1,100	27.3	6.9	17.6	9.1	1.4	10.5	2.7	10.5	2.2	4.2	1.9	–	2.3	–	–	9.7
Good Affairs/To Vima	4–6 Mar 2025	2,008	25.7	7.1	13.8	9.2	–	12.4	3.2	11.2	2.3	4.5	1.7	–	3.5	–	–	11.9
MRB/Open	4–6 Mar 2025	1,000	26.7	8.0	15.4	9.0	1.3	11.4	3.1	12.0	3.1	4.7	1.3	–	2.7	–	–	11.3
GPO/Star	1–4 Mar 2025	1,140	27.9	7.2	17.9	9.5	–	11.1	2.7	8.3	2.2	5.1	2.1	–	2.5	–	–	10.0
Pulse RC/Skai	21–24 Feb 2025	1,153	28.5	8.0	15.5	9.0	1.0	10.0	3.0	8.0	3.5	4.5	2.5	–	3.5	–	–	13.0
Prorata/Attica	20–24 Feb 2025	1,000	25.0	9.0	16.5	10.0	–	12.5	2.0	10.0	2.0	6.5	3.0	–	1.5	–	–	8.5
Interview/Politic	19–24 Feb 2025	2,605	27.2	6.1	13.5	9.7	2.0	9.7	3.3	9.1	3.3	5.8	1.7	–	4.7	–	–	13.7
Metron Analysis/Mega	12–18 Feb 2025	1,301	28.8	7.6	14.6	9.1	0.4	10.3	2.5	8.9	2.6	4.8	3.3	–	3.2	–	–	14.2
Alco/Alpha	11–16 Feb 2025	1,001	28.7	8.6	15.6	9.0	2.0	8.9	3.9	6.6	2.2	6.7	1.6	–	3.2	–	–	13.1
GPO/Parapolitika	10–14 Feb 2025	1,000	28.3	6.7	17.6	9.1	–	10.9	2.2	7.8	1.9	6.7	1.9	–	3.0	–	–	10.7
Real Polls/Protagon	4–6 Feb 2025	1,617	26.9	5.8	13.8	8.9	1.3	8.5	1.9	10.2	2.2	9.8	2.5	–	5.3	–	–	13.1
GPO/Parapolitika	28–29 Jan 2025	1,000	29.0	6.9	18.9	9.5	–	11.1	2.4	6.2	1.6	6.4	2.2	–	2.4	–	–	10.1
Interview/Political	27–31 Jan 2025	1,000	30.1	8.4	14.5	9.1	1.2	9.9	3.5	4.7	3.7	6.9	1.4	–	4.1	–	–	15.6
MRB/Open	27–29 Jan 2025	1,000	27.9	8.4	16.4	9.4	–	9.5	3.1	7.4	3.1	8.0	1.3	–	4.0	–	–	11.5
GPO/Star	20–22 Jan 2025	1,200	30.9	7.4	19.2	9.4	–	9.2	2.8	4.4	1.7	5.7	2.4	–	3.6	–	–	11.7
Pulse RC/Skai	19–21 Jan 2025	1,124	30.0	8.5	16.0	9.5	1.0	9.5	3.0	4.5	3.0	6.0	2.5	–	4.0	–	–	14.0
Metron Analysis/Mega	15–21 Jan 2025	1,305	29.1	8.1	17.4	8.5	0.4	9.8	3.0	4.5	3.3	7.1	1.8	–	3.1	–	–	11.7
Alco/Alpha	15–19 Jan 2025	1,000	30.1	8.7	16.5	9.8	–	8.7	3.9	4.9	3.0	5.6	1.4	–	3.4	–	–	13.6
Interview/Politic	14–20 Jan 2025	2,555	30.5	6.4	16.0	8.5	1.7	8.7	3.4	4.2	2.7	6.9	1.6	–	5.2	–	–	14.5
Opinion Poll/Action24	8–10 Jan 2025	1,003	30.8	7.5	17.4	8.6	1.2	8.6	2.9	5.9	2.9	6.1	2.1	–	4.2	–	–	13.4
Marc/Ant1	7–10 Jan 2025	1,198	31.4	8.5	18.0	8.2	1.0	7.1	3.0	5.0	3.0	4.8	1.4	–	5.1	–	–	13.4
Palmos Analysis/Eleftheros Typos	16–23 Dec 2024	1,043	31.3	8.6	16.3	9.0	2.3	8.1	3.1	4.9	3.5	4.7	1.9	–	3.7	–	–	15.0
Pulse RC/Skai	15–17 Dec 2024	1,121	30.0	8.0	17.0	9.5	1.5	9.0	4.5	5.0	2.5	5.0	2.0	–	5.0	–	–	13.0
Metron Analysis/Mega	11–17 Dec 2024	1,303	29.2	7.4	17.4	9.1	0.6	8.7	3.0	7.3	2.6	5.3	2.8	–	4.1	–	–	11.8
Interview/Politic	11–16 Dec 2024	2,530	29.0	7.3	16.3	8.5	1.9	8.5	3.7	3.4	3.2	6.4	2.5	–	7.1	–	–	12.7
Opinion Poll/Manifesto	11–13 Dec 2024	1,005	30.2	6.6	18.6	7.9	1.7	7.8	4.1	5.8	2.8	6.3	1.6	–	5.1	–	–	11.6
GPO/Parapolitika	9–13 Dec 2024	1,000	30.3	6.9	19.8	9.5	–	9.2	3.3	3.6	1.4	5.8	2.8	–	4.4	–	–	10.5
MRB/Open	4–13 Dec 2024	2,000	28.3	9.9	17.5	9.9	1.2	9.9	3.3	3.8	3.5	5.6	1.6	–	4.3	–	–	10.8
Real Polls/Star	4–7 Dec 2024	2,289	33.2	7.2	16.8	7.4	1.5	7.4	2.6	4.8	3.3	7.4	2.0	–	6.4	–	–	16.4
Prorata/Attica	3–9 Dec 2024	1,100	29.0	8.0	18.5	9.0	–	9.0	3.5	5.0	3.5	4.5	2.5	–	3.0	–	–	10.5
Alco/Alpha	2–7 Dec 2024	1,002	27.9	8.3	18.5	9.2	–	10.2	3.6	5.1	2.3	5.9	1.2	–	5.2	–	–	9.4
Marc/ProtoThema	25–28 Nov 2024	1,072	31.0	7.8	18.7	8.0	1.3	7.7	3.0	5.2	2.8	4.5	1.3	–	5.2	–	–	12.3
Pulse RC/Skai	24–26 Nov 2024	1,129	29.5	8.0	17.0	9.0	2.0	8.0	3.5	4.0	3.0	5.0	2.5	–	5.0	–	–	12.5
Interview/Politic	21–25 Nov 2024	2,785	29.4	4.6	17.0	8.6	1.6	9.2	3.2	3.8	3.2	7.6	2.7	–	6.5	–	–	12.4
Metron Analysis/Mega	20–26 Nov 2024	1,410	27.3	8.1	19.1	10.4	1.0	11.8	3.2	3.4	2.0	4.3	1.9	–	4.2	–	–	8.2
Metron Analysis/Mega	20–26 Nov 2024	1,410	28.6	6.7	18.6	9.9	1.2	9.3	3.6	5.4	2.7	6.2	3.5	–	1.5	–	–	10.0
GPO/Parapolitika	18–22 Nov 2024	1,000	30.6	6.9	20.7	9.4	1.4	9.1	3.8	4.0	1.8	6.3	2.0	–	1.8	–	–	9.9
GPO/Parapolitika	15–16 Nov 2024	1,000	31.6	6.9	20.3	9.4	–	9.3	3.7	4.1	1.8	5.5	2.4	–	3.1	–	–	11.3
Real Polls/Alpha	12–13 Nov 2024	1,759	29.7	3.6	16.7	8.3	–	7.5	2.9	4.7	3.4	8.3	2.9	–	6.5	–	–	13.0
Opinion Poll/Action24	7–12 Nov 2024	1,201	29.8	6.6	20.4	9.4	1.7	9.7	3.0	6.3	2.6	4.8	2.4	–	–	–	–	9.4
Marc/ANT1	22–26 Oct 2024	1,112	31.0	10.3	19.2	8.6	1.7	8.8	3.5	5.0	2.8	4.6	1.7	–	–	–	–	11.8
MRB/Open	21–23 Oct 2024	1,000	28.1	8.3	18.2	9.7	1.7	11.0	3.8	5.3	3.9	4.7	1.6	–	–	–	–	9.9
Metron Analysis/Mega	16–22 Oct 2024	1,306	29.1	8.7	19.8	8.9	1.6	9.0	2.4	5.3	1.8	4.5	4.0	–	–	–	–	9.3
Interview/Politic	16–21 Oct 2024	2,325	29.2	7.7	15.3	9.4	–	8.3	5.2	4.4	4.1	7.0	3.5	–	–	–	–	13.9
Alco/Alpha	15–19 Oct 2024	1,003	29.5	7.7	18.1	10.2	–	11.0	4.6	3.9	3.3	4.8	2.2	–	–	–	–	11.4
GPO/Star	14–16 Oct 2024	1,200	32.7	9.4	17.6	10.2	–	10.0	3.7	4.4	1.8	5.4	2.6	–	–	–	–	15.1
MRB/Open	30 Sep–2 Oct 2024	1,691	28.4	9.7	15.8	10.0	1.3	10.8	3.9	4.5	4.0	4.7	2.7	–	–	–	–	12.6
Pulse RC/Skai	29 Sep–1 Oct 2024	1,311	30.0	11.5	15.5	10.5	2.0	9.5	3.5	4.0	3.0	4.5	2.5	–	–	–	–	14.5
Metron Analysis/Mega	26 Sep–2 Oct 2024	1,700	29.2	8.4	17.2	10.6	1.7	9.9	3.4	4.6	2.6	4.8	3.2	–	–	–	–	12.6
Palmos Analysis/Tvxs	24–28 Sep 2024	1,012	29.3	10.6	18.2	9.7	2.2	7.5	5.2	4.2	3.3	4.1	2.9	–	–	–	–	11.1
Opinion Poll/Action24	24–27 Sep 2024	1,503	32.3	9.2	16.7	10.5	–	9.3	4.0	4.3	2.9	4.5	2.5	–	–	–	–	15.6
Interview/Politic	19–23 Sep 2024	2,814	28.0	8.9	17.1	8.5	–	9.5	3.8	3.6	3.4	6.3	2.9	–	–	–	–	10.9
Prorata/Attica	16–21 Sep 2024	1,200	27.3	10.8	15.3	10.8	–	11.4	4.0	5.1	3.4	4.5	3.4	–	–	–	–	12.0
Metron Analysis/Mega	13–23 Sep 2024	1,603	30.2	8.8	15.5	10.6	1.1	9.0	3.7	4.9	3.6	3.9	3.3	–	–	–	–	14.7
MRB/Open	13–18 Sep 2024	1,591	28.0	9.0	15.5	10.1	1.3	10.6	4.0	5.2	3.6	4.5	2.8	–	–	–	–	12.5
Pulse RC/Skai	13–16 Sep 2024	1,301	30.0	12.5	16.0	9.5	1.0	9.0	4.5	5.0	3.0	4.5	2.0	–	–	–	–	14.0
Alco/Alpha	9–14 Sep 2024	1,000	28.8	11.1	16.0	9.4	–	12.0	4.6	4.0	2.4	4.1	1.5	–	–	–	–	12.8
GPO/Star	8–10 Sep 2024	1,200	33.8	11.5	14.7	10.3	–	10.1	3.3	4.3	1.9	5.1	2.5	–	–	–	–	19.1
Metron Analysis/Mega	5–10 Sep 2024	1,308	29.8	9.5	15.7	9.7	1.0	10.9	4.4	5.3	1.8	5.4	2.6	–	–	–	–	14.1
Data Consultants/Pelop	2–11 Sep 2024	1,143	30.0	9.9	16.6	9.3	–	10.6	4.1	4.2	2.7	3.7	3.2	–	–	–	–	13.4
Interview/Politic	2–6 Sep 2024	1,085	27.2	10.7	14.7	11.2	–	11.7	4.6	4.4	0.0	4.4	1.1	–	–	–	–	12.5
Opinion Poll/Action24	27–30 Aug 2024	1,203	31.1	12.1	15.1	10.1	–	8.5	3.9	4.1	3.1	3.4	2.4	–	–	–	–	14.0
MRB/Open	26–30 Aug 2024	1,611	27.7	10.9	13.4	9.3	–	10.2	4.1	6.8	2.9	4.4	2.8	–	–	–	–	14.3
Interview/Politic	21–26 Aug 2024	2,805	26.5	9.9	14.0	10.4	–	10.5	3.9	4.6	0.0	4.8	1.8	–	–	–	–	12.5
MRB/Open	27 Jun–4 Jul 2024	2,000	29.7	14.5	13.3	9.1	–	8.7	3.5	4.3	3.5	3.2	2.3	–	–	–	–	15.2
Kapa Research/Apogevmatini	25–28 Jun 2024	1,487	34.5	15.4	13.8	9.0	–	9.6	3.8	3.7	2.1	3.4	2.1	–	–	–	–	19.1
Metron Analysis/Mega	21 Jun–1 Jul 2024	1,444	30.4	13.8	12.9	9.9	1.1	9.2	3.0	5.7	3.2	3.1	2.8	–	–	–	–	16.6
GPO/Star	17–19 Jun 2024	1,200	33.9	16.0	14.4	9.3	–	9.3	3.8	3.6	0.0	3.8	2.2	–	–	–	–	17.9
2024 EP election	9 Jun 2024	—N/a	28.3; 117	14.9; 48	12.8; 41	9.3; 30	–	9.3; 30	4.4; 14	3.4; 11	2.5; 0	3.0; 9	2.5; 0	–	–	–	–	13.4
GPO/Parapolitika	4–7 Jun 2024	1,200	32.3	16.1	12.9	8.5	–	8.8	3.9	3.7	2.4	2.9	2.7	–	–	–	–	16.2
Pulse RC/Skai	4–6 Jun 2024	1,169	31.3	16.2	12.8	7.8	–	8.4	3.3	3.3	3.3	2.7	3.3	–	–	–	–	15.1
MRB/Open	4–6 Jun 2024	1,212	31.5	16.0	12.4	8.0	–	8.5	4.0	3.5	3.0	2.8	3.1	–	–	–	–	15.5
Marc/AΝΤ1	3–5 Jun 2024	1,205	33.0	16.6	11.7	7.8	–	8.4	3.6	4.3	2.8	2.6	2.4	–	–	–	–	16.4
Good Affairs/To Vima	2–5 Jun 2024	2,048	32.1	16.7	12.1	8.1	–	8.0	3.2	2.8	2.5	3.0	2.7	–	–	–	–	15.4
Alco/Alpha	2–4 Jun 2024	1,000	31.1	15.2	12.7	8.0	–	8.6	5.5	3.1	3.5	2.6	3.5	–	–	–	–	15.9
Interview/Political	30 May–6 Jun 2024	2,755	30.0	17.2	11.4	7.2	–	8.1	4.9	2.8	2.4	3.3	4.0	–	–	–	–	12.8
Interview/Politic	30 May–3 Jun 2024	2,005	33.8	16.7	11.1	7.8	–	7.8	4.4	2.8	–	–	3.3	–	–	–	–	17.1
Prorata/Attica	29 May–4 Jun 2024	1,000	32.4	13.7	13.2	9.3	–	9.3	3.8	4.4	2.8	2.8	3.8	–	–	–	–	18.7
Opinion Poll/Action24	29 May–1 Jun 2024	1,201	33.0	16.2	12.3	8.0	–	9.0	3.4	3.7	2.6	2.6	2.7	–	–	–	–	16.8
Marc/Proto Thema	29–31 May 2024	1,003	34.5	16.7	11.9	7.3	–	8.4	3.6	4.2	2.7	2.7	2.6	–	–	–	–	17.8
Metron Analysis/Mega	28 May–5 Jun 2024	1,606	32.0	15.5	12.0	7.5	–	8.5	4.5	4.5	3.0	3.0	3.0	–	–	–	–	16.5
Pulse RC/Skai	27–30 May 2024	1,203	32.0	16.5	13.0	7.5	–	8.5	3.5	3.5	3.5	2.4	3.0	–	–	–	–	15.5
Marc/ANT1	27–30 May 2024	1,207	33.4	16.5	11.8	7.6	–	8.8	3.6	4.6	3.0	2.5	2.5	–	–	–	–	16.9
GPO/Star	27–29 May 2024	1,200	33.1	16.2	13.2	8.2	–	8.4	3.6	3.5	2.0	2.2	3.0	–	–	–	–	16.9
Prorata/Attica	22–28 May 2024	1,000	33.3	12.0	13.0	11.2	–	8.5	4.5	3.9	1.7	2.3	4.5	–	–	–	–	20.3
Metron Analysis/Mega	20–24 May 2024	1,311	31.0	15.7	12.9	7.9	–	7.3	3.8	4.2	3.3	2.4	3.0	–	–	–	–	15.3
Good Affairs/Dailypost	18–25 May 2024	1,000	31.1	16.3	11.1	7.8	–	8.1	4.0	3.0	1.6	2.8	2.8	–	–	–	–	14.8
Opinion Poll/Action24	15–16 May 2024	1,006	33.3	15.5	12.1	8.3	–	9.9	3.3	3.8	2.3	2.8	2.8	–	–	–	–	17.8
GPO/Parapolitika	13–16 May 2024	1,200	33.3	15.6	13.2	8.6	–	8.6	3.6	3.2	2.2	2.3	3.0	–	–	–	–	17.7
Alco/Alpha	13–15 May 2024	1,000	32.5	16.0	13.0	9.0	–	10.0	3.5	3.3	2.2	2.4	2.9	–	–	–	–	16.5
Pulse RC/Skai	13–15 May 2024	1,104	33.0	16.0	12.5	8.0	–	9.0	3.5	3.5	3.0	2.4	3.0	–	–	–	–	17.0
Marc/ANT1	10–15 May 2024	1,209	33.8	15.2	12.2	8.0	–	8.3	3.2	4.5	3.0	2.8	3.0	–	–	–	–	18.6
MRB/Open	10–14 May 2024	1,100	32.3	16.0	14.0	8.0	–	9.9	2.9	3.4	2.2	2.8	3.8	–	–	–	–	16.3
Interview/Politic	8–13 May 2024	2,405	33.3	17.2	12.2	6.7	–	7.8	3.4	2.7	2.6	2.7	5.0	–	–	–	–	16.1
Good Affairs/To Vima	25–30 Apr 2024	1,001	31.8	16.1	11.8	8.3	–	10.3	4.2	3.1	2.3	2.1	2.8	–	–	–	–	15.7
Opinion Poll/Action24	20–22 Apr 2024	1,006	33.2	15.1	12.0	8.7	1.3	10.5	3.8	4.0	1.5	1.7	2.9	–	–	–	–	18.1
Marc/Proto Thema	18–25 Apr 2024	1,049	33.4	14.7	11.4	8.5	2.4	9.8	3.4	5.4	2.4	2.2	2.5	–	–	–	–	18.7
GPO/Parapolitika	17–22 Apr 2024	1,400	33.6	16.3	13.5	8.8	2.4	9.1	3.4	3.1	2.1	–	2.7	–	–	–	–	17.3
Metron Analysis/Mega	10–16 Apr 2024	1,304	32.3	15.4	12.0	9.8	2.5	8.3	3.6	4.2	1.6	1.4	3.1	–	–	–	–	16.9
Opinion Poll/Action 24	8–10 Apr 2024	1,006	32.1	15.0	12.4	8.5	2.6	10.7	3.7	3.7	1.3	1.4	3.2	–	–	–	–	17.1
Prorata/Attica	5–10 Apr 2024	1,000	29.5	15.0	12.7	9.2	1.7	9.8	3.5	4.6	2.3	1.7	4.0	–	–	–	–	14.5
Interview/Politic	4–8 Apr 2024	2,355	30.1	15.8	12.8	6.7	1.2	9.3	4.6	2.2	2.4	2.3	4.4	–	–	–	–	14.3
Alco/Alpha	2–5 Apr 2024	1,000	29.9	14.3	13.3	9.4	2.7	9.6	4.2	4.1	2.3	1.4	3.0	–	–	–	–	15.6
Palmos Analysis/Eleftheros Typos	1–4 Apr 2024	1,008	33.9	14.4	11.5	9.0	2.8	10.6	3.5	4.0	–	–	4.1	–	–	–	–	19.5
GPO/Parapolitika	1–3 Apr 2024	1,000	33.4	15.9	14.2	9.0	2.2	9.5	3.3	3.0	1.8	–	2.2	–	–	–	–	17.5
MRB/Open	1–3 Apr 2024	1,000	31.5	15.9	13.4	8.1	2.1	9.9	3.6	4.3	1.9	1.8	3.8	–	–	–	–	15.6
Pulse RC/Skai	1–3 Apr 2024	1,105	33.0	15.0	12.5	8.5	3.0	9.0	3.5	3.5	2.5	1.8	3.0	–	–	–	–	18.0
Opinion Poll/Action24	15–20 Mar 2024	1,010	34.4	13.4	12.5	9.4	2.5	10.1	4.3	2.9	1.9	–	2.8	–	–	–	–	21.0
Metron Analysis/Mega	12–19 Mar 2024	1,317	31.4	15.1	13.0	10.1	2.0	9.7	3.2	4.3	1.9	2.4	3.0	–	–	–	–	16.3
Good Affairs/To Vima	12–14 Mar 2024	3,229	30.8	13.1	12.9	8.2	2.2	9.8	3.6	2.1	2.2	–	2.5	–	–	–	–	17.7
Marc/Proto Thema	11–14 Mar 2024	1,086	35.0	13.5	12.8	9.5	2.7	9.0	3.0	3.1	2.5	–	2.7	–	–	–	–	21.5
GPO/Star	11–13 Mar 2024	1,200	34.8	14.3	13.9	9.5	1.8	8.0	3.4	2.9	2.3	–	3.0	–	–	–	–	20.5
Interview/Politic	7–11 Mar 2024	2,250	32.9	14.1	12.1	7.5	2.2	9.2	5.4	2.3	–	–	4.5	–	–	–	–	18.8
Alco/Alpha	1–6 Mar 2024	1,000	32.8	12.7	14.1	10.8	2.9	7.9	4.5	3.6	2.8	–	3.4	–	–	–	–	18.7
Pulse RC/Skai	27 Feb–1 Mar 2024	1,106	35.5	14.0	14.0	9.0	3.0	8.5	4.0	3.0	2.5	–	3.0	–	–	–	–	21.5
GPO/Parapolitika	26–29 Feb 2024	1,000	36.4	13.5	14.4	10.7	2.2	8.2	3.4	2.4	2.7	–	2.9	–	–	–	–	22.0
Opinion Poll/Action24	26–27 Feb 2024	1,504	33.9	11.9	13.9	10.1	2.7	10.2	4.2	3.5	2.6	–	3.3	–	–	–	–	20.0
MRB/Open	21–27 Feb 2024	1,500	37.2	13.0	14.2	9.0	2.6	10.0	3.2	3.0	2.3	1.2	3.1	–	–	–	–	23.0
Metron Analysis/Mega	14–20 Feb 2024	1,305	36.5	13.3	14.9	8.7	2.0	8.0	4.9	3.1	2.7	1.0	2.5	–	–	–	–	20.6
Opinion Poll/Action24	13–16 Feb 2024	1,004	36.2	12.0	15.0	9.5	2.5	8.7	3.8	3.6	2.2	–	2.7	–	–	–	–	21.2
Interview/Politic	6–12 Feb 2024	2,155	33.8	13.8	12.8	8.1	2.3	8.7	4.8	2.9	–	–	4.6	–	–	–	–	20.0
Alco/Alpha	1–7 Feb 2024	1,201	34.5	12.6	15.0	11.2	2.8	7.5	3.9	3.1	2.2	–	2.6	–	–	–	–	19.5
Pulse RC/Skai	28–30 Jan 2024	1,120	36.0	13.5	14.5	10.0	3.0	7.5	3.5	3.0	2.5	–	2.5	–	–	–	–	21.5
MRB/Open	22–24 Jan 2024	1,000	37.3	13.5	13.7	9.0	3.2	8.2	3.5	3.8	2.4	–	2.6	–	–	–	–	23.6
GPO/Star	20–25 Jan 2024	1,100	38.8	13.2	14.6	9.5	2.5	7.3	3.6	2.6	2.3	–	2.6	–	–	–	–	24.2
Metron Analysis/Mega	17–23 Jan 2024	1,303	35.2	12.1	13.7	10.3	3.2	8.2	2.8	4.0	2.5	–	3.0	–	–	–	–	21.5
Marc/AΝΤ1	17–23 Jan 2024	1,092	39.6	11.7	14.9	9.4	3.1	6.8	3.3	3.1	2.4	–	2.4	–	–	–	–	24.7
Interview/Politic	10–15 Jan 2024	2,388	34.9	14.7	13.6	8.5	2.6	8.2	4.9	2.3	–	–	4.0	–	–	–	–	20.2
Opinion Poll/The Τοc	9–12 Jan 2024	1,005	39.1	13.2	14.4	8.6	1.8	6.7	3.0	3.4	2.0	–	3.1	–	–	–	–	24.7
GPO/Parapolitika	9–11 Jan 2024	1,000	39.4	12.1	14.7	9.9	2.3	7.2	3.2	3.2	2.5	–	2.3	–	–	–	–	24.7
Marc/Proto Thema	8–15 Jan 2024	1,093	38.4	11.2	14.7	10.0	2.8	6.9	3.3	3.5	2.7	–	2.5	–	–	–	–	23.7
Prorata/Attica	5–9 Jan 2024	1,000	36.6	12.8	15.9	11.0	3.7	6.1	3.7	3.0	1.8	–	3.7	–	–	–	–	20.7
Alco/Alpha	2–5 Jan 2024	1,002	35.4	13.8	14.2	11.3	3.2	6.9	3.3	3.3	2.5	–	2.7	–	–	–	–	21.2
Palmos Analysis/Eleftheros Typos	20–28 Dec 2023	1,200	38.7	12.6	14.7	10.3	3.6	5.9	3.1	3.2	2.8	–	2.2	–	–	–	–	24.0
Pulse RC/Skai	18–20 Dec 2023	1,107	37.0	14.0	15.0	10.0	3.5	6.0	3.5	3.0	2.5	–	2.5	–	–	–	–	22.0
Metron Analysis/Mega	13–19 Dec 2023	1,300	38.0	12.4	14.0	10.0	3.0	7.2	3.7	3.7	2.2	–	2.4	–	–	–	–	24.0
Opinion Poll/Action24	13–15 Dec 2023	1,004	38.6	13.4	15.5	9.2	2.7	6.7	3.5	2.6	2.3	–	2.6	–	–	–	–	23.1
GPO/Parapolitika	5–7 Dec 2023	1,000	41.2	11.3	14.0	10.3	3.7	6.2	3.1	3.2	1.7	–	2.9	–	–	–	–	27.2
Interview/Politic	4–8 Dec 2023	2,356	35.4	14.8	14.2	7.6	2.3	7.4	4.5	3.5	–	–	2.8	–	–	–	–	20.6
MRB/Open	27 Nov–6 Dec 2023	2,000	38.8	13.0	14.6	9.7	3.6	6.0	3.2	3.9	2.6	–	2.5	–	–	–	–	24.2
Real Polls/Documento	27–29 Nov 2023	1,772	37.4	14.7	12.8	10.8	3.4	5.5	3.2	3.1	1.7	–	3.2	–	–	–	–	22.7
Metron Analysis/Mega	22–28 Nov 2023	1,303	38.2	12.7	15.3	11.5	3.8	5.7	3.3	3.4	2.8	–	–	–	–	–	–	22.9
Pulse RC/Skai	19–21 Nov 2023	1,112	38.0	14.5	15.0	10.5	3.5	5.5	3.0	3.0	3.5	–	–	–	–	–	–	23.0
Prorata/Αttica	15–20 Nov 2023	1,000	41.7	12.9	14.7	12.9	3.1	4.9	3.1	4.3	2.5	–	–	–	–	–	–	27.0
Marc/Proto Thema	13–16 Nov 2023	1,081	39.0	13.8	14.3	9.6	3.4	5.6	2.9	3.3	3.2	–	–	–	–	–	–	24.7
GPO/Parapolitika	13–15 Nov 2023	1,200	41.8	12.8	14.0	10.3	4.2	6.3	3.3	3.6	1.4	–	–	–	–	–	–	27.8
Opinion Poll/Action24	13–15 Nov 2023	1,011	38.5	14.7	16.0	10.6	3.0	6.3	3.9	2.5	2.4	–	–	–	–	–	–	22.5
Alco/Alpha	30 Oct–3 Nov 2023	1,000	38.8	15.4	14.5	9.8	3.0	5.9	3.6	3.0	2.1	–	–	–	–	–	–	23.4
MRB/Open	30 Oct–1 Nov 2023	1,000	38.0	15.2	13.9	9.6	2.5	7.7	3.4	3.8	3.2	–	–	–	–	–	–	22.8
Pulse RC/Skai	26–30 Oct 2023	1,163	38.5	17.0	13.5	9.5	3.5	5.5	3.5	3.0	3.0	–	–	–	–	–	–	21.5
GPO/Star	23–24 Oct 2023	1,110	41.6	14.7	13.5	9.7	4.0	6.1	2.8	2.6	–	–	–	–	–	–	–	26.9
Metron Analysis/Mega	18–24 Oct 2023	1,301	38.0	15.2	13.4	10.2	2.6	6.9	3.2	3.7	3.5	–	–	–	–	–	–	22.8
Prorata/Attica	27 Sep–2 Oct 2023	1,000	38.5	17.3	12.8	10.6	3.9	6.7	3.4	2.2	–	–	–	–	–	–	–	21.2
MRB/Open	25–28 Sep 2023	1,000	38.0	17.3	12.1	9.0	3.3	7.3	3.9	2.9	2.8	–	–	–	–	–	–	20.7
Alco/Alpha	25–28 Sep 2023	1,058	37.2	17.6	13.6	8.9	5.2	5.8	2.9	3.1	2.2	–	–	–	–	–	–	19.6
Pulse RC/Skai	25–27 Sep 2023	1,142	38.0	19.0	12.0	9.0	4.0	6.0	3.0	3.0	2.0	–	–	–	–	–	–	19.0
Metron Analysis/Mega	21–26 Sep 2023	1,300	36.4	16.8	12.5	9.5	3.9	7.5	4.4	3.1	2.4	–	–	–	–	–	–	19.6
Opinion Poll/Action24	21–26 Sep 2023	1,005	39.1	17.3	12.3	9.5	3.6	5.9	4.6	3.4	–	–	–	–	–	–	–	21.8
June 2023 parliamentary election	25 June 2023	—N/a	40.6; 158	17.8; 47	11.8; 32	7.7; 21	4.7; 12	4.4; 12	3.7; 10	3.2; 8	2.5; 0	0.4; 0	–	–	–	–	–	22.8

=== Scenario polls ===
==== Maria Karystianou movement and Tsipras new party ====
Polling firm/commissioner	Fieldwork date	Sample size	ND	SYRIZA	PASOK	KKE	SP	EL	NIKI	PE	M25	FL	NA	DPK	Tsipras	Karystianou	Lead
Interview/Political	9–12 Jan 2026	1,709	26.0	2.5	11.4	6.0	–	5.4	1.5	4.9	3.1	3.5	1.1	2.7	10.9	15.8	10.2

== Polling aggregations ==
The following table displays the most recent aggregations of polling results from different organisations.

Polling Aggregator/Link	Last Update	ND	SYRIZA	PASOK	KKE	EL	NIKI	PE	Μ25	FL	NA	SE	DPK	ELPIDA	ELAS	Lead
Dimoskopiseis	20 Nov 2026	29.9; 120	1.9; 0	13.0; 39	6.8; 20	6.9; 21	1.2; 0	5.1; 15	2.9; 0	4.0; 12	–	3.9; 12	–	4.2; 13	15.9; 48	14.0
KalpiCast	21 Nov 2026	28.7; 116	2.4; 0	12.5; 39	6.8; 21	7.2; 22	1.4; 0	5.4; 17	2.8; 0	3.7; 12	–	3.8; 12	–	4.4; 14	15.4; 47	13.3
Politico	14 Nov 2026	30; 118	2; 0	13; 38	6; 18	7; 20	1; 0	5; 14	3; 9	4; 12	–	4; 12	–	4; 12	16; 47	14
PolitPro	19 Nov 2026	29.6; 118	1.6; 0	12.9; 38	6.6; 20	6.9; 20	1.2; 0	4.9; 15	3.0; 9	3.8; 11	–	4.1; 12	1.4; 0	4.3; 13	15.9; 44	13.7
Europe Elects	23 Oct 2026	29.8; 120	2.0; 0	13.2; 40	7.2; 22	6.9; 21	1.5; 0	5.0; 15	2.8; 0	3.9; 12	0.6; 0	3.5; 11	1.4; 0	3.6; 11	15.9; 48	13.9
