= 2025 Greek presidential election =

- 25 January – 12 February 2025

300 members of the Hellenic Parliament First round: 200 votes needed to win Fourth round: 151 votes needed to win
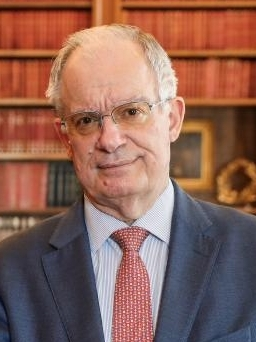

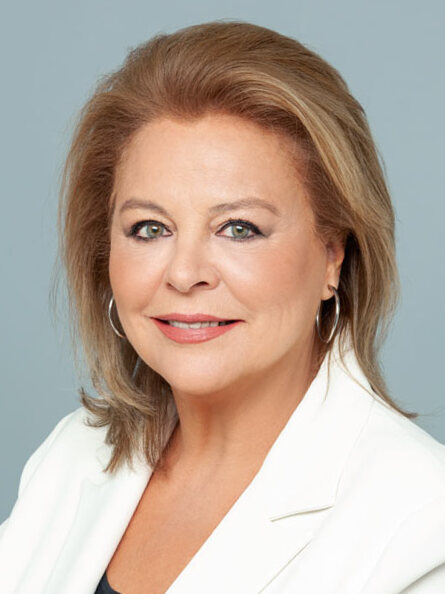

Nominee	Konstantinos Tasoulas	Tasos Giannitsis
Party	New Democracy	PASOK–KINAL
First round	160	34
Final round	160	34
Nominee	Louka Katseli	Konstantinos Kyriakou
Party	Syriza	NIKI
First round	40	14
Final round	29	14
President before election
Katerina Sakellaropoulou
Independent
President after election
Konstantinos Tasoulas
New Democracy

Indirect presidential elections were held in Greece beginning on 25 January 2025 for the president of the Hellenic Republic. A second round was held on 31 January 2025 after no candidate won a majority in the Hellenic Parliament, with the same result as in the first. A third round of voting was held on 6 February 2025, where no candidate reached the reduced required majority of 180. The fourth round was held on 12 February 2025, where Konstantinos Tasoulas was elected as President of Greece.

== Constitutional provisions ==
According to Article 32 of the Constitution of Greece, the president is elected for a five-year term by the Hellenic Parliament in a special session at least a month before the incumbent's term expires. The first and second rounds require a supermajority of 200 out of the 300-strong body, dropping to 180 on the third and 151 on the fourth. A fifth and last round would be contested between the two candidates with the most votes and decided by a relative majority.

Historically, the presidential election process required the parliament to be dissolved and a snap election called within ten days in the event of a non-election even after the third ballot, with the new parliament continuing the presidential election by holding a maximum of three further rounds of voting. This requirement was abolished by a constitutional amendment in November 2019.

== Candidates ==
=== Christos Rammos ===
On 4 December 2024, the New Left party proposed that the various left-wing parties rally behind the candidacy of the chairman of the Communications Privacy Authority (ADAE), Christos Rammos. The Communist Party of Greece nevertheless refused to support this proposal, recalling its opposition to the existence of the presidential institution. He himself refused the nomination.

=== Katerina Sakellaropoulou ===
In accordance with the provisions of the Constitution, the outgoing President Katerina Sakellaropoulou is eligible for a second five-year term. She has nonetheless been the subject of much criticism, notably both for her alleged inaction on the violations of the rule of law for which the conservative government has been criticized, and her progressive stances on issues like LGBT and refugee rights, by opposite sides of the political aisle. Moreover, during her five-year term, the presidential office suffered an unprecedented loss of popularity.

=== Konstantinos Kyriakou ===
On 13 January 2025, in an interview on a radio station, the chairman of the party Niki, Dimitris Natsios, announced his proposal to nominate as a candidate Konstantinos Kyriakou, a Greek minority member of Albania and a member of the party, who was imprisoned during the days of Albania's socialist regime in the 1970s.

=== Konstantinos Tasoulas ===
On 15 January 2025, Prime Minister Kyriakos Mitsotakis, in a televised message, announced his intention to nominate the Speaker of the Parliament, Konstantinos Tasoulas, as a presidential candidate.

=== Louka Katseli ===
On 13 January 2025, the economist, university professor and former PASOK minister, Louka Katseli, was proposed as a candidate by the president of SYRIZA-P.S., Sokratis Famellos, as "a personality who can unite Greek women and Greek men as a common candidacy of the progressive parties of our country".

=== Tassos Giannitsis ===
Former multiple PASOK minister, academic and business executive Tassos Giannitsis was proposed by the PASOK–KINAL alliance.

=== Nikos Konstantopoulos ===
Zoe Konstantopoulou, president of the Course of Freedom party, proposed as a candidate, her father, Nikos Konstantopoulos, former Synaspismos and SYRIZA president from 1993 to 2004, without informing him beforehand.

=== Other potential candidates ===
Against this backdrop, many within the ND party called for another candidate to be put forward by the Prime Minister for this presidential election, with some party deputies going so far as to call for the appointment of a political figure chosen from the right. In this case, the names of former prime ministers Kostas Karamanlis, Panayiotis Pikrammenos, and Antonis Samaras, as well as parliamentary speaker Konstantinos Tasoulas, were mentioned. The possibility of a candidacy by the Minister of Culture, Lina Mendoni, is also being put forward within the ranks of the parliamentary majority.

== Results ==
Parliament failed to elect a president in the first round of voting held on 25 January. Konstantinos Tasoulas received 160 votes (200 needed), Louka Katseli 40, Tassos Giannitsis 34, and Konstantinos Kyriakou 14. Since no candidate won a majority in Parliament, another round of voting was held on 31 January. In the second round, the members voted in the same division as the first round, with 52 other members abstaining from the vote. The third round, which saw the required majority lowered to 180, was held on 6 February, which again saw little change in the voting totals. A final round took place on 12 February. In this round, the required majority was reduced to 151 votes. Konstantinos Tasoulas got 160 votes, thus winning the election and becoming president-elect.

Candidate	Nominated by	First round		Second round		Third round		Fourth round	
Candidate	Nominated by	Votes	%	Votes	%	Votes	%	Votes	%
Konstantinos Tasoulas	New Democracy	160	53.87	160	53.33	156	53.24	160	57.97
Tassos Giannitsis	PASOK–KINAL	34	11.45	34	11.33	31	10.58	34	12.32
Louka Katseli	Syriza	40	13.47	40	13.33	40	13.65	29	10.51
Konstantinos Kyriakou	Niki	14	4.71	14	4.67	14	4.78	14	5.07
Total minimum		200		200		180		151	
Valid votes		248	83.50	248	82.67	241	82.25	237	85.87
Abstentions		49	16.50	52	17.33	52	17.75	39	14.13
Voters		297	100	300	100	293	100	276	100
Absentees		3	1.00	0	0	7	2.33	24	8.00
Total		300	99.00	300	100	300	97.67	300	92.00
