= Natsios =

Natsios is a surname. Notable people with the surname include:

- Andrew Natsios (born 1949), American politician
- Dimitris Natsios (born 1965), Greek politician
