= Tasos Giannitsis =

Greek politician, academic, and business executive

Tasos Giannitsis (Greek: Τάσος Γιαννίτσης, born 1944), is a Greek politician, academic and business executive.

== Biography ==
Born in Athens, Greece in 1944, Tasos Giannitsis graduated from the German School of Athens. He studied Law and Economics-Political Sciences at the National and Kapodistrian University of Athens, and then in 1974 he obtained a Doctorate in Economics from the University of Berlin.

He served as adviser to the Hellenic Bank Association, the Ministry of National Economy (Greece) and various other businesses. He was member of the Economic Committee of the OECD (1993-2000) and Financial Advisor to the Prime Minister of Greece in the period 1994-2000. He was Minister for Labor and Social Insurance (Greece) (2000-2001), Deputy Minister for Foreign Affairs (2001-2004) and Minister for Foreign Affairs of Greece (2004). He is a professor at the Economic Department of the University of Athens.

In December 2009, he resigned from the Board of Directors of Lambrakis Press to take over as Chairman of the BoD in Hellenic Petroleum. On November 11, 2011, he took over as the Minister of the Interior (Greece) of the Loukas Papademos government.

In March 2015 he was appointed Chairman of the BoD of LAMDA Development Company.

In January 2025 he was proposed as a candidate for the Greek Presidency in the 2025 Greek presidential election with the support of PASOK.

== Sources ==
- Short Biography of Tasos Giannitsis at express.gr (Σύντομο βιογραφικό του Τάσου Γιαννίτση στο express.gr)
