= Greek Left Alliance =

Political party in Greece

Greek Left Alliance Ελληνική Αριστερή Συμπαράταξη
- Abbreviation: EL.A.S.
- President: Alexis Tsipras
- Founder: Alexis Tsipras
- Founded: 26 May 2026
- Split from: Syriza
- Ideology: Social democracy Progressivism
- Political position: Centre-left to Left-wing
- Colors: Crimson; Blue

Party flag
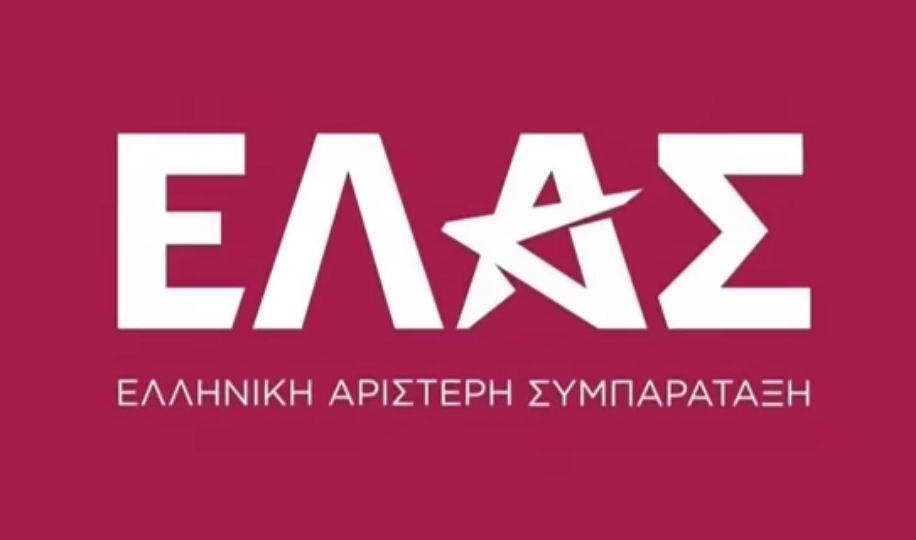

Website
- myelas.gr

The Greek Left Alliance (Note: Also referred to as the Hellenic Left Alliance or the Greek Left Coalition) (Greek: Ελληνική Αριστερή Συμπαράταξη, romanized: Ellinikí Aristerí Symparátaxi; Greek: ΕΛ.Α.Σ., romanized: EL.A.S.) is a Greek political party founded in 2026 by former Syriza leader and former Prime Minister Alexis Tsipras.

== History ==
Tsipras was Prime Minister of Greece from 2015 to 2019. Following Syriza's loss in the 2019 Greek parliamentary election, Tsipras resigned as prime minister and in October 2025 resigned as member of Parliament. On 26 May 2026, the Greek Left Alliance was launched, with Tsipras pledging to restore the rule of law and institutional independence amidst widespread mistrust of the government of Kyriakos Mitsotakis. In his speech outlining the new coalition, he said that it aims to address corruption in Greece and various scandals since Mitsotakis took office.

On 6 June, Syriza's central committee voted to ally with ELAS, although ELAS subsequently announced on 9 July that they would not cooperate with Syriza. On 17 June, Louka Katseli, Syriza's candidate in the 2025 Greek presidential election, called on ELAS to collaborate with PASOK – Movement for Change.

In October, Tsipras announced that ELAS's inaugural "programmatic conference" would be held in January 2027. Tsipras also dismissed running on a unified list with PASOK, and that MPs who leave Syriza to join ELAS were not guaranteed to be selected as candidates in the Next Greek parliamentary election, and that elected MPs should not switch parties without first resigning their seat.

== Ideology ==
According to Tsipras, the Greek Left Alliance is built on "great progressive political and national traditions", and is "a coalition of the three historic movements of progressive politics that are an expression of the modern left: the radical left, social democracy and political ecology." Greek patriotism is a central element of the party's rhetoric. In September 2025, Tsipras emphasized the need for a "new patriotism". During the presentation of the founding declaration, Tsipras emphasized that the party's colors represent the blue of the homeland and the red of social demands. He revealed the colors using a football with the colors and symbol of FC Barcelona. This "new patriotism" is expressed through demands for social justice, a patriotic tax on very high incomes, and a strong foreign policy.

== Party leaders ==
#	Leader	Portrait	Term of office		Prime Minister
1	Alexis Tsipras		26 May 2026	Incumbent	-

== See also ==
- Renewing Communist Ecological Left
- Synaspismos
