= National Rally – Patriotic Radical Momentum of Victory =

National Rally – Patriotic Radical Momentum of Victory Εθνική Συσπείρωση – Πατριωτική Ριζοσπαστική Ορμή Νίκης
- Abbreviation: National Rally – PARON
- President: Michalis Gavgiotakis
- Vice President: Giorgos Aspiotis
- Founders: Michalis Gavgiotakis; Giorgos Aspiotis
- Founded: 17 July 2024
- Split from: Spartans
- Headquarters: Gazi, Heraklion, Crete
- Ideology: Greek nationalism; National conservatism
- Political position: Right-wing to far-right
- Colours: Blue; Yellow
- Hellenic Parliament: 2 / 300 (Note: The party does not have a parliamentary group. The number of MPs refers to independent MPs who have joined the party.)
- European Parliament: 0 / 21

Website
- toparon.gr

The National Rally – Patriotic Radical Momentum of Victory (Greek: Εθνική Συσπείρωση – Πατριωτική Ριζοσπαστική Ορμή Νίκης, romanized: Ethnikí Syspeírosi – Patriotikí Rizospastikí Ormí Níkis; Abbr. National Rally – PARON or just PARON) is a Greek political party established on 17 July 2024 by two independent Members of the Hellenic Parliament who previously left the Spartans party. The party's president is the MP for Heraklion constituency, Michalis Gavgiotakis.

== History ==
=== Background ===
In the June 2023 Greek parliamentary election, the Spartans entered parliament with 4.68% of the vote and elected 12 MPs, including Giorgos Aspiotis (for Achaea), and Michalis Gavgiotakis (for Heraklion). A year later, on 25 June 2024, the two MPs left the party, continuing as independent MPs.

=== Establishment ===
On 17 July 2024, Gavgiotakis announced the creation of the party at a meeting in Gazi Heraklion, where among those present were former members of the Independent Greeks, the Union of Centrists, Spartans, etc. The new party defined itself as part of a "national and patriotic space," speaking of "a new social contract that will restore social mobility and social dignity to all Greeks." A second independent MP Giorgos Aspiotis (for Achaea) was appointed vice-president of the party, and an administrative committee consisting of nine executives was also established. Subsequently, Gavgiotakis notified the presidium of the Parliament by letter of the establishment of the party to which he and Aspiotis belonged.

Both Gavgiotakis and Aspiotis voted in favor of the government's 2025 budget.

== Affiliated Members of Parliament ==
The National Rally – PARON does not have a parliamentary group, as it has fewer than 10 MPs, which is required to form a parliamentary group. However, 2 independent MPs belong to the party: Gavgiotakis and Aspiotis, both elected on a Spartans list in June 2023 election.
