= Hope for Democracy =

Hope for Democracy (ELPIDA) Ελπίδα για την Δημοκρατία
- Abbreviation: ELPIDA
- Founders: Maria Karystianou
- Founded: 21 May 2026
- Ideology: Justice reform Anti-corruption; Social justice
- Political position: Big tent
- Colours: Gold; Blue; Olive

Website
- xekiname.gr

Hope for Democracy – Maria Karystianou, Independent Citizens’ Movement (Greek: Ελπίδα για την Δημοκρατία – Μαρία Καρυστιανού, Ανεξάρτητο Κίνημα Πολιτών), styled as "ELPIDA", is a political movement in Greece, founded by paediatrician Maria Karystianou. The movement presents itself as big-tent, with its main pillars being the pursuit of justice and anti-corruption.

Maria Karystianou became a central figure in the Tempi case as the former president of the victims’ association and as a symbol of the demonstrations and popular demand for justice. She later resigned from the association in order to enter politics and establish the political organization.

== Foundation ==
The movement was officially presented on 21 May 2026, at the "Olympion" cinema-theatre on Aristotelous Square in Thessaloniki. The symbols of the political organization are a dove and an olive branch, while its colours are gold and blue.

During the presentation, Karystianou stated that the movement expresses the demand of society in response to the degradation of the country. In another part of her speech, she said that she does not ask for faith in "saviours", but in the power of citizens. She linked the creation of the organization to the Tempi case, arguing that the tragedy exposed chronic pathologies, issues of opacity, lack of accountability, and the need to restore trust in institutions.

Several well-known figures in Greece participated in the presentation of the declaration. Journalist Thanasis Avgerinos served as presenter, while actress and former candidate with the EPAM Katerina Moutsatsou also had a central role. Also present were Vasilis Kokotsakis, technical adviser to relatives of the Tempi victims; Maria Negreponti Delivani, former rector of the University of Macedonia; and international relations expert Stavros Kalenteridis.

In its founding declaration, the movement is described as a citizens’ initiative with diverse political and social backgrounds, born from the heart of society, and seeking to operate as a political organization with movement-like characteristics and a reference to the grassroots base.

== Political positions ==
In its founding declaration, the movement sets as its basic goals the establishment of popular sovereignty, equality before the law, meritocracy and justice, as well as the restoration of the functioning of institutions. A central position of the movement is the strengthening of the rule of law, with emphasis on the independence of the judiciary, separation of powers, accountability, and the end of the appointment of the leadership of the judiciary by the executive branch.

The movement emphasizes tackling high prices and cartels, controlling monopolies and oligopolies, and strengthening healthy competition. In economic policy, the movement calls for oversight of public contracts, the management of domestic and European funds, and the use of public money. It also supports the productive and industrial reconstruction of the economy, the strengthening of small and medium-sized enterprises, innovation and digital transition, and the protection of labour rights. The declaration also includes positions on transparency in the operation of banks and their taxation, protection of primary residences, and oversight of the owners of "red" loans, namely funds, as well as the companies that have undertaken their management, namely servicers.

In the health sector, it supports the clean-up and reconstruction of the National Health System, with a public, free and universal character, as well as support for doctors, nurses and healthcare personnel.

In foreign policy, the movement states that it supports the defence of national sovereignty, sovereign rights, national interests and the territorial integrity of the country on the basis of international law. The declaration refers to conducting foreign policy on the basis of the modern multipolar world, strengthening defence and the domestic defence industry, and caring for the Greek diaspora. Various sources have aligned the party with the label of "Russophilia", mainly because of opinions expressed by some members of the party.

In the social sector, the movement supports measures to assist families, young people and vulnerable groups, as well as policies to address the demographic problem and brain drain. It also proposes reconstruction of the public education system, strengthening special education, and supporting education professionals.

In the primary and secondary sectors, ELPIDA supports — according to its declaration — a national development strategy, support for agriculture, livestock farming, fishing, beekeeping, forestry and exports. On environmental issues, the declaration refers to the protection of natural wealth, the rational utilization of natural resources, the restoration of Natura areas, the protection of forests and mountain ranges, and the re-examination of the regulatory framework for renewable energy sources.

Other positions of the movement concern strengthening press freedom and establishing transparent rules for state funding of the media, supporting culture and ancient Greek literature, strengthening sports and Paralympic sports, and measures for decentralization and the revitalization of the Greek countryside.
