= Niki (Greek political party) =

Political party in Greece

Democratic Patriotic Popular Movement "Niki" Δημοκρατικό Πατριωτικό Λαϊκό Κίνημα «Νίκη»
- Abbreviation: NIKI (Victory)
- Leader: Dimitris Natsios
- Founder: Dimitris Natsios
- Founded: 17 June 2019; 7 years ago
- Headquarters: Thessaloniki
- Youth wing: NIKI Youth
- Ideology: Ultraconservatism; National conservatism
- Political position: Far-right
- Religion: Greek Orthodox Church
- European Parliament group: Non-Inscrits
- Colours: Purple red Light blue
- Parliament: 8 / 300
- European Parliament: 1 / 21

Website
- nikh.gr

The Democratic Patriotic Popular Movement "Niki" (Greek: Δημοκρατικό Πατριωτικό Λαϊκό Κίνημα «Νίκη», romanized: Dimokratikó Patriotikó Laikó Kínima “Níki”), often shortened to simply Niki (lit. 'Victory'), is a far-right political party in Greece. It was founded by educator Dimitris Natsios in 2019. In the parliamentary elections of June 2023, the party received a percentage of 3.70%, electing 10 deputies to the Hellenic Parliament in which today, it forms the 7th Parliamentary Group.

Its main programmatic positions are defined as, "Faith, Fatherland, Family", the radical restructuring of education in Greek schools, changing Greek nationality law in regards to immigrants and refugees and the adoption of measures to solve the demographic problem, such as supporting large families and the traditional family. The party is supportive of the Greek Orthodox Church and has been described as "ultra-religious".

== History ==
The party was founded by the public education teacher and theologian Dimitris Natsios on 17 June 2019 in Thessaloniki, after the signing of the Prespa Agreement and one month before the 2019 parliamentary elections, in which he did not participate. He emerged in the polls shortly before the May 2023 elections. In that election, the first in which it participated, it garnered 2.92% of the vote and remained out of Parliament. In the June elections, it achieved 3.7% and secured 10 seats. He gathered the largest percentages in Northern Greece and specifically in Macedonia.

In the European elections of June 2024 it gathered a percentage of 4.42% and elected an MEP, Nikos Anadiotis, to the European Parliament.

In November 2024, the first congress of Niki was held in Thessaloniki, where the updated party statute was approved, and the party’s governing bodies were elected.

In 2025, during the election process for the President of the Hellenic Republic, Niki nominated Kostas Kyriakou, a Northern Epirote political prisoner under the Hoxha regime, as well as a lawyer and writer. He ranked fourth.

=== 2025 crisis and resignations ===
The transition to the new organizational model and the holding of Niki's first Congress triggered intense internal turmoil, which culminated in May 2025 with the mass resignation of officials. In early May 2025, MP Nikos Papadopoulos was expelled from the parliamentary group, in the aftermath of his unruly beheavior in the National Gallery.

On May 24, 2025, a group of 45 officials and politicians sent a joint letter of resignation, accusing the party’s president, Dimitris Natsios, and the leadership team for ideological deviation, centralization, and a lack of internal party democracy.

Among the signatories of the letter were party officials, local leaders, and Nikos Papadopoulos, an independent (former NIKI) MP, who had previously been expelled from the parliamentary caucus. In their resignation letter, the officials accused the leadership of conducting pre-convention procedures under false pretenses, rigging the elections to select delegates, and replacing “undesirable” individuals in the Local Communities. At the same time, they criticized the procedure followed at the Congress, arguing that the adoption of the Statute preceded the consultation process, while they raised objections to the fact that members of the new Voulefthirion had taken up paid positions (as appointees or research associates in the Parliament), creating a conflict of interest; allegations were also made regarding a lack of transparency in the party’s financial management and the "criminalization of free speech" within the party.

For its part, the Voulefthirion issued an official response, rejecting all of the allegations and referring to a “plan to split the party” and the pursuit of extra-institutional political agendas. The party leadership attributed the motives of those who left to personal ambitions, arguing that some of them were arbitrarily seeking paid positions, appointments to the European Parliament, or guarantees of inclusion on future electoral slates, and became disillusioned when their demands were not met.

In September 2025, Member of Parliament Nikos Vrettos was expelled for “actions that were intolerable and universally condemned by the Movement,” because he voted in favor of the government majority’s (New Democracy) proposal for the chair of the Investigative Committee looking into the OPEKEPE scandal, which was subsequently adopted. Since then, the “Niki” parliamentary group has consisted of 8 members of parliament.

== Ideology and positions ==
Niki is often described as ultraconservative and ultra-Orthodox with faith, fatherland and family as the main axes, however, the party president denies the left-right political arc, stating that they do not identify with the right, the left or the centre.

According to its statute, the party aims “to unite all Greeks who are inspired by patriotic and Orthodox sentiment for the defense of the ideals of Freedom and Independence.” Other self-referential positions include the defense of territorial integrity and national sovereignty, the restructuring of education, the support of the traditional family to address the demographic problem, and the promotion of referendums on critical issues. Additionally, the party does not accept former politicians as members, calling for those accused of mismanaging public funds and increasing national debt to be held accountable in court, with the goal of abolishing “party rule” and ensuring the independent functioning of the Executive, Legislative, and Judicial branches.

The party often refers to characteristics of the Greek nation which it promotes such as language, history and tradition, while it places special emphasis on education, criticizing certain content of school books and prejudicing the writing of new ones. It opposes sex education in schools and abortion. The party is against LGBT adoption and marriage. It states its opposition to mandatory medical procedures, such as the vaccination during the Covid-19 pandemic and questions the safety of these vaccines. The party has endorsed vaccine hesitant views during the COVID-19 pandemic.

=== Foreign policy ===
In matters of foreign policy, the party completely rejects the Prespa Agreement. It maintains a neutral attitude towards third countries, believing that the Byzantine imperial heritage, the Orthodox unifying character, can feed an international focus of stability and balance in the Balkan Peninsula.

It disagrees with Greece's support for Ukraine regarding Russia's invasion, instead preferring neutrality. The party has been referred to as "pro-Russia". Regarding Greece's relations with Turkey the party takes a hardline approach to their disputes.

During the Gaza war, the party has called for peace between the two sides and for the Greek government to advocate for the protection of Orthodox Christians affected by the conflict.

== Party structure ==
The internal structure of NIKI underwent a significant institutional transformation between its founding and its entry into Parliament, in order to comply with the constitutional requirements for the democratic functioning of political parties (Article 29 of the Constitution).

=== 2019 charter ===
The party was initially managed by two bodies. According to the 2019 statute, the main body was the Vouleftirion (Βουλευτήριον), a seven-member group ensuring that the party runs smoothly in line with its statutory principles. Voulefthrion's first five memberswere appointed by the "Founding Plenary Assembly" (which was not mentioned in the charter), while the remaining two were selected by the body’s existing members themselves; the body also had the authority to autonomously determine its own succession. Members of the Vouleftirion were independent of other organs, did not publicly represent the party, couldn't stand as candidates in any elections, and were unpaid. It was often seen as a conclave of a select few who are unaccountable to anyone, as the identities of the Vouleftirion members were not disclosed to the public, unlike the Omaikhmia, whose members were known. This lack of transparency was highlighted during the June 2023 elections when the Vouleftirion arbitrarily replaced candidates chosen by voters in the May elections with others of its own choosing.

The second body was the Omaikhmia or Homaichmía (Ομαιχμία or ὁμοαιχμία), a 28-member group that publicly represents the party's views and positions. The President of the party acted as the spokesperson for the Omaikhmia. Members were vetted by the Voulefthirion for their integrity, honesty, patriotism, and religiosity, based on criteria that prioritized “lived Orthodox faith” over educational qualifications, which were explicitly characterized as “of minor importance" in the charter.

=== 2024 charter ===
In the revised 2024 Party Charter, which was adopted by the first party Congress, the party’s structure was radically altered to more closely resemble the conventional model of parties. The Omaikhmia was completely abolished, and formal collective bodies were established, such as the Congress, the Ethics Committee, and the Financial Audit Committee. The Vouleftirion was expanded to 15 members, and its composition was now defined as public and elected by the movement’s regular Congress through a plenary vote (requiring an absolute majority of 50% + 1 of the delegates). Finally, the organization took on a more technocratic character, with members of the Council assuming specific administrative areas of responsibility (Sectors), while the Thematic Groups, responsible for policy development, were expanded to cover all areas of public administration and the economy.

== Election results ==
=== Hellenic Parliament ===
Election	Hellenic Parliament					Rank	Government
Election	Votes	%	±pp	Seats won		Rank	Government
May 2023	172,208	2.92%	New	0 / 300	New	6th	Extra-parliamentary
Jun 2023	192,239	3.69%	+0.77	10 / 300	▲10	7th	Opposition

=== European Parliament ===
European Parliament
Election	Votes	%	±pp	Seats won	+/−	Rank	Leader	EP Group
2024	174,574	4.37%	New	1 / 21	New	6th	Dimitris Natsios	NI

== Parliamentary Groups ==
=== Hellenic Parliament ===
==== 20th Parliamentary Period ====
After the June 2023 Greek legislative election, Niki elected 10 Members of the Parliament. The Parliamentary Group consists of the following MPs:

- State MP: Athanasios Rakovalis
- Athens B1: Aspasia Kouroupaki
- Athens B2: Andreas Voryllas
- Athens B3: Nikos Vrettos
- East Attica: Tassos Iconomopoulos
- Achaea: Spyros Tsironis
- Thessaloniki A: Dimitris Natsios
- Thessaloniki B: Nikos Papadopoulos
- Larissa (constituency): Giorgos Rountas
- Pieria (constituency): Komninos Delveroudis

=== European Parliament ===
==== 10th European Parliament ====
After the European Elections 2024, Niki elected one MEP.

- Nikos Anadiotis

== Notes ==
^a Omaichmia is an ancient Greek word means union for battle, defensive alliance, league. ^b senate
