= Dimitris Natsios =

Greek politician

- Δημήτρης Νατσιός

President of Democratic Patriotic Movement – Victory
- Incumbent
- Assumed office 17 June 2019
- Preceded by: Party established

Personal details
- Born: 1965 (age 60–61) Moschochori, Pieria, Greece
- Party: Democratic Patriotic Movement – Victory

Dimitris Natsios (Greek: Δημήτρης Νατσιός; born 1965) is a Greek politician and educator with a degree in Pedagogy and Theology. In 2019 he founded the Democratic Patriotic Movement – Victory, assuming the presidency of the party.

== Biography ==
Dimitris Natsios was born into a large family. He is married and the father of three children. He studied pedagogy on the Pedagogical Academy of Thessaloniki and then theology at the school of theology of the Aristotle University of Thessaloniki. He is working as a primary education teacher for the last 35 years in schools in Cyclades and Kilkis. He is a columnist on issues of education, of political, social and theological content in newspapers, magazines and websites, while according to his biography he has published 12 books mainly on education issues. Additionally he worked for 10 years as a presenter on the ecclesiastical TV station 4E TV, and for 2 years on the regional TV station of Central Macedonia, "Dion TV".

== Political career ==
He started his political activity in 2014 with the "Freedom" movement, whose founding declaration he signed. In 2015 he joined the "Radical National Rally" of Vasilis Kapernaros, participating in the party's executive committee. Later he joined the party Society – Political Party of the Successors of Kapodistrias, from which he resigned in 2016, following rumors of his founding a new political party.

On 17 June 2019, reacting to the Prespa Agreement, he founded the Democratic Patriotic Movement – Victory. In the May 2023 Greek legislative election, the first time it took part on national elections, the party received a percentage of 2.92% of the popular vote, narrowly missing entrance to the Hellenic Parliament. A month later, in the election of June the party gathered 3.7% and elected 10 MPs. In the 2024 EU elections his party raised its percentages and managed to elect 1 MEP.

Order of precedence
Preceded by Alexis Haritsis as President of New Left	Order of precedence of Greece; President of Democratic Patriotic Movement – Victory	Succeeded by Zoe Konstantopoulou as President of the Course of Freedom
