= List of members of the European Parliament for Greece, 1994–1999 =

Members of the European Parliament for Greece
Delegation	(1981)
1st term	(1981)
2nd term	(1984)
3rd term	(1989)
4th term	(1994)
5th term	(1999)
6th term	(2004)
7th term	(2009)
8th term	(2014)
9th term	(2019)
10th term	(2024)

This is a list of the 25 members of the European Parliament for Greece in the 1994 to 1999 session. See 1994 European Parliament election in Greece for the election results.

== List ==
Name	National party	EP Group
Alekos Alavanos	Coalition of the Left and Progress	EUL (1994–1995) / EUL–NGL
Mihalis Papagiannakis	Coalition of the Left and Progress	EUL (1994–1995) / EUL–NGL
Vassilis Ephremidis	Communist Party	EUL (1994–1995) / EUL–NGL
Giannis Theonas	Communist Party	EUL (1994–1995) / EUL–NGL
Katerina Daskalaki	Political Spring	EDA
Nikitas Kaklamanis	Political Spring	EDA
Georgios Anastassopoulos	New Democracy	EPP
Stelios Argyros	New Democracy	EPP
Efthymios Christodoulou	New Democracy	EPP
Kostis Chatzidakis	New Democracy	EPP
Giorgos Dimitrakopoulos	New Democracy	EPP
Panagiotis Labrias	New Democracy	EPP
Nana Mouskouri	New Democracy	EPP
Pavlos Sarlis	New Democracy	EPP
Antonis Trakatellis	New Democracy	EPP
Paraskevas Avgerinos	Socialist Movement	SOC
Giorgos Katiforis	Socialist Movement	SOC
Kostas Klironomos	Socialist Movement	SOC
Angela Kokkola	Socialist Movement	SOC
Eirini Lampraki	Socialist Movement	SOC
Nikos Papakyriazis	Socialist Movement	SOC
Christos Papoutsis	Socialist Movement	SOC
Stelios Panagopoulos	Socialist Movement	SOC
Giannis Roubatis	Socialist Movement	SOC
Dimitris Tsatsos	Socialist Movement	SOC
