= List of members of the European Parliament for Greece, 2019–2024 =

This is a list of the 21 members of the European Parliament for the Greece in the 2019 to 2024 session.

Members of the European Parliament for Greece
Delegation	(1981)
1st term	(1981)
2nd term	(1984)
3rd term	(1989)
4th term	(1994)
5th term	(1999)
6th term	(2004)
7th term	(2009)
8th term	(2014)
9th term	(2019)
10th term	(2024)

These MEPs were elected at the 2019 European Parliament election in the Greece.

== List ==
On the New Democracy list: (EPP Group)

1. Stelios Kympouropoulos
2. Vangelis Meimarakis
3. Maria Spyraki
4. Eliza Vozemberg
5. Manolis Kefalogiannis
6. Anna Asimakopoulou
7. Giorgos Kyrtsos (left the party on 18 February 2022, now Renew Europe)
8. Theodoros Zagorakis

On the Coalition of the Radical Left list: (GUE–NGL)

1. Dimitrios Papadimoulis (left the party on 23 November 2023, co-founded New Left)
2. Elena Kountoura
3. Kostas Arvanitis
4. Stelios Kouloglou (left the party on 23 October 2023)
5. Alexis Georgoulis (left the party and group on 17 April 2023, now independent)
6. Petros S. Kokkalis (left the party on 16 November 2023)

On the Movement for Change list: (S&D)

1. Nikos Androulakis
2. Eva Kaili (expelled from the party and group on 8 December 2022, now independent)

On the Communist Party of Greece list: (Non-Inscrits)

1. Konstantinos Papadakis
2. Lefteris Nikolaou-Alavanos

On the Golden Dawn list: (Non-Inscrits)

1. Ioannis Lagos (left the party on 13 July 2019)
2. Athanasios Konstantinou (now independent)

On the Greek Solution list: (ECR)

1. Kyriakos Velopoulos – until 7 July 2019
  Emmanouil Fragkos – since 10 July 2019

=== Replacements ===
MEP before	Replacement	Date entry	Party	Party
Kyriakos Velopoulos	Emmanouil Fragkos	7 July 2019	ECR	Greek Solution
Nikos Androulakis	Nikos Papandreou	21 May 2023	S&D	PASOK – Movement for Change

== See also ==
- List of members of the European Parliament, 2019–2024
