= List of members of the European Parliament for Greece, 1999–2004 =

Members of the European Parliament for Greece
Delegation	(1981)
1st term	(1981)
2nd term	(1984)
3rd term	(1989)
4th term	(1994)
5th term	(1999)
6th term	(2004)
7th term	(2009)
8th term	(2014)
9th term	(2019)
10th term	(2024)

This is a list of the 25 members of the European Parliament for the Greece in the 1999 to 2004 session.

== List ==
Name	National party	EP Group
Alekos Alavanos	Coalition of the Left and Progress	EUL–NGL
Konstantinos Alyssandrakis	Communist Party	EUL–NGL
Ioannis Averoff	New Democracy	EPP–ED
Emmanouil Bakopoulos	Democratic Social Movement	EUL–NGL
Alexandros Baltas	Socialist Movement	PES
Giorgos Dimitrakopoulos	New Democracy	EPP–ED
Petros Efthymiou	Socialist Movement	PES
Christos Folias	New Democracy	EPP–ED
Marietta Giannakou	New Democracy	EPP–ED
Konstantinos Hatzidakis	New Democracy	EPP–ED
Anna Karamanou	Socialist Movement	PES
Giorgos Katiforis	Socialist Movement	PES
Efstratios Korakas	Communist Party	EUL–NGL
Ioannis Koukiadis	Socialist Movement	PES
Dimitrios Koulourianos	Democratic Social Movement	EUL–NGL
Rodi Kratsa-Tsagaropoulou	New Democracy	EPP–ED
Minerva Melpomeni Malliori	Socialist Movement	PES
Ioannis Marinos	New Democracy	EPP–ED
Emmanouil Mastorakis	Socialist Movement	PES
Mihalis Papagiannakis	Coalition of the Left and Progress	EUL–NGL
Ioannis Souladakis	Socialist Movement	PES
Ioannis Theonas	Communist Party	EUL–NGL
Antonios Trakatellis	New Democracy	EPP–ED
Dimitris Tsatsos	Socialist Movement	PES
Christos Zacharakis	New Democracy	EPP–ED
Myrsini Zorba	Socialist Movement	PES
