= List of members of the European Parliament for Greece, 1981 =

Members of the European Parliament for Greece
Delegation	(1981)
1st term	(1981)
2nd term	(1984)
3rd term	(1989)
4th term	(1994)
5th term	(1999)
6th term	(2004)
7th term	(2009)
8th term	(2014)
9th term	(2019)
10th term	(2024)

This is the list of the appointed members of the European Parliament for Greece from 1 January 1981 until the (first) direct elections in October 1981. See 1981 European Parliament election in Greece for the results.

== List ==
Name	National party	EP Group
Leonidas Bournias	New Democracy	NI
Yannis Coutsocheras	Socialist Movement	SOC
Giorgos Dalakouras	New Democracy	NI
Ioannis Dimopoulos	New Democracy	NI
Assimakis Fotilas	Socialist Movement	SOC
Dimitrios Frangos	New Democracy	NI
Antonios Georgiadis	Socialist Movement	SOC
Konstantinos Gontikas	New Democracy	NI
Ioannis Haralampopoulos	Socialist Movement	SOC
Ioannis Katsafados	New Democracy	NI
Konstantinos Loules	Communist Party (Interior)	COM
Spyridon Markozanis	New Democracy	NI
Konstantinos Nikolaou	Socialist Movement	SOC
Efstratios Papaefstratiou	New Democracy	NI
Anastassios Peponis	Socialist Movement	SOC
Yiangos Pesmazoglou	Party of Democratic Socialism	NI
Spyridon Plaskovitis	Socialist Movement	SOC
Evanghelos Soussouroyannis	New Democracy	NI
Mihail Vardakas	New Democracy	NI
Thermistokles Visas	New Democracy	NI
Dimitrios Vlahopoulos	New Democracy	NI
Georgios Voyadzis	New Democracy	NI
Nikos Zardinidis	New Democracy	NI
Ioannis Zighdis	Union of the Democratic Centre	NI
