= List of members of the European Parliament for Greece, 2014–2019 =

Members of the European Parliament for Greece
Delegation	(1981)
1st term	(1981)
2nd term	(1984)
3rd term	(1989)
4th term	(1994)
5th term	(1999)
6th term	(2004)
7th term	(2009)
8th term	(2014)
9th term	(2019)
10th term	(2024)

This is a list of the 21 members of the European Parliament for the Greece in the 2014 to 2019 session, as elected on 25 May 2014 European Parliament election in Greece.

== List ==
Name	National party	EP Group
Konstantinos Chrysogonos	Coalition of the Radical Left (SYRIZA)	GUE/NGL
Manolis Glezos (until 7 July 2015); Nikolaos Chountis (from 20 July 2015)	Coalition of the Radical Left (SYRIZA); Independent (2 September 2015)	GUE/NGL
Georgios Katrougalos (until 26 January 2015); Stelios Kouloglou (from 27 January 2015)	Coalition of the Radical Left (SYRIZA)	GUE/NGL
Konstantina Kouneva	Coalition of the Radical Left (SYRIZA)	GUE/NGL
Dimitrios Papadimoulis	Coalition of the Radical Left (SYRIZA)	GUE/NGL
Sofia Sakorafa	Coalition of the Radical Left (SYRIZA); Independent (28 September 2015)	GUE/NGL
Manolis Kefalogiannis	New Democracy (ND)	EPP
Giorgos Kyrtsos	New Democracy (ND)	EPP
Maria Spyraki	New Democracy (ND)	EPP
Eliza Vozemberg	New Democracy (ND)	EPP
Theodoros Zagorakis	New Democracy (ND)	EPP
Georgios Epitidios	Golden Dawn	non-inscrits
Lambros Foundoulis	Golden Dawn	non-inscrits
Eleftherios Synadinos	Golden Dawn	non-inscrits
Nikos Androulakis	Olive Tree (Elia)	S&D
Eva Kaili	Olive Tree (Elia)	S&D
Giorgos Grammatikakis	The River (Potami)	S&D
Miltiadis Kyrkos	The River (Potami)	S&D
Konstantinos Papadakis	Communist Party of Greece (KKE)	non-inscrits
Sotirios Zarianopoulos	Communist Party of Greece (KKE)	non-inscrits
Notis Marias	Independent Greeks (ANEL); Independent (7 January 2015)	ECR
