= List of members of the European Parliament for Greece, 2024–2029 =

Members of the European Parliament for Greece
Delegation	(1981)
1st term	(1981)
2nd term	(1984)
3rd term	(1989)
4th term	(1994)
5th term	(1999)
6th term	(2004)
7th term	(2009)
8th term	(2014)
9th term	(2019)
10th term	(2024)

This is a list of the 21 members of the European Parliament for Greece in the 2024 to 2029 session. The members were elected in the 2024 European Parliament election in Greece.

== List ==
Name	National party	EP Group	Preference votes	Ref
Giorgos Aftias	New Democracy (ND)	EPP	320,176	
Vangelis Meimarakis	New Democracy (ND)	EPP	268,952	
Eliza Vozemberg	New Democracy (ND)	EPP	254,493	
Fredis Beleris	New Democracy (ND)	EPP	245,874	
Eleonora Meleti	New Democracy (ND)	EPP	178,990	
Manolis Kefalogiannis	New Democracy (ND)	EPP	168,329	
Dimitris Tsiodras	New Democracy (ND)	EPP	162,541	
Kostas Arvanitis	SYRIZA	GUE–NGL	159,786	
Nikolas Farantouris	SYRIZA	GUE–NGL	141,216	
Nikos Pappas	SYRIZA	GUE–NGL	132,024	
Elena Kountoura	SYRIZA	GUE–NGL	118,689	
Nikos Papandreou	PASOK – Movement for Change	S&D	127,633	
Giannis Maniatis	PASOK – Movement for Change	S&D	111,511	
Sakis Arnaoutoglou	PASOK – Movement for Change	S&D	94,992	
Emmanouil Fragkos	Greek Solution (EL)	ECR	114,244	
Galato Alexandraki	Greek Solution (EL)	ECR	53,045	
Lefteris Nikolaou-Alavanos	Communist Party of Greece (KKE)	Non-attached Members	112,406	
Konstantinos Papadakis	Communist Party of Greece (KKE)	Non-attached Members	110,461	
Nikos Anadiotis	Democratic Patriotic Movement (Niki)	Non-attached Members	43,369	
Maria Zacharia	Course of Freedom (PE)	Non-attached Members	23,946	
Afroditi Latinopoulou	Voice of Reason (FL)	PfE	60,745	
