= List of members of the European Parliament for Greece, 2004–2009 =

Members of the European Parliament for Greece
Delegation	(1981)
1st term	(1981)
2nd term	(1984)
3rd term	(1989)
4th term	(1994)
5th term	(1999)
6th term	(2004)
7th term	(2009)
8th term	(2014)
9th term	(2019)
10th term	(2024)

This is a list of the 24 members of the European Parliament for the Greece in the 2004 to 2009 session.

== List ==
Name	National party	EP Group
Stavros Arnaoutakis	Socialist Movement	PES
Katerina Batzeli	Socialist Movement	PES
Panagiotis Beglitis	Socialist Movement	PES
Giorgos Dimitrakopoulos	New Democracy	EPP–ED
Ioannis Gklavakis	New Democracy	EPP–ED
Konstantinos Hatzidakis	New Democracy	EPP–ED
Georgios Karatzaferis	Popular Orthodox Rally	IND&DEM
Rodi Kratsa-Tsagaropoulou	New Democracy	EPP–ED
Stavros Lambrinidis	Socialist Movement	PES
Diamanto Manolakou	Communist Party	EUL–NGL
Maria Matsouka	Socialist Movement	PES
Manolis Mavrommatis	New Democracy	EPP–ED
Thanasis Pafilis	Communist Party	EUL–NGL
Marie Panayotopoulos-Cassiotou	New Democracy	EPP–ED
Dimitrios Papadimoulis	Coalition of Left Movements and Ecology	EUL–NGL
Georgios Papastamkos	New Democracy	EPP–ED
Antonis Samaras	New Democracy	EPP–ED
Nikolaos Sifounakis	Socialist Movement	PES
Giorgos Toussas	Communist Party	EUL–NGL
Antonios Trakatellis	New Democracy	EPP–ED
Evangelia Tzampazi	Socialist Movement	PES
Nikos Vakalis	New Democracy	EPP–ED
Ioannis Varvitsiotis	New Democracy	EPP–ED
Marilisa Xenogiannakopoulou	Socialist Movement	PES
