= List of members of the European Parliament for Greece, 1989–1994 =

Members of the European Parliament for Greece
Delegation	(1981)
1st term	(1981)
2nd term	(1984)
3rd term	(1989)
4th term	(1994)
5th term	(1999)
6th term	(2004)
7th term	(2009)
8th term	(2014)
9th term	(2019)
10th term	(2024)

This is a list of members of the European Parliament for Greece in the 1989 to 1994 session. See 1989 European Parliament election in Greece for the election results.

== List ==
Name	National party	EP Group
Alexandros Alavanos	Coalition of the Left and Progress (Synaspismos)	LU
Georgios Anastassopoulos	New Democracy	EPP
Paraskevas Avgerinos	Panhellenic Socialist Movement	SOC
Efthymios Christodoulou (until 11 April 1990) Georgios Zavvos (from 25 April 1990)	New Democracy	EPP
Dimitrios Dessylas	Coalition of the Left and Progress (Synaspismos) (until 7 March 1990) New Left Current	LU
Vassilis Ephremidis	Coalition of the Left and Progress (Synaspismos) (until 18 February 1992) Communist Party of Greece	LU
Marietta Giannakou (until 11 April 1990) Menelaos Chatzigeorgiou (from 25 April 1990)	New Democracy	EPP
Jeorjos Romeos (until 13 October 1993) Emmanouil Karellis (from 21 October 1993)	Panhellenic Socialist Movement	SOC
Sotiris Kostopoulos	Panhellenic Socialist Movement	SOC
Efstathios Lagakos	New Democracy	EPP
Panayotis Lambrias	New Democracy	EPP
Dionysios Livanos (until 22 November 1993) Georgios Raftopoulos (from 25 November 1993)	Panhellenic Socialist Movement	SOC
Dimitrios Nianias	Democratic Renewal	EDA
Dimitrios Pagoropoulos	Panhellenic Socialist Movement	SOC
Mihalis Papagiannakis	Coalition of the Left and Progress (Synaspismos)	GUE (until 11 January 1993) Non-Inscrits
Christos Papoutsis	Panhellenic Socialist Movement	SOC
Yiangos Pesmazoglou	New Democracy	EPP
Filippos Pierros	New Democracy	EPP
Panayotis Roumeliotis	Panhellenic Socialist Movement	SOC
Georgios Saridakis	New Democracy	EPP
Pavlos Sarlis	New Democracy	EPP
Ioannis Stamoulis	Panhellenic Socialist Movement	SOC
Konstantinos Stavrou	New Democracy	EPP
Konstantinos Tsimas	Panhellenic Socialist Movement	SOC
