= List of members of the European Parliament for Greece, 2009–2014 =

Members of the European Parliament for Greece
Delegation	(1981)
1st term	(1981)
2nd term	(1984)
3rd term	(1989)
4th term	(1994)
5th term	(1999)
6th term	(2004)
7th term	(2009)
8th term	(2014)
9th term	(2019)
10th term	(2024)

This is a list of the 22 members of the European Parliament for the Greece in the 2009 to 2014 session.

== List ==
Name	National party	EP Group
Kriton Arsenis	Socialist Movement (2009–2013) Coalition of the Radical Left	S&D (2009–2013) EUL–NGL
Nikólaos Chountís	Coalition of the Radical Left	EUL–NGL
Marietta Giannakou	New Democracy	EPP
Marilena Koppa	Socialist Movement	S&D
Giorgos Koumoutsakos	New Democracy	EPP
Rodi Kratsa-Tsagaropoulou	New Democracy	EPP
Stavros Lambrinidis	Socialist Movement	S&D
Thanasis Pafilis	Communist Party	EUL–NGL
Chrysoula Paliadeli	Socialist Movement	S&D
Giorgos Papakonstantinou	Socialist Movement	S&D
Giorgos Papanikolaou	New Democracy	EPP
Georgios Papastamkos	New Democracy	EPP
Anni Podimata	Socialist Movement	S&D
Kostas Poupakis	New Democracy	EPP
Sylvana Rapti	Socialist Movement	S&D
Thanos Plevris	Popular Orthodox Rally	EFD
Theodoros Skylakakis	New Democracy (2009–2010); Democratic Alliance (2010–2012); Drassi	EPP (2009–2010); ALDE
Giorgos Stavrakakis	Socialist Movement	S&D
Giorgos Toussas	Communist Party	EUL–NGL
Michalis Tremopoulos	Ecologist Greens	G–EFA
Ioannis Tsoukalas	New Democracy	EPP
Niki Tzavela	Popular Orthodox Rally	EFD

== See also ==
- List of members of the European Parliament (2009–2014)
