= Elections in Greece =

At a national level, Greece holds elections (ekloges) for its legislature, the Hellenic Parliament.

== Election of the legislature ==
The Greek Parliament (Voulí ton Ellínon) has 300 members, elected for a four-year term by a system of "reinforced" proportional representation. Of the 300 seats, 285 are allocated to 59 constituencies, 50 of which are multi-seat and 9 single-seat. The remaining 15 MPs are elected from nationwide party lists, of which 3 are required to represent the Greek diaspora. Seat allocation to individual parties is done on the basis of their nationwide vote share, provided they have reached the electoral threshold of 3%. In each constituency, voters may select the candidate or candidates of their choice by marking their name on the party ballot.

In 2016, the previous parliament, under a left-wing majority, abolished the reinforced proportionality system, which had been in effect since 2004. The previous system had been boosting the first party's seat count with 50 "bonus" seats, in order to facilitate single-party absolute majorities in parliament. It was replaced by a party-list proportional representation system, under which single-party parliamentary majorities, commonly achieved by first parties under previous electoral systems, could now only be achieved with a vote share of at least 45%, effectively making coalition governments the norm. On those grounds, and arguing that proportional representation would cause political instability, the new law was strongly contested by the conservative opposition and failed to get the two thirds supermajority required by the constitution for a new electoral system to be immediately applied in the next election. Hence, the previous system was still applied in the 2019 election, which the opposition won, whereas the new system was applied in the 2023 election for the first time.

In 2020, parliament, under its new conservative majority, repealed party-list proportional representation and reverted the system to a sliding scale majority bonus system. The new system is similar to the pre-2016 reinforced majority system, with the only difference being that the size of the majority bonus is now tied to the largest party's national vote share, ranging from a minimum of 20 seats for a vote share of 25% to a maximum of 50 seats for vote shares of 40% and above; no majority bonus is awarded to the first party if its vote share is below 25%. Under normal circumstances, an absolute majority can be achieved by the first party with 38% of the vote. However, as was the case with the proportional representation system voted by the previous parliament in 2016, the two thirds supermajority required by the constitution for a new electoral system to be immediately applied in the next election (in May 2023) was not met, and, therefore, the new system only started to be applied to the next election after that, which was held a month later in June 2023.

Greek citizens aged 17 and over on the year of the election are eligible to vote, and at the age of 25 and over are also eligible to be elected to Parliament. Women's suffrage was adopted in 1952.

=== Constituencies ===
Electoral constituencies colour-coded to correspond with the number of seats in each.

Constituencies in Greece have traditionally been multi-seat, and they mostly coincide with prefectures. The number of seats is adjusted once every ten years, following the decennial population census. Prefecture constituencies may not be deprived of representation, nor may they be merged with another prefecture; they may however be split into smaller constituencies if their population increases disproportionately: this was the case with the Athens B constituency which was split into three smaller constituencies in 2019. Population changes have left nine (Kefalonia, Lefkas, Eurytania, Grevena, Samos, Thesprotia, Kastoria, Phocis and Zakynthos) prefectures with a single parliamentary seat each, whereas some urban or suburban constituencies have seen large increases in their seat allotment over the years.

Following the census of 2021, the largest constituencies can be found in the metropolitan areas of Athens and Thessaloniki. These are Athens B3 (19 seats), Thessaloniki A (17 seats), Athens B1 (16 seats), Athens A (13 seats), Athens B2 (12 seats) and East Attica (12 seats). The remaining constituencies elect single-digit numbers of MPs. The largest constituency outside Athens and Thessaloniki is Achaea, which has 9 seats.

=== Voting ===
Polling takes place in school buildings on a Sunday, a festive occasion for students who are then given a four-day weekend off. The procedure is run by a presiding judge or attorney-at-law appointed by the local bar association, and secretarially assisted by local citizens selected by lot in a process resembling jury duty. Local party representatives are allowed to monitor tallying; their theoretical role is to ensure transparency.

==== Security at polling stations ====
Nowadays, police presence varies as police officers might be allocated to stand guard at an individual polling centre or supervise -that is, to patrol the general vicinity of- more than one polling centre (especially in the countryside). Up until 1998, the responsibility of guarding polling stations was shared between the Hellenic Armed Forces and the Hellenic Police, while there was no provision for laissez faire supervision of multiple polling centres: where necessary, armed teams of conscripts and their supervisors (career NCO or officer) were to reside inside the polling stations from the day prior to the election until the day of the announcement of the results. In 1998 the provision regarding the Armed Forces was abolished, and Police presence was reduced from six-member to four-member teams.

During the 2019 European Parliament and local elections, police officers on guard received orders not to be armed only during the morning and afternoon shift of the day of the election, something in sharp contrast with past practices, while police unionists noted that the duty of guarding a polling centre should not fall on a single officer per shift. In 2021, the mention of the past presence of armed Hellenic Army soldiers in polling centres by a New Democracy MP in parliament was decried by Avgi.

=== Electoral system ===
A visual representation of the seat allocation system used in Greece.

The Greek electoral system was codified for the first time by Presidential Decree in 2012; prior to that date it was made up of various pieces of legislation passed at different times. The current system is called "reinforced proportionality" in Greece (ενισχυμένη αναλογική), and is a form of semi-proportional representation with a 50-seat majority bonus for the party that wins a plurality of the vote. There is also an electoral threshold of 3% which all parties and individuals need to pass on a national level before being awarded any seats. These provisions are aimed at helping the largest party secure an absolute majority of parliamentary seats (151 out of 300), enhancing governmental stability. The majority bonus of 50 seats was abolished in 2016, but was still applied at the 2019 Greek legislative election because the new electoral law did not receive a supermajority in Parliament, and can thus not be enforced in the next election.

The May 2023 election saw the electoral system change to a fully proportional representation system, as the majority bonus was abolished by the Syriza government in 2016. The June 2023 election reverted to semi-proportional representation with a sliding scale bonus after it was passed in parliament in 2020.

The 50-seat majority bonus system was used for the first time in the May 2012 election; it reserves 50 parliamentary seats for the party emerges as the largest by total votes cast on a national level. The remaining 250 seats are divided proportionally in parliamentary constituencies according to each party's total valid vote percentage; this is slightly higher than the raw percentage reported, as there is always a small number of invalidated or "blank" votes (usually less than 1%), as well as the percentage of smaller parties that fail to surpass the 3% threshold, all of which are disregarded for the purpose of seat allotment. The previous law (used in the 2009 legislative elections) was less favorable for the plurality party, as only 40 additional seats were reserved for them.

Articles 99 and 100 of the codified electoral law lay out the way in which parties are allocated seats in accordance with the percentage of votes they received in a legislative election. The introduction of the majority bonus makes seat allocation especially complex, but the steps followed for the allocation of seats are as follows:

- The number of seats a party is entitled to is first determined by dividing the total number of valid votes cast for parties which have surpassed the 3% national threshold and dividing it by 250 (99§2); this is later used to 'correct' the proportional results in the constituencies, ensuring that 50 seats always remain empty for the majority bonus.
- The 12 seats elected through national-wide party-list are awarded by first determining a quota by taking the total number of valid votes for parties which have surpassed the 3% electoral threshold on a national level and dividing it by 12 (100§1). The total number of valid votes cast for each party is then divided by the quota, and the sum is rounded down, disregarding decimals, to produce the number of seats the party is awarded (100§2), so that a sum of 5.6 for example awards 5 seats to that party. If any of the 12 seats left empty in this step, a seat is awarded to each party in descending order of leftover decimals until all seats have been allocated in this manner (100§3).
- The 7 seats elected through first-past-the-post in single-seat constituencies are awarded to the party which has the most votes in each of the constituencies in question, provided that that party has surpassed the 3% electoral threshold on a national level (100§5).
- The 231 seats elected proportionally in constituencies are awarded by first determining a quota by taking the total number of valid votes cast for all parties in the constituency, regardless of if they have surpassed the 3% electoral threshold on a national level, and dividing it by the total number of seats in the constituency (100§4). The total number of valid votes cast for each party is then divided by the quota, and the rounded down sum corresponds to the number of seats each party is awarded in that constituency (100§4), so that again a sum of 5.6 would be awarded 5 seats. Any party which is entitled to more seats than it had candidates on the ballot paper can only be awarded a number of seats equal to the number of candidates it fielded (100§5). Any leftover seats are then awarded by calculating the difference between the total number of seats a party has received on a national level so far and the seats a party is entitled to according to the first step (100§6). The same procedure is then followed on all constituencies except single-member ones (100§6), to determine which constituencies each party is over- or under-represented in. This sum is used to award one seat, in descending order of sums, to that party which has the highest leftover sum in each of the two-member and three-member constituencies until all seats have been awarded (100§7). If any party has been awarded more seats on a national level than it is entitled to, the extra seats are removed from three-member (or, if necessary, two-member) constituencies in which that party has the lowest leftover sums (100§7). If there are still empty seats, those constituencies are ranked in descending order by leftover sums of parties which have surpassed the 3% electoral threshold on a national level, and one seat is awarded in each constituency to the smallest party by total number of valid votes above the 3% threshold, until that party has been awarded the total number of seats it is entitled to according to the first step (100§8). If there are still seats available, the last step is followed again and seats awarded to each party in ascending order of valid votes received, until all seats have been awarded.
- The 50 seats of the majority bonus elected in constituencies are awarded after the above steps have been completed, ensuring that 50 seats remain available for the largest party (99§3a). A coalition can also be awarded the 50 seats provided that the average percentage of votes for each party in the coalition is larger than the percentage of votes received by the largest party on a national level, and in that case it is the Supreme Civil and Criminal Court of Greece that decides on whether a coalition qualifies for the allocation of the 50 seats (99§3b).

A rather complicated set of rules deals with rounding decimal results up or down, and ensures that the smaller a constituency is, the more strictly proportional its parliamentary representation will be. Another set of rules apportions the 50 seat premium for the largest-tallying party among constituencies. Individual seats are apportioned by "cross of preference". Voters mark a cross next to the name of the candidate or candidates they prefer, the number of crosses varying from one to five depending on constituency size. Ballots with no crosses or more crosses than allowed, count for only the party but not the individual candidates.

Tallying is done manually in the presence of representatives of all contesting parties. Party tallying, which is easier, is done first so that returns may be announced quickly. Individual candidate tallying is done next and can take several days. Once the number of seats per party and constituency is determined, the seats are filled on a top-down basis from the individual cross-of-preference tallies. Party heads and acting or past Prime Ministers are exempt from cross-of-preference voting: they are automatically placed at the top of their party list and are elected, provided their party achieves at least one seat in the particular constituency.

By constitutional provision, the electoral law can be changed by simple parliamentary majority, but a law so changed comes into effect in the next-but-one election, unless a two-thirds parliamentary supermajority (200 or more votes) is achieved. Only in the latter case is the new electoral law effective at the next election. A case in point is the current electoral law, which was passed in 2020. Because this law was passed by a simple majority, it was not used for the subsequent May 2023 election, but could be used in the June 2023 election.

Greek electoral laws since 1974
Law's "trademark"	Passed in	Passed by	Applied in (election year)	Approximate nationwide vote percentage needed for an absolute majority of seats in Parliament for the largest party	Threshold
Reinforced proportionality	1974	New Democracy	'74, '77, '81, '85 (the premium of seats was reduced)	in almost any case (40% and a clear advantage were necessary in '74 elections)	none for the first seat allocation (in prefectures), but 17% for the second one in peripheries (this threshold was not in force during '85 elections)
Simple proportionality	1989	Panhellenic Socialist Movement	'89 (Jun), '89 (Nov), '90	47%+	none
Reinforced proportionality	1990	New Democracy	'93, '96, '00, '04	in almost any case	3%
Reinforced proportionality	2004	Panhellenic Socialist Movement	'07, '09	41.5%+	3%
Reinforced proportionality	2008	New Democracy	'12 (May), '12 (Jun), '15 (Jan), '15 (Sep), '19	39%+	3%
Simple proportionality	2016	Syriza	'23 (May)	47%+	3%
Reinforced proportionality	2020	New Democracy	'23 (June)	39%+	3%

=== Electorate ===
All Greek citizens turning 17 or aged over 17 in the year of the election are eligible to vote, provided they are on the electoral register, unless:

- they are imprisoned for a criminal offence and they have been expressly deprived of the right to vote by judicial decision (this happens only in the rare cases of high treason or mutiny). Incarcerated persons vote in polling stations specially set up inside prisons.
- they are mentally incapable of making a reasoned judgement, according to a judicial decision. In practice, this applies only to a percentage of institutionalised mental patients.

According to Presidential Decree 26/2012 (as amended by law 4648/2019), article 4, 1 January is -for electoral purposes- considered the birthday of all citizens turning 17 in that year. As such, citizens are able to vote in elections before their actual birthday, provided that they turn 17 in the year.

The Constitution provides, following the amendment of 2001, for the right of Greek citizens living abroad to vote for the legislative elections; the law implementing this constitutional provision was passed in 2019.

==== Electoral rolls and compulsory voting ====
In the past, citizens who reached adulthood had to initiate the registration procedure and were issued an "election booklet" with which they voted. Nowadays, registration for voters is not needed as it is done automatically each year by the municipal authorities; catalogues of to-be voters (coming of age the next year) are composed during November of the previous year. They do not become part of the electoral catalogues, till January 1st. Identity is proved by state-issued ID cards or passport. Special registration is necessary only for absentee voting, which is done at the place of a voter's temporary residence on election day. Many Greeks choose to retain their voting rights in their family's original home, sometimes by reason of tradition, sometimes by reason of patronage.

Since the abolition of Electoral Booklets in 2001, each and every voter is provided with a 13-digit Special Electoral Number. This number is used solely for proving the uniqueness of the voter and excluding any possibility of double voting. Any other use of the number is deemed illegal and carries a penalty of at least a year in prison and fine from €2934.70 up to €29,347.03, unless other acts have also taken place. This number consists of:

- a four-digit code corresponding to a Municipality or Community(0101-Agia Varvara to 5410-Psara)
- the last three digits of the voter's birth year (999 for 1999, et cetera)
- a five-digit code that reflects the ranking of each new voter, in relation to his year of birth, which is unique per Municipality or Community and is allocated to the basis of first available number
- a number (or letter) in relation to the aforementioned codes used for the verification of the correct registration of all the 12-digit sequence.

The Special Electoral Number remains the same, even if the voter chooses to transfer their voting rights to another constituency.

Compulsory voting is the law (Article 51 of the Constitution) in Greece but is not enforced, given that the constitutional provision for sanctions was repealed during the Greek constitutional amendment of 2001.

Previously, the law provided for a series of sanctions for absentees:

- imprisonment for a term of one month to one year for those who failed to vote without a valid reason, including who had acquired the right to vote but had not sought to be registered on the voter rolls. Although this provision is no longer actively enforced, it remains in force (the latter part being obsolete due to automatic registration).
- prohibition on the issuance of a professional or business license, a driver’s license/prohibition of the right to drive or use a vehicle (for those with issued licenses), or a passport. This essentially made participation in the elections a legal prerequisite for any of these activities. It was repealed in the 1998 electoral reform.

Turnout at national elections is low: a mere 61.8% at the 2023 election.

=== Political culture ===
Number of political parties in the Hellenic Parliament since 1910, by election year and electoral system.

Before 1910, Greece lacked a coherent party system in accordance with the traits of the modern representative democracy. The political formations of the 19th century lacked a steady organizational structure and a clear ideological orientation. Sometimes, they constituted just the incoherent and ephemeral escort of a prominent politician.

The first Greek parties with an ideological background, conforming to the modern conception of a political party, appeared after 1910, when Eleftherios Venizelos rose to predominance in Greek political life and founded his Liberal Party. The liberal wave of Venizelism resulted soon in the reaction of the "old-system" political leaders, who formed the core of an opposing conservative movement, which used the monarchy as its main rallying banner. Thereby, the two biggest ideological movements, the republican centrist-liberal and the monarchist conservative, emerged and formed massive political organizations.

The centrist and the conservative parties bitterly confronted each other in the ensuing legislative elections for many decades, until metapolitefsi. After the metapolitefsi of 1974, the leftist-socialist movement supplanted the centrists and took the main part of their electorate. A smaller part of erstwhile centrists, along with most conservatives, affiliated themselves with the centre-right New Democracy party, which self-defined as a liberal party and drafted the republican Constitution of 1975.

Until recently, Greece has had a two-party system dominated by the liberal-conservative New Democracy (ND) and the center-left Panhellenic Socialist Movement (PASOK). Other parties won far fewer seats. Beginning in the May and June 2012 legislative elections, SYRIZA (the Coalition of the Radical Left) overtook PASOK as the main force of the left wing. After almost three years of opposition to the ND-PASOK coalition government, SYRIZA took the most votes in the January 2015 elections and formed government, while PASOK just barely crossed the threshold.

Currently, the left is represented in Parliament by the Communist Party of Greece (KKE), SYRIZA, PASOK-KINAL, Course of Freedom and the New Left. To the right of ND, lies Kyriakos Velopoulos' Greek Solution, Niki and the Spartans.

Greek parties in government since 1974
Parties	'74	'77	'81	'85	'89	'89	'90	'93	'96	'00	'04	'07	'09	'11	'12	'13	'14	'15	'15	'19	'23
New Democracy (ND)	X	X			X	X	X				X	X		X	X	X	X			X	X
Panhellenic Socialist Movement (PASOK)			X	X		X		X	X	X			X	X	X	X	X				
Communist Party of Greece (KKE) (as part of Synaspismos)					X	X															
Synaspismos (SYN) / Coalition of the Radical Left (SYRIZA)																		X	X		
Popular Orthodox Rally (LAOS)															X						
Democratic Left (Greece) (DIMAR)																X					
Agreement for the New Greece (SNE) (as part of PASOK after 22 August 2014)																	X				
Independent Greeks (ANEL)																		X	X		
Ecologist Greens (OP)																		X	X		

==== Election results (Left-Right spectrum) ====
Left-wing/Far-Left / Centre-left/Centre / Other / Centre-right/Right-wing / Far-right
1974	9.52% / 34.17% / 54.82%
1977	12.51% / 37.29% / 42.92% / 6.82%
1981	12.52% / 49.69% / 35.88%
1981 E	18.14% / 47.69% / 31.34%
1984 E	15.79% / 43.61% / 38.05%
1985	12.14% / 46.07% / 40.84%
1989.06	13.80% / 39.85% / 45.42%
1989 E	16.55% / 38.33% / 42.19%
1989.11	11.91% / 41.09% / 46.34%
1990	11.72% / 39.46% / 47.65%
1993	7.67% / 47.11% / 44.26%
1994 E	13.25% / 38.83% / 44.10%
1996	11.10% / 46.62% / 41.12%
1999 E	15.39% / 40.58% / 39.90%
2000	9.16% / 47.32% / 42.74%
2004	9.71% / 42.64% / 45.36%
2004 E	16.32% / 35.32% / 43.01% / 4.54%
2007	14.98% / 38.43% / 42.77%
2009 E	17.51% / 37.15% / 35.05% / 7.84%
2009	15.35% / 44.30% / 33.92% / 6.08%
2012.05	30.68% / 20.92% / 36.88% / 10.91%
2012.06	33.12% / 18.83% / 38.76% / 8.86%
2014 E	35.42% / 16.81% / 31.36% / 13.37%
2015.01	42.65% / 17.44% / 32.56% / 7.32%
2015.09	44.97% / 14.09% / 32.63% / 8.29%
2019 E	36.52% / 11.18% / 36.06% / 13.07%
2019	42.68% / 9.34% / 40.35% / 7.62%
2023.05	34.55% / 11.86% / 42.10% / 11.22%
2023.06	32.51% / 12.11% / 40.82% / 14.21%
2024 E	20.17% / 27.98% / 30.13% / 21.01%

=== 2023 election ===
Party	Votes	%	Seats	+/–
New Democracy	2,114,780	40.56	158	+12
Syriza	929,968	17.83	47	–24
PASOK – Movement for Change	617,574	11.84	32	–9
Communist Party of Greece	401,187	7.69	21	–5
Spartans	241,633	4.63	12	New
Greek Solution	231,378	4.44	12	–4
Victory	192,239	3.69	10	+10
Course of Freedom	165,210	3.17	8	+8
MeRA25	130,276	2.50	0	0
Patriotic Coalition	25,990	0.50	0	New
Voice of Reason	22,432	0.43	0	New
Ecologist Greens – Green Unity	21,054	0.40	0	0
EY Movement	17,174	0.33	0	New
Antarsya	15,988	0.31	0	0
Prasino+Mov	15,911	0.31	0	New
Union of Centrists	14,881	0.29	0	0
Breath of Democracy	14,740	0.28	0	0
Movement of the Poor of Greece	13,637	0.26	0	0
Communist Party of Greece (Marxist–Leninist)	9,447	0.18	0	0
Assembly of Greeks	8,820	0.17	0	0
Marxist–Leninist Communist Party of Greece	4,296	0.08	0	0
National Front	3,013	0.06	0	New
Organisation of Internationalist Communists of Greece	1,379	0.03	0	0
Organization for the Reconstruction of the KKE	1,097	0.02	0	0
Panathinaikos Movement	299	0.01	0	0
Vision of the Renaissance of Greece	132	0.00	0	New
Digital Hellenism in the Whole	22	0.00	0	New
People's European Party	17	0.00	0	New
Republican Party of Greece – TRAMP	3	0.00	0	New
Greek Ecologists	0	0.00	0	0
Independents	0	0.00	0	0
Total	5,214,577	100.00	300	0
Valid votes	5,214,577	98.89		
Invalid votes	32,206	0.61		
Blank votes	26,289	0.50		
Total votes	5,273,072	100.00		
Registered voters/turnout	9,980,234	52.84		
Source: Ministry of Interior Hellenic Parliament

Vote share (in %)
ND	40.56%
Syriza	17.83%
PASOK-KINAL	11.84%
KKE	7.69%
Spartans	4.63%
EL	4.44%
NIKI	3.69%
PE	3.17%
Others	6.15%

Parliamentary seats
ND	52.67%
Syriza	15.67%
PASOK-KINAL	10.67%
KKE	7.00%
Spartans	4.00%
EL	4.00%
NIKI	3.33%
PE	2.67%

== Election of the President of the Republic ==
The Presidential Standard of Greece

The head of state – the President of the Hellenic Republic – is elected by Parliament for a five-year term, and a maximum of two terms in office. Eligible for President is any person who:

- has had Greek citizenship for at least five years,
- has a father or a mother of Greek origin,
- is 40 years old or more,
- is eligible to vote.

When a presidential term expires, Parliament votes to elect the new president. In the first two votes, a 2/3 majority (200 votes) is necessary. The third vote requires a 3/5 (180 votes) majority. The fourth vote requires an absolute majority (151 votes). The fifth vote requires a plurality; in case of a split vote, the candidate who collected most votes in the first vote is elected president.

Before the 2019 constitutional amendment, if the third vote was fruitless, Parliament was dissolved and elections were proclaimed by the outgoing president within the next 30 days. In the new Parliament, the election for president was repeated immediately with a 3/5 majority required for the initial vote, an absolute majority (151 votes) for the second one and a ballot between the two persons with the highest number of votes in the second election for the third and final ballot. This occurred twice before the amendment of the provision for the dissolution of the parliament: in the 1990 and 2015 elections.

=== Elected presidents of the Third Hellenic Republic (1974–present) ===
The insignia of the Presidency of the Hellenic Republic

From-To	President	Supported by	Election date	Elected in the
19 July 1975 – 10 May 1980	Konstantinos Tsatsos	New Democracy	19 June 1975	first vote
10 May 1980 – 10 March 1985	Konstantinos Karamanlis	New Democracy; KODISO; Communist Party of Greece (Interior)	5 May 1980	third vote
30 March 1985 – 4 May 1990	Christos Sartzetakis	Panhellenic Socialist Movement; Communist Party of Greece	29 March 1985	third vote
4 May 1990 – 10 March 1995	Konstantinos Karamanlis	New Democracy	4 May 1990	second vote after elections
10 March 1995 – 11 March 2000	Kostis Stephanopoulos	Panhellenic Socialist Movement; Political Spring	8 March 1995	third vote
11 March 2000 – 12 March 2005	Kostis Stephanopoulos	Panhellenic Socialist Movement; New Democracy	8 February 2000	first vote
12 March 2005 – 12 March 2010	Karolos Papoulias	New Democracy; Panhellenic Socialist Movement	8 February 2005	first vote
12 March 2010 – 13 March 2015	Karolos Papoulias	Panhellenic Socialist Movement; New Democracy; Popular Orthodox Rally	3 February 2010	first vote
13 March 2015 – 13 March 2020	Prokopis Pavlopoulos	Coalition of the Radical Left; New Democracy; Independent Greeks	18 February 2015	first vote after elections
13 March 2020 – 13 March 2025	Katerina Sakellaropoulou	New Democracy; Coalition of the Radical Left; Panhellenic Socialist Movement	22 January 2020	first vote
13 March 2025 – incumbent	Konstantinos Tasoulas	New Democracy	12 February 2025	fourth vote

== European Parliament elections ==
Greece has had a delegation of Members of the European Parliament in the European Parliament since Greek accession to the EU in 1981. Originally, the Greek delegation numbered 25, but after 2004 that was reduced to 24 (due to the increase of the EU member countries). In 2009, it was further reduced to 22, and in 2014 to 21 MEPs.

=== Electoral system ===
In the European elections, the whole country forms a single constituency and an electoral threshold is set at 3% of the vote. Members of the government and elected members of the Hellenic Parliament may only stand for election after having resigned from office.

Until 2014, the MEPs were elected on the basis of a party-list proportional representation system. Starting with the 2014 European Parliament election, candidates are elected on the basis of individual preference votes with a maximum of four preferences per voter.

=== Latest election ===
Party	Votes	%	Seats	+/–
New Democracy	1,125,602	28.31	7	–1
Syriza – Progressive Alliance	593,133	14.92	4	–2
PASOK – Movement for Change	508,399	12.79	3	+1
Greek Solution	369,727	9.30	2	+1
Communist Party of Greece	367,796	9.25	2	0
Democratic Patriotic Movement "Niki"	173,574	4.37	1	New
Course of Freedom	135,310	3.40	1	+1
Voice of Reason	120,753	3.04	1	New
MeRA25	101,127	2.54	0	0
New Left	97,554	2.45	0	New
Democrats	57,496	1.45	0	New
Patriots – Prodromos Emfietzoglou	56,100	1.41	0	New
Kosmos	42,762	1.08	0	New
I PARTICIPATE for National Sovereignty and Cyprus	30,600	0.77	0	New
Party of Friendship, Equality and Peace	28,470	0.72	0	0
Green Movement	26,555	0.67	0	New
Together for a Free Greece (KEKA – AKKEL)	20,816	0.52	0	0
Antarsya – Anti-Capitalist Cooperation	20,603	0.52	0	0
Creation	14,024	0.35	0	0
United Popular Front	13,816	0.35	0	0
Movement 21	12,449	0.31	0	New
Union of Centrists	10,933	0.27	0	0
Conservatives	10,146	0.26	0	New
Popular Orthodox Rally	9,936	0.25	0	0
National Front	7,572	0.19	0	0
Assembly of Greeks	6,980	0.18	0	0
Marxist–Leninist Communist Party of Greece	6,836	0.17	0	0
National Independence Movement	2,465	0.06	0	New
Organisation of Internationalist Communists of Greece	1,973	0.05	0	0
Organization for the Reconstruction of the KKE	1,615	0.04	0	0
Diaspora Network of European Greeks	963	0.02	0	New
Total	3,976,085	100.00	21	0
Valid votes	3,976,085	97.88		
Invalid votes	55,293	1.36		
Blank votes	30,714	0.76		
Total votes	4,062,092	100.00		
Registered voters/turnout	9,814,685	41.39		
Source: Ministry Of The Interior

=== Past European Parliament elections since 1981 ===
- 1981 European Parliament election in Greece
- 1984 European Parliament election in Greece
- 1989 European Parliament election in Greece
- 1994 European Parliament election in Greece
- 1999 European Parliament election in Greece
- 2004 European Parliament election in Greece
- 2009 European Parliament election in Greece
- 2014 European Parliament election in Greece
- 2019 European Parliament election in Greece

== Local elections ==
Local administration in Greece recently underwent extensive reform in two phases: the first phase, implemented in 1997 and commonly called the "Kapodistrias Project", consolidated the country's numerous municipalities and communities down to approximately 1000. The second phase, initially called "Kapodistrias II" but eventually named the "Callicrates Project", was implemented in 2010; it further consolidated municipalities down to 370, and merged the country's 54 prefectures into 13 peripheries. The Callicratean municipalities were designed according to several guidelines; for example each island (except Crete) was formed into a single municipality, while the majority of small towns were incorporated so as to have an average municipal population of 25,000.

The first prefectural elections took place in 1994; previously, prefects were executive appointees. Municipal elections were held since the formation of the modern Greek state, in the early 19th century.

Local administrators elected in 2010, following the Callicrates reform, were to serve a "rump" 3.5-year term. Starting in 2014, peripheral and municipal elections were to be held every five years, concurrently with elections for the European Parliament. However, this was changed to 4 years in 2018. In all local elections, the winning candidacy list is guaranteed a minimum three-fifths majority in the respective councils.

=== Past local elections since 1974 ===
- 1975 Greek local elections
- 1978 Greek local elections
- 1982 Greek local elections
- 1986 Greek local elections
- 1990 Greek local elections
- 1994 Greek local elections
- 1998 Greek local elections
- 2002 Greek local elections
- 2006 Greek local elections
- 2010 Greek local elections
- 2014 Greek local elections
- 2019 Greek local elections
- 2023 Greek local elections

== Referendums ==
The current Constitution provides for two kinds of referendums:

- a referendum concerning a "passed law"
- a referendum concerning a matter of "national interest".

The latest referendum was indeed concerning a matter of "national interest", in contrast to all the previous ones that concerned the form of government, specifically regarding the Greek monarchy.

=== Previous referendums ===
There were 7 referendums in Greece from 1920 to 1974. All but one had to do with the form of government, namely retention/reestablishment or abolition of the monarchy. The 1974 referendum resulted in confirming of the parliamentary republic. The only referendum not concerning only the form of government was the constitutional referendum in 1968 held by the military junta. There were no referendums in Greece between 1974 and 2014. In 2015, the Greeks voted no on the bailout proposed by the ECB and IMF, which was however rejected by the government.

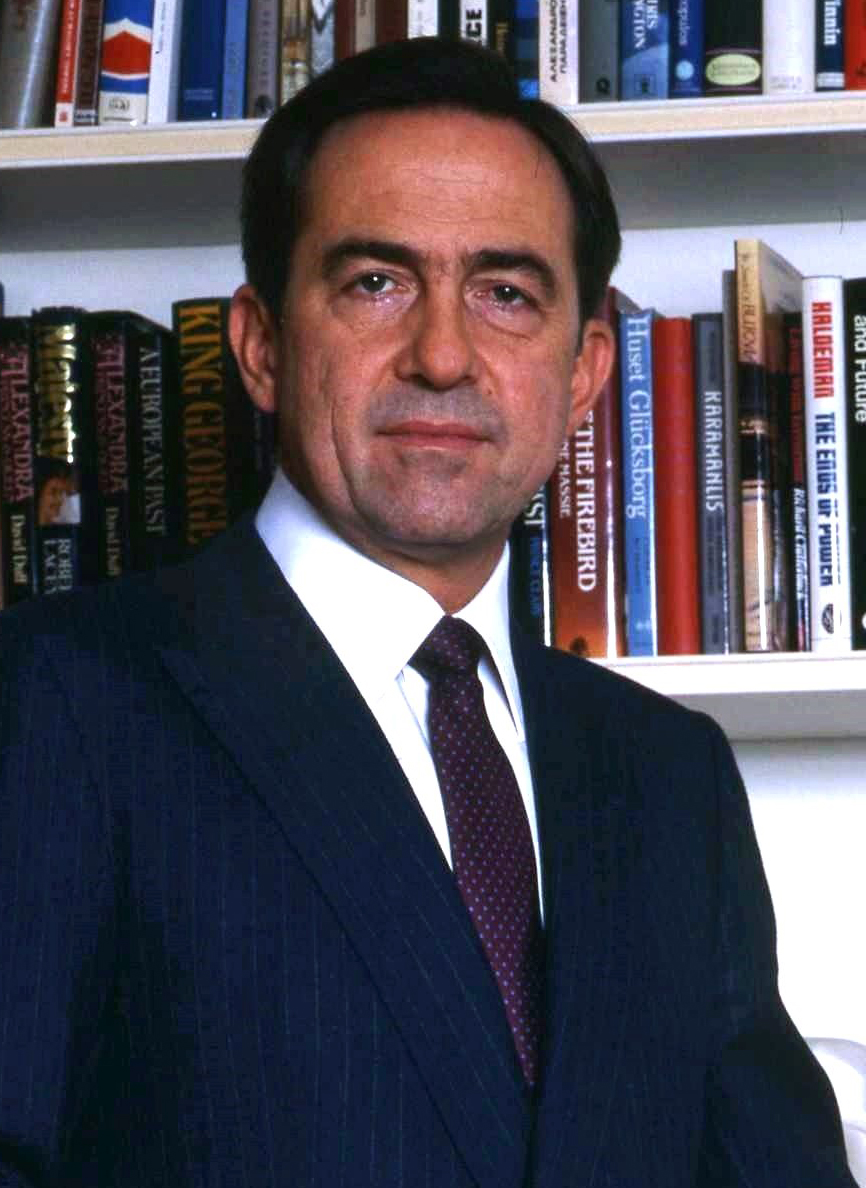
King Constantine II

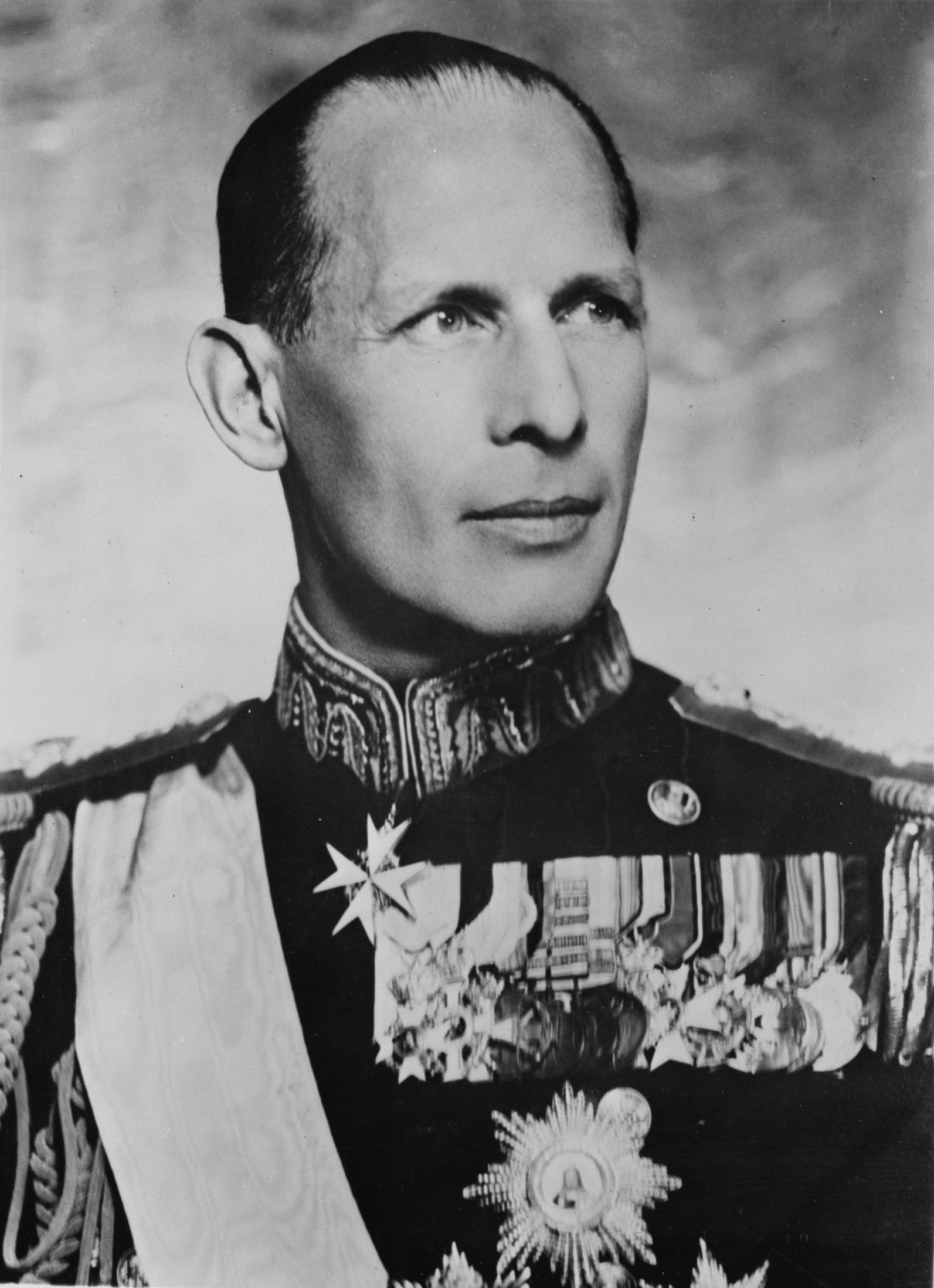
King George II

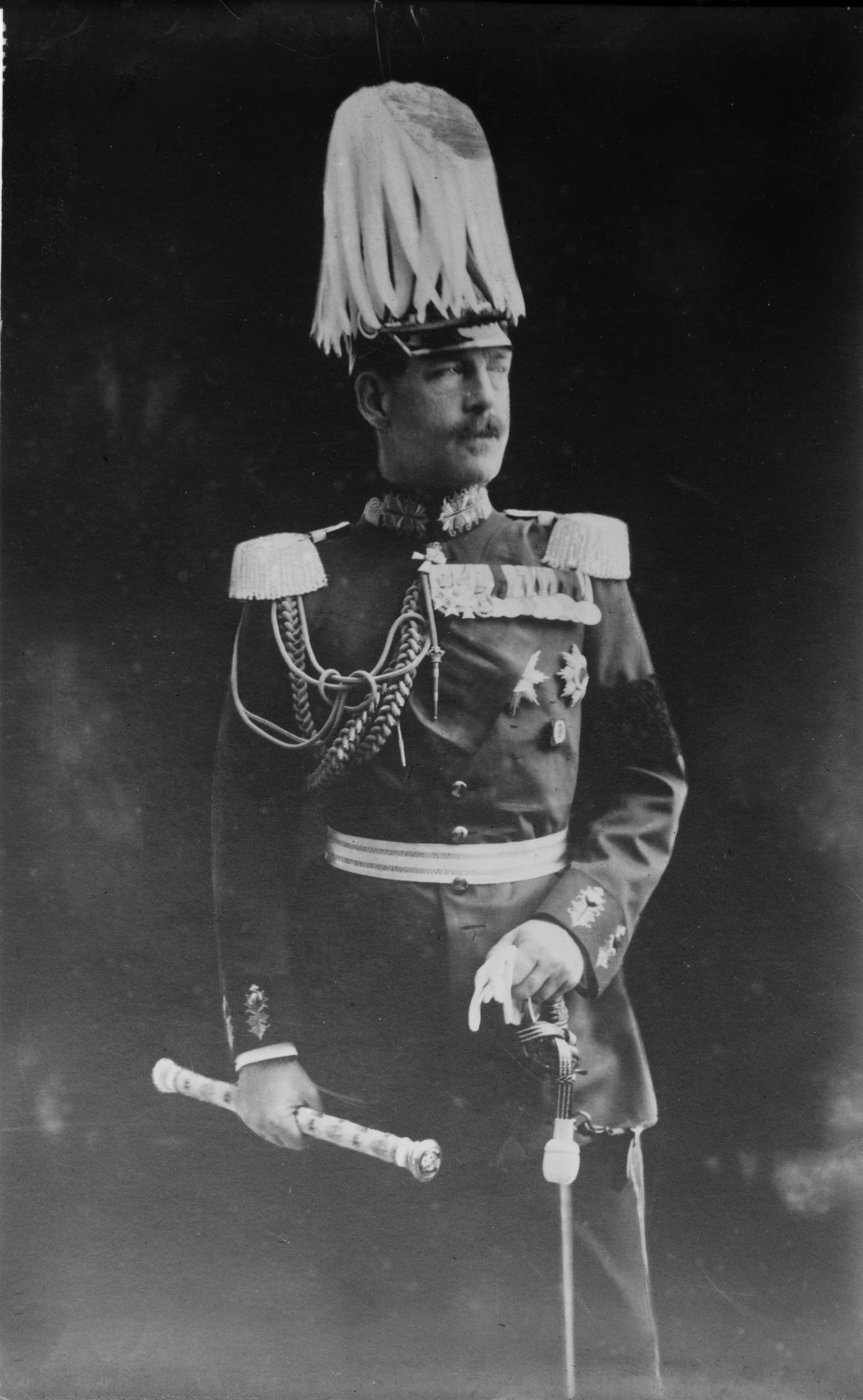
King Constantine I

== See also ==
- Politics of Greece
