= List of members of the European Parliament for Greece, 1984–1989 =

Members of the European Parliament for Greece
Delegation	(1981)
1st term	(1981)
2nd term	(1984)
3rd term	(1989)
4th term	(1994)
5th term	(1999)
6th term	(2004)
7th term	(2009)
8th term	(2014)
9th term	(2019)
10th term	(2024)

This is the list of the members of the European Parliament for Greece in the 1984 to 1989 session. See 1984 European Parliament election in Greece for election results.

== List ==
Name	National party	EP Group
Dimitrios Adamou	Communist Party	COM
Alekos Alavanos	Communist Party	COM
Georgios Anastassopoulos	New Democracy	EPP
Evangelos Averoff	New Democracy	EPP
Paraskevas Avgerinos	Socialist Movement	SOC
Ioannis Boutos	New Democracy	EPP
Efthymios Christodoulou	New Democracy	EPP
Chrysanthos Dimitriadis	National Political Union	ER
Vassilis Ephremidis	Communist Party	COM
Dimitrios Evrigenis	New Democracy	EPP
Nikolaos Gazis	Socialist Movement	SOC
Kyriakos Gerontopoulos	New Democracy	EPP
Marietta Giannakou	New Democracy	EPP
Manolis Glezos	Socialist Movement	SOC
Leonidas Kyrkos	Communist Party – Interior	COM
Panayotis Lambrias	New Democracy	EPP
Georgios Mavros	Socialist Movement	SOC
Konstantina Pantazi	Socialist Movement	SOC
Christos Papoutsis	Socialist Movement	SOC
Spyridon Plaskovitis	Socialist Movement	SOC
Georgios Romeos	Socialist Movement	SOC
Ioannis Tzounis	New Democracy	EPP
Grigoris Varfis	Socialist Movement	SOC
Nikolaos Vgenopoulos	Socialist Movement	SOC
