= List of members of the European Parliament for Greece, 1981–1984 =

Members of the European Parliament for Greece
Delegation	(1981)
1st term	(1981)
2nd term	(1984)
3rd term	(1989)
4th term	(1994)
5th term	(1999)
6th term	(2004)
7th term	(2009)
8th term	(2014)
9th term	(2019)
10th term	(2024)

This is the list of the 24 members of the European Parliament for Greece in the 1979 to 1984 session. See 1981 European Parliament election in Greece for election results.

== List ==
Name	National party	EP Group
Dimitrios Adamou	Communist Party	COM
Alékos Alavános	Communist Party	COM
Leonidas Bournias	New Democracy	EPP
Vassilis Ephremidis	Communist Party	COM
Antonios Georgiadis	Socialist Movement	SOC
Achillefs Gerokostopoulos	New Democracy	EPP
Konstantinos Gontikas	New Democracy	EPP
Konstantinos Kallias	New Democracy	EPP
Konstantinos Kaloyannis	New Democracy	EPP
Filotas Kazazis	New Democracy	EPP
Dimitrios Koulourianos	Socialist Movement	SOC
Leonidas Kyrkos	Communist Party (Interior)	COM
Leonidas Lagakos	Socialist Movement	SOC
Christos Markopoulos	Socialist Movement	SOC
Kalliopi Nikolaou	Socialist Movement	SOC
Konstantinos Nikolaou	Socialist Movement	SOC
Konstantina Pantazi	Socialist Movement	SOC
Efstratios Papaefstratiou	New Democracy	EPP
Apostolos Papageorgiou	Progressive Party	NI
Yiannos Papantoniou	Socialist Movement	SOC
Yiangos Pesmazoglou	Party of Democratic Socialism	NI
Spyridon Plaskovitis	Socialist Movement	SOC
Mihaïl Protopapadakis	New Democracy	EPP
Nikolaos Vgenopoulos	Socialist Movement	SOC
