= Vgenopoulos =

Vgenopoulos (Greek: Βγενόπουλος) is a Greek surname. Notable people with the surname include:

- Andreas Vgenopoulos (1953–2016), Greek fencer, lawyer, businessman and football investor
- Nikolaos Vgenopoulos (1926–1985), Greek member of the European Parliament for Greece
