= Greek Socialist Party =

Greek Socialist Party for Democracy and Development (ESK) Ελληνικό Σοσιαλιστικό Κόμμα για τη Δημοκρατία και την Ανάπτυξη
- Founder: Gerasimos Arsenis
- Founded: 1987
- Dissolved: 1989
- Split from: Panhellenic Socialist Movement
- Ideology: Social democracy Democratic socialism
- Political position: Centre-left

Greek Socialist Party for Democracy and Development (ESK) (Greek: Ελληνικό Σοσιαλιστικό Κόμμα για τη Δημοκρατία και την Ανάπτυξη) was a Greek political party founded in April 1987 by Gerasimos Arsenis after his expulsion from the Panhellenic Socialist Movement.

Among his members were the unionists Christos Kokkinovasilis and Dimitris Pipergias(passed away 9 July 2025 aged 74), Rovertos Spyropoulos and actress Nora Katseli. The party expressed those who were dissatisfied with the Economic stabilization program of 1985-1987 of Costas Simitis, Minister of National Economy.

He took part in the election of June, 1989 and gained 0.21%. In the European election of 1989 the party received 43,654 votes and gained 0.66%. A few months later, Gerasimos Arsenis returned to Panhellenic Socialist Movement and the party dissolved.
