= Political Spring =

Political Spring Πολιτική Άνοιξη
- Abbreviation: POLAN
- Founder: Antonis Samaras
- Founded: 30 June 1993
- Dissolved: 13 May 2004
- Split from: New Democracy
- Merged into: New Democracy
- Political position: Right-wing

Website
- www.politikianixi.gr (archived)

Political Spring (Greek: Πολιτική Άνοιξη, Politiki Anoiksi) was a Greek conservative political party founded in June 1993 by Antonis Samaras. The party was formed after Antonis Samaras broke away from the governing New Democracy party after being dismissed as Foreign Minister over his hardline stance on the Macedonia naming dispute.

Political Spring gained 4.9% in the National Elections of 1993 earning ten seats in the Parliament. It gained 8.7% in the elections for the European Parliament in 1994 earning two seats. Its decline started in the National Elections of 1996, when it gained 2.94%, just below the national threshold of 3%, thus not being able to earn any seats in the Parliament. It participated in the elections for European Parliament in 1999. However, it received 2.3% of the popular vote, which was again below the threshold; it was considered a major failure, and lead to a gradual dissolution of the party. Political Spring did not participate in the elections of 2000, but Antonis Samaras publicly supported the New Democracy party. Before the next general elections in April 2004, Samaras rejoined New Democracy and he was elected as an MEP in June 2004.

== Electoral results ==
Results, 1993-1999 (year links to election page)
Year	Type of Election	Votes	%	Mandates
1993	Parliament	336,460	4.88	10
1994	European Parliament	564,778	8.65	2
1996	Parliament	199,463	2.94	0
1999	European Parliament	146,512	2.28	0
2000	Parliament	supported ND	-	-
2004	Parliament	supported ND	-	-
2004	European Parliament	participated with ND	-	1
