= 1984 European Parliament election in Greece =

← 1981	17 June 1984	1989 →

24 seats to the European Parliament

The 1984 European Parliament election in Greece was the election of the delegation from Greece to the European Parliament in 1984. This was the second European election and the first time Greece voted with the rest of the Community.

== Results ==
Party	Votes	%	+/–	Seats	+/–
PASOK	2,476,491	41.58	+1.46	10	0
New Democracy	2,266,568	38.05	+6.71	9	+1
Communist Party of Greece	693,304	11.64	–1.20	3	0
Communist Party of Greece (Interior)	203,813	3.42	–1.88	1	0
National Political Union	136,642	2.29	New	1	New
Party of Democratic Socialism	47,389	0.80	–3.46	0	–1
Christian Democracy	26,735	0.45	–0.70	0	0
Liberal Party	20,908	0.35	–0.69	0	0
Revolutionary Communist Movement	17,789	0.30	New	0	New
Union of the Democratic Centre	16,848	0.28	–0.84	0	0
Fighting Socialist Party	10,389	0.17	New	0	New
Progressive Party	10,152	0.17	–1.79	0	0
Free	8,816	0.15	New	0	New
ESPE	8,282	0.14	New	0	New
International Workers' Union – Trotskyists	6,342	0.11	New	0	New
United Nationalist Movement	5,592	0.09	New	0	New
Total	5,956,060	100.00	–	24	0
Valid votes	5,956,060	99.07			
Invalid/blank votes	55,756	0.93			
Total votes	6,011,816	100.00			
Registered voters/turnout	7,790,309	77.17			
Source: Ikaria

== Elected MEPs ==
- List of members of the European Parliament for Greece, 1984–1989
