= 1989 European Parliament election in Greece =

← 1984	18 June 1989	1994 →

24 seats in the European Parliament
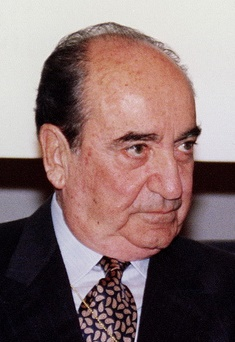

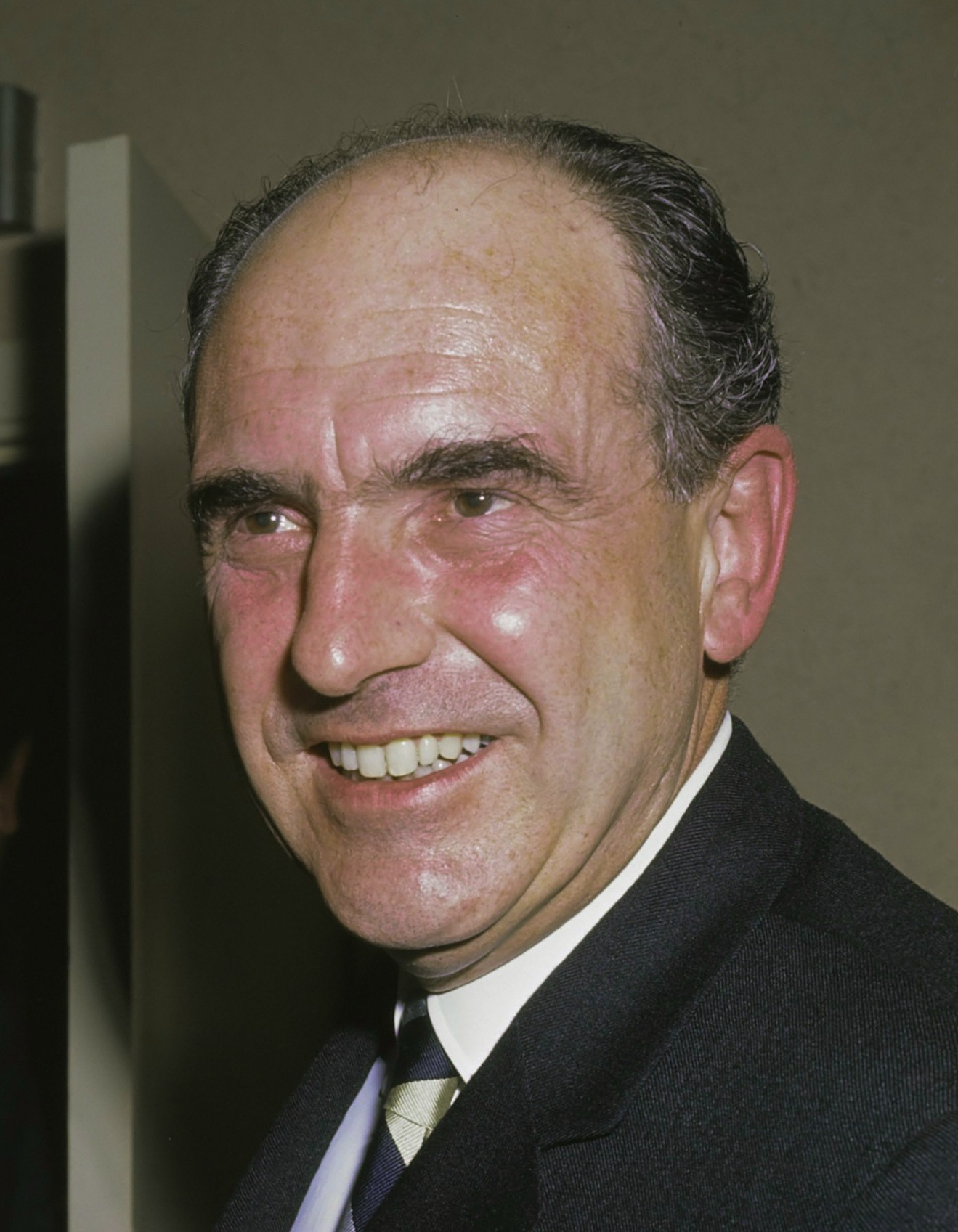

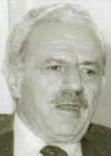

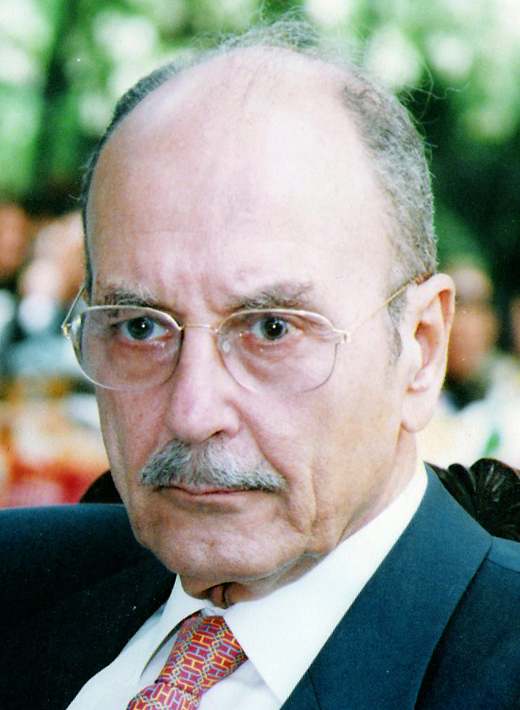
	Majority party	Minority party
Leader	Constantine Mitsotakis	Andreas Papandreou
Party	ND	PASOK
Alliance	EPP–ED	PES
Last election	38.05%, 9 seats	41.58%, 10 seats
Seats won	10	9
Seat change	▲1	▼1
Popular vote	2,659,435	2,366,460
Percentage	40.41%	35.96%
Swing	▲2.36pp	▼4.99pp
	Third party	Fourth party
Leader	Charilaos Florakis	Costis Stephanopoulos
Party	Synaspismos	DIANA
Alliance	GUE/NGL	EDA
Last election	–	–
Seats won	4	1
Seat change	New	New
Popular vote	941,913	89,811
Percentage	14.31%	1.36%
Swing	New	New

European Parliament elections were held in Greece on 18 June 1989 to elect the 24 Greek members of the European Parliament. Members were elected by party-list proportional representation.

== Results ==
The 1994 European election was the third election to the European Parliament in which Greece participated. The European Parliament Election took place a few days before the national parliamentary elections and presaged the results of that election. The ruling PASOK under the leadership of Andreas Papandreou suffered strong losses against the opposition conservative New Democracy party and a coalition of the left and communist parties running as the Coalition of the Left and Progress. A new party Democratic Renewal reflected the organization of Costis Stephanopoulos who had left New Democracy and came in fourth, barely crossing the threshold.

Party	Votes	%	Seats	+/–
New Democracy	2,659,435	40.41	10	+1
PASOK	2,366,460	35.96	9	–1
Synaspismos	941,913	14.31	4	New
Democratic Renewal	89,811	1.36	1	New
National Political Union	77,095	1.17	0	–1
Alternative Ecologists	72,826	1.11	0	New
Democratic Ecological Movement	69,249	1.05	0	New
Greek Socialist Party	43,654	0.66	0	New
KKE Interior – Renewing Left	41,790	0.63	0	New
Greek Radical Movement	40,816	0.62	0	New
Ecological Movement–Political Renewal	27,540	0.42	0	New
Christian Democracy	26,970	0.41	0	0
Liberal Party	26,040	0.40	0	0
Direct Democracy	25,150	0.38	0	New
Union of the Democratic Centre	18,313	0.28	0	0
United Nationalist Movement	15,183	0.23	0	New
New Politics	12,376	0.19	0	New
European Economic Movement	8,237	0.13	0	New
Autonomous Revolutionary Political Movement	7,527	0.11	0	New
EPEKE	7,021	0.11	0	New
Party of National Fighters	4,263	0.06	0	New
Total	6,581,669	100.00	24	0
Valid votes	6,581,669	98.16		
Invalid/blank votes	123,511	1.84		
Total votes	6,705,180	100.00		
Registered voters/turnout	8,377,904	80.03		
Source: Ikraria
