= New Democracy (Greece) =

Political party in Greece

New Democracy Νέα Δημοκρατία Néa Dimokratía
- Abbreviation: ND; ΝΔ
- President: Kyriakos Mitsotakis
- Vice Presidents: Adonis Georgiadis; Kostis Hatzidakis
- Secretary: Konstantinos Kyranakis
- Spokesperson: Alexandra Sdoukou
- Founder: Konstantinos Karamanlis
- Founded: 4 October 1974; 52 years ago
- Preceded by: National Radical Union
- Headquarters: Peiraios 62, Moschato
- Student wing: Democratic Renewal Vanguard - New Democratic Student Movement (abbr. ΔΑΠ - ΝΔΦΚ) (universities' organization); Student Independent Movement (abbr. MAKI) (school organization)
- Youth wing: Youth Organisation of New Democracy
- Foundation: Constantinos Karamanlis Institute for Democracy
- Trade union wing: Democratic Independent Movement of Workers (ΔΑΚΕ)
- Ideology: Liberal conservatism Christian democracy
- Political position: Centre-right to right-wing
- European affiliation: European People's Party
- European Parliament group: European People's Party Group
- International affiliation: Centrist Democrat International; International Democracy Union
- Colours: Blue
- Slogan: Σταθερά, Τολμηρά, Μπροστά ('Steadily, Boldly, Forward')
- Anthem: "Νέα Δημοκρατία" ('New Democracy')
- Parliament: 156 / 300
- European Parliament: 7 / 21
- Regional governors: 11 / 13
- Regional councillors: 226 / 611
- Mayors: 202 / 332

Party flag

Website
- nd.gr

New Democracy, (Note: Greek: Νέα Δημοκρατία, romanized: Néa Dimokratía [ˈnea ðimokraˈti.a], ND/ΝΔ) also known by its acronym ND, is a liberal-conservative and a major political party in Greece. In contemporary Greek politics, New Democracy has been the main centre-right to right-wing political party of the country. New Democracy was created in the wake of the fall of the military junta in 1974 and has regularly governed Greece since its establishment. It was founded in 1974 by Konstantinos Karamanlis and in the same year it formed the first cabinet of the Third Hellenic Republic. New Democracy is a member of the European People's Party since 1999, the largest European political party, the Centrist Democrat International, and the International Democracy Union.

The support of New Democracy comes from a wide electorate base ranging from centrists to conservatives and from nationalists to post-modernists. From a geographical perspective, its main nonvolatile support base is in the southern Peloponnese, Eastern Attica, Northern Athens and Chios. Its support is generally weaker in Epirus and Western Greece such as Arta, Achaia, Ioannina, the city of Thessaloniki and Crete. Traditionally, New Democracy received the greatest percentages in Laconia, Messenia, Kastoria and Serres. Having spent four and a half years as an opposition party, New Democracy regained its majority in the Hellenic Parliament and returned to government under Kyriakos Mitsotakis after the 2019 Greek parliamentary election. The party secured another absolute majority in Parliament in the June 2023 Greek parliamentary election.

The party has garnered acclaim for its strides in economic development since 2019, notably emphasizing digitization and post-crisis recovery economics, after delivering economic growth. New Democracy has received accolades for its commitment to liberal reforms and a robust emphasis on pro-Europeanism, successfully securing funds from the European Union to fuel domestic development initiatives. Furthermore, commendation has been extended to the party for effectively reducing both overall unemployment and youth unemployment in the aftermath of the COVID-19 pandemic.

New Democracy has also faced criticism for its role in the fiscal crisis that engulfed Greece in the late 2000s to the 2010s, as well as its financial management during the 2000s. Academic scholars have highlighted the party's penchant for lacking transparency concerning financial data and resource utilization, which has raised concerns about their accountability as a political entity within the country. Moreover, the party has come under fire for its debt to Greek banks, amounting to 435 million euros as of 2023.

== History ==
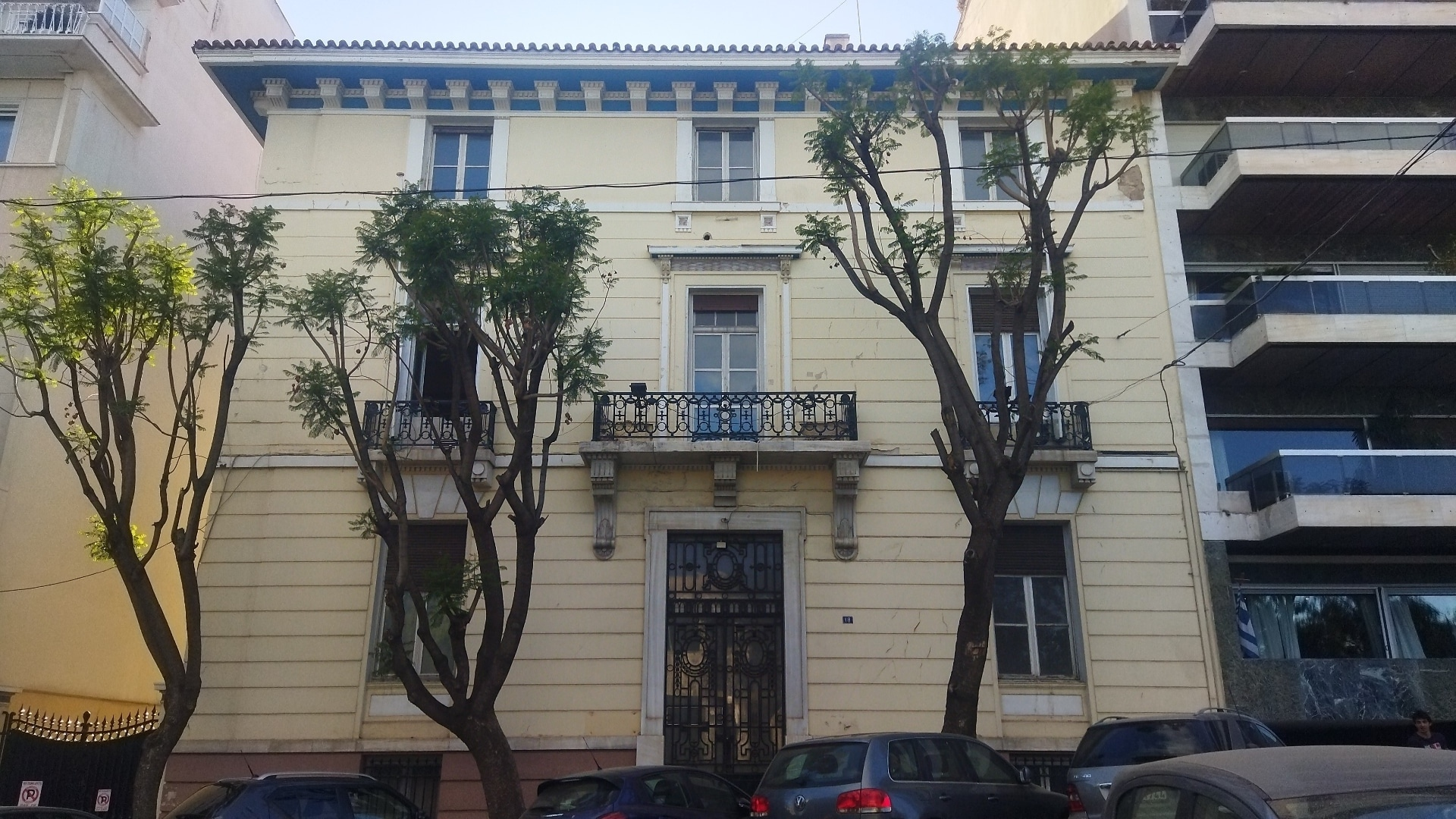
Historical Headquarters of New Democracy in Righillis Street

=== Foundation ===
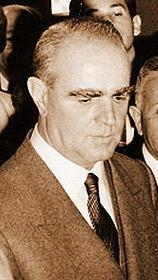
Konstantinos Karamanlis, founder of New Democracy

New Democracy traces its roots to the People's Party and the National Radical Union (ERE). New Democracy was founded on 4 October 1974 by Konstantinos Karamanlis, at the beginning of the metapolitefsi era following the fall of the Greek junta. Karamanlis, who had already served as Prime Minister of Greece from 1955 to 1963, was sworn in as the first Prime Minister of the Third Hellenic Republic in a national unity government on 24 July 1974, until the first free elections of the new era. He intended New Democracy to be a more modern and progressive political party than the right-wing parties that ruled Greece before the 1967 Greek coup d'état. The party's ideology was defined as "radical liberalism", a term defined as "the prevalence of free market rules with the decisive intervention of the state in favour of social justice."

=== First government (1974–1981) ===
In the 1974 legislative election, New Democracy obtained a massive parliamentary majority of 220 seats with a record 54.37% of the vote, a result attributed to the personal appeal of Karamanlis to the electorate. Karamanlis was elected as prime minister and soon decided to hold a referendum on 8 December 1974 for the issue of the form of government; with a large majority of 69.17%, monarchy was eventually abolished in favour of a republic. The next major issue for the New Democracy cabinet was the creation of the Constitution of Greece, which entered into force in 1975 and established Greece as a parliamentary republic. On 12 June 1975, Greece applied to join the European Communities, of which it was already an associate member since 1961, while it had already been readmitted to the Council of Europe on 28 November 1974.

In the 1977 election, New Democracy won again a large parliamentary majority of 171 seats, albeit with a reduced percentage of popular vote (41.84%). Under Karamanlis, Greece redefined its relations with NATO and tried to resolve the Cyprus problem following the Turkish invasion of the island. In 1979, the first conference of the party was held in Chalkidiki, where its ideological principles defined under the term "radical liberalism" were unanimously approved, as well as its statute and the operating regulations of its organizations. It was the first conference of any Greek political party whose delegates were elected by the members.

Karamanlis' vision concerning the accession of Greece into the European Communities, despite the resolute opposition of the Panhellenic Socialist Movement (PASOK) and the Communist Party of Greece (KKE), led to the signing of the Treaty of Accession on 28 May 1979 in Athens; following the ratification of the act by the Hellenic Parliament on 28 June 1979, Greece became the tenth member state of the European Communities on 1 January 1981. Karamanlis was criticised by opposing parties for not holding a referendum, even though Greece's accession into the European Communities had been in the forefront of New Democracy's political platform, under which the party had been elected to power.

Under Karamanlis, the government nationalized several privately owned conglomerates and infrastructure monopolies, including Olympic Airways and the Commercial Bank of Greece (Emporiki). The government was accused by conservative critics and industrialists of "socialmania" (σοσιαλμανία). This strategy led to the expansion of the public sector.

Karamanlis relinquished the premiership in 1980 and was elected as President of Greece by the parliament, serving until 1985. Georgios Rallis was elected as the new leader of New Democracy and succeeded Karamanlis in premiership.

=== Opposition and Mitsotakis' rise to power (1981–1989) ===
Under the leadership of Georgios Rallis, New Democracy was defeated in the 1981 legislative elections by Andreas Papandreou's PASOK which ran on a left-wing progressive platform, and was placed in opposition for a first time with 35.87% share of the vote and 115 seats. On the same day, on 18 October 1981, New Democracy was also defeated in the first Greek election to the European Parliament. In the following December, the party's parliamentary group elected Evangelos Averoff, former Minister for National Defence, as president of New Democracy. Averoff made a turn to the hardline right. He opposed the official recognition of the communist resistance groups in the Greek Resistance by the Papandreou government and promised he would overturn it. Following the 1984 European Parliament election, he resigned citing health reasons and was subsequently declared an Honorary President. On 1 September 1984, Konstantinos Mitsotakis succeeded him in the party's presidency. Mitsotakis embraced economic liberalism and fiscal conservatism, taking inspiration from Reagan and Thatcher, and campaigned on reducing government intervention in the economy. He managed to increase New Democracy's percentage in the 1985 elections to 40.85%, although it was defeated again and remained in opposition.

=== Second government (1989–1993) ===
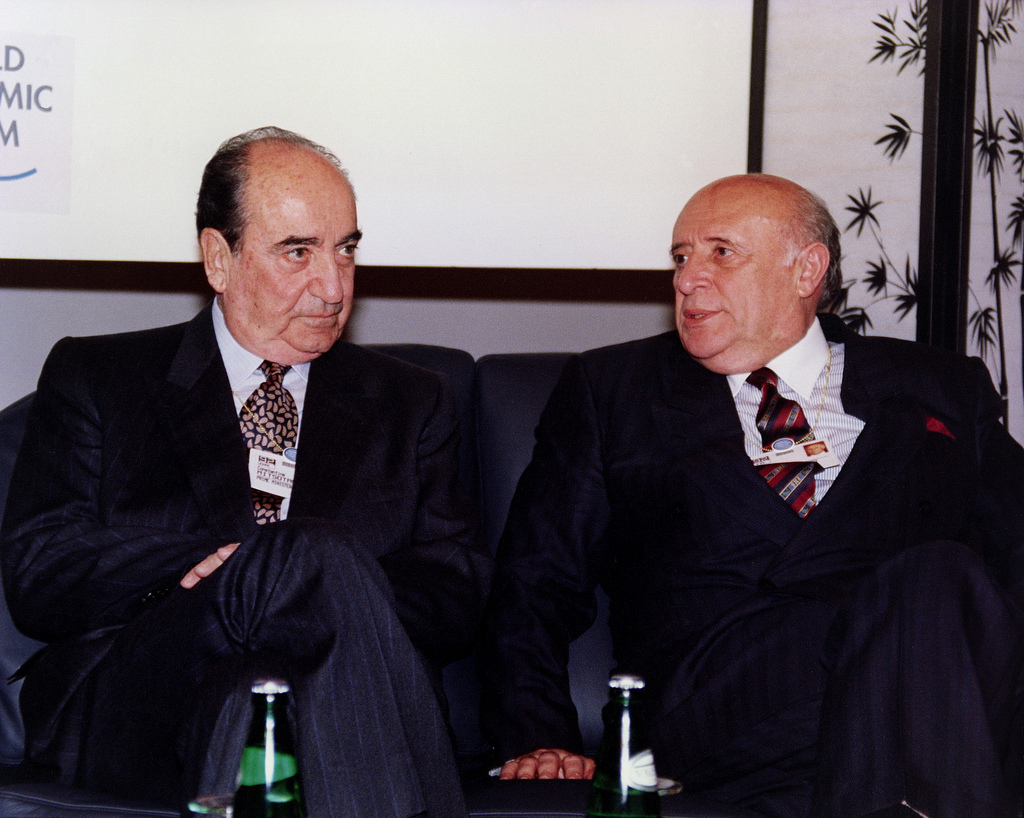
Konstantinos Mitsotakis and Süleyman Demirel (Prime Ministers of Greece and Turkey respectively) in the 1992 World Economic Forum

Mitsotakis led New Democracy to a clear win in the June 1989 legislative elections registering 44.28% of the vote but, due to the modification of the electoral law by the outbound PASOK government, New Democracy obtained only 145 seats which were not enough to form a government on its own. The aftermath was the formation of a coalition government under Tzannis Tzannetakis, consisted of New Democracy and Coalition of the Left and Progress (Synaspismos), with the latter also including at the time the Communist Party of Greece. In the subsequent elections of November 1989, New Democracy took one more comfortable win, increasing its share to 46.19% of the vote and 148 seats but, under the same electoral law, they were still short of forming a government and this led to a national unity government along with PASOK and Synaspismos, under Xenophon Zolotas.

Eventually, in the 1990 election Mitsotakis' New Democracy defeated once again Papandreou's PASOK with a lead of 8.28%, but this time the 46.89% of votes awarded them with 150 seats, which allowed Mitsotakis to form a majority in the parliament with the support of Democratic Renewal's (DIANA) sole member of parliament and one more seat given by the Supreme Special Court, after a mistake in seat calculation was detected. After three consecutive wide wins with high vote percentages, Mitsotakis became the 178th Prime Minister of Greece and the 7th Prime Minister of the 3rd Hellenic Republic though with a slim parliamentary majority of 152 seats due to the electoral law in force at the time.

In a turbulent international political environment following the 1989 Fall of Communism in Europe, Mitsotakis' government focused on cutting government spending, the privatization of state enterprises, the reformation of the public administration, and the restoration of the original electoral system, with the addition of an election threshold of 3%. More specifically, his government repealed the wage price index, which kept people's incomes high while fueling inflation: a popular PASOK law since 1982, when it was first introduced. Mitsotakis' government sold or liquidated 44 companies controlled by the "Industrial Reconstruction Organisation," which was created by PASOK and was designed to assist failed firms in recovery. Certain areas, such as banking, were deregulated to attract capital. While the Greek economy started to recover towards meeting the Euro convergence criteria, austerity policies caused significant frustration among the Greek voters.

In foreign policy, the priorities were the restoration of confidence among Greece's economic and political partners, NATO, and the United States. Mitsotakis initiated efforts designed to improve relations with the US, which Papandreou's anti-American rhetoric had damaged. In July 1990, a defense cooperation agreement was signed regarding the operation of American bases in Greece for the next eight years. Mitsotakis took the initiative for Greece to formally recognize the State of Israel, making it the last EEC member to do so. Mitsotakis also supported a new dialogue with Turkey on the Cyprus dispute and a compromise over the Macedonia naming dispute; the latter triggered an irritation among the MPs of New Democracy, which led Antonis Samaras to leave it and form a new political party in June 1993, Political Spring; one more withdrawal later from its parliamentary group resulted in New Democracy's loss of the majority in the parliament and the call of early elections.

=== Opposition (1993–2004) ===
In the 1993 elections, New Democracy suffered an easy defeat with 39.30% of the vote, something that led to Mitsotakis' resignation and the election of Miltiadis Evert in the party's leadership. In the early 1996 legislative election, New Democracy was defeated again by Costas Simitis' PASOK registering 38.12%, but Evert obtained a re-election as the party's leader in the same year. However, in the spring of 1997 a new conference took place, in order to elect a new president among others. Kostas Karamanlis, nephew of the party's founder, was elected the sixth president of New Democracy. Under Karamanlis, New Democracy shifted closer to the political center and became less ideological and more managerial.

Under Karamanlis, New Democracy experienced an evident increase in popularity, but in the 2000 elections they lost by only 1.06% of the popular vote, the smallest margin in modern Greek history, registering 42.74% and obtaining 125 seats in the parliament. By 2003, New Democracy was consistently leading Simitis' PASOK in opinion polls; in January 2004 Simitis resigned and announced elections for 7 March, while George Papandreou succeeded him in PASOK's leadership.

=== Third government (2004–2009) ===
Despite speculation that Papandreou would succeed in restoring the party's fortunes, in the 2004 election Karamanlis managed to take a clear win with 45.36% of the vote and 165 seats, and New Democracy returned to power after eleven years in opposition, scoring an all-time record of 3,359,682 votes in the history of Greek elections. The regions that consistently support New Democracy include the Peloponnese, Central Macedonia and West Macedonia. On the other hand, the party is weak in Crete, the Aegean Islands, Attica and West Greece.

In social policy, the retirement age was raised from 58 to 60 for those with 35 years of insurance, while early retirement went up from 55 to 60 for those who entered the labor market after 1993. Supplementary pensions were also cut. In addition, mothers with under-aged children could retire at 55 instead of 50, while paid maternity leave was extended to 6 months in the private sector.

Rising unemployment and the threat of inflation undermined Karamanlis' promises to kick-start the economy and sparked strikes, especially one in 2006 by rubbish collectors, causing severe disruption in the economy. In early 2006, it was revealed that the cellular phone of Kostas Karamanlis, as well as those of several other members of the government and officials of the armed forces, had been wiretapped for several months during and after the 2004 Athens Olympics. The prime minister came under criticism during the wildfires of 2007. With hundreds of thousands of acres burning and many deaths, the government had faced growing scrutiny for its response to the fires.

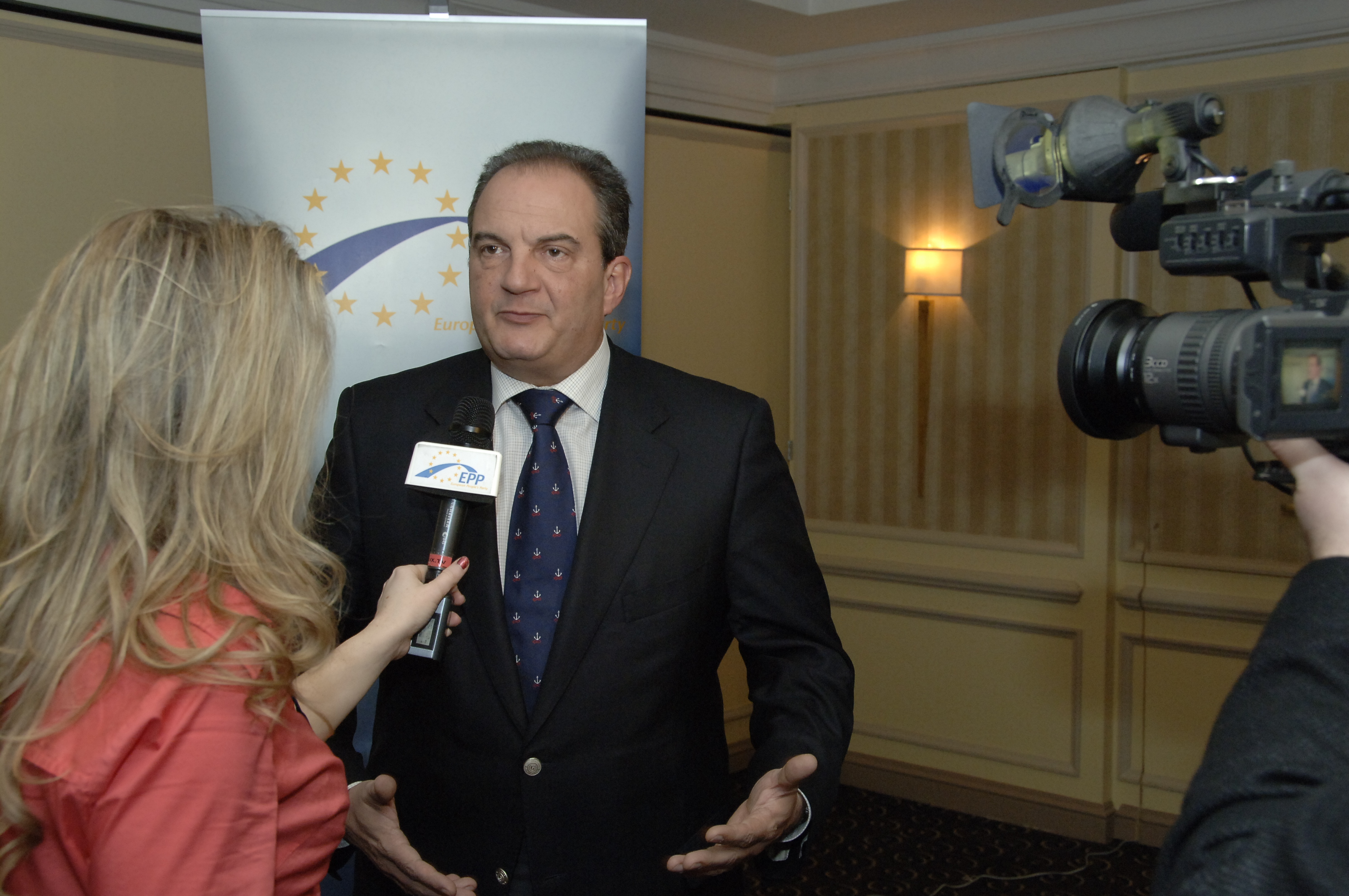
Kostas Karamanlis giving an interview at a 2008 EPP summit

On 16 September 2007, Kostas Karamanlis won re-election with a diminished majority in Parliament, and stated: "Thank you for your trust. You have spoken loud and clear and chosen the course the country will take in the next few years." George Papandreou, PASOK, accepted defeat (New Democracy party with 41.87%, and opposition party PASOK had 38.1%).

=== 2009 defeat ===
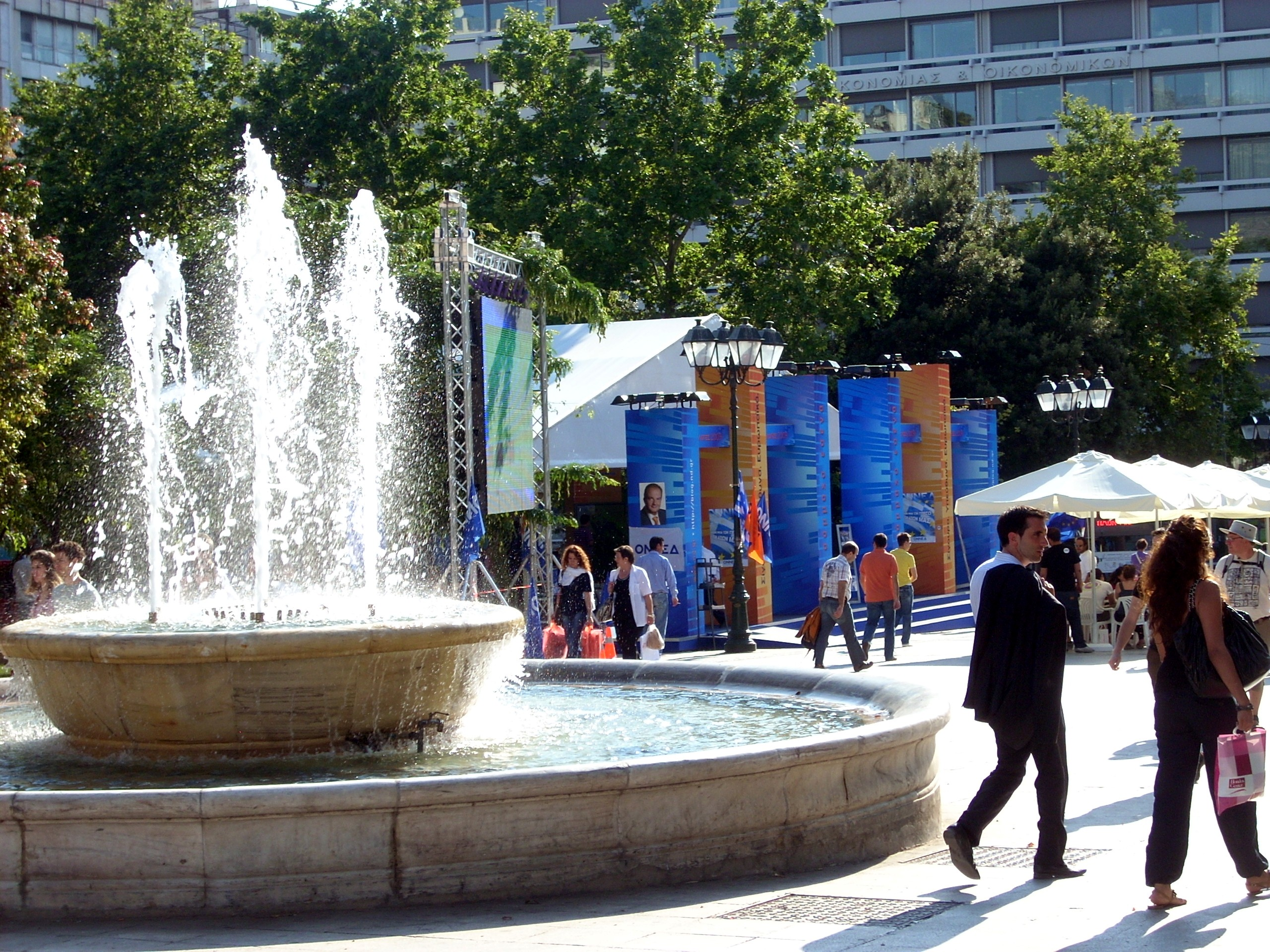
Political campaign of party New Democracy before the European Parliament election in Greece in 2009

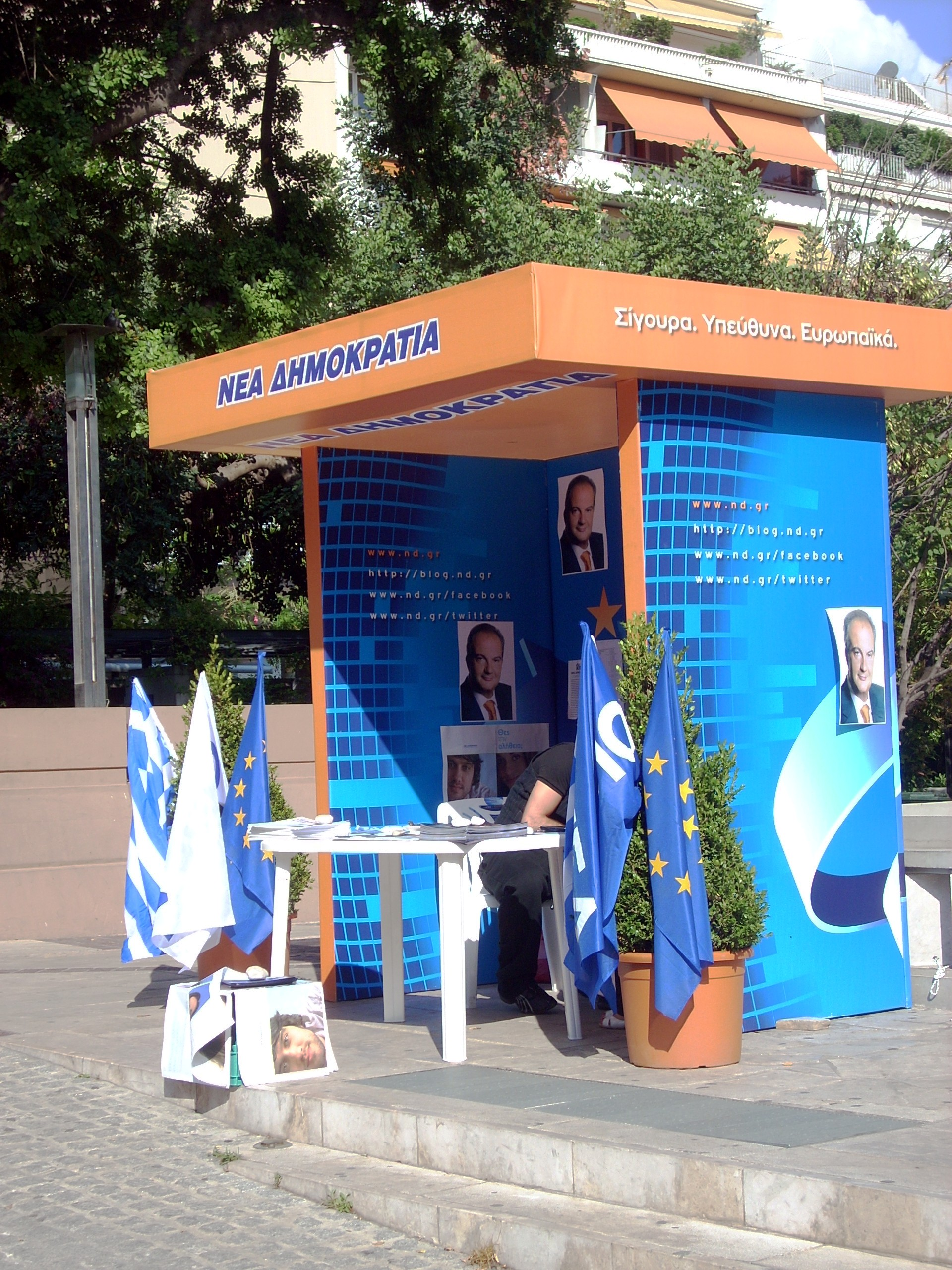
Kiosk of New Democracy in Athens for the 2009 Greek legislative election

On 2 September 2009 Karamanlis announced his intention to call an election, although one was not required until September 2011. The parliament was dissolved on 9 September, and the 2009 legislative election was held on 4 October. New Democracy's share of the parliamentary vote dropped to 33.47% (down by 8.37%) and they won only 91 of 300 seats, dropping by 61 since the last election. The rival PASOK soared to 43.92% (up 5.82%), and took 160 seats (up 58). The 33.5% tally marked a historic low for the party since its founding in 1974. Karamanlis conceded defeat and stated that he would resign as a leader of New Democracy, and would not stand as a candidate at the next party election. Two former Ministers for Foreign Affairs, Dora Bakoyannis and Antonis Samaras, as well as Thessaloniki Prefect Panagiotis Psomiadis were announced as candidates, with Samaras being the favorite to win.

On 29 November 2009, Antonis Samaras was elected the new leader of New Democracy by the party base at the 2009 leadership election. Following early results showing Samaras in the lead, his main rival Dora Bakoyannis conceded defeat and congratulated Samaras for his election; she later left New Democracy to found her own party, Democratic Alliance. Samaras himself had also left New Democracy in 1992 because of his hard stance on the Macedonia naming dispute and founded his own party (Political Spring), but had returned to New Democracy in 2004. Samaras shifted New Democracy to the right on issues such as immigration and security.

=== 2011 government debt crisis ===
New Democracy was in opposition during the first phase (2009–11) of the Greek government debt crisis which included the First bailout package agreed in May 2010. The party did not support the first EU/IMF rescue package of May 2010 and the three related austerity packages of March 2010, May 2010 and June 2011. Further measures were agreed by prime minister George Papandreou with the EU and private banks and insurers on 27 October 2011. The aim was to complete negotiations by the end of the year and put in place a full Second bailout package to supplement the one agreed in May 2010. Samaras initially blasted the deal. In reality New Democracy had dismissed cross-party agreement even before the deal was agreed.

A few days later, Papandreou announced a surprise referendum. During the frantic negotiations that followed, Samaras offered to support the austerity package he had initially condemned if Papandreou resigned and an interim government be appointed to lead the country to elections early in the new year.

The referendum was never held, and Papandreou resigned in early November 2011. New Democracy supported the new national unity government headed by Lucas Papademos; however the party's support for austerity appeared lukewarm at first.

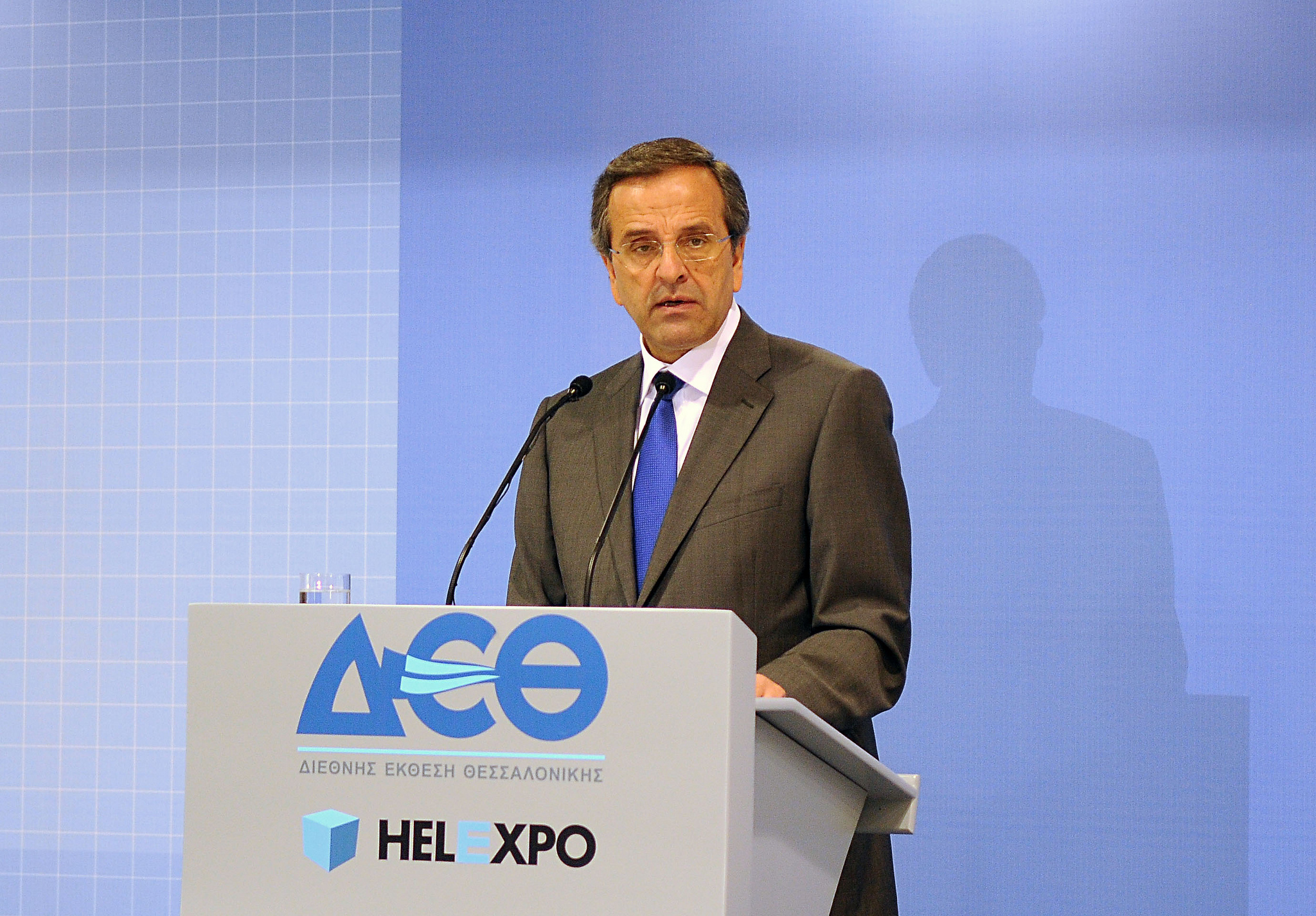
Prime Minister Antonis Samaras in 2012

Within a few days, party officials spoke of "renegotiating" existing agreements with the EU and IMF. EU partners requested that Samaras sign a letter committing him to the terms of the rescue package, in what was seen as an effort to keep the nationalist elements of his party happy. Samaras argued that his word should be enough and that the demand for a written commitment was "humiliating". Both Papademos and the EU insisted on a written commitment. New Democracy repeated its call for new elections. Samaras was said to be infuriating European leaders by only partly backing the international reform programme. A meeting of Eurozone's Finance Ministers was postponed in February 2012, when it became apparent that not all the main political parties were willing to pledge to honour the conditions demanded in return for the rescue package; a day later Samaras reversed course and wrote to the European Commission and IMF, promising to implement the austerity measures if his party were to win a general election in April. German finance minister Wolfgang Schäuble suggested postponing the election and setting up a small technocratic cabinet like Italy's to run Greece for the next two years.

Before the 2012 election, Adonis Georgiadis, Makis Voridis, and Thanos Plevris from the right-wing populist Popular Orthodox Rally joined New Democracy.

=== Fourth government with PASOK (2012–2015) ===
In May 2012 general election, New Democracy became the largest party but could not obtain a majority. Anti-austerity leftist SYRIZA, led by Alexis Tsipras, became the second largest party and refused to negotiate with New Democracy and PASOK. Voters once again took to the polls in the widely watched June 2012 election. New Democracy came out on top in a stronger position with 129 seats, compared to 108 in the May election. On 20 June 2012, Samaras successfully formed a coalition with PASOK and the Democratic Left (DIMAR).

New Democracy during its rule introduced a strict immigration policy, and proposed strengthening this policy as part of its political agenda. Samaras also implemented a series of reforms and austerity measures with the aim of reducing government budget deficits and making the Greek economy competitive. In 2013 he passed reform bills approving the layoff of 15,000 public employees, among them high school teachers, school guards and municipal policemen. At the same time, he cut value-added tax (VAT) in restaurants to 13 percent from 23 percent. He also passed a bill instituting the Single Property Tax and the auction of houses. The Minister of Administrative Reform and e-Governance Kyriakos Mitsotakis implemented an evaluation process on the public sector to locate surplus staff members.

Greece achieved a primary government budget surplus in 2013. In April 2014, Greece returned to the global bond market as it successfully sold €3 billion worth of five-year government bonds at a yield of 4.95%. Greece's credit rating was upgraded by Fitch from B− to B. Greece returned to growth after six years of economic decline in the second quarter of 2014, and was the eurozone's fastest-growing economy in the third quarter.

On healthcare, Minister for Health Adonis Georgiadis gave complete free pharmaceutical coverage to more than 2.000.000 uninsured citizens, with the cost being set at 340 million euros.

=== In opposition (2015–2019) ===
In its electoral campaign for the January 2015 legislative election, Samaras promised to continue with his plan to exit the bailout and return to growth by further privatizations, a corporate tax rate reduced to 15 percent and a recapitalization of Greece's banks. The party received a total of €747,214 of state funding, the largest share of all political parties in Greece. In the election, ND was defeated by SYRIZA. On 5 July 2015, Samaras stepped down from party leadership.

Vangelis Meimarakis took over from Samaras as an interim leader. In this capacity, he led the party into the snap election on 20 September 2015, at which New Democracy was defeated for a second time in nine months by SYRIZA. Meimarakis did, however, succeed in slightly increasing the ND vote share from 27.8% to 28.1%.

On 10 January 2016, Kyriakos Mitsotakis was elected as the new party leader. On 4 October 2018, the party adopted a new logo.

=== Fifth government (2019–present) ===
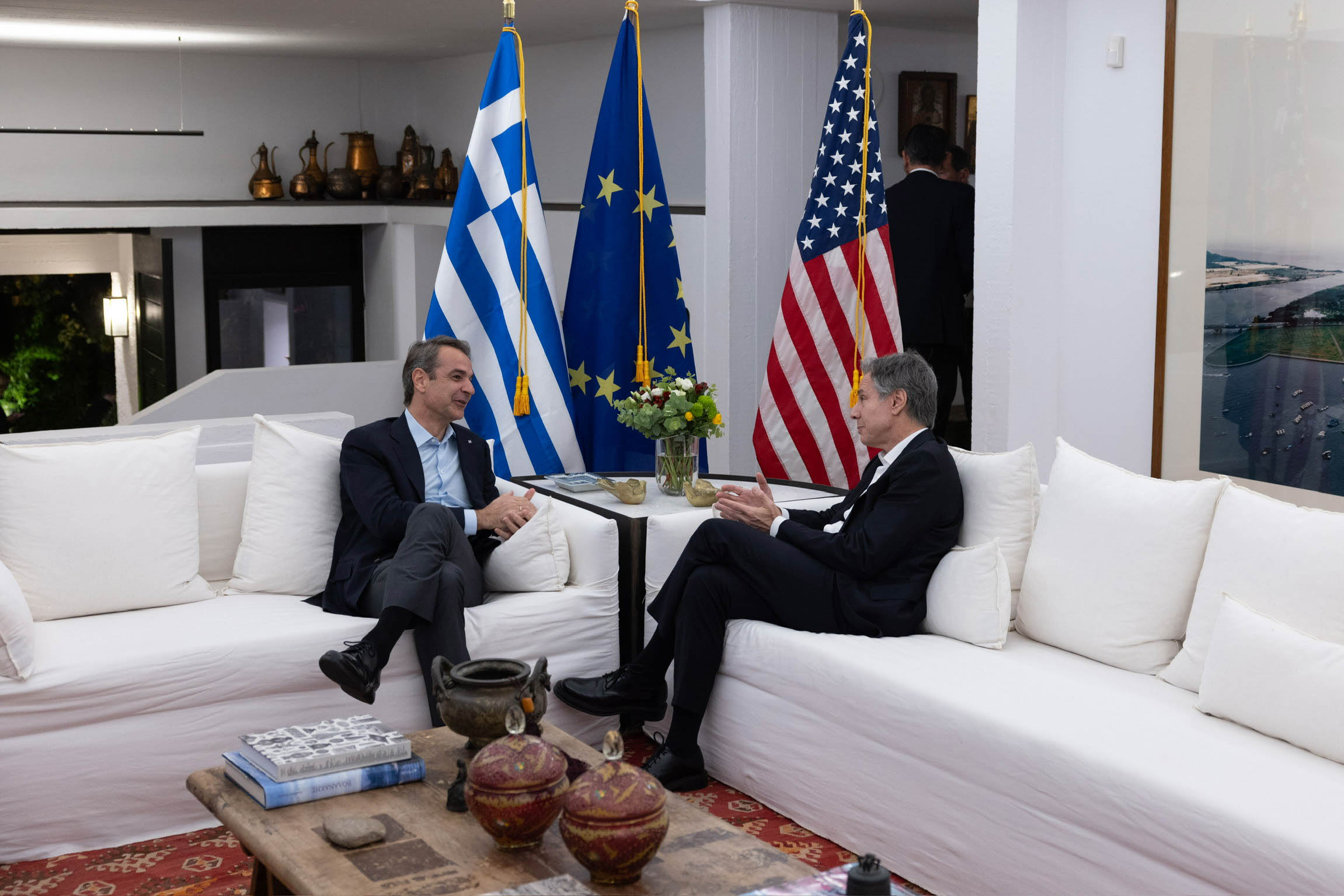
Mitsotakis with U.S. Secretary of State Antony Blinken in Crete, Greece, 6 January 2024

In the 2019 legislative election, New Democracy won 158 seats in the 300-seat Hellenic Parliament, a majority of the seats, enabling it to form a government on its own under Prime Minister Kyriakos Mitsotakis.

During the COVID-19 pandemic, Mitsotakis' efforts to deal with the prolonged lockdown in Greece received widespread praise from Greek and International press, analysts, and academics, for the well-structured approach and continuous reliance on scientific expertise of the Greek pandemic task force, headed by Sotiris Tsiodras. In 2021, the country managed to keep the new cases of COVID-19 to low levels by enforcing back to back strict lockdowns in Athens and Thessaloniki, and enabling different emergency protocols for rural areas. At the same time the government focused on tackling the pandemic before the launch of the 2021 summer tourist season in an attempt to boost the country's economy.

During Mitsotakis's first term as prime minister, he received praise for his pro-European and technocratic governance, his handling of the COVID-19 pandemic in Greece, and was credited with the modernization and digitalization of the country's public administration, as well as for his overall management of the Greek economy, with Greece being named the Top Economic Performer for 2022 and 2023 by The Economist. This was in particular due to Greece in 2022 being able to repay ahead of schedule the 2.7 billion euros ($2.87 billion) of loans owed to Eurozone countries under the first bailout it received during the decade-long debt crisis, along with being on the verge of reaching an investment-grade rating. Mitsotakis also received criticism, as during his term Greece experienced heightened corruption, and a deterioration of freedom of the press. His term was marred by the Novartis corruption scandal, the 2022 wiretapping scandal, and the Tempi Train crash. Additionally, he has received both praise and criticism for his handling of migration, including support and aid from the European Union, but criticism from journalists and activists for pushbacks, which his government has denied.

In the May 2023 elections, the only election to use the purely proportional system introduced by SYRIZA in 2016, Mitsotakis led the party to achieve a plurality of the seats in parliament. Soon after the results were announced, Mitsotakis called snap elections for the following month, with this election returning to the majority bonus system.

In his second term, Mitsotakis introduced landmark bills, focusing on the establishment of private academic institutions in Greece, as well as revisions to the tax and income systems. Additionally, legislation was proposed for same-sex marriage and adoption by same-sex couples, a move that was widely described as progressive. However, these initiatives faced significant opposition from right-wing and hard-right factions within the party, as well as the Greek Orthodox church, who openly expressed their disagreement with the proposed legislation. Despite the opposition, in February 2024, Greece became the first Orthodox Christian country to recognise same-sex marriage and adoption by same-sex couples.

In the 2024 European Parliament election, New Democracy came first, but ceded ground in terms of both popular vote and seats secured. In July 2025, the government implemented a three month suspension of asylum processing for migrants from North Africa, drawing criticism from human rights groups. The government also introduced a new law concerning those whose asylum claims have been rejected: they will have to choose between voluntarily deportation or jail sentences of two to five years, as well as fines of up to 10,000 euros ($11,600), if convicted of illegal entry and stay. In September 2025, the government announced sweeping tax cuts, focused on families with children and young people. In June 2026, the government passed legislation that would speed up deportations and allow the transfer of rejected asylum seekers to ‘return hubs’ outside the EU, in Africa. In November 2026, the government legislated another package of tax cuts and benefit increases.

== Ideology ==
New Democracy's political position has been placed as centrist, centre-right, with some far-right elements. The main ideologies of the party have been described as liberal-conservative, or conservative-liberal, and Christian democratic, with a pro-European stance. The party itself claims that its official ideology is social liberalism.

== Democratic Renewal Initiative – New Democracy Student Movement ==
The Democratic Renewal Initiative – New Democracy Student Movement (Greek: Δημοκρατική Ανανεωτική Πρωτοπορία – Νέα Δημοκρατική Φοιτητική Κίνηση), abbreviated as "Δ.Α.Π.–Ν.Δ.Φ.Κ.", is the student wing of New Democracy. It was founded in 1976, after the merger of the Democratic Renewal Initiative and the New Democracy Student Movement.

== Electoral history ==
=== Hellenic Parliament ===
Election	Hellenic Parliament					Rank	Government	Leader
Election	Votes	%	±pp	Seats won	+/−	Rank	Government	Leader
1974	2,669,133	54.37%	New	220 / 300	▲220	#1	Government	Konstantinos Karamanlis
1977	2,146,365	41.84%	−12.53	171 / 300	▼49	#1	Government	Konstantinos Karamanlis
1981	2,034,496	35.88%	−5.96	115 / 300	▼56	#2	Opposition	Georgios Rallis
1985	2,599,681	40.85%	+4.97	126 / 300	▲11	#2	Opposition	Constantine Mitsotakis
Jun 1989	2,887,488	44.28%	+3.43	145 / 300	▲19	#1	Coalition	Constantine Mitsotakis
Nov 1989	3,093,479	46.19%	+1.91	148 / 300	▲3	#1	Snap election	Constantine Mitsotakis
1990	3,088,137	46.89%	+0.70	150 / 300	▲2	#1	Government	Constantine Mitsotakis
1993	2,711,737	39.30%	−7.59	111 / 300	▼39	#2	Opposition	Constantine Mitsotakis
1996	2,586,089	38.12%	−1.18	108 / 300	▼3	#2	Opposition	Miltiadis Evert
2000	2,935,196	42.74%	+4.62	125 / 300	▲17	#2	Opposition	Kostas Karamanlis
2004	3,360,424	45.36%	+2.62	165 / 300	▲40	#1	Government	Kostas Karamanlis
2007	2,994,979	41.87%	−3.49	152 / 300	▼13	#1	Government	Kostas Karamanlis
2009	2,295,967	33.47%	−8.40	91 / 300	▼61	#2	Opposition	Kostas Karamanlis
May 2012	1,192,103	18.85%	−14.62	108 / 300	▲17	#1	Snap election	Antonis Samaras
Jun 2012	1,825,497	29.66%	+10.81	129 / 300	▲21	#1	Coalition	Antonis Samaras
Jan 2015	1,718,694	27.81%	−1.85	76 / 300	▼53	#2	Opposition	Antonis Samaras
Sep 2015	1,526,205	28.09%	+0.28	75 / 300	▼1	#2	Opposition	Vangelis Meimarakis
2019	2,251,411	39.85%	+11.76	158 / 300	▲83	#1	Government	Kyriakos Mitsotakis
May 2023	2,407,860	40.79%	+0.94	146 / 300	▼12	#1	Snap election	Kyriakos Mitsotakis
Jun 2023	2,114,780	40.56%	−0.23	158 / 300	▲12	#1	Government	Kyriakos Mitsotakis

=== European Parliament elections ===
European Parliament
Election	Votes	%	±pp	Seats won	+/−	Rank	Leader
1981	1,779,462	31.3%	New	8 / 24	▲8	#2	Georgios Rallis
1984	2,266,568	38.1%	+6.8	9 / 24	▲1	#2	Evangelos Averoff
1989	2,647,215	40.5%	+2.4	10 / 24	▲1	#1	Constantine Mitsotakis
1994	2,133,372	32.7%	−7.8	9 / 25	▼1	#2	Miltiadis Evert
1999	2,314,371	36.0%	+3.3	9 / 25	0	#1	Kostas Karamanlis
2004^{A}	2,633,961	43.0%	+4.7	11 / 24	▲2	#1	Kostas Karamanlis
2009	1,655,636	32.3%	−10.7	8 / 22	▼3	#2	Kostas Karamanlis
2014	1,298,713	22.7%	−9.6	5 / 21	▼3	#2	Antonis Samaras
2019	1,872,814	33.1%	+10.4	8 / 21	▲3	#1	Kyriakos Mitsotakis
2024	1,125,602	28.3%	−4.8	7 / 21	▼1	#1	Kyriakos Mitsotakis

^{A} 2004 results are compared to the combined totals for ND and POLAN totals in the 1999 election.

== Party leaders ==
#	Leader	Portrait	Term of office		Prime Minister
1	Konstantinos Karamanlis		4 October 1974	8 May 1980	1974–1980
2	Georgios Rallis		8 May 1980	9 December 1981	1980–1981
3	Evangelos Averoff		9 December 1981	1 September 1984	—
4	Konstantinos Mitsotakis		1 September 1984	3 November 1993	(Tzannetakis 1989); 1990–1993
5	Miltiadis Evert		3 November 1993	21 March 1997	—
6	Kostas Karamanlis		21 March 1997	30 November 2009	2004–2009
7	Antonis Samaras		30 November 2009	5 July 2015	2012–2015
–	Vangelis Meimarakis		5 July 2015	24 November 2015	—
–	Ioannis Plakiotakis (interim)		24 November 2015	10 January 2016	—
8	Kyriakos Mitsotakis		10 January 2016	Incumbent	2019–present

== Symbols ==
The traditional symbol of the party has been the freedom torch, incorporated in its logo, albeit in a stylized form in the logo adopted in 2018.

=== Logos ===
Party logo, 1978–2010

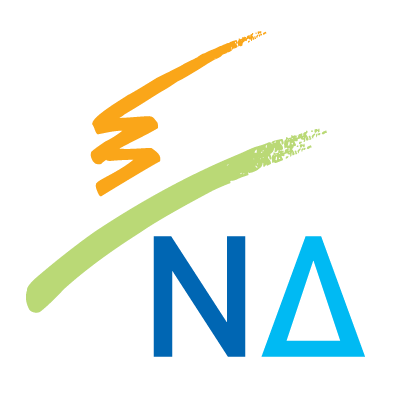
Party logo, 2010–2018

Current logo, since 2018
