= 2004 European Parliament election in Greece =

← 1999	13 June 2004	2009 →

24 seats in the European Parliament
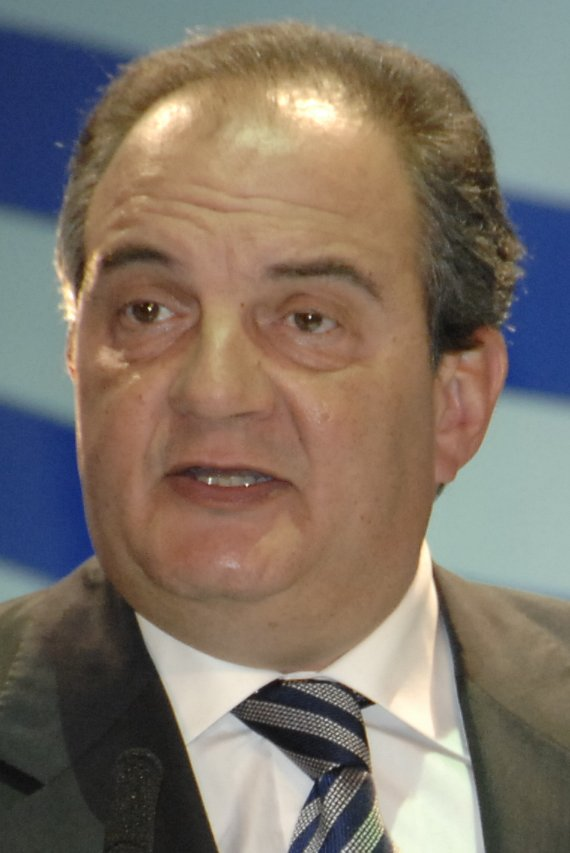

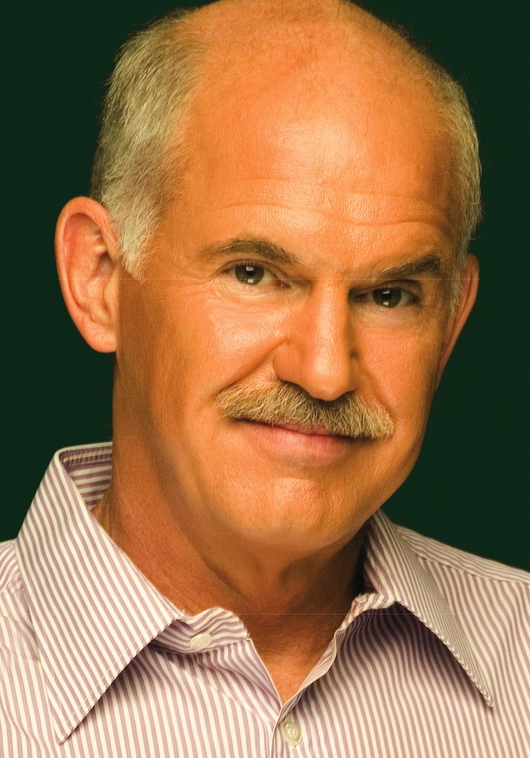

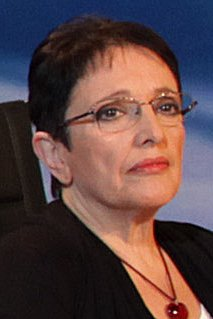

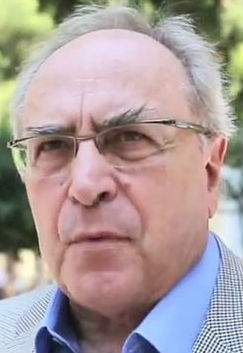

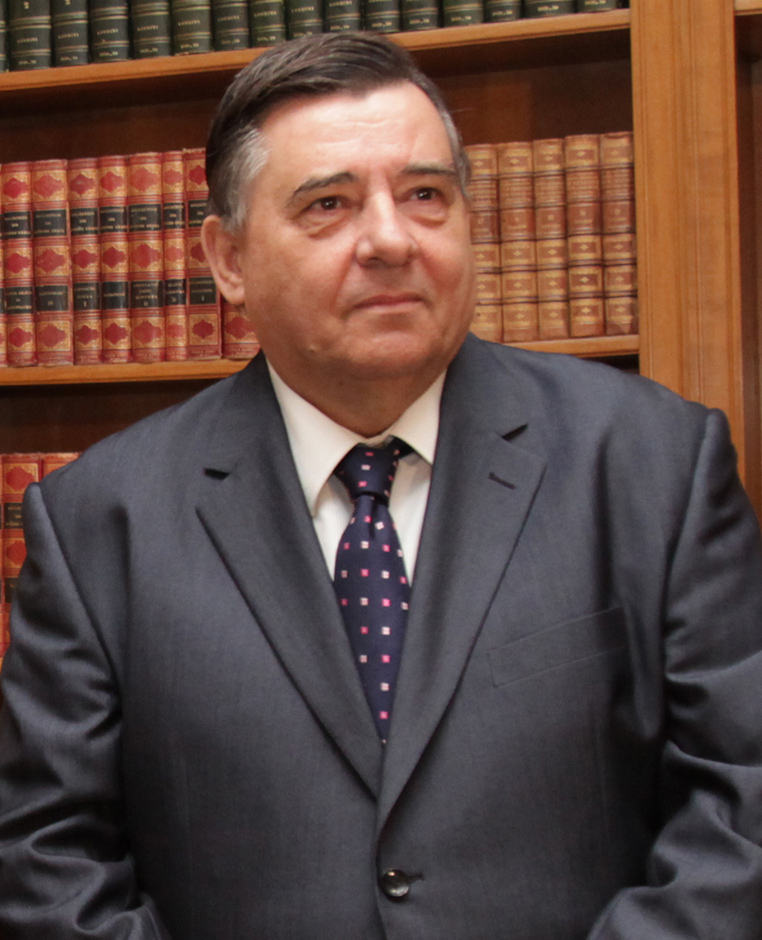
	Majority party	Minority party	Third party
Leader	Kostas Karamanlis	George Papandreou	Aleka Papariga
Party	ND—PA	PASOK	KKE
Last election	36.00%, 9 seats	32.91%, 9 seats	8.67%, 3 seats
Seats won	11	8	3
Seat change	▲2	▼1	Steady
Popular vote	2,633,574	2,083,327	580,396
Percentage	43.01%	34.03%	9.48%
Swing	▲7.01pp	▲1.12pp	▲0.81pp
	Fourth party	Fifth party
Leader	Nikos Konstantopoulos	Georgios Karatzaferis
Party	Synaspismos	LAOS
Last election	5.16%, 2 seats	–
Seats won	1	1
Seat change	▼1	New
Popular vote	254,447	252,429
Percentage	4.16%	4.12%
Swing	▼1.00pp	New

European Parliament elections were held in Greece on 13 June 2004 to elect 24 Greek members of the European Parliament. Members were elected by party-list proportional representation with a 3% electoral threshold.

== Results ==
The 2004 European election was the sixth election to the European Parliament. The ruling New Democracy party made strong gains, while the opposition PASOK made smaller gains, both at the expense of minor parties. The traditionalist Popular Orthodox Rally, contested in the election for the first time and elected one MEP.

Party	Votes	%	Seats	+/–
New Democracy—Political Spring	2,633,574	43.01	11	+2
PASOK	2,083,327	34.03	8	–1
Communist Party of Greece	580,396	9.48	3	0
Synaspismos	254,447	4.16	1	–1
Popular Orthodox Rally	252,429	4.12	1	New
Women for Another Europe	46,565	0.76	0	New
Democratic Regional Union	44,541	0.73	0	New
Ecologist Greens	40,873	0.67	0	0
Union of Centrists	34,511	0.56	0	0
Greek Ecologists	32,956	0.54	0	0
Marxist–Leninist Communist Party of Greece	21,220	0.35	0	0
Hellenic Front	15,243	0.25	0	0
Democratic Socialist Movement	13,627	0.22	0	New
Radical Left Front	13,387	0.22	0	0
Anti-Capitalist Coalition	11,938	0.19	0	0
Fighting Socialist Party of Greece	11,598	0.19	0	0
Patriotic Alliance	10,618	0.17	0	New
Rainbow	6,176	0.10	0	0
Vision	5,996	0.10	0	New
Organization for the Reconstruction of the Communist Party of Greece	5,090	0.08	0	0
European Confederacy	3,791	0.06	0	New
Alternative Ecologists	284	0.00	0	0
Christianity	45	0.00	0	0
Total	6,122,632	100.00	24	–1
Valid votes	6,122,632	97.44		
Invalid/blank votes	161,005	2.56		
Total votes	6,283,637	100.00		
Registered voters/turnout	9,938,863	63.22		
Source: Ministry of the Interior
