= 1981 European Parliament election in Greece =

- 18 October 1981

24 seats in the European Parliament

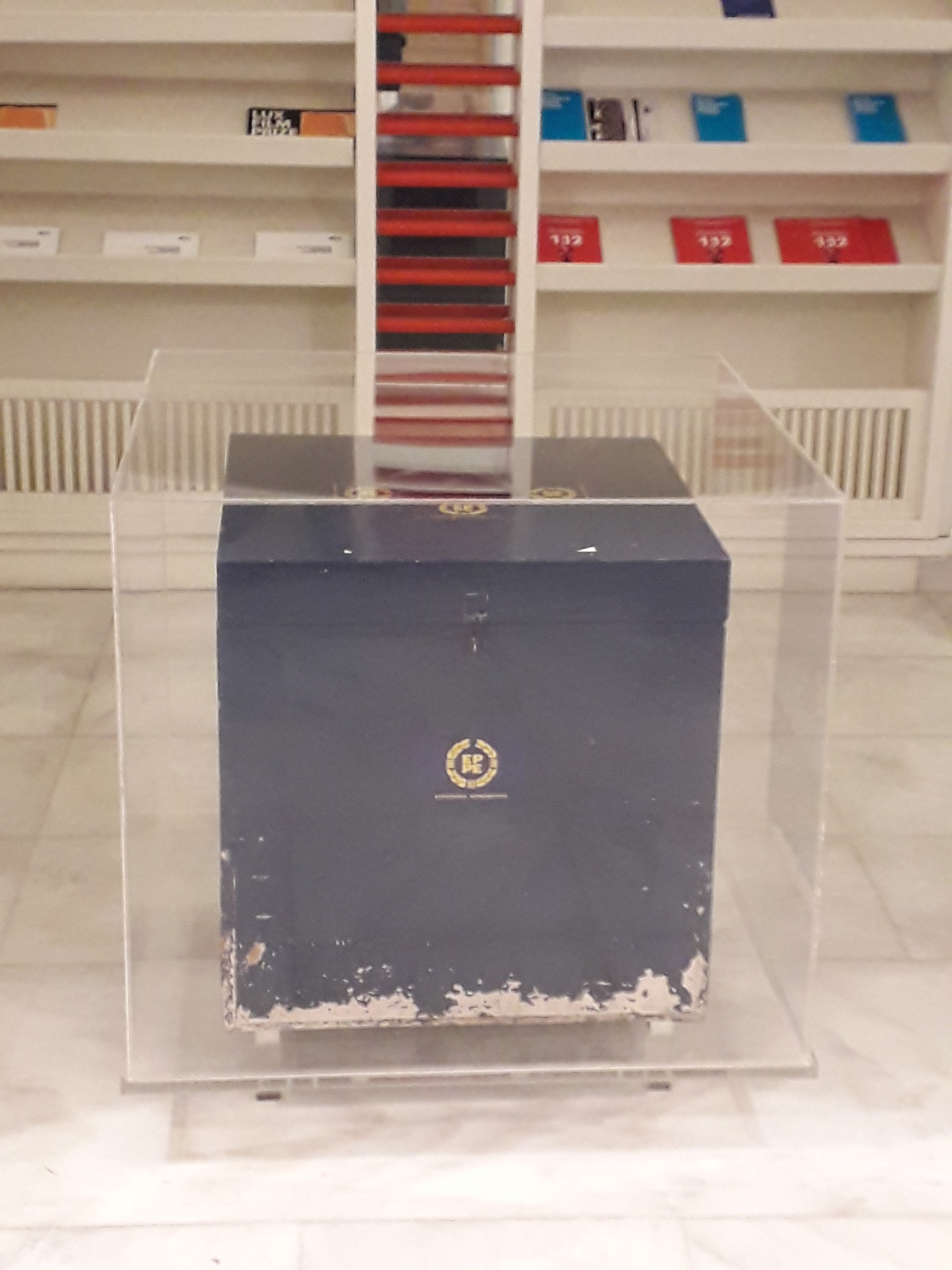
Ballot box used in the elections

European Parliament elections were held in Greece for the first time on 18 October 1981. The rest of the European Community voted in 1979 before Greece became a member state. Greece was allocated 24 seats in the Parliament.

== Results ==
Party	Votes	%	Seats
PASOK	2,278,030	40.12	10
New Democracy	1,779,462	31.34	8
Communist Party of Greece	729,052	12.84	3
Communist Party of Greece (Interior)	300,841	5.30	1
KODISO–KAE	241,666	4.26	1
Progressive Party	111,245	1.96	1
Christian Democracy	65,056	1.15	0
Union of the Democratic Centre	63,673	1.12	0
Liberal Party	59,141	1.04	0
Greek Reformers Movement	49,495	0.87	0
Total	5,677,661	100.00	24
Valid votes	5,677,661	98.70	
Invalid/blank votes	74,688	1.30	
Total votes	5,752,349	100.00	
Registered voters/turnout	7,329,409	78.48	
Source: Dinkaves

=== By region ===
Region	PASOK	ND	KKE	KKE-Es	KODISO
Attica	36.75	25.24	17.67	8.98	6.20
Central Greece	43.95	33.42	9.46	3.97	2.96
Central Macedonia	37.68	34.64	12.07	4.67	4.96
Crete	55.27	20.24	9.81	3.58	1.87
Eastern Macedonia and Thrace	38.59	36.28	7.45	3.50	6.21
Epirus	40.37	35.78	14.01	4.12	2.02
Ionian Islands	39.77	30.09	16.35	6.07	2.46
North Aegean	34.04	31.24	21.20	4.24	4.34
Peloponnese	37.64	40.69	8.27	3.67	3.20
South Aegean	47.00	32.38	6.08	2.95	3.18
Thessaly	39.37	31.37	15.83	3.89	3.06
Western Greece	46.66	32.04	9.93	4.02	2.12
Western Macedonia	37.63	39.37	9.07	3.24	3.48

== Elected MEPs ==
- List of members of the European Parliament for Greece, 1981–1984
