= 1994 European Parliament election in Greece =

- 12 June 1994

25 seats in the European Parliament
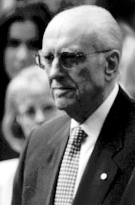

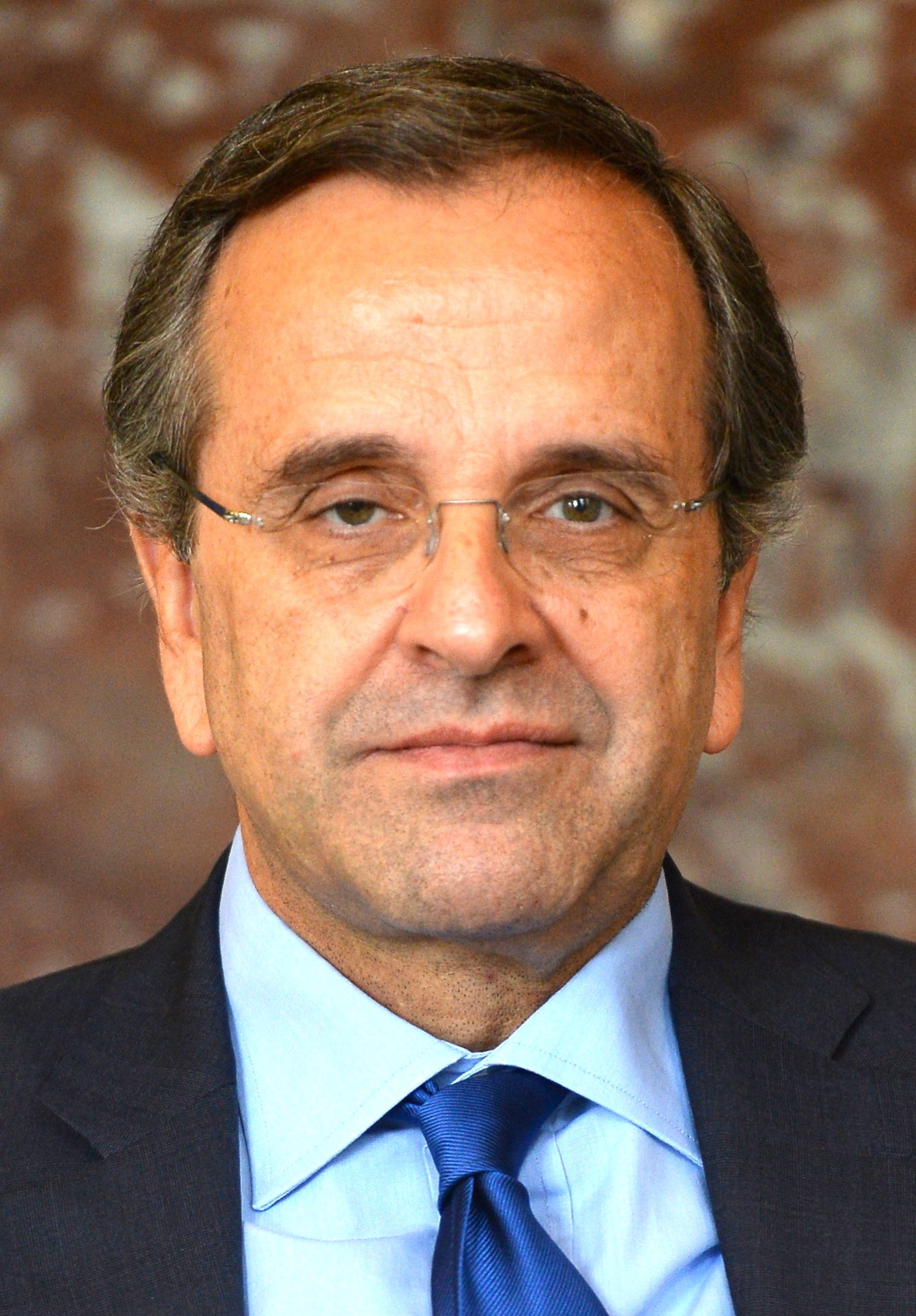

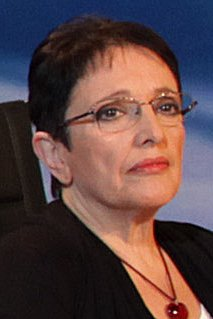

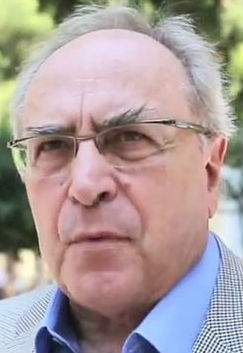
| | Majority party | Minority party | Third party |
|---|---|---|---|
| Leader | Andreas Papandreou | Miltiadis Evert | Antonis Samaras |
| Party | PASOK | ND | PA |
| Alliance | PES | EPP–ED | EDA |
| Last election | 35.96%, 9 seats | 40.41%, 10 seats | – |
| Seats won | 10 | 9 | 2 |
| Seat change | ▲1 | ▼1 | New |
| Popular vote | 2,458,619 | 2,133,372 | 564,778 |
| Percentage | 37.64% | 32.66% | 8.65% |
| Swing | ▲1.68pp | ▼7.75pp | New |
| | Fourth party | Fifth party |
| Leader | Aleka Papariga | Nikos Konstantopoulos |
| Party | KKE | Synaspismos |
| Alliance | GUE/NGL | GUE/NGL |
| Last election | (Note: Part of Synaspismos alliance) |
| Seats won | 2 | 2 |
| Seat change | – | – |
| Popular vote | 410,741 | 408,066 |
| Percentage | 6.29% | 6.25% |
| Swing | – | – |

European Parliament elections were held in Greece on 12 June 1994 to elect the 25 Greek members of the European Parliament. Members were elected by party-list proportional representation, with a 3% electoral threshold.

== Results ==
The 1994 European election was the fourth election to the European Parliament in which Greece participated. The ruling PASOK under the leadership of the aging Andreas Papandreou made gains against the opposition conservative New Democracy party. A new party Political Spring had left New Democracy and came in third ahead of the Communist Party of Greece and the Coalition of the Left and Progress which had contested the previous election in coalition. The parties on the left elected two MEPs each, the same result as 1989.

| Party | Votes | % | Seats | +/– |
|---|---|---|---|---|
| PASOK | 2,458,619 | 37.64 | 10 | +1 |
| New Democracy | 2,133,372 | 32.66 | 9 | –1 |
| Political Spring | 564,778 | 8.65 | 2 | New |
| Communist Party of Greece | 410,741 | 6.29 | 2 | – |
| Synaspismos | 408,066 | 6.25 | 2 | – |
| Democratic Renewal | 182,522 | 2.79 | 0 | 0 |
| Union of Centrists | 77,951 | 1.19 | 0 | New |
| National Party–National Political Union | 50,748 | 0.78 | 0 | 0 |
| Kollatos | 45,870 | 0.70 | 0 | New |
| Party of Greek Hunters | 41,157 | 0.63 | 0 | New |
| Union of Ecologists | 22,790 | 0.35 | 0 | New |
| Popular European Social Group | 18,648 | 0.29 | 0 | New |
| Political Ecologists | 17,017 | 0.26 | 0 | 0 |
| Left Movement Against the EEC | 14,007 | 0.21 | 0 | New |
| Marxist–Leninist Communist Party of Greece | 9,639 | 0.15 | 0 | New |
| Ecological Renaissance | 9,233 | 0.14 | 0 | New |
| Citizens Movement | 8,902 | 0.14 | 0 | New |
| Democratic Party | 7,908 | 0.12 | 0 | New |
| Golden Dawn | 7,264 | 0.11 | 0 | New |
| Organization for the Reconstruction of the Communist Party of Greece | 5,956 | 0.09 | 0 | New |
| European Federation Vision | 4,834 | 0.07 | 0 | New |
| Nationalist Support | 3,601 | 0.06 | 0 | New |
| Olympism | 3,153 | 0.05 | 0 | New |
| Autonomous Revolutionary Political Movement | 79 | 0.00 | 0 | 0 |
| Other parties | 25,736 | 0.39 | 0 | – |
| Total | 6,532,591 | 100.00 | 25 | +1 |
| Valid votes | 6,532,591 | 96.01 | | |
| Invalid/blank votes | 271,293 | 3.99 | | |
| Total votes | 6,803,884 | 100.00 | | |
| Registered voters/turnout | 9,550,596 | 71.24 | | |
Source: Ikaria

=== By region ===
| Region | PASOK | ND | POLAN | KKE | Syn |
|---|---|---|---|---|---|
| Attica | 34.68 | 30.17 | 8.20 | 7.59 | 9.07 |
| Central Greece | 40.88 | 35.02 | 7.76 | 4.89 | 4.57 |
| Central Macedonia | 35.89 | 35.61 | 9.04 | 5.72 | 5.09 |
| Crete | 52.63 | 26.26 | 5.80 | 4.20 | 5.86 |
| Eastern Macedonia and Thrace | 36.75 | 36.81 | 8.71 | 3.78 | 4.11 |
| Epirus | 37.42 | 34.98 | 8.29 | 6.17 | 6.28 |
| Ionian Islands | 38.26 | 29.31 | 8.07 | 9.83 | 6.97 |
| North Aegean | 35.64 | 28.42 | 6.88 | 11.61 | 5.76 |
| Peloponnese | 35.77 | 36.01 | 13.33 | 3.78 | 4.49 |
| South Aegean | 43.28 | 32.98 | 10.00 | 2.75 | 4.80 |
| Thessaly | 37.16 | 32.16 | 9.46 | 9.02 | 4.91 |
| Western Greece | 41.84 | 30.33 | 8.07 | 5.22 | 4.63 |
| Western Macedonia | 36.61 | 38.09 | 8.22 | 4.97 | 4.21 |
