= Tombras =

Tombras or Tobras (Greek: Τόμπρας, translit. Tompras, transcr. & pronounced Tombras or Tobras) is a Greek surname. It can refer to:

== People ==
- Charles P. Tombras, Sr. (1914–1990) - American advertiser and founder of Tombras Group, headquartered in Knoxville, Tennessee
- Charles P. Tombras, Jr. - American advertiser, son of Charles Tombras, Sr. above; decorated American Vietnam War officer and current CEO of Tombras Group
- Constantine D. Tombras - Greek Army officer in the Greek Expeditionary Force (Korea), awarded the Silver Star by the United States of America for gallantry at Koyangdae (Goyangdae), near the 38th Parallel on 2 March 1952 in the Korean War
- Georgios Tombras, alias "Roupakias" - Greek Army officer originally from Kydonies (Aivali) in Asia Minor, guerrilla leader in the Macedonian Struggle and participant in the First Balkan War
- George S. Tombras, Ph.D. - Greek physicist, electrical engineer and computer scientist, president of the faculty of physics at the National and Capodistrian University of Athens; noted for research in Weibull fading and communications technology
- Konstantinos Tombras - Greek printer originally from Kydonies (Aivali) in Asia Minor; moved to Nafplio and established first printing press in Greece and helped establish new presses elsewhere in the country
- Kyriakos Tobras - Greek business executive, activist investor and financial commentator; director of energy company Dimoil, SA
- Kyriakos Tombras - Greek lawyer and director of Ypervasi ("Overcoming") debt relief agency
- Theophanes Tombras (1932–1996) - Greek Army officer from Merbaka (Agias Trias), later deputy director (1981–84) and then general manager (1984–1989) of the Hellenic Telecommnunications Organization
- Spyros Tombras, Ph.D. (1928–2011) - Greek violinist in the State Orchestra of Athens and various chamber orchestras, professor of violin and chamber music at the Odeion of Athens and the Odeion of Attica; spouse of Chara Tombras-Lagopati, pianist and, together with her late husband, member of the Tombras Duo.

== Places ==
- Ano Tombra - Greek: Άνω Τόμπρα, "Above Tombras", i.e. "Upper Tombras", a settlement near Gytheio in Laconia; since 1955 officially called Προφήτης Ηλίας Μυρσίνης (Profitis Elias Mursinis, "Prophet Elias of Myrsini)
- Kato Tombra - Greek: Κάτω Τόμπρα, "Below Tombras", i.e. "Lower Tombras", a settlement near Gytheio in Laconia; near Ano Tombra, above
- (Odos) Stratigou Tombra - Greek: Στρατηγού Τόμπρα, "The Street of General Tombras"; a street in Agia Paraskevi, Attica, greater Athens
  - Stasi Tombra - Greek: Στάση Τόμπρα, "Tombras Station", a bus station nearby on Mesogeion Avenue
- Tombras Avenue - a street in East Ridge, Tennessee
- Tombras Village - a condo hotel in Paralia Demonias, Laconia

== Other uses ==
- Tombras Group, an American advertising agency
