= Charilaos Florakis =

Greek communist politician

- Χαρίλαος Φλωράκης
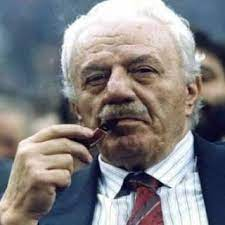

General Secretary of the Communist Party of Greece
- In office 20 December 1972 – 11 July 1989
- Preceded by: Konstantinos Koligiannis
- Succeeded by: Grigoris Farakos

President of Synaspismos
- In office 8 April 1989 – 18 March 1991
- Preceded by: Position established
- Succeeded by: Maria Damanaki

Personal details
- Born: 20 July 1914 Paliozoglopi (near Karditsa), Greece
- Died: 22 May 2005 (aged 90) Athens, Greece
- Resting place: Ai Lias Hill, Paliozoglopi
- Party: Communist Party of Greece
- Other political affiliations: Synaspismos
- Spouse: Magda Anagnostaki (m. 1976; died 1984)

Charilaos Florakis (also Harilaos Florakis; Greek: Χαρίλαος Φλωράκης; 20 July 1914 – 22 May 2005) was a leader of the Communist Party of Greece (KKE).

== Early life ==
Florakis was born on 20 July 1914 in the village of Paliozoglopi, located near Agrafa in the Itamos municipality, in the Karditsa Prefecture, Greece. He was the fourth of six children. He joined the Communist Party of Greece in 1941. He was an EAM-ELAS partisan during the resistance to the Nazi occupation in World War II, under the nom de guerre Yotis, starting as a captain and later being promoted to major. Florakis was on the losing side of the Greek Civil War that followed the liberation of the country, and subsequently left the country.

== After the Civil War ==
On his return to Greece in 1954 he was arrested and sentenced to life in prison. During his life he spent 18 years in detention or jail - including being put in internal exile by the Greek colonels in the beginning of the 1967-74 military dictatorship.

First elected to parliament in 1974 after the Metapolitefsi, Florakis led KKE as its general secretary from 1972 until 1989, when, though still fit for the job, he announced his decision to step down from the party's top post and proposed Grigoris Farakos as his successor.

== The Synaspismos era ==
Florakis did not retire from politics, however. In the same year, he retired from the leadership of the KKE. He was approved as the president of the newly founded Synaspismos or Coalition of the Left. Synaspismos was an attempt to reconcile Greece's two main communist factions, which arose in 1968 out of the Soviet intervention in Czechoslovakia that crushed the Prague Spring. That show of brute strength led many Greek communists to break with the Moscow-oriented KKE and join one of the emerging factions.

=== Foundation ===
Synaspismos was created partly at the instigation of Florakis and drew members from both the KKE and the KKE-Interior Eurocommunists. It also became an umbrella for other leftist groups and disaffected supporters of the Panhellenic Socialist Movement of Andreas Papandreou, which lost the general election in 1989.

=== Catharsis ===
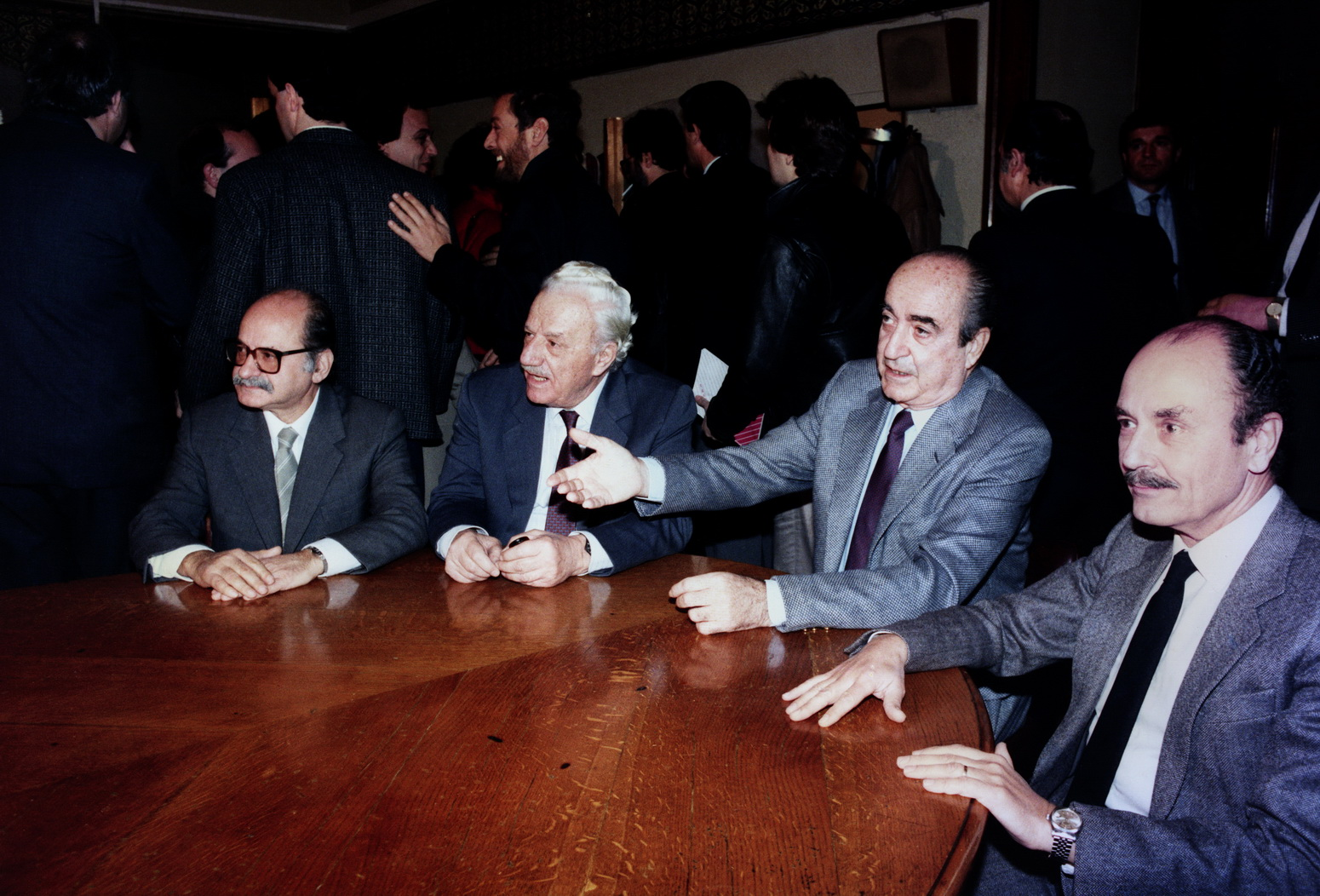
Four Greek politicians (L-R: Leonidas Kyrkos, Charilaos Florakis, Mitsotakis, Konstantinos Stephanopoulos) discuss a time after the Papandreou indictment for the Koskotas scandal. Papandreou called them the "gang of four."

In July 1989, Florakis decided to collaborate with conservatives led by Constantine Mitsotakis, which was extraordinary for Greek society since the wounds of the Greek Civil War were still fresh, mainly due to the political polarization by Papandreou in the 1980s. The participation of Synaspismos in the government also marked the end of the long history of militarized politics in Greece since there was no reaction from the military. This collaboration lasted for a few months until the investigations of the corruption scandals of Papandreou's government were completed and Papandreou was indicted for Koskotas scandal.

=== Post-soviet union era ===
In 1991, as it became increasingly clear that Soviet communism would not last, a rift arose within the KKE between those who supported continuing efforts towards a reconciliation with the Euro-communists through Synaspismos, and orthodox communists who felt that communism was threatened internationally and favoured a return to ideological roots. Florakis sided with the latter and at the 13th KKE conference in early 1991 —even before the fall of Mikhail Gorbachev and the dissolution of the Soviet Union— the party officially withdrew all support from Synaspismos and Florakis was elected honorary president of the KKE.

== Death ==
Florakis died of heart failure at his home in Athens on 22 May 2005. Florakis' body lay in state at the KKE headquarters in Perissos on May 24–25 where thousands of party members and sympathisers queued to pay their respects. Party leader Aleka Papariga addressed a civil funeral on the evening of May 25 which was attended by the President of Greece Karolos Papoulias, prime minister Kostas Karamanlis, parliament speaker Anna Benaki-Psarouda, opposition PASOK party leader George Papandreou, Left Coalition leader Alekos Alavanos, Cypriot communist party AKEL leader and Cyprus parliament speaker Dimitris Christofias, many ministers and MPs and other dignitaries. He was interred on May 26 at the Agios Ilias cemetery in his native village.

== Personal life ==
Despite being the leader of a communist party, Florakis believed in God and, during his final years, visited Mount Athos. He even confessed his sins to a priest at the offices of the KKE.

== Awards ==
Florakis received many awards during his lifetime for his multiple achievements and political activities:

- Order of Friendship of Peoples, from the Supreme Soviet of the Soviet Union
- Order of Karl Marx, from the German Democratic Republic
- Dimitrov Prize, from the People's Republic of Bulgaria
- Order of Lenin, from the Central Committee of the Communist Party of the Soviet Union in 1984

Party political offices
Preceded by Konstantinos Koligiannis	General Secretary of the Communist Party of Greece; 1972–1989	Succeeded by Grigoris Farakos
New title	Chairman of Synaspismos; 1989–1991	Succeeded by Maria Damanaki
