= Theofanis Tombras =

Greek soldier

- Θεοφάνης Τόμπρας
- Born: 1932; Merbaka
- Died: 8 January 1996 (aged 63–64)
- Occupations: Military officer, corporate executive, public administrator, business owner
- Employer: OTE
- Known for: Military and business leadership, political scandal
- Title: Colonel, Deputy Governor, Governor, General Director
- Political party: PASOK

Theofanis Tombras (Greek: Θεοφάνης Τόμπρας, translit. Theophanes Tompras, transcr. Theofanis Tombras or Tobras, 1932 – 8 January 1996) was a Greek Army officer (colonel of signals) who ended up as deputy governor of Hellenic Telecommunications Organization S.A (OTE) (1981–1984) and finally governor and general manager of OTE (1984–1989). During his tenure, OTE became the highest-revenue state-owned enterprise in Greece. He also oversaw the completion of its large complex in Marousi and the relocation of its operations there.

He was also engaged in other businesses, and became a manufacturer, with fruit processing facilities in Argolis.

== Life ==
Theofanis Tombras was born in 1932 in Merbaka (Agia Trias) in Argolis. He graduated from the Hellenic Military Academy and joined the Signal Corps. In the 1960s, as a captain, he served in the predecessor agency to the Hellenic National Intelligence Service and was accused of being a member of the clandestine ASPIDA organization, an accusation of which he was eventually absolved, as he was of accusations of wiretapping the telephone conversations of political opponents of Andreas Papandreou.

He took part in the resistance to the Greek military junta. After the electoral victory of PASOK in October 1981, he was made a deputy governor of OTE; later in February 1984, he became its governor. After amendments to its articles of organization in 1987, his title was changed to general director.

Under his direction, a signal effort began in the area of telephone modernization, and when it was recognized by his rivals even while they pointed out a certain concern for the reputation of the organization, they were considerably pleased by the reasoning behind the work being done. However, at certain times he was accused of high-handedness. He took the law into his own hands, to the detriment of the first president of OTE Tasos Mandelis, when he summoned the Governing Board of OTE and had a loaded pistol placed on the boardroom table, and although he arranged for armed bodyguards who were not police (as is often the case for plain-clothes bodyguards in Greece), they themselves were of dubious origin. The display of force was viewed at the time as a publicity stunt designed to intimidate journalists

He maintained a public friendship with the prime minister Andreas Papandreou, had a slight connection to well-known billionaire Sokratis Kokkalis, and with the reporters Nikos Kakaounakis (editor of the newspaper To Kalami) and Makis Kouris (editor of the Avriani). Indeed, To Kalami had published on numerous occasions transcripts of cassettes that contained personal conversations of Constantine Karamanlis, and the New Democracy party had denounced Tombras as the source of those cassettes.

== 1989 ==
Tombras was cast out of the general directorship of OTE on 2 July 1989, that is, the same day that a new cabinet under Tzannis Tzannetakis came to power.

After the return of the PASOK government in the summer of 1989, Tombras was accused of making deposits totaling a then-Greek drachma equivalent of $12.5 million USD in OTE money in the Bank of Crete at below-market interest to help shore up the bank's finances, allegedly part of a scheme known as the Koskotas scandal. Subsequently, he was accused of illegal telephone wiretapping by the political opponents of PASOK. On the first charge, he was acquitted, and on the second, he did not arrive in court because parliament dismissed the prosecution after the acquittal of Andreas Papandreou in the Koskotas affair and the dramatic change in the political climate in January 1992.

== Death ==
Tombras spent the last years of his life in his native Argolis, where he engaged in the fruit-processing trade, which he had originally entered in 1982. For all that, he remained active in the affairs of PASOK, especially in view of the succession of Andreas Papandreou in late 1995, where he supported Gerasimos Arsenis. He died of cardiac arrest on 8 January 1996; at the same time Andreas Papandreou was ill and being treated at the Onaseio Cardiac Centre. His funeral was attended by then-Speaker of the Parliament of Greece Apostolos Kaklamanis; then-Minister of Public Order Sifis Valirakis; then-Director of the Greek National Intelligence Service, Admiral Leonidas Vasilikopoulos; PASOK parliamentarians and party members, and Sokratis Kokkalis.
