= Koskotas scandal =

Greek corruption and financial scandal in 1989

Koskotas scandal (Greek: σκάνδαλο Κοσκωτά) was a Greek corruption and financial scandal in 1988–1989 centered on George Koskotas, owner of the Bank of Crete and mass media magnate, implicating the highest-ranking members of the Greek government, including Prime Minister Andreas Papandreou. The scandal marked the end of Papandreou's era of populist rule, during which he had tightly controlled the state apparatus since 1981.

Koskotas began working at the Bank of Crete in 1979 and quickly accumulated wealth by falsifying bank records. By 1985, he had purchased the bank and used it to build a growing media empire. His rise drew scrutiny, as investigations into rapid media ownership changes in the mid-1980s raised suspicions among publishers and the judiciary. To evade prosecution, he fled to the United States, where authorities arrested him on unrelated fraud charges in 1987. From prison, Koskotas claimed in interviews that more than US$200 million missing from his bank had been embezzled with the help of several government ministers and even Papandreou. In exchange, he used his media outlets to support Papandreou's socialist party (PASOK), even acquiring conservative newspapers critical of Papandreou. The allegations sparked international attention and political turmoil. Further investigations uncovered widespread corruption within PASOK, deepening the public's disillusionment. Papandreou responded by introducing laws to stall the inquiry and used the state monopoly over the media to contain the scandal.

Papandreou lost the June 1989 elections, owing much to the scandal. However, no single political party formed a government independently, a consequence of Papandreou's electoral law change just before the elections, intended to prevent the opposition from coming to power. The political gridlock led to an unexpected collaboration between conservative New Democracy and united leftist parties under Synaspismos to form a government with a limited mandate to carry out the investigations into PASOK's corruption that became known as catharsis. This collaboration was extraordinary for Greek society since they were on opposite sides in the Greek Civil War (1946–1949). However, political polarization reached its peak when the Parliament indicted Papandreou along with four of his ministers. Concurrently, a series of terrorist attacks and assassinations took place, aimed at intimidating both the public and politicians.

Koskotas was extradited to Greece in 1991 for the trial, which lasted nine months, with live broadcasts dominating the daily news cycles and public discourse. At the end of the trial, Koskotas and Papandreou's ministers were found guilty, while Papandreou was acquitted by one vote. Koskotas was sentenced to 25 years in prison, while the ministers received prison sentences. The trial became a landmark event in modern Greek history.

== Greece in the 1980s ==
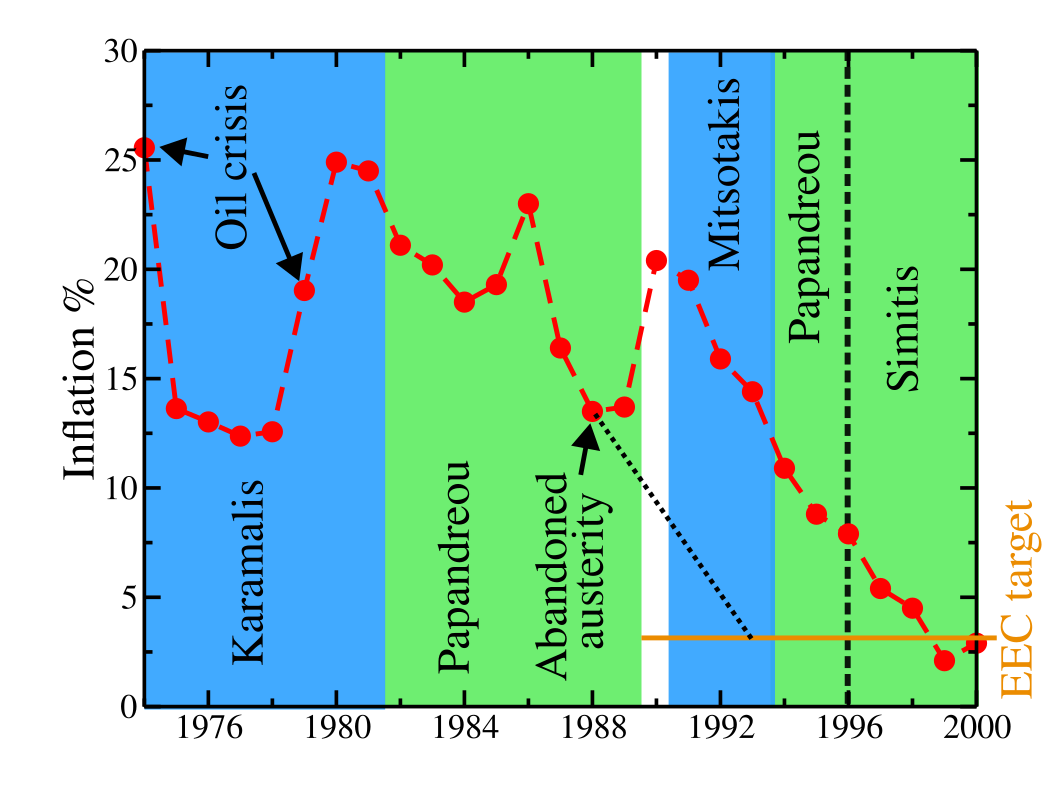
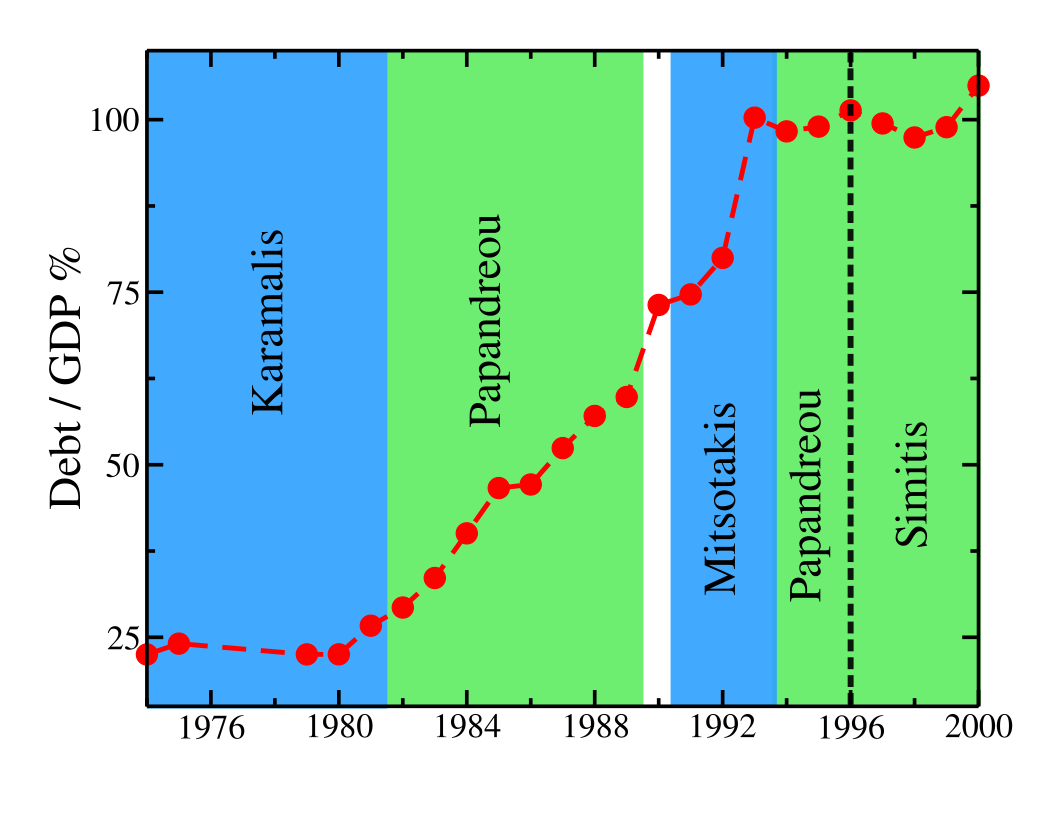
(Left) Greek inflation (%) in 1974–2000 period. In 1987, Papandreou abandoned the austerity measures (the dotted line estimates inflation if he had not) and delayed the convergence of the Greek economy with EEC criteria by more than four years. The 1980–2000 dataset is from the International Monetary Fund website , the 1974–1979 dataset is from the AMECO Database . (Right) Greek debt over GDP (%) in the 1974–2000 period. In 1981, Papandreou changed the course of the economy by making it more dependable on foreign borrowing. The dataset is from the International Monetary Fund website . The colored regions approximately highlight the prime minister's reigns; for 1989–1990, there was no stable government due to Papandreou's change in electoral law.

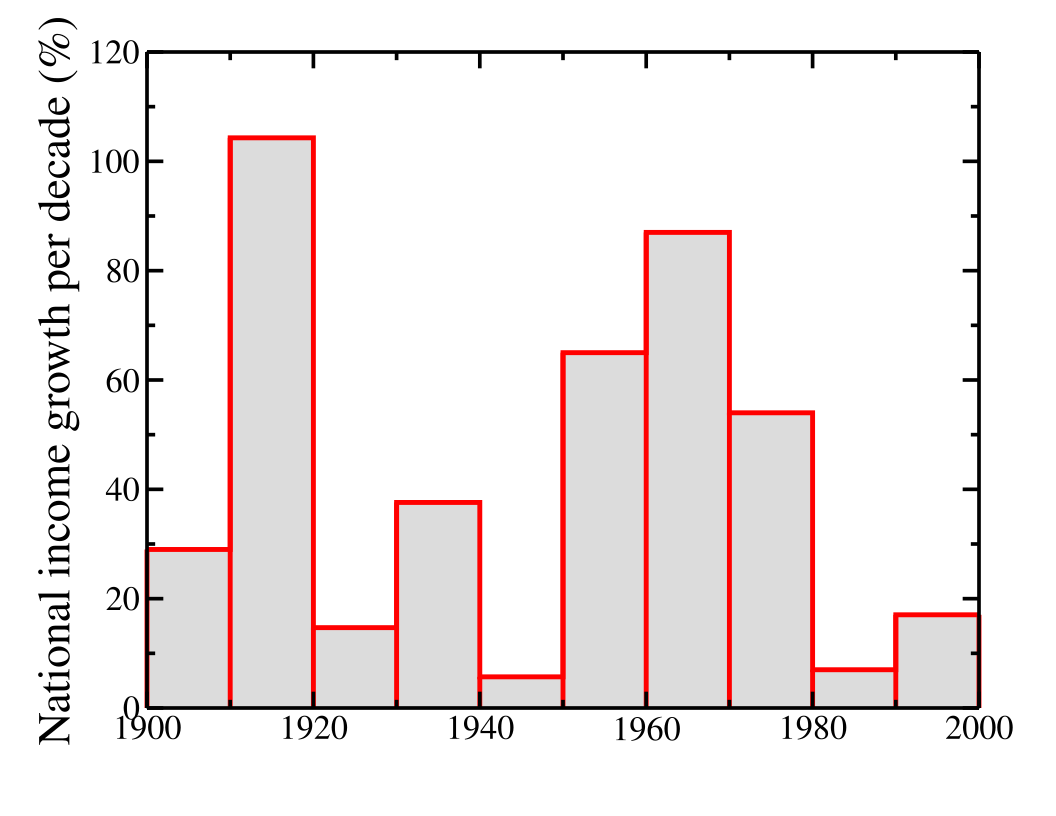
Greek National Income per decade for 1900–2000. During Papandreou's tenure from 1981 to 1989, national income increased at approximately the same rate as during the turbulent decade of 1941–1950. Source: The Bank of Greece and National Statistical Service, various open source bulletins and reports.

The Third Hellenic Republic was established in 1974 during a turbulent time in Greece, following the collapse of a seven-year Colonels' dictatorship (1967–1974) due to its mishandling of the Turkish invasion of Cyprus. The former prime minister Konstantinos Karamanlis returned from exile and laid the foundations for the new republic with the Constitution of 1975. During the same period, the Greek economy, which had outperformed in the previous two decades (1950–1973), began to slow down. Moreover, the oil crisis of the 1970s caused a spike in inflation, and Greek companies faced increased competition upon the country's entry into the European Market once it joined in 1981.

Amidst the economic difficulties, the opposition leader Andreas Papandreou adopted populist rhetoric, which resonated with the Greek people who sought a change from the politics of the past; Papandreou was campaigning on an anti-American, anti-European Economic Community (EEC), and anti-NATO stance. In 1980, Karamanlis became President of Greece, leaving a power vacuum that led to Papandreou becoming Greece's first socialist prime minister, after decades of conservative rule. The cohabitation of the two men in the 1981–1985 period was successful, as Papandreou adopted a more pragmatic approach, shifting away from his earlier rhetoric. His administration enacted ambitious social reforms by expanding access to education and healthcare, and strengthening workers' and women's rights, and sought national reconciliation after the Greek Civil War (1946–1949). However, Papandreou's economic policies exacerbated the structural issues in the Greek economy through excessive foreign borrowing to build an extensive patronage network and misuse of EU funds. Additionally, his soft stance on terrorism had increased the terrorism incidents in Greece.

In 1985, Papandreou provoked a constitutional crisis by denying Karamanlis a second presidential term and supporting Supreme Court Justice Christos Sartzetakis. He also proposed constitutional amendments aimed at increasing the power of his position by weakening the presidential powers, which had served as checks and balances on the executive branch. The election of the new president took place under a tense and confrontational atmosphere due to Papandreou's dubious constitutional procedures. Sartzetakis' election helped Papandreou and his socialist party, PASOK, to secure victory in the 1985 general elections and consolidate his power as "parliamentary autocrat."

By the end of the decade, Greece's economy was burdened by debt that had nearly tripled in size, rising from 26.7% of GDP in 1981 to 73.3% of GDP in 1990. The country also faced high inflation rates, which fluctuated between 13% and 23% from 1981 to 1989, along with rising unemployment from 2.7% in 1980 to 8% in 1988, chronic primary budget deficits, and large government expenditures, some intended to keep failed companies afloat, all of which strained the economy. At the same time, press reports of corruption within PASOK's government were being reported, with there being over 200 scandals in the late 1980s. Notable among these were the Yugoslav corn scandal and the mass scale surveillance scandal. However, Papandreou became embroiled in the Koskotas scandal, which overshadowed all other PASOK scandals.

== Koskotas' rise ==
=== Early years ===
Koskotas was born in Athens in 1954 to parents of limited means. In 1969, at the age of 15 and following his parents, he left Greece for the US to work as a worker renovating houses at his father's business. He attended Fordham University and Lehman College in New York. During his 10-year stay in the US, Koskotas gained a reputation for deception offenses involving the forgery of signatures, academic records, and the assumption of false identities, with an official record of 64 offenses.

=== Bank of Crete ===
On 3 July 1979, Koskotas joined the Bank of Crete's financial administration department, which consisted of the accounting and computing sections. He was rapidly promoted to different positions, gaining access to the inner parts of the bank. From 18 July 1980 onwards, Koskotas started misappropriating large amounts of the bank's money into his accounts; some of the embezzled money was used to buy shares of the Bank of Crete, primarily from the major shareholder at the time, Ioannis Karras. Increasingly, he could change personnel with loyal people and execute his directives without question. By 18 January 1985, Koskotas had gained complete control of the Bank by becoming President of the Bank's board and executive director. Between 1984 and 1989, Koskotas tripled the number of Bank of Crete branches both in Greece and abroad while also making significant acquisitions, including the historic and luxurious Hotel Grande Bretagne, located near the Parliament. The rapid accumulation of wealth and its display caught the attention of the press, which dubbed him the "Donald Trump of Greece."

=== Mass media empire ===
In 1982, Koskotas founded the mass media company 'Grammi' (Greek: Γραμμή) and became chairman of the board in the following year. He had complete control of the company shortly after, forcing the founding members and major shareholders to withdraw. He created SKY 100.4 radio station, which would later evolve into Skai Group. Koskotas continued to strengthen his influence in the Greek media by acquiring the two largest conservative newspapers, Kathimerini from Helen Vlachos in May 1987 and Vradyni in June 1988. Both newspapers had been critical of Papandreou's policies until their acquisition by Koskotas. Effectively, Koskotas had embezzled substantial amounts from the bank's clients and used them to build a mass media empire that exclusively supported PASOK.

== Scandal unravelled ==
=== Early investigation ===
==== First suspicions ====
George Koskotas had, in a short time, acquired several newspapers and magazines, a radio station, and one of the top soccer teams, Olympiacos F.C., in the mid-80s. Publishers became suspicious of the rapid changes in the media landscape and started investigating where Koskotas was finding all this money, as well as his close relationship with Papandreou and some of PASOK's ministers. Publishers began to make public their findings from investigations on Koskotas' past, and Koskotas responded by suing them for defamation. Moreover, it became apparent that Koskotas had help from the PASOK government in overcoming bureaucratic barriers to expand his media empire and the government resisted demands for an investigation, which started to intensify after Koskotas took over the Bank of Crete in 1985.

==== White House dinner ====
In October 1987, Koskotas was invited to a dinner by Ronald Reagan at the White House, but at the event, Secret Service discovered that Koskotas was under a six-year-old federal indictment for some of his crimes committed when he was living in the US until 1979, and they arrested him. He was released on bail of one million dollars, but his passport was withheld pending trial. Koskotas went to the Greek embassy, accompanied by Alexis Papahelas, who at the time was a journalist in Grammi, and requested documentation to return to Greece by claiming that he had lost his passport. Upon his return to Greece, Koskotas attempted to buy more mass media companies in response to publishers' requests for judicial investigation.

==== Assistance from PASOK ====
The negative publicity of Koskotas and rumors caused depositors of the Bank of Crete to withdraw their money, causing liquidity concerns. At that point, Ioannis Palaiokrassas, who was a member of the parliamentary committee inquiring into the Koskotas affair, stated, "We know that in the summer of 1988, during which Koskotas met with the prime minister at least once, large sums of money were deposited with the Bank of Crete by a dozen governmental organizations and enterprises." Approximately $35 million was deposited into the Bank of Crete, doubling its deposits, from various state companies, including Attica Bank, Hellenic Post, Olympic Airways, and Greek Telecommunications Corporation (OTE).

In June 1988, the Bank of Greece attempted to audit the Bank of Crete, and Koskotas feared what might be uncovered and requested that the audit be paused through his connections to PASOK. Judicial investigations of the scandal were stalled by the Minister of Justice Agamemnon Koutsogiorgas. However, the Chief Judge of the Court of Appeals, Dimitris Blachos, went on holiday in Corfu on 5 July 1988, leaving the next judge in seniority in charge, Dimitris Tsevas, who re-initiated the judicial inquiry on 11 July 1988. Upon hearing the news, Blachos interrupted his holiday and reported Tsevas for a disciplinary violation. At the same time, the newspaper Eleftherotypia published the initial findings of the judicial inquiry. In August 1988, Koutsogiorgas enacted a special Secrecy Act legislation (Law 1806/1988) that provided Koskotas protection from potential investigations.

==== Papandreou heart surgery ====
Papandreou (at age 70) underwent major heart surgery in London in August 1988 and had to stay there for three months, and Koutsogiorgas was governing in his place, though Papandreou refused to step down officially. Papandreou's absence during these months also allowed the investigations to progress. Moreover, in London, it was revealed that next to him was not his wife but Dimitra Liani, an Olympic Airways steward aged 33, whom he had met in 1986, and she was a constant companion in the last months before the surgery. After his return, she appeared frequently next to Papandreou, who was still married, receiving wide publicity in the Greek press due to the disregard for the strong family tradition in Greece and became the symbol of the political and moral decline of PASOK's governance.

==== Koskotas' escape ====
On 20 October 1988, the Greek courts suspended Koskotas as chairman of the Bank of Crete and indicted him on five counts of forgery and embezzlement. Two days later, Papandreou returned from London. On 31 October, the courts also restricted Koskotas from leaving Greece while the investigation was pending. Koskotas panicked and swiftly sold the ownership of his media empire and Olympiakos football team. To avoid justice, he left Greece for the United States (with an intermediary stop at Brazil) on 5 November 1988 despite being under strict surveillance by Greek security forces, and left from Athens Airport with the help of Argyris Saliarelis and his private jet. On 7 November 1988, the Minister of Public Order, Tassos Sehiotis, resigned because his ministry was responsible for police surveillance of Koskotas. On 11 November, Minister of Justice Koutsogiorgas also resigned due to accusations of illegal financial transactions with Koskotas; Papandreou made him Premier Deputy in mid-November. The opposition leader, Mitsotakis, accused the PASOK government in Parliament: "The Greek people are left with the conviction that George Koskotas was spirited away so that he would not speak. The responsibility goes all the way to the top of the government." He demanded Papandreou and his government to resign.

=== U.S. arrest and revelations ===
Upon arrival at Bedford Airport near Boston, Massachusetts, Koskotas was arrested on 24 November 1988 for unresolved fraud crimes of his past, and he was jailed in the United States. On 28 November, Federal District Judge Miriam G. Cedarbaum froze Koskotas' United States assets (estimated between 30 and 35 million dollars) after the Bank of Crete filed in Manhattan a lawsuit accusing Koskotas of having embezzled hundreds of millions of dollars. The day after, Ron Liebman, Koskotas' lawyer, said that his client sought entry to the United States "because he had been advised that Greek operatives had been dispatched to kill him."

In December 1988, after the opposition and various respected former ministers called for a clean-up, Papandreou yielded to pressure and agreed to a parliamentary commission of inquiry. Demetrios Halikias, the governor of the Bank of Greece, testified to the commission on 7 December 1988 that two senior PASOK ministers (one of whom was Koutsogiorgas) had tried to prevent an audit of the Bank of Crete. On 10 December, Papandreou's legal adviser, Grigorios Kasimatis, resigned on the grounds that Koutsogiorgas continued to be in office after the testimony of Halikias. Additional resignations followed (Stathis Yiotas, Deputy Defence Minister, and Theodore Karatzas, Finance Under Secretary) upon the revelations during the inquiry that the members of Papandreou's government were profiteering by illegal arms sales to both sides in the Iran–Iraq War and the apartheid state of South Africa. It also revealed that for the "purchase of the century" (40 American F-16 and 40 French Mirage 2000 aircraft), the Greek state overpaid by as much as 20% above the actual cost due to illegal commissions to PASOK members.

Various media outlets started interviewing Koskotas for his position while he was in prison. On one occasion, he said,

There are many scandals in Greece [...] The only difference in my case is that here someone is saying, himself, what he did with Papandreou.

Koskotas claimed that he was able to approach Papandreou by hiring one of his close associates as the bank's general manager. For Koskotas, it was a transactional relationship. While Papandreou requested that Koskotas buy newspapers that had been critical of the PASOK government, including the magazine that published nude photographs of Papandreou's mistress, Koskotas was receiving swift approvals from the PASOK government for new bank branches throughout Greece. However, Papandreou's requests started to increase in frequency because Papandreou used the fact that Koskotas skipped bail in the US to extract favorable actions for PASOK. Examples included Koskotas buying the popular football team Olympiacos F.C. because the government wanted to build a new stadium for the team to solidify the youth vote, preventing the publication of a critical book by the first wife of Papandreou, and funding various pro-PASOK organizations.

In March 1989, Time magazine published an article titled "The looting of Greece," describing in detail the allegations that Koskotas made to US officials. Koskotas alleged that Papandreou and other PASOK high functionaries had ordered state corporations to deposit funds (over $200 million) with the Bank of Crete, which went missing in the form of bribes and the acquisition of mass media companies. When Koskotas was spooked by the June 1988 audit from the Bank of Greece, he told Koutsogiorgas, "If I am destroyed, we'll all be destroyed. You know what they will find at the bank." He also claimed that he talked to Papandreou directly, who responded, "Don't worry, I'll stop the audit. As long as I'm prime minister, nothing's going to happen." Koskotas claimed that on one occasion, he had delivered to Papandreou himself $600,000 stuffed in a Pampers Diapers box. Papandreou denied the story, accused the US of manufacturing this scandal to destroy him, and even sued Time magazine. Koskotas also revealed in an interview in The Times that Libyan leader Muammar Gaddafi and Palestine Liberation Organization (PLO) chief Yasser Arafat secretly funded Papandreou for his 1981 election campaign. Koskotas revealed that $2 million had been deposited in a Swiss account in exchange for Minister of Justice Koutsogiorgas for the legislation introduced in August 1988 that aimed at protecting him from investigations.

== Political turmoil ==
Koskotas's accusations gained international attention. Several months after the arrest of Koskotas, six ministers (including Costas Simitis) resigned in protest of the corruption among the most senior members of PASOK. There were demands for a vote of no confidence against the government, which Papandreou defeated in December 1988 and another one in March 1989. Still, three members of PASOK voted against the party line. However, Papandreou responded by removing them from PASOK, including Antonis Tritsis, who was a founding member of PASOK.

=== Abuse of power ===
Despite rising public frustration with the state of affairs, Papandreou abused his position to stay in power, having successfully removed constitutional restraints in 1985. Notable actions include, but are not limited to the following:

- Papandreou changed the electoral law shortly before the June 1989 general elections, a move designed to prevent New Democracy from securing an absolute majority.
- Bestowing public appointments to about 90,000 people to gain additional votes six months before the 1989 elections; the Synaspismos political party decried this as a "recruitment orgy." Papandreou's blatant patronage reached the point of giving, in one of his rallies, a public command to the Minister of Finance Dimitris Tsovolas to "give it all [to them]" (Greek: Τσοβόλα δώσ'τα όλα) and the crowd chanted these back.
- Judicial independence was damaged when Papandreou passed a law via emergency procedures—despite massive backlash from lawyers, judges, and clerks—to prevent the judicial investigation of the Koskotas scandal from advancing to the Athens Appeals Court.

=== June 1989 election campaigns ===
The election campaigns were conducted under a polarized atmosphere with inflammatory allegations and vitriolic personal attacks, even between the two leaders of the dominant political parties. PASOK's programme avoided mentioning the Koskotas scandal and instead emphasized economic modernization with slogans, "For Victory and New Progress," and "PASOK is here: certainty for the present, hope for the future." New Democracy's campaign strategy was based on liberalization of the market, i.e., "free the competitive forces of the market" from the overreaching state, but also criticized PASOK for the scandals with the slogan, "We deserve a better Greece."

On 2 June, Avriani, a tabloid newspaper supporting PASOK, published a transcript of a conversation between Mitsotakis and an unidentified mistress that was supposedly being taped and also claimed to possess 'pornographic' photographs of Mitsotakis but never published. This was in response to the publication of nude photos of sunbathing Liani, Papandreou's then-mistress. The rhetorical confrontation between the two leaders in the campaigns was personal. Papandreou implied that Mitsotakis was a Nazi collaborator during World War II and talked about Mitsotakis's treachery against his father's government during the constitutional crisis of Iouliana in the 1965–1967 period. On the other side, Mitsotakis, invoking the Koskotas scandal, talked of Papandreou's "little corrupt team that has looted Greece" and that PASOK was led by "a bunch of thieves." Papandreou's defense was that the scandal was created and used against him: "The Americans and the Right together with the crook Koskotas are conspiring to overthrow socialism in Greece." Despite the friction between the two sides in the newspapers, PASOK had the advantage of being the governing party, having control of the state apparatus that provided radio and television services, which became an unconcealed component of PASOK's propaganda. For example, state television programs, including from two foreign cable networks, were interrupted to display Papandreou's final speech at his mass rally in Athens, but no such opportunity was presented for other political leaders.

Weeks before the elections, various terrorist groups urged the public to spoil their ballots and used bombs against public buildings, including those of Ministry of Health and the Ministry of Justice.

Irregularities and poor vote handling and counting were reported on election day. Antonis Tritsis, a PASOK defector and leader of Greek Radical Movement, accused the state officials of not sending his party ballots to many polling stations. Mitsotakis also accused the government of failing to send the election officials to their appointed polling stations or of delaying the opening. Both New Democracy and Synaspismos were irritated by the refusal of the Ministry of Interior to release the official vote count, which was released a week later.

=== Catharsis ===
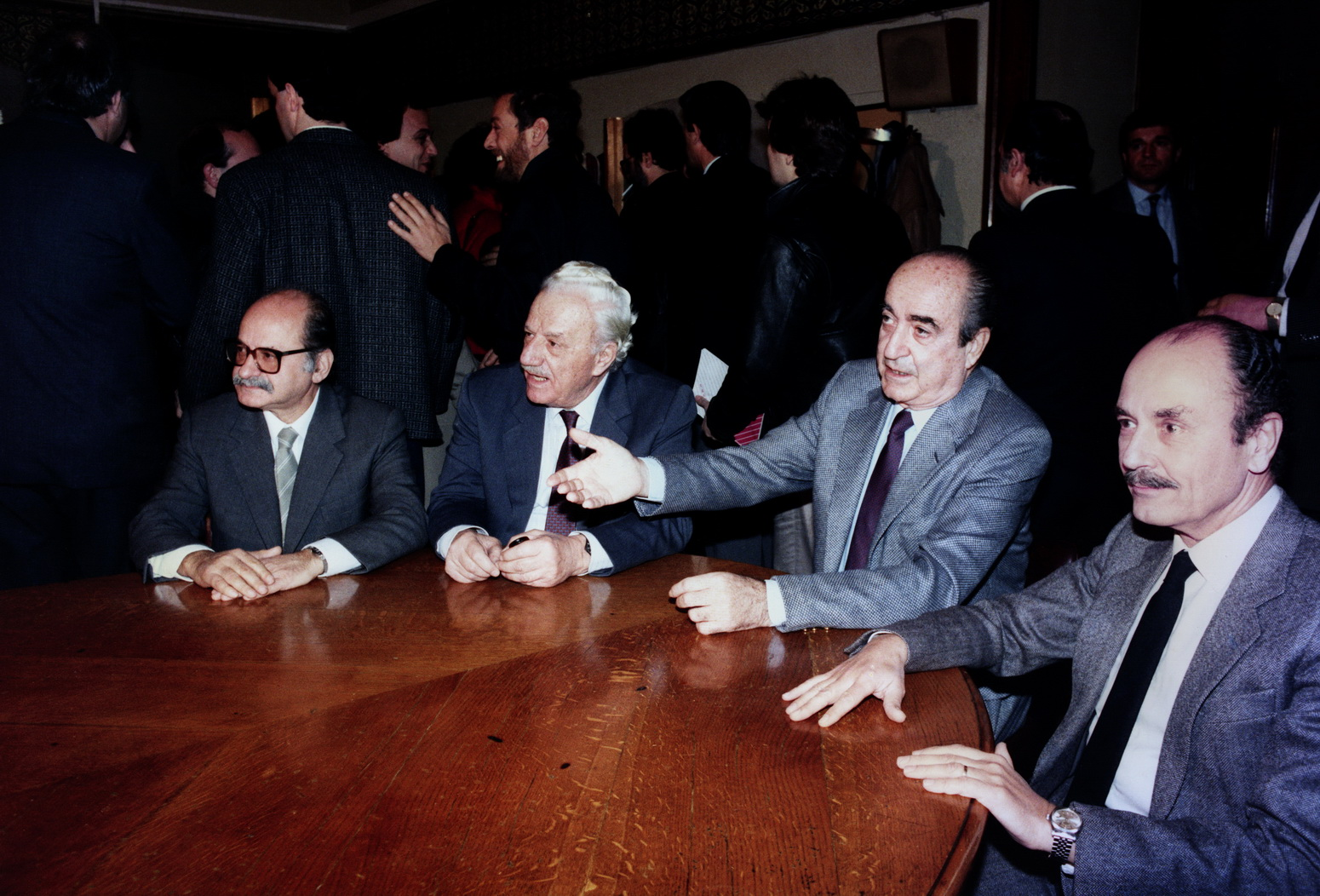
Two Greek communists and two conservative politicians (L-R: Leonidas Kyrkos, Charilaos Florakis, Mitsotakis, Konstantinos Stephanopoulos) discuss a time after the Papandreou indictment for the Koskotas scandal. Papandreou called them the "gang of four."

In the June 1989 elections, PASOK's electoral percentage dropped to 38%, down from 48% in 1981, primarily due to the fallout from the Koskotas scandal. Although Mitsotakis' New Democracy party secured 43%, it was insufficient to form a government, as Papandreou's last-minute change of the electoral law required a party to win 50% of the vote to govern alone. Papandreou hoped that while PASOK might come second in electoral votes, it could form a government with the support of the other leftist parties, but he was rejected. Instead, the right-wing New Democracy collaborated with the united Leftist parties under Synaspismos, led by Charilaos Florakis, to form a government under Tzannis Tzannetakis. Despite being on opposite ideological sides (as well as in the Greek Civil War), both sought a catharsis, meaning a thorough investigation of PASOK's corruption. This decision carried significant weight, as failing to bring charges against Papandreou under this coalition would prevent any future government from doing so according to the Greek constitution. The participation of the Synaspismos party in the government also marked the end of the militarized politics of the past, since there was no reaction from the military. Papandreou denounced the collaborative government as "unholy and unprincipled," and he ordered his ministers not to cooperate in the handover of power, and official documents and state treaties went missing.

Fotis Kouvelis, President of the Athens Bar Association, was appointed Minister of Justice and tasked with organizing the judicial processes for the parliamentary investigation and indictments. While the Minister of the Interior became Nikos Konstantopoulos, a PASOK defector, he was tasked with cleansing the state machine for the upcoming November election. On 8 July, the collaborative government received 174 out of 300 votes of confidence, signaling the start of parliamentary investigations. The government also granted the first private television broadcast licenses to publishers critical of PASOK as a counterbalance to state media to avoid future political exploitation from any future omnipotent prime minister.

==== Investigations ====
The main agenda in the parliamentary investigation was Koskotas' allegation that PASOK aimed to take interest from state deposits in the Bank of Crete to fund PASOK for the upcoming election campaign, and bribes were paid to George Louvaris, who was Papandreou's close friend and associate. A secondary allegation against Papandreou was that he used £6 million of state money to cover the settlement of debts of an Athens luxury hotelier in exchange for using a seaside villa along with Dimitra Liani before their marriage on 13 July.

Two more commission inquiries led to the Yugoslav corn and wiretapping scandals. The latter revealed that Papandreou used the Junta's surveillance infrastructure (filing and wiretapping) against any Greek citizen who was not loyal to him. The list of potential terrorists, according to Papandreou, included well-respected politicians such as Karamanlis, political opponents Mitsotakis and Evangelos Averoff, senior ministers in PASOK governments who may be potential successors such as Costas Simitis and Georgios Gennimatas, newspaper publishers, police chiefs, and PASOK's governmental spokesman. A former head of EYR appointed by PASOK claimed that none of these activities would have been possible without the prime minister's approval, implicating Papandreou.

==== Indictments and assassinations ====
Political polarization peaked five weeks before the scheduled elections of November 1989, when the Greek parliament was set to begin deliberations on whether Papandreou and four of his ministers should be indicted. On this day, 26 September 1989, just hours before deliberations were to start, Pavlos Bakoyannis (son-in-law of Mitsotakis), a prominent conservative member of parliament and the architect of collaboration between the Left and Right wings for Papandreou's indictment, was shot by the 17 November terrorist group outside his office in Athens. Both major political parties, New Democracy and PASOK, blamed each other for the assassination. The already tense and polarized rhetoric was further inflamed by the press, with one conservative newspaper publishing a front-page portrait of Papandreou with the headline, "He is the assassin." The same terrorist organization, a few months before, had attempted to assassinate George Petsos, who was slightly injured from a car explosion en route to work, for the alleged involvement in the Koskotas scandal. The day after Bakoyannis' death, Papandreou stormed out of Parliament, shouting, "I accuse my accusers," just before the parliamentary vote on his indictment.

After two days of debate, on 28 September, Papandreou and four of his ministers were indicted, marking the first and only time a prime minister of Greece has been indicted. The indictments were based on the following:

- Andreas Papandreou, Prime Minister, was accused of ordering the deposit of money from state organizations to Koskotas' bank, receiving bribes, and accepting proceeds of crime.
- Agamemnon Koutsogiorgas, Deputy Prime Minister, was accused of receiving bribes for advancing legislation to shield Koskotas from investigations and assisting a criminal.
- George Petsos, Minister of Transportation, was accused of receiving money from Koskotas and ordered the Hellenic Post, OTE, and Olympic Airways directors to deposit state money into the Bank of Crete. He was also accused of illegally granting a license for a building expansion, part of Koskotas's Grammi media corporation.
- Dimitris Tsovolas, Minister of Finance, was accused of using illegal methods to settle debts of the owner of the Hotel Grande Bretagne to the Greek state because Koskotas wanted to buy it free of debt.
- Panagiotis Roumeliotis, in violation of the law on ministerial liability.

Papandreou responded by claiming that the indictment was an effort "to besmirch my political honor and personal honesty," and then added, "is proving more and more to be a pretext for the settling of personal and political accounts [...] mudslinging aimed at the dissolution of PASOK." After the indictments, the collaborative government dissolved on 7 October, and a caretaker government under Ioannis Grivas took over until the elections on 5 November. On 22 October, there was an assassination attempt against Mitsotakis hours before addressing his supporters in Mytilini on the island of Lesbos.

=== National Unity government and 1990 elections ===
In the November 1989 elections, New Democracy won 46% of the vote but still could not form a government. All the parties in Parliament (New Democracy, PASOK, and Synaspismos) entered a National Union government, which excluded the leaders of the three parties, under Xenophon Zolotas (a retired banker at the age of 85) as a way out of the deadlock and to restore public trust in political institutions. Zolotas resigned in April 1990 due to the inability to reverse the continuous deterioration of the Greek economy under Papandreou's handling in previous years. In the elections of April 1990, Mitsotakis received sufficient (by one seat above the threshold) support to form a government, and Papandreou became the opposition leader. This marked the end of the political dominance of PASOK in its first era.

== Trial ==
Koskotas was extradited to Greece in 1991 for the trial, and Papandreou's trial began in Athens on 11 March 1991. However, as a former prime minister, he exercised his constitutional right not to attend the trial and proclaimed that the trial was a witch-hunt. Roumeliotis also did not participate in the trial because he had become a deputy of the European Parliament and had immunity from prosecution. In January 1992, the Parliament-appointed tribunal of 13 judges of the Supreme Special Court, having heard over 100 witnesses and investigated 50,000 pages of documents over ten months, acquitted Papandreou of the charge of instigating the loss of funds of state companies with a 7–6 vote and a bribery charge of receiving the proceeds of a crime with a vote of 10–3. A month into the trial, the deputy of the Prime Minister, Agamemnon Koutsogeorgas, who was a close friend of Papandreou, had a stroke on the witness stand, on live television, and died a few days afterward. Dimitris Tsovolas, the former Minister of Finance, was sentenced to two and a half years in prison and a three-year ban on holding any political office. George Petsos was sentenced to ten months in prison and received a two-year ban from holding any political office. Koskotas was tried and sentenced to a 25-year prison term; he served twelve years in prison, after which he was released.

The reasoning of the judges regarding their verdict for Papandreou is outlined in the opinion:

The court was not convinced that this defendant in any way caused the public utilities administrators' decision to carry out the acts in question attributed to them, nor did he cooperate in any way in these acts. [...] Moreover, the publishers who vaguely testified that Andreas Papandreou also bears criminal responsibilities responded to relevant questions that were submitted to them that they do not have specific evidence from which it appears that the defendant mentioned above had given orders to administrators of public enterprises to deposit their available funds in the Bank of Crete. However, beyond these, no evidence emerged that the former prime minister was aware of the embezzlement committed by Georgios Koskotas during the critical period from 19 January 1988 to 19 October 1988, when he was embezzling deposits at the Bank of Crete.

The judges who dissented explained their reasoning as follows:

The first of the defendants, as Prime Minister of Greece and during the critical period from 11 June 1987 to 19 October 1988, had the self-evident obligation and primary duty under the provisions of the Constitution and the law to direct the actions of the government, to coordinate government policy in all sectors and to supervise the implementation of laws in the interest of the state and the citizens. He also had the opportunity, as the political head of the [National Intelligence Service] EYP, to learn immediately about Georgios Koskotas' identity and activities. It is inconceivable that a prime minister of the former's intelligence would not want to find out who Georgios Koskotas was when the press and all Greeks were wondering how someone so young could buy a bank and constantly create new businesses, but also be sent to the US on a government recommendation to meet with the President and other US officials. [...] Despite all this, George Koskotas enjoyed the full support and coverage of political power. He had the opportunity to address and be addressed by the prime minister of his country with declarative phrases of intimacy, he had the opportunity to see the prime minister in person at his residence at a time when Greek society had begun to be convinced of his actions. And also to have his protection, as is evident from the fact that the Prime Minister's Secretary intervened on his behalf at the behest of Andreas Papandreou and forced Deputy Minister Georgios Petsos to receive Koskotas and serve him.

When Constantine Karamanlis was asked about the verdict, he remarked, "In democracies, prime ministers do not go to prison. They return home." With this, he reaffirmed the court's decision while also acknowledging both positive and negative consequences for the country. The trial was characterized as the "trial of trials" and the most critical judicial decision in modern Greek history since the Trial of the Six in 1922.

== Aftermath ==
The Koskotas scandal was pivotal during the Metapolitefsi era, contributing to the collapse of Greece's popular PASOK government, harming the economy, and tarnishing the country's reputation internationally. Its significance is reflected in three ways. First, the scandal rocked the Greek political establishment due to the unprecedented trial of a Greek prime minister by a civilian court, and a large number of politicians and state officials were implicated and put on trial. The retired Karamanlis commented on the political situation at the end of Papandreou's second administration: "[Greece has become] a boundless lunatic asylum." Second, during the Koskotas trial, the government's relationships with other elites in Greek society, which had previously been opaque, were exposed to the public; these "interwoven interests" had grown due to the influx of money from the European Economic Community. Third, the size of the money embezzled was unprecedented, as a diplomat based in Athens described it: "A quarter to a third of a billion dollars in a country whose legal economy is only about $42 billion, [...] this thing is Drexel [Burnham] Lambert, Ivan Boesky and Billy Sol Estes rolled into one."

=== Public attention ===
The scandal attracted considerable domestic and international attention because, as journalist Stephen Brookes explained, it had "all the right ingredients – a fat banker, mink-coated women, death threats, corrupt politicians, suitcases of cash passed surreptitiously in Athens hotel rooms – the papers have been having a field day." The scandal, along with the public affair with Liani, became a source of nightly satire in theaters of Athens. Lakis Lazopoulos, a comedian, commented, "You can look at what is going on in Greece... and choose to laugh or cry," and he added, "My country has become a cabaret review."

The widespread scandals, mostly stemming from the Koskotas affair, that dominated public life and discourse in 1989 gave rise to the term "Dirty '89"; journalists used it to denigrate the historic compromise, catharsis, between the Left and the Right. Nevertheless, the trial and daily debates on television, radio, and in the press had a cathartic effect on the public, helping to alleviate collective guilt since many Greeks participated in the rise of socialism in Greece, voted for PASOK, or were recipients of Papandreou's patronage. The trial also reinforced the idea among ordinary citizens that no one is above the law.

=== Social norms ===
The Koskotas scandal sparked social studies into Greek political culture. One finding was that the Koskotas scandal affected voter preferences, while the Liani affair did not have a significant effect. The latter suggested that Greek society, while traditional, is not a puritan society, tolerating extra-marital relations. However, the fallout from the Koskotas scandal was less extensive than expected if the same had happened in a Western democratic country. After the indictment, Papandreou even gained 1.5% of the vote in the November elections. Scholars attribute the loyalty of a significant portion of the Greek electorate to Papandreou's system of patronage. Before Papandreou came to power, political parties were characterized by decentralized clientelistic networks controlled by politicians who were not entirely loyal to the party leader. Papandreou changed it to a centralized personalism, a typical feature of populists.

Papandreou merged party politics with the state, effectively making the state the source of his patronage. A notable example is that, in the early 1980s, when the European Economic Community provided funds to Greece for its transition into the European market, recipients believed that the funds came from the PASOK government rather than the Community itself. Another aspect was that over one-third of the Athenians surveyed believed that Koskotas was a Central Intelligence Agency agent tasked with destabilizing the Greek political system, which was resonating with the conspiratorial rhetoric of Papandreou and amplified by the pro-PASOK and state media.

Pappas noted, "This refusal to distinguish between party loyalty on the one hand, and political corruption and constitutional violence on the other, is in itself another sad reflection of contemporary Greek life." Another scholar, Quinn, provided the following observation, "Despite the allegations and accusations, Mr. Papandreou proved that the force of his personality has left a mark on the Greek people [...] people do not vote for a party [...] they vote for people, charisma and personality." This observation suggested that the political ethics of Greek society differ from those of other Western countries. Dimitras provided a more detailed explanation, "Greeks believe that political life and politicians are corrupt anyway, some more, others less [...] The moral issue here is not as important as in other countries."

=== Greek state reformed and the return to power ===
After Papandreou's fall, Mitsotakis undertook reforms aimed at repairing the damage caused by the patronage-driven and polarized politics that had defined the 1980s. He moved to restore Greece's strained relations with the U.S., damaged by Papandreou's strong anti-American rhetoric, by signing a defense cooperation agreement that allowed American military bases to operate in Greece for another eight years. Greece also supported the Gulf War by providing airspace and naval assistance. Mitsotakis reversed Papandreou's lenient stance on terrorism by reinstating Karamanlis' anti-terrorism law (Law 1916/1990), expelling known terrorists as well as representatives of the Palestine Liberation Organization. Domestically, his government introduced a series of austerity measures to stabilize the economy and align Greece with the Euro convergence criteria. These economic policies helped spur a recovery, but the social impact of austerity sparked widespread public dissatisfaction. In 1993, Mitsotakis' narrow parliamentary majority collapsed when MP Antonis Samaras left the New Democracy party in protest against Mitsotakis' moderate approach to the Macedonia naming dispute, leading to the fall of the government.

Papandreou returned to the political stage by promising to revive the euphoria of early 1980s rule, and PASOK was rebranded as a more responsible and moderate party, shedding much of its earlier socialist rhetoric. In the October 1993 elections, PASOK returned to power. However, once in office, Papandreou abandoned many of his campaign promises and largely continued Mitsotakis' austerity policies, making only minor adjustments while pushing forward with economic liberalization and deregulation, but at a slower pace. In 1994, Papandreou retaliated for the Koskotas indictment and accused Mitsotakis of accepting bribes related to the sale of a state-owned cement company to an Italian firm, with additional charges included illegal wiretapping of political opponents and unlawful possession of antiquities, however, all of which were eventually dropped.

From mid-1995, Papandreou's health rapidly declined, confining him to his home. After experiencing severe complications in late November, he resigned on January 16, 1996, and passed away on June 23, 1996.

=== Containing the fallout ===
Once the authorities' investigations concluded, all non-politician individuals involved in the scandal were fined monetary amounts. Two such individuals became fugitives to avoid justice, and another committed suicide.

After PASOK's return to power in 1993, it introduced legislation (Law 2298/1995) to end any pending cases from the fallout of the Koskotas scandal; the law violated Article 4 of the Greek Constitution. Later on, the Supreme Court of Greece noted that while the Parliament may be unwilling to lift the immunity of its deputies and prosecute those involved, it argued that the legislation did not apply to non-politicians like Koskotas.

=== Banking ===
Since the Koskotas scandal, the Greek banking system has been modernized, and banking supervision has become stricter. Specifically, all banks and companies on the Athens Stock Exchange adhere to a mandatory corporate governance code, which requires an internal auditor to report to the audit committee of members of the board of directors. In 2002, this corporate governance code became mandatory. The need for auditors led to the creation of new auditing firms and the establishment of the Accounting Standardization Committee, a public body that supervises auditing reports in Greece and takes disciplinary action against improprieties by banks, companies, and auditors who fail to perform their duties. In 1998, the chief accountant became co-responsible with the chief executive officer of a company after Presidential Decree 340/1998; beforehand, the accountants were not responsible since they were viewed as employees.

After the Koskotas scandal was unraveled, the Bank of Crete was privatized and merged with other Greek banking institutions.

== Notes ==
1. The total amount of money was substantial, approximately 1/280 of the Greek economy, based on Greece's GDP in 1986 of US$56 billion.
2. While it is frequent in Greek history for the governing party to change the electoral law for its purposes, Papandreou's electoral law change in 1989 was unique as it personally benefited him to avoid an indictment for the Koskotas scandal and be sentenced to life in prison if convicted.

== Sources ==
Constitution and laws of Greece

- "Greek Constitution of 1986". Government Gazette (Greece) ΦΕΚ A 23/1986 (in Greek). National Printing Office.
- "(Νόμος 1806/1988) Τροποποίηση της νομοθεσίας για τα Ελληνικά Χρηματιστήρια Αξιών και άλλες διαταξείς" [Amendment of the legislation on the Greek Stock Exchanges and other provisions]. Government Gazette (Greece) ΦΕΚ Α 207/1988 (in Greek). National Printing Office.
- "(Νόμος 62/1995) Συμβιβαστική επίλυση ιδιωτικών διαφορών-Επιτάχυνση διαδικασίας αναγκαστικής εκτέλεσης-Σχεδιασμός και εφαρμογή Σωφρονιστικής Πολιτικής και άλλες διατάξεις" [Conciliation of private disputes – accelerating the enforcement procedure – design and implementation of correctional policy and other provisions]. Government Gazette (Greece) ΦΕΚ Α 62/1995 (in Greek). National Printing Office.

Books

- Allen, Louis (1990). Political Scandals and Causes Celebres Since 1945. Essex: Longman. ISBN 978-0582030657.
- Bellou, Fotini; Couloumbis, Theodore A.; Kariotis, Theodore C., eds. (2003). Greece in the twentieth century. London & New York: Routledge. ISBN 9780203045893.
  - Iatrides, John O. "The United States and Greece in the Twentieth Century". In Bellou, Couloumbis & Kariotis (2003), pp. 69–110.
  - Afentouli, Ino. "The Greek media landscape". In Bellou, Couloumbis & Kariotis (2003), pp. 170–182.
- Clogg, Richard (2013). A Concise History of Greece. Cambridge: Cambridge University Press. ISBN 9781107656444.
- Close, David H. (2014). Greece since 1945: Politics, Economy and Society. London & New York: Taylor & Francis. ISBN 9781317880011.
- Curtis, Glenn E. (1995). Greece, A Country Study. Maryland: Library of Congress. ISBN 1490436235.
- Featherstone, Kevin; Katsoudas, Dimitrios K., eds. (1987). Political change in Greece: Before and after the colonels. London & New York: Taylor & Francis. ISBN 9781000992144.
  - Katsoudas, Dimitrios K. "The Constitutional framework". In Featherstone & Katsoudas (1987), pp. 14–33.
- Featherstone, Kevin; Papadimitriou, Dimitris (2015). Prime Ministers in Greece, The Paradox of Power. Oxford: Oxford University Press. ISBN 978-0198717171.
- Gallant, Thomas W. (2016). Modern Greece: From the war of independence to the present. London: Bloomsbury Publishing. ISBN 9781350014510.
- Garrard, James; Newell, John, eds. (2006). Scandals in past and contemporary politics. Manchester: Manchester University Press. ISBN 9780719065514.
  - Koutsoukis, Kleomenis S. "Political scandals and crisis management in Greece, 1821-2001". In Garrard & Newell (2006), pp. 123–136.
- Grigoriadis, Ioannis N., ed. (2017). Democratic transition and the rise of Populist Majoritarianism: Constitutional Reform in Greece and Turkey. Cham: Palgrave Macmillan. ISBN 9783319575551.
  - Grigoriadis, Ioannis N. "The Rising Tide of Populist Majoritarianism in Greece". In Grigoriadis (2017), pp. 41–52.
- Gunther, Richard; Diamandouros, Nikiforos; Sotiropoulos, Dimitri, eds. (2006). Democracy and the state in the new southern Europe. Oxford: Oxford University Press. ISBN 9780191513961.
  - Magalhaes, Pedro C.; Guarnieri, Carlo; Kaminis, Yorgos. "Democratic consolidation, judicial reform, and the judicialization of politics in Southern Europe". In Gunther, Diamandouros & Sotiropoulos (2006), pp. 138–196.
- Jones, Michael J., ed. (2011). Creative Accounting, Fraud and International Accounting Scandals. West Sussex: Wiley. ISBN 9781119978626.
  - Kontos, George; Kambria-Kapardis, Maria; Milonas, Nikolaos. "Creative accounting and fraud in Greece". In Jones (2011), pp. 211–232.
- Kaplan, Robert D. (1994). Balkan Ghosts, A Journey Through History. London: Vintage Books. ISBN 0679749810.
- Kofas, Jon V. (2005). Independence from America: global integration and inequality. Burlington: Ashgate. ISBN 9780754645085.
- Koliopoulos, John S.; Veremis, Thanos M. [in Greek] (2009). Modern Greece A History Since 1821. Oxford: Wiley-Blackwell. ISBN 9781444314830.
- Liakos, Antonis [in Greek]; Doumanis, Nicholas (2023). The Edinburgh History of the Greeks, 20th and Early 21st Centuries: Global Perspectives. Edinburgh: Edinburgh University Press. ISBN 978-1474410847.
- Lodge, Juliet, ed. (1990). The 1989 Election of the European Parliament. New York: Palgrave Macmillan. ISBN 9781349108930.
  - Featherstone, Kevin; Verney, Susannah. "Greece". In Lodge (1990), pp. 90–106.
- Magone, José (2003). The Politics of Southern Europe Integration Into the European Union. Santa Barbara: ABC-CLIO. ISBN 9780313051678.
- Pirounakis, Nicholas (1997). The Greek Economy Past, Present and Future. London: Palgrave Macmillan. ISBN 978-0333654224.
- Pappas, Takis S. (2019). Populism and liberal democracy: A comparative and theoretical analysis. Oxford: Oxford University Press. ISBN 9780192574893.
- Pridham, Geoffrey, ed. (2012). Securing Democracy. London & New York: Taylor & Francis. ISBN 9781134975419.
  - Featherstone, Kevin. "Political parties and democratic consolidation in Greece". In Pridham (2012), pp. 179–202.
- Sassoon, Donald, ed. (1997). Looking left: European socialism after the Cold War. London: I.B. Taurus. ISBN 1860641792.
  - Fouskas, Vassilis. "The Left and the crisis of the Third Hellenic Republic, 1989–97". In Sassoon (1997), pp. 64–87.
- Siani-Davies, Peter (2017). Crisis in Greece. Oxford: Oxford University Press. ISBN 9780190911539.

Journals

- Borgeas, Andreas (2016). "The Evolution of Greece's Security Legislation and Policy". Journal of International and Comparative Law. 3 (2): 161–208.
- Clive, Nigel (1989). "Letter from Greece—mid-December 1988". Government and Opposition. 24 (1): 74–80. doi:10.1111/j.1477-7053.1989.tb00108.x. JSTOR 44482421.
- —————— (1990). "The Dilemmas of Democracy in Greece". Government and Opposition. 25 (1): 115–122. doi:10.1111/j.1477-7053.1990.tb00750.x. JSTOR 44482490.
- Clogg, Richard (1985). "The 1985 Constitutional Crisis in Greece". The Journal of Modern Hellenism. 2 (1): 103–112.
- Dobratz, Betty A.; Whitfield, Stefanie (1992). "Does Scandal Influence Voters' Party Preference? The Case of Greece during the Papandreou Era". European Sociological Review. 8 (2): 167–180. doi:10.1093/oxfordjournals.esr.a036630. JSTOR 522295.
- Featherstone, Kevin (1990). "The 'party‐state' in Greece and the fall of Papandreou". West European Politics. 13 (1): 101–115. doi:10.1080/01402389008424782.
- Karyotis, Georgios (September 2007). "Securitization of Greek Terrorism and Arrest of the 'Revolutionary Organization November 17'". Cooperation and Conflict. 42 (3): 271–293. doi:10.1177/0010836707079932. JSTOR 45084485.
- Kassimeris, George (1993). "The Greek state response to terrorism". Terrorism and Political Violence. 5 (4): 288–310. doi:10.1080/09546559308427230.
- Kollias, Christos; Messis, Petros; Mylonidis, Nikolaos; Paleologou, Suzanna-Maria (2009). "Terrorism and the effectiveness of security spending in Greece: Policy implications of some empirical findings". Journal of Policy Modeling. 31 (5): 788–802.
- Samatas, Minas (1993). "The Populist Phase of an Underdeveloped Surveillance Society: Political Surveillance in Post-Dictatorial Greece". Journal of the Hellenic Diaspora. 19 (1): 31–70.
- Spourdalakis, Michalis (1996). "PASOK's second chance". Mediterranean Politics. 1 (3): 320–336. doi:10.1080/13629399608414591.
- Papathanassopoulos, Stylianos (1990). "Broadcasting, politics and the state in Socialist Greece". Media, Culture & Society. 12 (3): 387–397. doi:10.1177/016344390012003007.

Newspapers and magazines

- "New issues raised for US on Greece". The New York Times. 11 March 1985.
- "Greek aide quits after indicted banker flees". Washington Post. 8 November 1988.
- "Greek banker arrested at Boston airport". Washington Post. 24 November 1988.
- Stephen Labaton. "Judge Freezes the U.S. Assets of a Fugitive Greek Banker". The New York Times.
- William D. Montalbano (15 January 1989). "Sickness, Sex, Scandals: Embattled Papandreou at Center of Storm in Greece". Los Angeles Times.
- "Papandreou Survives No-Confidence Motion". The New York Times. 14 March 1989.
- Robert Ajemian (13 March 1989). "Scandals The Looting of Greece". TIME magazine.
- Stephen Brookes (6 March 1989). "Awash in Scandal, Greece Wrestles its Political Furies". Athens: Insight Magazine.
- Doyle McManus (16 April 1989). "Koskotas Implicates Premier in Payoffs, Bribery: Ex-Banker's Tale May Be Greek Tragedy". Los Angeles Times.
- "Grave Scandal for Greece". The New York Times. 18 June 1989.
- "Papandreou Marries 34-Year-Old Mistress". Los Angeles Times. 13 July 1989.
- Marlise Simons (27 September 1989). "Greek lawmaker is slain in Athens". The New York Times.
- Marlise Simons (28 September 1989). "Corruption Trial for Papandreou Is Ordered by Greece's Parliament". The New York Times.
- "Papandreou Trial a Modern Drama". Chicago Tribune. 5 October 1989.
- Marlise Simons (17 January 1992). "Greek ex-premier not guilty in bank scandal". The New York Times.
- Dimitris Kapranos (4 March 2003). "Greece's tradition of spectacular trials". Kathimerini.
- Δήμητρα Κρουστάλλη (3 September 2016). "Από την ταράτσα της Νομικής στον Κουτσόγιωργα και στον Παππά" (in Greek). Το Βήμα.
- "Οι δίκες που συγκλόνισαν την Ελλάδα από τον Μπελογιάννη και την Χούντα έως την Χρυσή Αυγή" (in Greek). Neos Kosmos. 22 October 2020.
- Δέσποινα Τριβόλη (10 June 2022). "31 χρόνια από το σκάνδαλο Κοσκωτά" (in Greek). LiFo.
- Μαρία Δεδούση (2 October 2022). "Σαν σήμερα: 2 Οκτωβρίου – Πώς κατάφερε να ξεγελάσει όλη την Ελλάδα ο Γιώργος Κοσκωτάς;" (in Greek). CNN Greece.
- Καρύδη, Ειρήνη (2 October 2023). "Σκάνδαλο Κοσκωτά: Σαν σήμερα το 1990 ο Μένιος Κουτσόγιωργας προφυλακίζεται για υπόθαλψη εγκληματία και παθητική δωροδοκία". Eleftheros Typos.
- Νίκος Μποζιονέλος (31 January 2024). "Η "αγορά του αιώνα": Κατασκοπία και σκάνδαλα για F-16 και Mirage επί εποχής Ανδρέα Παπανδρέου" (in Greek). Gov News.

Web and other sources

- "Greece's GDP over the years". World Bank.
- "Greece's unemployment (%)". International Monetary Fund.
- "Greece's inflation rate (%)". International Monetary Fund.
- "Greece's debt over GDP (%)". International Monetary Fund.

== Additional reading ==
- Koskotas v. Roche, 740 F. Supp. 904 (U.S. District Court for the District of Massachusetts 27 June 1990).
