= Pajamas (disambiguation) =

Pajamas are a type of loose garment.

Pajamas or pyjamas may also refer to:

- Pajamas (film), a 1927 American comedy
- Pajamas, a 1980 song by Livingston Taylor from the 1980 Sesame Street compilation album, In Harmony

== See also ==
- Pyjamas coup, a 1975 coup d'etat attempt in Greece
- Pajamas Media or PJ Media, a blog hosting company
- Pyjama shark, a fish species
- Vasco Pyjama, a cartoon character
