= Manolis Papastefanakis =

Greek politician (1940–2024)

- Μανόλης Παπαστεφανάκης

Member of the Hellenic Parliament for the Constituency of Heraklion
- In office 10 October 1993 – 24 August 1996
- In office 18 October 1981 – 12 March 1990

Minister of the Interior
- In office 5 February 1987 – 23 September 1987
- Preceded by: Menios Koutsogiorgas
- Succeeded by: Akis Tsochatzopoulos

Personal details
- Born: 1940 Faistos, Greece
- Died: 21 September 2024 (aged 84) Heraklion, Greece
- Party: PASOK
- Occupation: Lawyer

Manolis Papastefanakis (Greek: Μανόλης Παπαστεφανάκης; 1940 – 21 September 2024) was a Greek lawyer and politician. A member of PASOK, he served in the Hellenic Parliament from 1981 to 1990 and again from 1993 to 1996 and was Minister of the Interior from February to September 1987.

Papastefanakis died in Heraklion on 21 September 2024, at the age of 84.
