= Vradyni =

Weekly Greek newspaper

- Type: Weekly newspaper
- Owner: "Entypoekdotiki SA"
- Founded: 1923
- Political alignment: Liberal Conservative, Pro-New Democracy
- Language: Greek
- Headquarters: 166 Ionias Ave., Kato Patisia 11144
- City: Athens
- Country: Greece
- Website: Official website

I Vradyni, or simply Vradyni (Greek: Η Βραδυνή, "The Evening"), is an Athens-based nationally published weekly Greek newspaper. It has a liberal approach to the economy and a traditional right-wing political orientation. The newspaper is published by Entypoekdotiki

== Political interactions ==
In 1973, Vradyni published an open letter by former Prime Minister Konstantinos Karamanlis calling for the military regime to restore power to King Constantine, with the result that the Greek judiciary issued warrants for the paper's publisher and editor. On 2 December 1973, the paper was shut down by the Greek military police for publishing an article critical of the then-government's lack of action on re-establishing parliamentary rule.

In June 1988, George Koskotas bought the newspaper as part of silencing the critics of Andreas Papandreou and his socialist government. Once the Koskotas scandal unraveled in 1989, Koskotas sold the newspaper.
