= Nikos Konstantopoulos =

Greek politician (born 1942)

- Νίκος Κωνσταντόπουλος
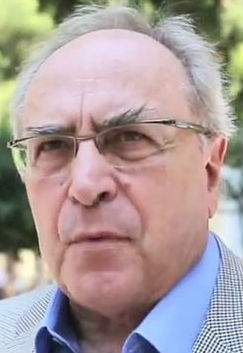
- Konstantopoulos in 2013

President of Synaspismos
- In office 19 December 1993 – 12 December 2004
- Preceded by: Maria Damanaki
- Succeeded by: Alekos Alavanos

Minister of the Interior and Administrative Reconstruction
- In office 2 July 1989 – 12 October 1989
- Prime Minister: Tzannis Tzannetakis
- Preceded by: Panagiotis Markopoulos
- Succeeded by: Vassilios Skouris

Personal details
- Born: 8 June 1942 (age 84) Krestena, Greece
- Party: Centre Union (Before 1974); Panhellenic Socialist Movement (1974–1975); Socialist March (1975–1979); Independent (1979–1989); Coalition of Left, of Movements and Ecology (1989–2004)
- Other political affiliations: Democratic Defence (1967–1974); Progress and Left Forces Alliance (1977–1978)
- Children: 3, including Zoe
- Education: University of Athens

Konstantopoulos among other protesters against the 27th G8 summit in Genoa

Nikos Konstantopoulos (Greek: Νίκος Κωνσταντόπουλος; born 8 June 1942) is a Greek politician, former member of the Hellenic Parliament and former president of the left-wing Synaspismos. His daughter, Zoe Konstantopoulou, until September 2015, was the Speaker of the Hellenic Parliament.

== Biography ==
Born in 1942 in the village of Krestena, near Olympia, Konstantopoulos studied law in the University of Athens. During his period as a law student he became actively involved in the student movement as a member of the Center Union.

During the Greek military junta of 1967-1974, his ideas became more radical. He was a member of the Democratic Defense anti-junta resistance group. He was arrested, tortured and sentenced in 8 years of imprisonment by the regime in 1970. After the restoration of democracy in 1974, Konstantopoulos joined the movement for the abolishment of the monarchy in the country, a goal succeeded through the 1974 referendum.

Ηe was charter member of the Panhellenic Socialist Movement (PASOK) in 1974. One year later, he was expelled due to his disagreement with the party's leader, Andreas Papandreou. Together with professor Sakis Karagiorgas, a partner from the resistance, he founded a party called Socialist March (Greek: Σοσιαλιστική Πορεία), which he served as spokesman from 1975 to 1979. He took part in the 1977 general election as a member of the short-lived Socialist March within the Alliance of Progressive and Left-Wing Forces (Greek: Συμμαχία των Αριστερών και Προοδευτικών Δυνάμεων).

He became a founding and leading member of Synaspismos in 1989. In the same year, he was elected member of the parliament and served as minister for the interior in the coalition government of Tzannis Tzannetakis, New Democracy. This unusual left-conservative alliance, plus the fact that Konstantopoulos was one of the prosecution lawyers in the trials (Koskotas scandal) of Andreas Papandreou and many others of his former PASOK companions, made Synaspismos and personally Konstantopoulos targets of severe criticism.

In the 1993 general election, the failure of Synaspismos to pass the 3 per cent threshold in order to enter the parliament was a near disaster for the party. Maria Damanaki, who was then the president of Synaspismos, resigned from her position, and Konstantopoulos was elected as the party leader. He soon became very popular, being among the top in opinion polls. In the 1996 election, Synaspismos re-entered the parliament with a percentage of 5.2 percent countrywide, a success credited to a large extent to Konstantopoulos himself.

In the 2000 general election held in April, Synaspismos got 3.2 percent at a national level.

In the 2004 general election held in March, Synaspismos narrowly escaped from being excluded from the parliament again, acquiring 3.2 percent at a national level, despite the fact it had formed an alliance ("Syriza") with other minor parties of the Greek left. This alliance became inactive in a few weeks' time, failing to participate united in the same year's European Parliament election (June). Konstantopoulos received criticism from both his party's members and his left allies for the two consecutive failures, and announced that he would retire as president at the next Synaspismos congress. The Synaspismos congress of December 2004 elected Alekos Alavanos as the party president.

Konstantopoulos has also worked as a lawyer, specializing in various issues of institutional reforms, law modernization, criminal law and the defence of civil rights.

In 2010, he was for a short time president of Panathinaikos F.C.

Political offices
Preceded by Panagiotis Markopoulos	Minister of the Interior and Administrative Reconstruction; 1989	Succeeded by Vassilios Skouris
Party political offices
Preceded by Maria Damanaki	Leader of Synaspismos; 1993–2004	Succeeded by Alekos Alavanos
