= Maria Damanaki =

Greek politician

- Μαρία Δαμανάκη
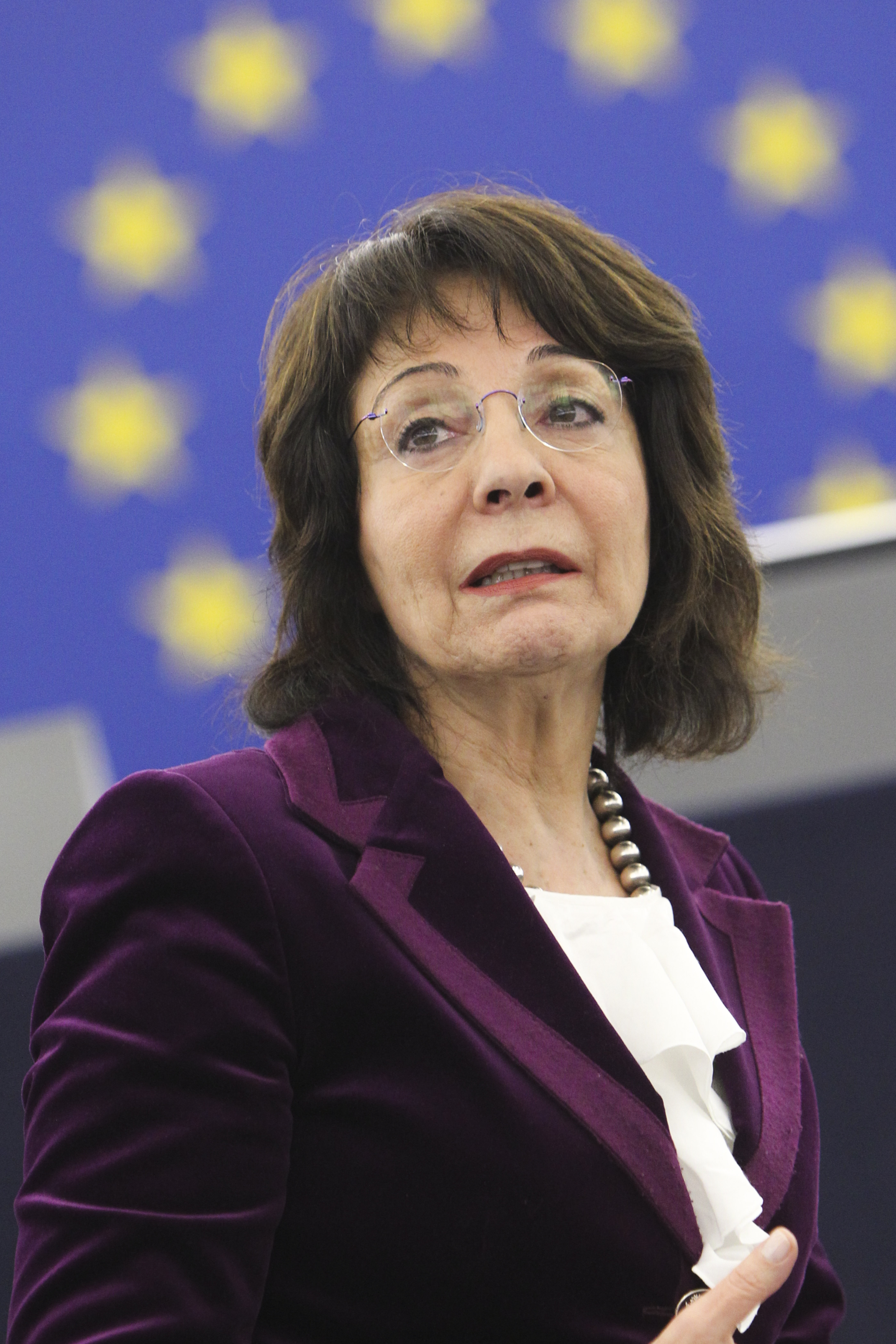
- Damanaki in 2013

European Commissioner for Maritime Affairs and Fisheries
- In office 9 February 2010 – 31 October 2014
- President: José Manuel Barroso
- Preceded by: Joe Borg
- Succeeded by: Karmenu Vella (Environment; Maritime; Affairs and Fisheries)

First Deputy Speaker of the Hellenic Parliament
- In office 4 July 1989 – 21 November 1989

President of Synaspismos
- In office 18 March 1991 – 19 December 1993
- Preceded by: Charilaos Florakis
- Succeeded by: Nikos Konstantopoulos

Member of the Hellenic Parliament for Athens B
- In office 16 September 2007 – 9 February 2010 (resigned)
- In office 20 November 1977 – 10 October 2003 (resigned)

Member of the Hellenic Parliament for National list
- In office 7 March 2004 – 18 August 2007

Municipal Councillor of the Municipality of Athens
- In office 1 January 1995 – 9 April 2000 (resigned)

Personal details
- Born: 31 May 1952 (age 74) Agios Nikolaos, Greece
- Party: Communist Party (1972–1991); Synaspismós (1991–2003); Panhellenic Socialist Movement (2003–present)
- Spouses: Dimitris Karangoules (divorced); Dimitris Danikas (divorced); Giorgos Kimoulis (divorced)
- Children: 3
- Education: National Technical University of Athens (MS); Lancaster University

Maria Damanaki (Greek: Μαρία Δαμανάκη; born 31 May 1952) is a Greek politician. She is a former president of the Synaspismos party of the left and former state member of the Hellenic Parliament within the Panhellenic Socialist Movement (PASOK). She served as the Global Managing Director for Oceans at The Nature Conservancy. In this capacity leads a global team focused on how the world manages its oceans, including sustainable fisheries management, large-scale protection and restoration of coral reefs and other ecosystems, coastal resilience, and mapping and quantification of the full value of the world's oceans to people.

== Early life and education ==
Damanaki was born in Agios Nikolaos, Crete, in 1952, and studied chemical engineering in the National Technical University of Athens.

== Political career ==
As a student, Damanaki became a member of the Communist Youth of Greece, the youth section of the Communist Party of Greece (KKE), but also became actively involved in the antidictatorial struggle and took part in the Athens Polytechnic uprising. Damanaki was the voice of the famous "Εδώ Πολυτεχνείο" ("This is the Polytechnic") radio broadcast from within the uprising, calling Greek citizens out to support; she was arrested and tortured by the regime.

=== Member of the Greek Parliament, 1977–1993 ===
From 1977 to 1993 Damanaki was consistently elected member of the Hellenic Parliament, first with the Communist Party and then with Synaspismos, the new party she became president of in 1991. This made her Greece's first female party president, preceded by being the first woman elected as Vice President of Parliament in 1986.

Damanaki was a candidate for mayor of Athens twice, in 1994, supported by Synaspismos, and in 1998, supported by both Synaspismos and PASOK; in the latter year she came second, defeated by Dimitris Avramopoulos, supported by the conservative party of New Democracy.

=== European Commissioner, 2010–2014 ===
In November 2009 Damanaki was nominated as the representative of Greece in the European Commission and on 27 November 2009 was elected as the Commissioner-designate for Maritime Affairs and Fisheries, serving from 2010 to 2014. She served for four years as European Union Commissioner for Maritime Affairs and Fisheries.

In her role as Commissioner, the EU was able to bring fish populations back to healthier levels—from five sustainable stocks in 2010 to up to 27 in 2014. In just the next five years, the continuation of her fisheries policy efforts could lead to 15 million more tons of fish in the sea, 30 percent more jobs in Europe and the equivalent of over US$2 billion in additional revenue. She also introduced and implemented the Blue Growth agenda for Seas and Oceans in Europe, which aimed to create 1.6 million new jobs and the equivalent of US$750 billion in revenue by 2020 in sectors such as coastal tourism, ocean energy, and marine biotechnology. In addition, she established legislation to create a common framework for Marine Spatial Planning to map and better manage maritime activities across EU countries.

=== Writings ===
Damanaki is also the writer of four books "The female face of power" (Το θηλυκό πρόσωπο της εξουσίας) in 1995, "The return of Politics" (Η επιστροφή της Πολιτικής) in 2001, "The return of politics – the European perspective" in 2004, and "The university in transition" in 2006.

== Other activities ==
- European Council on Foreign Relations (ECFR), Member

== See also ==
- Politics of Greece

Party political offices
Preceded by Charilaos Florakis	Chairperson of Synaspismós; 1991–1993	Succeeded by Nikos Konstantopoulos
Political offices
Preceded by Stavros Dimas	Greek European Commissioner; 2010–2014	Succeeded by Dimitris Avramopoulos
Preceded by Joe Borg as European Commissioner for Fisheries and Maritime Affairs	European Commissioner for Maritime Affairs and Fisheries; 2010–2014	Succeeded by Karmenu Vella as European Commissioner for the Environment, Maritime Affairs and Fisheries
