= List of Greek coups d'état =

The Hellenic Armed Forces have intervened on numerous occasions in the political history of Greece.

This article lists coups d'état that have taken place in the history of modern Greece:

== 19th century ==
- 1831 Greek coup d'état attempt, a naval mutiny organized by Andreas Miaoulis against the government of Ioannis Kapodistrias, leading to the burning of the fleet on 13 August in the port of Poros;
- In 1831, after the assassination of Kapodistrias, a revolt against his brother Augustinos forced the Senate to take refuge in Astros;
- 3 September 1843 Revolution, which forced King Otto to grant Greece its first Constitution;
- 23 October 1862 Revolution, leading to the departure of King Otto and his queen, first step towards the 1862 Greek head of state referendum which resulted in Prince William of Denmark becoming George I, the King of the Hellenes;

== 20th century ==
- On 15 August 1909, the Goudi coup was staged against the government of Dimitrios Rallis, which brought Eleftherios Venizelos to the Greek political scene;
- On 17 August 1916, the National Defence coup d'état of Venizelos supporters in Thessaloniki led to the establishment of the Provisional Government of National Defence;
- On 20 November 1921, protested Cretan fans of Eleftherios Venizelos for the Gounari's government draft about the Minor Asia's campaign will fight with the army at Chania unsuccessfully;
- 11 September 1922 Revolution, led by Colonels Nikolaos Plastiras and Stylianos Gonatas and Commander Dimitrios Phokas, culminating in the abdication of King Constantine I;
- Leonardopoulos–Gargalidis coup d'état attempt on 22 October 1923 (11 October O.S.), led by the royalist officers;
- 1925 Greek coup d'état on 25 June 1925, which brought General Theodoros Pangalos to power;
- 1926 Greek coup d'état on 22 August 1926, overthrow of General Pangalos by General Georgios Kondylis;
- 1933 Greek coup d'état attempt on 6 March 1933, led by republican General Nikolaos Plastiras;
- 1935 Greek coup d'état attempt on 1 March 1935, led by General Plastiras and Venizelos;
- 1935 Greek coup d'état on 10 October 1935, led by General Kondylis, signalling the end of the Second Hellenic Republic and leading to the restoration of King George II to the throne, according to a referendum;
- On 4 August 1936, General Ioannis Metaxas established the 4th of August Regime;
- 1938 Greek coup d'état attempt on 28 July 1938, attempted rebellion in Crete against the 4th of August Regime;
- On 31 May 1951, attempted coup d'état of a group of right-wing officers named Sacred Link of Greek Officers (IDEA);
- 1967 Greek coup d'état on 21 April 1967, a group of right-wing army officers led by Brigadier General Stylianos Pattakos and Colonels Georgios Papadopoulos and Nikolaos Makarezos, established the Regime of the Colonels;
- 1967 Greek counter-coup attempt on 13 December 1967, led by King Constantine II against the Regime of the Colonels. The failure of the counter-coup forced the King to leave Greece definitively;
- The Velos mutiny on 23 May 1973 against the Regime of the Colonels. The crew of the destroyer HNS Velos (D-16), under the command of Nikolaos Pappas, demanded political asylum in Italy, while the rest of the mutiny in Greek territory is suppressed;
- 1973 Greek coup d'état on 25 November 1973, in the aftermath of the Athens Polytechnic uprising. The coup resulted in overthrow of Colonel Papadopoulos by hardliners around General Dimitrios Ioannidis;
- Pyjamas coup on 24 February 1975, attempt by certain officers to overthrow the government of Konstantinos Karamanlis.

== Gallery ==
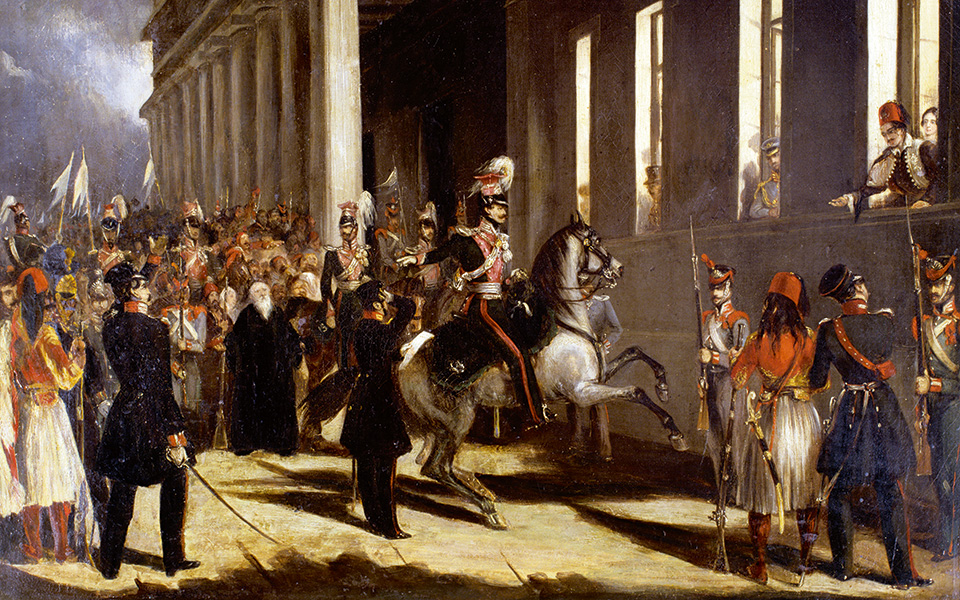
3 September 1843 Revolution.

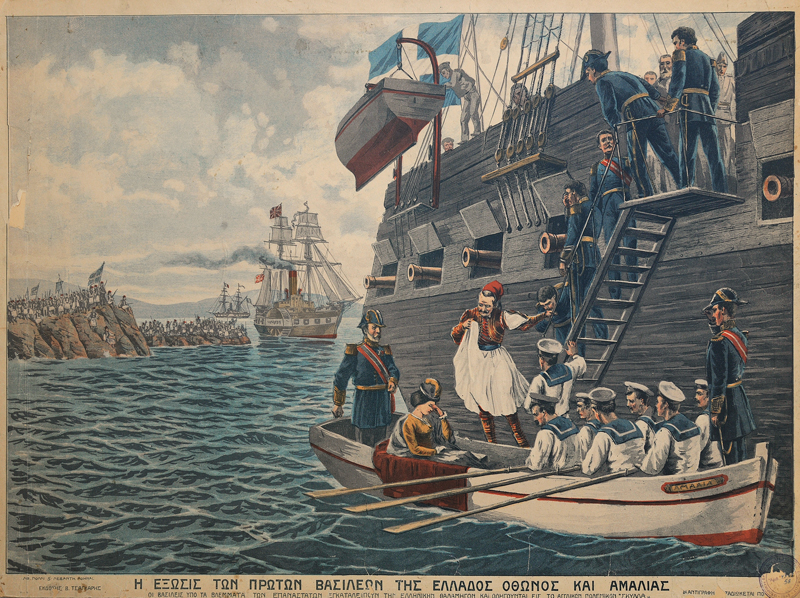
The expulsion of King Otto and Queen Amalia during the 23 October 1862 Revolution, as portrayed in a popular colour lithography.

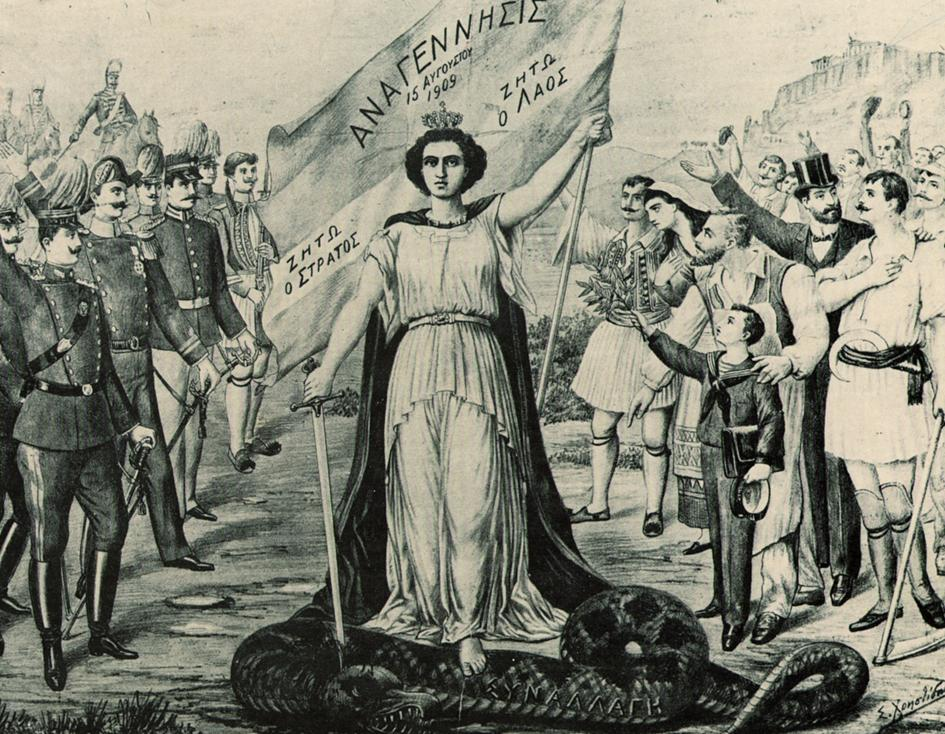
Lithography celebrating the Goudi coup.

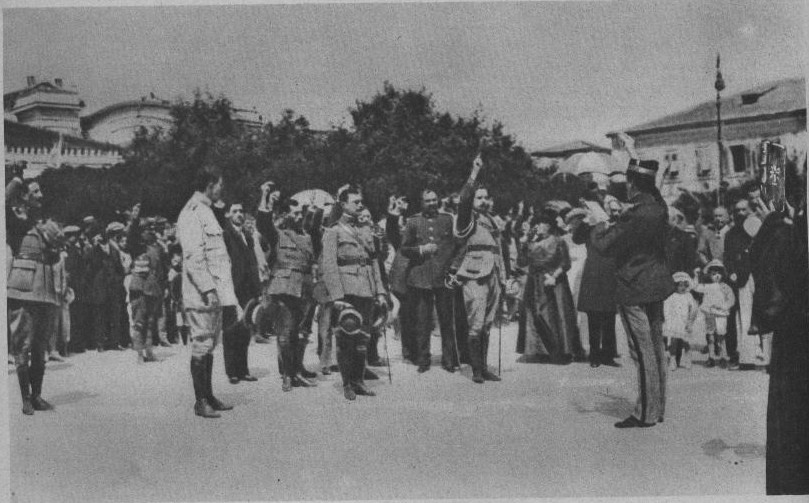
Colonel Mavroudis swears in officers and troops loyal to Venizelos and to the Provisional Government of National Defence, photo published in Le Miroir, 17 June 1917.

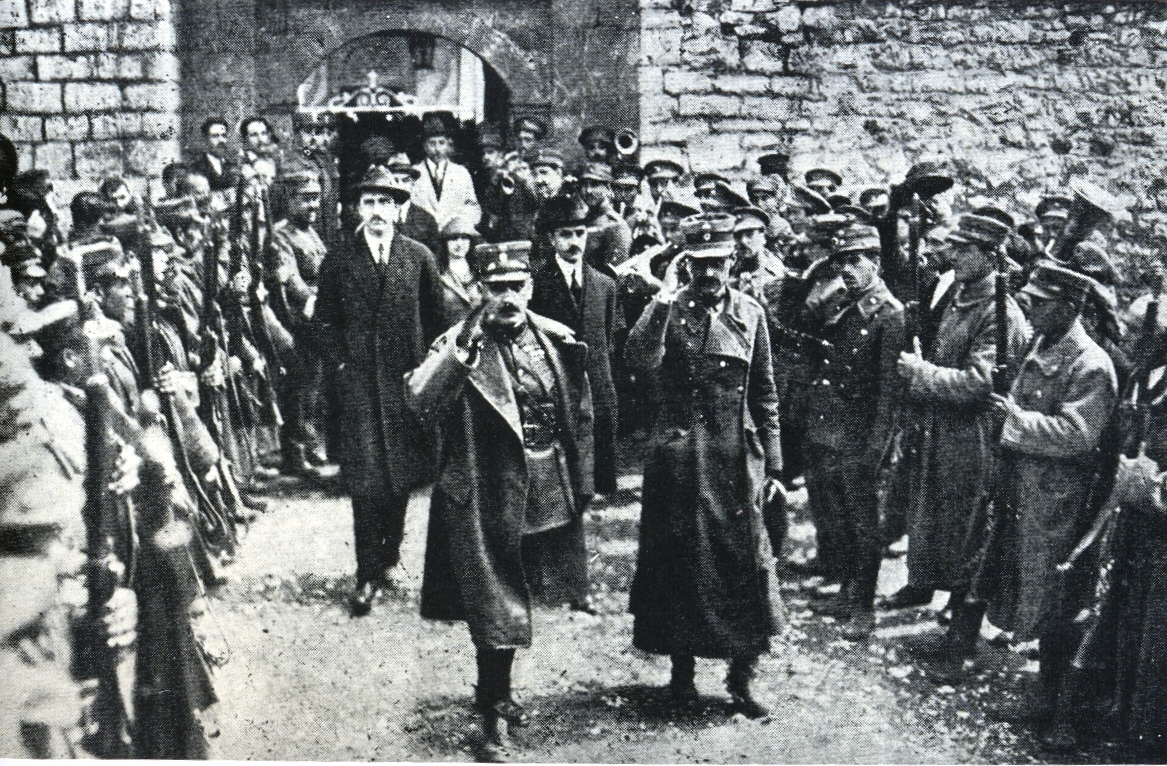
Colonels Plastiras and Gonatas with Georgios Papandreou (left, in black civilian clothes) during the 11 September 1922 Revolution, in Mousounitsa.

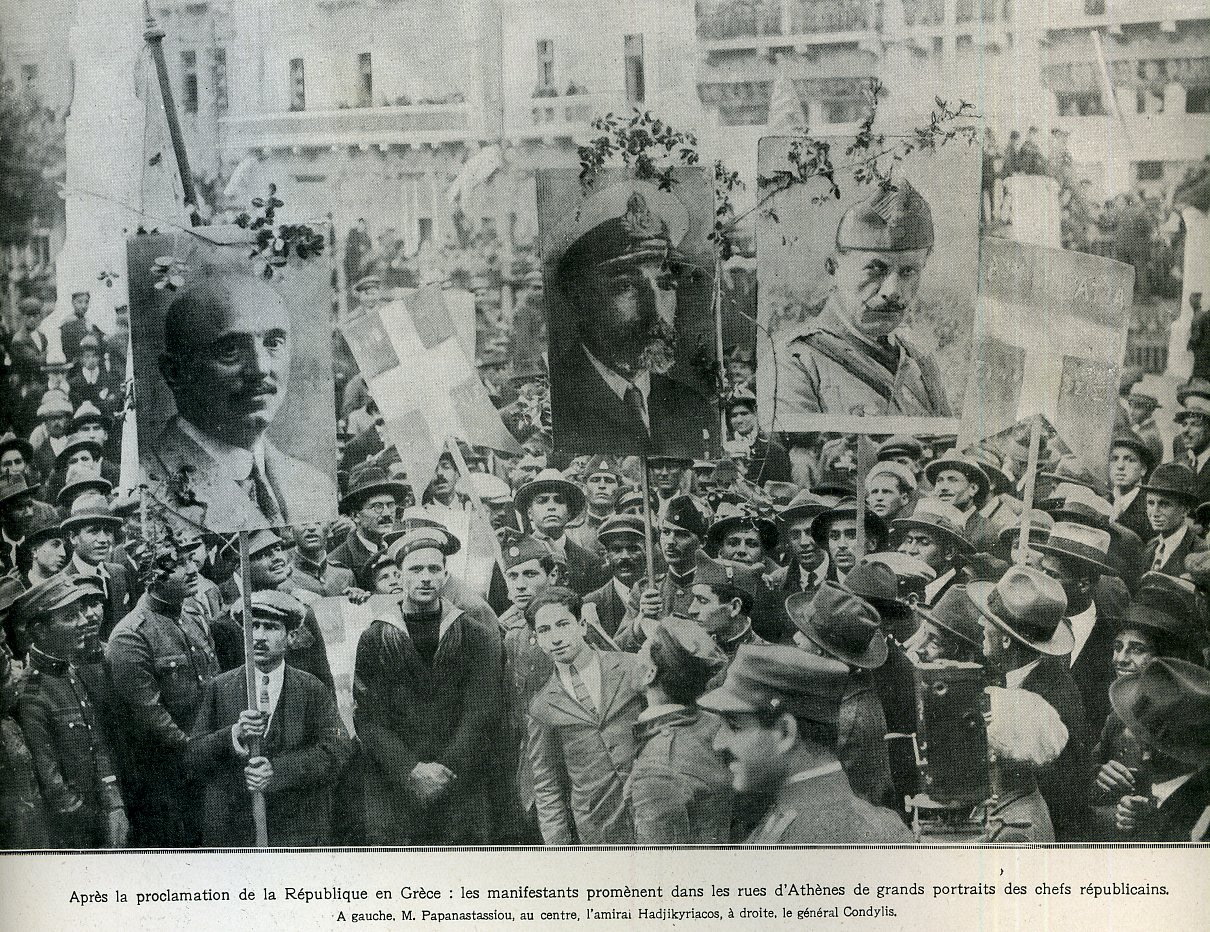
Proclamation of the Second Hellenic Republic. Crowds holding placards depicting Prime Minister Alexandros Papanastasiou and the Republican military leaders, Admiral Alexandros Hatzikyriakos and Colonel Georgios Kondylis. Photo published in L'Illustration, 12 April 1924.

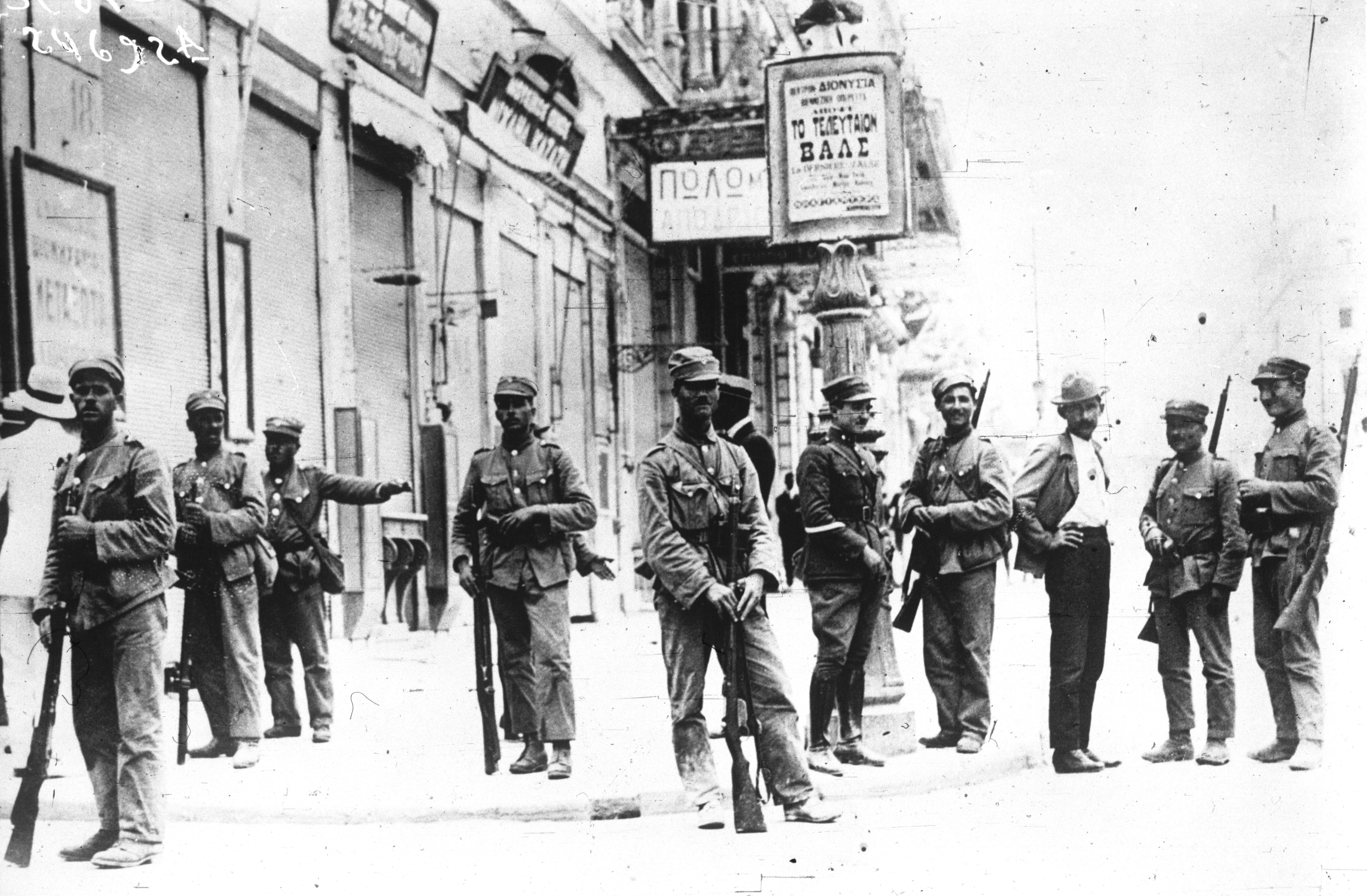
Soldiers on the streets of Athens during Pangalos' 1925 coup d'état.

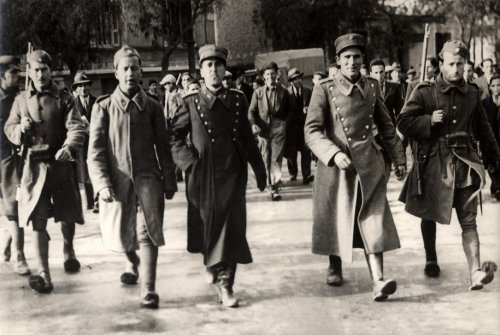
Rebel Venizelist officers under guard during the suppression of the March 1935 coup d'état attempt.

== See also ==
- List of coups d'état and coup attempts
- List of coups d'état and coup attempts by country
- 4th of August Regime
- Greek military junta of 1967–74
- 1974 Cypriot coup d'état

== Bibliography ==
- Colovas, Anthone C. A Quick History of Modern Greece (2007) excerpt and text search
- Gallant, Thomas W. Modern Greece (Brief Histories) (2001)
- Herzfeld, Michael. Ours Once More: Folklore, Ideology and the Making of Modern Greece (1986) excerpt and text search
- Kalyvas, Stathis. Modern Greece: What Everyone Needs to Know (Oxford University Press, 2015)
- Keridis, Dimitris. Historical Dictionary of Modern Greece (2009) excerpt and text search
- Koliopoulos, John S., and Thanos M. Veremis. Modern Greece: A History since 1821 (2009) excerpt and text search
- Miller, James E. The United States and the Making of Modern Greece: History and Power, 1950-1974 (2008) excerpt and text search
- Woodhouse, C. M. Modern Greece: A Short History (2000) excerpt and text search
