= Kostas Koligiannis =

Kostas Koligiannis (Greek: Κώστας Κολιγιάννης, July 26, 1909 – September 5, 1979) was a Greek politician who served as the General Secretary of the Communist Party of Greece (KKE) in exile, from 1956 until 1972.

Born in Ellopia, Boeotia, Greece, he studied law at the University of Athens, and was an active participant in the Greek Civil War of 1946–49, especially in the region of Epirus.

He became leader of the KKE in 1956, with backing from Khrushchev as a supporter of De-Stalinization, although most party members at the time were actually supporters of maintaining the previous political line. He led the party until 1972.

He died in Budapest, Hungary, in 1979.
