= Panagiotis Markopoulos =

Greek politician

Panagiotis Markopoulos (Greek: Παναγιώτης Μαρκόπουλος) (1916–1996) was a Greek politician. He was three times Minister of the Interior of Greece (1984, 1985, 1989). He was acting minister of public order (1989).

Preceded by Menios Koutsogiorgas	Minister of the Interior of Greece; 1984	Succeeded by Menios Koutsogiorgas
Preceded by Menios Koutsogiorgas	Minister of the Interior of Greece; 1985	Succeeded by Menios Koutsogiorgas
Preceded by Akis Tsochatzopoulos	Minister of the Interior of Greece; 1989	Succeeded by Nikos Konstantopoulos
Preceded by Apostolos Tsochatzopoulos	Minister of Public Order of Greece; 1989 (acting)	Succeeded by Ioannis Kefalogiannis
