= Menios Koutsogiorgas =

Greek politician (1922–1991)

Agamemnon Koutsogiorgas (Greek: Αγαμέμνων Κουτσόγιωργας; 1922 – 18 April 1991), commonly known as Menios Koutsogiorgas (Μένιος Κουτσόγιωργας), was a Greek lawyer, police officer and politician. As a close associate of Andreas Papandreou, the founder and leader of the Panhellenic Socialist Movement (PASOK), Koutsogiorgas emerged as one of the most powerful cabinet members during PASOK's 1981–1989 government and was widely regarded as Papandreou's heir apparent. Embroiled in the Koskotas scandal, however, he was brought before a Special Tribunal. During the procedure, he collapsed in the courtroom on 11 April 1991 and died a week later.

== Early life and professional career ==
Koutsogiorgas was born in May 1922 in the village of Rodini in Achaea. During the Axis Occupation of Greece in the Second World War, Koutsogiorgas was active in the Omiros resistance group, and was arrested and imprisoned by the Italian occupation authorities. He studied at the Law School of the University of Athens, and received his law degree in 1945. That same year, he became a police officer in the Athens branch of the City Police. He served as a police officer for seven years, until he resigned in 1952, in order to become a lawyer and open his own law firm. In 1958 he obtained a postgraduate degree in Public Law from the Law Faculty of the University of Paris.

In the post-war era, he became a prominent Athens lawyer, and was closely associated with Georgios Papandreou, the leader of the Liberal Party and later of the Centre Union. During the ASPIDA scandal of 1965, he was defence attorney to the Georgios Papandreou's son, Andreas Papandreou.

During the Greek military junta of 1967–1974, Koutsogiorgas participated in attempts to organize armed resistance against the regime as early as 1967, and was arrested and imprisoned after arms and radio transmitters were discovered at his home. He was later released, but re-arrested in 1970 and held for a while, undergoing interrogation by the infamous EAT-ESA.

== Political career ==
As a close associate of Andreas Papandreou, Koutsogiorgas became a founding member of the Panhellenic Socialist Movement (PASOK) during the metapolitefsi.

He was elected Member of Parliament in the first national election that took place in November 1974 after the fall of the military government. He held a parliament seat for the prefecture of Achaea in all successive national elections until 1989. In the first PASOK cabinet, Koutsogiorgas was appointed Minister to the Presidency of the Government on 21 October 1981, a post he held until 17 January 1984, when he was named Minister for the Interior. He held the post until resigning on 9 May 1985 before the parliamentary elections, with the exception of the period 22 May – 21 June 1984, when he was replaced by an acting minister for the European Parliament election. During this time he played a major role in the March 1985 political crisis over the issue of the re-nomination of then-President of Greece Constantine Karamanlis for a second term. Papandreou had promised it several times, but the PASOK party base and Koutsogiorgas himself fiercely opposed it. Eventually, largely through Koutsogiorgas insistence PASOK proposed the judge Christos Sartzetakis for the post.

Following PASOK's electoral victory in the 1985 election, Koutsogiorgas was re-appointed Interior Minister on 5 June 1985. In the reshuffle of 26 July 1985, he assumed the Public Order portfolio as well, keeping it until 25 April 1986. He remained Interior Minister until 5 February 1987, and on 23 September 1987, he was appointed Vice-president of the Government and Minister for Justice. While popular with the broader PASOK electorate but lacking a strong party base, this appointment made him the de facto number two in the government. During Papandreou's illness in 1988 and his absence from Greece in August–September for a heart bypass operation in the United Kingdom Koutsogiorgas functioned as the virtual Prime Minister.

At the same time however, he came under increasing criticism from the press and from within PASOK for his handling of the George Koskotas and his Bank of Crete scandal, in particular over a bank secrecy law that according to some critics would allow Koskotas to evade scrutiny. He continued to enjoy the support of Papandreou: although he was forced to quit the posts of vice-president of the Government and Justice Minister on 18 November 1988, he was re-appointed as Minister to the Presidency of the Government. The mounting crisis peaked in March 1989, when audio tapes of conversations between Koskotas's wife and an associate of Koskotas (I.Matzouranis) were released by Koskotas who was already a fugitive and imprisoned in the US. The tapes purported to show that Koutsogiogras had received 2 million US dollars in a Swiss bank account for "tailoring" the bank secrecy law for Koskotas. Koutsogiorgas, denied these claims and accused Koskotas for attempting to blackmail the government at a time he was a fugitive from Greek law and government actions caused his fraudulent empire to crumble. Papandreou survived a vote of confidence in parliament, but Koutsogiorgas submitted his resignation on 16 March 1989. The subsequent investigation showed that a close associate of Koskotas, I. Matzouranis, which used to be a member of the PASOK government and was connected with Koutsogiorgas had mediated in the fall of 1988 to open a bank account for Koutsogiorgas in Switzerland. After a couple of weeks he made a deposit of $1,2 million in that account. A few weeks later, Koutsogiorgas aware of the deposit turned the funds back to Matzouranis and closed the account. When those events were revealed in March 1989 Matzouranis claimed Koutsogiorgas was expecting the deposit. Koutsogiorgas claimed that the account was opened for personal reasons and that the specific deposit was an attempt to get him entrapped by Koskotas and Matzouranis at a critical juncture of the Koskotas case when his illegal activities were exposed. The details of these events remained unexamined as Koutsogiorgas died while defending himself during the proceedings in court.

On 18 May, the PASOK Central Committee voted against him standing as a candidate during the June 1989 parliamentary elections until the investigation on the Bank of Crete case was complete. On 27 September, in a Parliament vote Koutsogiorgas along with Andreas Papandreou, Dimitris Tsovolas and Giorgos Petsos were sent to a Special Tribunal set up to investigate the Koskotas scandal. In a move that at the time was criticized as politicized and excessive, the 68-year-old Koutsogiorgas, alone among the accused, was placed into pre-trial custody at Korydallos prison on 2 October 1990. The move was supported by the new Mitsotakis (ND) government who had been elected just a few months before on a ticket of battling alleged corruption by the Socialist party. Koutsogiorgas immediately appealed this decision, taking his case to the Athens Appellate Court's Appeals Council; his appeal was successful, and he was released from pre-trial detention and set free on 10 January 1991.

The trial began in a heavily politicized atmosphere on 11 March 1991, broadcast on live television. Koutsogiorgas stood his ground and his examination of prosecution witness Ioannis Kamaras (chief auditor of the Bank of Greece) exposed many flaws in the prosecution's case. On 11 April, while examining a witness (Stathis Papageorgiou, former Deputy Governor of the Bank of Greece), Koutsogiorgas collapsed in the courtroom and died seven days later. His funeral gathered large crowds in the center of Athens and developed into a political protest against the continuing proceedings of the Special Tribunal. The later was seen by a large part of the press and the population as politically motivated and a result of partisan politics.

== Family ==
Menios Koutsogiorgas was married to Aliki Koutsogiorga and had three children. His brother, Praxitelis (Telis) Koutsogiorgas was a General of the Greek Gendarmerie.

== Honours and decorations ==
- Grand Officer of the Ordre national du Mérite, French Republic
- Grand Decoration of Honour in Gold with Sash (Großes Goldenes Ehrenzeichen am Bande), Republic of Austria
- Knight of the Order of Prince Henry (Ordem do Infante Dom Henrique), Republic of Portugal
- Commandery with Star of the Order of Merit of the People's Republic of Poland
- Order of the Nile, Arab Republic of Egypt
- Grand Cross of the Republic of Cyprus
- Grand Cross of the Ecumenical Patriarch of Constantinople
- Medal for the National Resistance (1941–44), Hellenic Republic

Political offices
Preceded by Konstantinos Stephanopoulos	Minister to the Presidency of the Government; 21 October 1981 – 17 January 1984	Succeeded by Apostolos Lazaris
Preceded by Georgios Gennimatas	Minister for the Interior; 17 January – 22 May 1984	Succeeded by Panagiotis Markopoulos (interim minister)
Preceded by Panagiotis Markopoulos (interim minister)	Minister for the Interior; 22 May 1984 – 9 May 1985	Succeeded by Panagiotis Markopoulos (interim minister)
Preceded by Panagiotis Markopoulos (interim minister)	Minister for the Interior; 5 June 1985 – 5 February 1987	Succeeded by Emmanouil Papastefanakis
Preceded by Athanasios Tsouras	Minister for Public Order; 26 July 1985 – 25 April 1986	Succeeded by Antonis Drosogiannis
Preceded by Ioannis Charalambopoulos	Deputy Prime Minister of Greece; 23 September 1987 – 18 November 1988 (with Ioannis Charalambopoulos)	Vacant Title next held by Tzannis Tzannetakis and Athanasios Kanellopoulos (in the 1990–1993 Mitsotakis cabinet)
Preceded by Eleftherios Veryvakis	Minister for Justice; 23 September 1987 – 18 November 1988	Succeeded by Vasileios Rotis
Preceded by Apostolos Kaklamanis	Minister to the Presidency of the Government; 18 November 1988 – 16 March 1989	Succeeded by Anastasios Peponis
