= Tombras Group =

Advertising Group

Charles Tombras Advertising, Inc.
- Trade name: The Tombras Group
- Formerly: Charles Tombras & Associates
- Company type: Privately held company
- Industry: Advertising
- Founded: 1946
- Founder: Charles Tombras, Sr.
- Headquarters: Knoxville, Tennessee, United States of America
- Number of locations: 5 (2018)
- Area served: United States
- Key people: Charles Tombras, Jr.; Chairman; Dooley Tombras; President; Alice Matthews; Chief Executive Officer
- Services: Advertising, Marketing, Digital Media, Social Media, Branding, Media Buying, Public Relations
- Number of employees: 300 (2020)
- Website: www.tombras.com

Tombras is a full service advertising agency founded in 1946.

With annual billings of $270 million, Tombras is one of the top 25 largest independent national advertising agencies. Tombras is headquartered in Knoxville, Tennessee with offices in Washington, D.C., New York, New York, Atlanta, Georgia and Charlotte, North Carolina. Tombras provides advertising, marketing, public relations, analytics, and content development services. Tombras is a member of the American Association of Advertising Agencies (AAAA).

== History ==
The company was founded by Charles Tombras Sr. in 1946, dba Charles Tombras & Associates. By the 1960s, notable clients included the Tennessee Valley Authority and AAMCO Transmissions.

Charles Tombras Jr. joined the firm in 1966 after he returned from a tour of duty in Vietnam.

When the senior Tombras retired in 1982, Charles Jr. took over as president, in 2018 he became chairman. Under his leadership, the Tombras Group has grown from 25 to over 300 employees.

In June 2017, Tombras Group created a new division to work with Amazon's search and display functions, and hired Marketplace Ignition's Kevin Packler to lead the group as Vice President. Charles Jr.'s son, Dooley Tombras is the third-generation of Tombras family leadership, and in 2018 became president.

In 2019, the firm opened offices in Atlanta and Manhattan.

In February 2021, Tombras was named agency of record for the American Cancer Society.

In 2022, the University of Tennessee, Knoxville, announced that they were creating the Tombras School of Advertising and Public Relations within the existing College of Communication and Information.

== Notable campaigns ==
=== Click It or Ticket / Drive Sober / Distracted Driving ===
Since 2004 Tombras has launched annual campaigns for the National Highway Traffic Safety Administration using the “Click It or Ticket” message.

Additionally for NHTSA, Tombras developed the "Drive Sober or Get Pulled Over" campaign to combat impaired driving as well as the distracted driving campaign to communicate the dangers of distracted driving.

=== McDonald's ===
Working with McDonald's since 1972, Tombras is one of the chain's longest tenured agency partners. Tombras has developed notable national campaigns, including those for new product launches like Chicken McNuggets, Mickey D's Sweet Tea, and Scratch-Made Biscuits.

== Recognition ==
- February 2018 – Fast Company named The Tombras Group one of their Top 10 most innovative companies in Social Media.
- July 2015 – Tombras Group won the Silver medal for National Agency of the Year for agencies with 76-150 employees at the 2015 Advertising Age Small Agency Awards.
- April 2014 – Adweek named a Tombras Group distracted driving TV commercial the number one TV spot in the world for the April 4th - 11th time period.

== Personnel ==
Charles Tombras was the agency's founder.

Tombras Group Chairman Charles Tombras Jr., the son of the founder Charles Tombras, was commissioned after his graduation from the University of Tennessee (UT), where he was enrolled as a Reserve Officers' Training Corps (ROTC) cadet. He served a tour of duty in Vietnam, where he commanded a platoon in the 1st Battalion (Airborne), 8th Cavalry Regiment ("Jumping Mustangs"), was awarded the Bronze Star, Bronze Star for Valor, and Air Medal, and attained the rank of 1st Lieutenant. He remains a notable supporter of UT, having created the Charles Tombras Memorial Scholarship in the school's College of Communications & Information. His service to the university was recognized with the awarding of its 2013 Donald G. Hileman Alumni Award. In February 2021, when the firm won the American Cancer Society account, his son Dooley, the firm's President at the time, acknowledged that Tombras Jr. had been undergoing cancer treatment for 20 years.

Dooley Tombras serves as the company's president, as of February 2021. In June 2018, he was listed on the Adweek Creative 100.
