= Merbaka =

Greek village

Agia Triada (Merbakas) Αγία Τριάδα (Μέρμπακας)
- Community
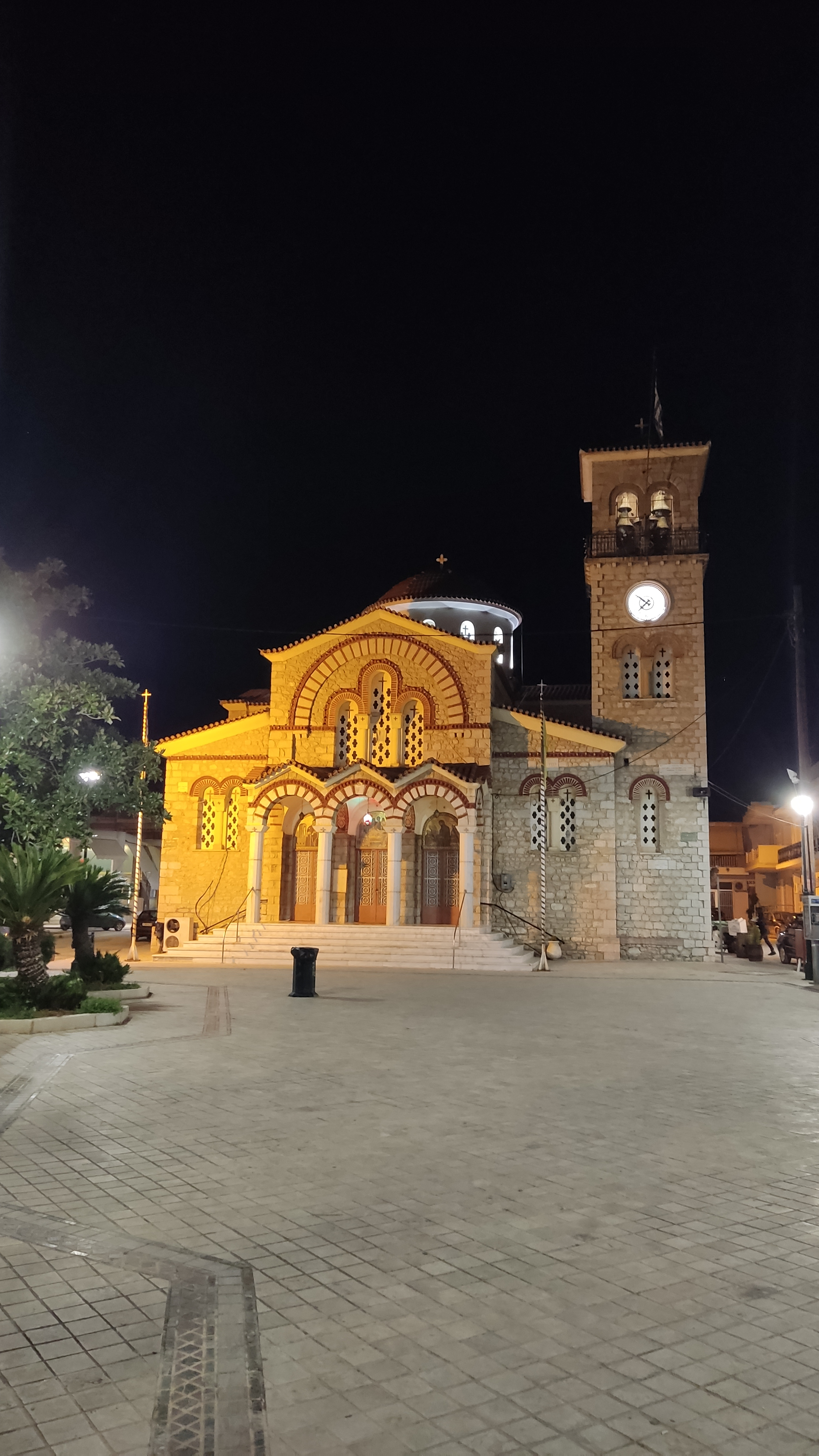
- The church of the Holy Trinity in the village square

- Location within Greece
- Coordinates: 37°38′N 22°48′E
- Country: Greece
- Administrative region: Peloponnese
- Regional unit: Argolis
- Municipality: Nafplio
- Municipal unit: Midea
- Elevation: 30 m (98 ft)

Population (2021)
  - Community: 999
- Time zone: UTC+2 (EET)
  - Summer (DST): UTC+3 (EEST)
- Postal code: 21055
- Area code: 02752
- Vehicle registration: ΑΡ

Merbaka (Greek: (το) Μέρμπακα (n.) or Greek: (ο) Μέρμπακας, romanized: Merbakas (m.)) is a village and local community of the municipal unit of Midea, in the municipality of Nafplio, in the regional unit of Argolis, in the Peloponnese region.

== Name ==
Merbaka is the village's traditional name, but officially it is called Agia Trias (Greek: Αγία Τριάς) in Katharevousa, or Greek: Αγία Τριάδα, romanized: Agia Triada in Demotic). The village was officially renamed on December 29, 1953, in keeping with a broader program of Hellenization of geographical names in Greece.

While the village was considered historically to be inhabited by Arvanites who speak Arvanitika, today it is considered more assimilated, in comparison to the Arvanitika villages of Midea and Manesis.

Merbaka is thought to have been named for William of Moerbeke, a 13th-century Roman Catholic archbishop of Corinth, scholar and Philhellene from Flanders. A roughly contemporaneous Byzantine-Gothic Church of the Dormition of the Mother of God (Greek: Ναός της Κοίμησις Θεοτόκου, popularly known as Παναγία της Βούζης, Panagia tis Bouzis, "Our Lady of Bouzis") in the village may have been built under his auspices. The church's popular name is held to have come from a prominent Lemnian family of landowners who donated the land for a mediaeval monastery nearby; their name and social position is attested by contemporaneous documents with the seal of Michael VII Doukas. The monastery was sited further inland from its existing twin, the Monastery of Areias near Nafplio – popularly known as "The Holy Mountain" — to protect the monks and ecclesiastical property from piratical raiding.

Merbaka's official name likely stems from the inclusion of three "saints" on a re-used Classical pediment on the thirteenth-century church: villagers likely interpreted these figures as a representation of the Holy Trinity, and unofficially renamed the church to reflect this; in time, the name was applied to the new church, and later, to the village itself. The older church includes other recycled antiquities like a Roman dedication, in Latin, to Quintus Caecilius Metellus Creticus, a Roman proconsul in Greece who was noted for his suppression of piracy.

== History ==
From the end of the Sixth Ottoman-Venetian War to 1770, when it was attacked by bandits, Merbaka was the seat of the Orthodox Metropolis of Nauplion and Argolis, due to the Venetian imposition of a Latin bishop at Argos.

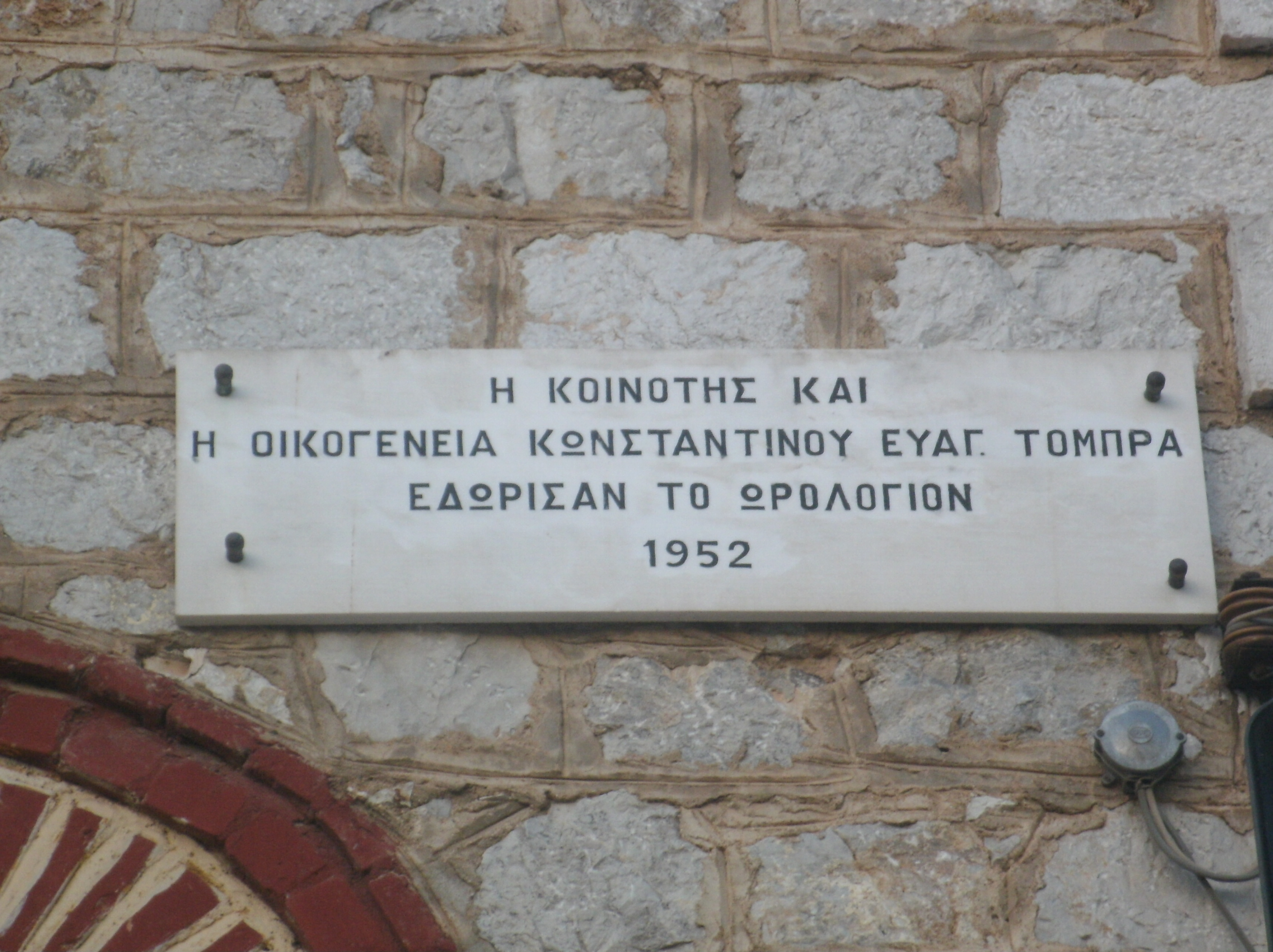
"The community and the family of Constantine Evangelos Tombras donated the clock 1952."

The modern church of the Holy Trinity, first erected in 1898, was torn down and rebuilt in 1934. A plaque on the front of the belltower says that the clock was donated in 1952.

Merbaka is part of the municipal unit of Midea. According to the 2001 Greek census, the village had a population of 1,267 inhabitants. Before the Kapodistrias plan, and the Kallikratis Programme, the village was part of the Nafplia Province in the nome (prefecture) of Argolis, in the geographic region of the Peloponnese.

== Notable people ==
- Theofanis Tombras - former general manager of OTE and alleged participant in the "Koskotas scandal", for which he was acquitted; born in Merbaka, he became engaged in the fruit-processing business in Argolis, which continued after his retirement from public life
