= Avriani =

Greek newspaper

- Type: Daily political newspaper
- Owner: Giorgos Kouris
- Founded: March 1980
- Ceased publication: October 2012
- Language: Greek
- Sister newspapers: Dimokratikos Logos (1986 - 1990)

Avriani was an afternoon daily political newspaper published in Athens and circulated nationwide. During the 1980s and the first half of the 1990s it was among the top-selling newspapers, sometimes surpassing even Ta Nea, which traditionally held the first place.

The newspaper was characterised by shifts in its political line, starting as a publication openly supporting PASOK and ending up on the side of Kostas Karamanlis and Alexis Tsipras, and by highly aggressive criticism of public figures, even going so far as to spread fake news. This character is described by the neologism ‘avrianism’, which characterises extreme populism in the press.

In October 2012 the newspaper closed down, following a walkout by unpaid workers and bankruptcy. A year later, in November 2013, George Kouris launched Kontra News as a continuation of Avriani.

== History ==
The newspaper was published in Athens in March 1980 by the brothers George and Makis Kouris, formerly publishers of local newspapers in Kefalonia. During the first three months of its circulation it was not distributed with the other newspapers and had almost zero circulation, thus it is not included in the data of the Athens Daily Newspaper Owners' Association (ΕΙΗΕΑ).

Its circulation soared to 50,000 sheets a day in July 1980, mainly because in that month, due to a printers' strike, only three newspapers were circulating: the left-wing party publications Rizospastis and I Avgi and Avriani, whose editorial and technical staff did not belong to the respective trade unions. The price of the newspaper was 5 drachmas, when the others were sold at 15 drachmas.

The Rallis government at the time tried to restrict the newspaper by prohibiting its sale at a reduced price and by imposing obstacles to its operation, such as the exclusion of its editors from the regular journalists' briefings. As a result, Avriani launched an unusual attack on New Democracy, in a style unprecedented for the time, culminating in allegations of tax evasion by the then Prime Minister's wife and mismanagement by then President of the Republic Konstantinos Karamanlis of Christina Onassis' donation to the Hellenic Navy. For these allegations, prosecutions were brought against the Kouris brothers, as editors of Avriani, who were eventually sentenced to prison for slander. Makis Kouris was sent to prison, but George Kouris fled abroad, from where he returned after the rise of PASOK to power and the exoneration of himself and his brother from the charges.

From the elections of 1981, the newspaper was completely identified with a specific group of PASOK cadres and mainly with Menios Koutsogiorgas, to the point that it was considered his personal newspaper. From the moment PASOK came to power in 1981, Avriani adopted the slogan: "The newspaper that humiliated a government and demolished a rotten regime of 50 years". Four years later and on the occasion of the election of Christos Sartzetakis as President of the Republic instead of Konstantinos Karamanlis, it changed it to: "The newspaper that demolished Karamanlism". Many years later, its motto was changed again to: "Independent political newspaper".

Other political, sports and art newspapers, including Avriani Macedonia-Thrace (1988-2014?), an edition of Avriani in Thessaloniki with independent content from the Athens edition and Dimokratikos Logos, were subsequently added to the Kouris brothers' complex, while the company later expanded into the electronic media sector (Channel 5 - later Alter Channel). In the early 1990s, Makis Kouris left the publishing group.

== Avrianism ==
The newspaper benefited from Kyriakos Diakogiannis' expressive skills. Avriani generally played the role of public prosecutor, criticising the government and specific ministers harshly at times, but never concealed its close relations with leading PASOK leaders. This phenomenon became known as ‘Avrianism’, having taken on a political dimension as an expression of a trend among PASOK cadres and supporters. The harsh and aggressive style of the newspaper and its unprecedented editorial success provoked much debate and controversy among scholars of Greek politics. Some saw the phenomenon of Avrianism as a sign of a fascism that was completely harmful to Greek public life.

Before the 1985 elections, the newspaper published a front-page photo of the then leader of the opposition Konstantinos Mitsotakis, falsely presenting him as a Nazi collaborator during the Occupation, which caused tension in the political scene. In that month (May 1985), Avriani reached the peak of its circulation, selling on average 243,534 sheets every day (116,653 in Athens-Piraeus and 126,881 in the rest of Greece), one of the highest numbers in the history of the Athenian press.

In the following years, it was not limited to attacks on political figures, but also on people from the artistic world, such as Lakis Lazopoulos, Alexander Iolas, Loukianos Kilaidonis et al., while launching a scathing attack against Manos Hatzidakis. It even asked her readers to provide the newspaper with evidence "about the composer's qualities" (i.e. pertaining to his alleged homosexuality). In the case of Lazopoulos, the revelations of Avriani about a false psych conscription discharge, forced the artist to undergo his military service. Lazopoulos served a reduced 6-month service in 1987–88.

In late 1994, the newspaper's publisher tried to obtain a substantial loan from the National Bank of Greece, but his request was denied. In the autumn of 1995 it published on its front page nude photographs of Dimitra Liani-Papandreou in private moments, while from that period onwards the wider PASOK space began to distance itself from the newspaper.

== After 2000 ==
In the period after 2000, the newspaper appeared distanced from PASOK and its leadership, sometimes railing against the political system in general, while at other times supporting the government's choices and Kostas Karamanlis himself during his premiership. At times it seemed to provide support to emerging political groups, such as the then KEP of Dimitris Avramopoulos, while anti-Semitic headlines were not uncommon.

Its circulation had decreased significantly, not exceeding, during the 2000s, on a daily basis and on a nationwide level, 5,000 sheets. Its publisher promoted Greece's exit from the euro and return to the drachma. In the last weeks of 2011, the owner of Avriani George Kouris wrote controversial articles against the unpaid workers of Alter Channel. The article that angered the workers even more was the one of 28 December 2011, when the newspaper wrote in its front page that the Alter workers "pocketed" 82 billion drachmas.

The newspaper's employees, following the example of their colleagues at the Alter Channel television station, went on a work stoppage. The reason was the same as that of their colleagues at Alter, to get their accrued wages. The strike continued after October 2012, when George Kouris declared bankruptcy and closed the newspaper. However, a year later, in November 2013, Kouris launched Kontra News in place of Avriani.
