= Ellopia =

Coordinates: 38°54′00″N 23°09′26″E

Ellopia (Ἑλλοπία) or Hellopia (Ἕλλοπία) was a town and district of ancient Euboea, in the northwest of the island. Strabo reports a tradition that the town was founded by the mythical Ellops the son of Ion who may have been the brother of Aïclus and Cothus. Ellopia was in the territory of Oreus (previously named Histiaea) near the mountain Telethrius, and Ellops later added to his dominions Histiaea, Perias, Cerinthus, Aedepsus, and Orobia; in this last place was an oracle most averse to falsehood (it was an oracle of Apollo Selinuntius). The Ellopians migrated to Histiaea and enlarged the city, being forced to do so by Philistides the tyrant, after the Battle of Leuctra. In addition, the names Ellopia and Hellopia were applied to the entire island of Euboea at times.

Its site is tentatively located near the modern Kastaniotissa.
