= Bank of Crete (1980–1999) =

Defunct bank in Greece

The Bank of Crete (Greek: Τράπεζα Κρήτης) was a commercial bank in Greece that functioned from 1980 to 1999.

== History ==
George Koskotas bought the newly established Bank of Crete in 1984. At its height, the bank operated some 86 branches in all major Greek cities and a representative office in London. Koskotas and his bank were involved in a major corruption scandal in Greece in the late 1980s.

Specifically in November 1988, a shortfall of US$132 million was discovered in the Bank of Crete some months after bank chairman Koskotas, a Greek-American millionaire entrepreneur under investigation for large-scale financial crime, had fled the country. In the months that followed, alleged connections between Koskotas and the PASOK government, and even with prime minister Andreas Papandreou himself, brought the resignations of several ministers and demands for a vote of no confidence in the government. Papandreou was eventually acquitted of criminal charges relating to the scandal in 1992.

The Bank of Crete was sold to Eurobank Ergasias through privatization in 1999.

== See also ==
- List of banks in Greece
