= George Koskotas =

Greek businessman (born 1954)

- Born: October 5, 1954 (age 72); Aspropyrgos, Greece
- Occupations: Former banker and publisher
- Known for: Participation in Koskotas scandal

George Koskotas (Greek: Γιώργος Κοσκωτάς; born 5 October 1954, Aspropyrgos) is a Greek former banker and publisher whose ascension into a media magnate in the 1980s resulted in a financial scandal that brought down the PASOK government in 1989.

== Early life ==
Koskotas was born in Aspropyrgos, Greece on October 5, 1954. He emigrated to the United States with his parents in 1970 and worked for his father's house painting business in Queens, New York until 1979 when he returned to Greece. In 1980, Koskotas was indicted on charges of defrauding the Internal Revenue Service and the New York State unemployment office of $41,000 in a scheme to falsify unemployment insurance claims and obtain tax refunds from fictitious workers of his company. He was arrested on the charges in 1987 while he was attending a newspaper editors' convention in Washington D.C. He posted $1 million in bail and returned to Greece.

== "Koskotas scandal": Bank of Crete ==
In 1979, Koskotas joined the Bank of Crete as an administrative officer. From 1982 to 1984 he worked in the bank's central branch in Athens as an accountant. According to the investigation, Koskotas embezzled $210 million of the bank's funds into his own account, which he used to gain control of the bank, build a publishing business that included two daily newspapers in Athens, five magazines, and a radio station, and purchase Olympiacos F.C. Under Koskotas' leadership, the Bank of Crete grew from a small financial institution into the nation's second largest bank. Koskotas was arrested in the US for older crimes. From there, he claimed that prime minister Andreas Papandreou ordered state companies to deposit funds with the bank, and took bribes from stolen money.

Koskotas allegations against the Papandreou government resulted in the resignations of several ministers and demands for a vote of no confidence in the government. In 1989 a 13-judge court set up by parliament convicted two former cabinet ministers of involvement in the scandal. Papandreou was cleared of all charges by the Supreme Court in 1992 (with a 7 to 6 vote)

== Indictment and arrest in the United States ==
On October 20, 1988, Koskotas was indicted on five counts of forgery and embezzlement and was suspended from the position of bank chairman. On November 7, he eluded a 24-hour guard at his house and fled the country. He picked up his wife and five children in Switzerland. From there the Koskotas family went to Rio de Janeiro. On November 24, Koskotas and his family were apprehended by the Federal Bureau of Investigation in Bedford, Massachusetts after landing in a private jet at Hanscom Field. After his arrest, Koskotas was jailed at the Essex County Correctional Institution in Salem, Massachusetts. He was later transferred to Federal Correctional Institution, Danbury in Danbury, Connecticut.

After his arrest, Koskotas fought his extradition, arguing that the charges were political and that he would face assassination if returned to Greece. On August 24, 1989, United States magistrate judge Joyce Alexander ordered that Koskotas be extradited to Greece to face charges. Alexander's decision was upheld by United States district court judge Douglas Woodlock on June 27, 1990.

== Conviction and parole ==
In January 1992, Koskotas was convicted of forgery and sentenced to five years in prison. In November 1994 he was found guilty of embezzlement and forgery and sentenced to 25 years in prison. He was paroled and released from prison on March 16, 2001 after serving 12 years of his 25-year sentence. Koskotas is barred from leaving the country and was ordered to report to an Athens police precinct twice a month.

== Sources ==
- As of this edit, this article uses content from Phantis, a source licensed under the terms of the GNU Free Documentation License which was imported into Wikipedia before November 2008 and is therefore validly licensed for use on Wikipedia. All relevant terms must be followed. The original article was at "George Koskotas".
