= Pyjamas coup =

The Pyjamas coup (Greek: πραξικόπημα της πυτζάμας) was a failed coup d'etat attempt in February 1975 by far-right Greek Army officers sympathetic to the recently deposed (in July 1974) Greek junta. The Greek government, swiftly alerted by Major Ioannis Alexakis, the Security Director of the Central Intelligence Service, arrested the conspirators and subsequently carried out a massive purge of die-hard junta sympathizers in the Armed Forces, especially the Army.

The term "pyjamas coup" was coined by then-Defense Minister Evangelos Averoff, as most of the plotters were arrested at their homes sleeping, on the early morning hours of February 24, 1975. Averoff thus wanted to ridicule the plotters and at the same time reassure Greek public opinion of the government's hold on power.
