= Kaisariani =

Town in the Athens agglomeration, Greece

Kaisariani Καισαριανή
- Municipality
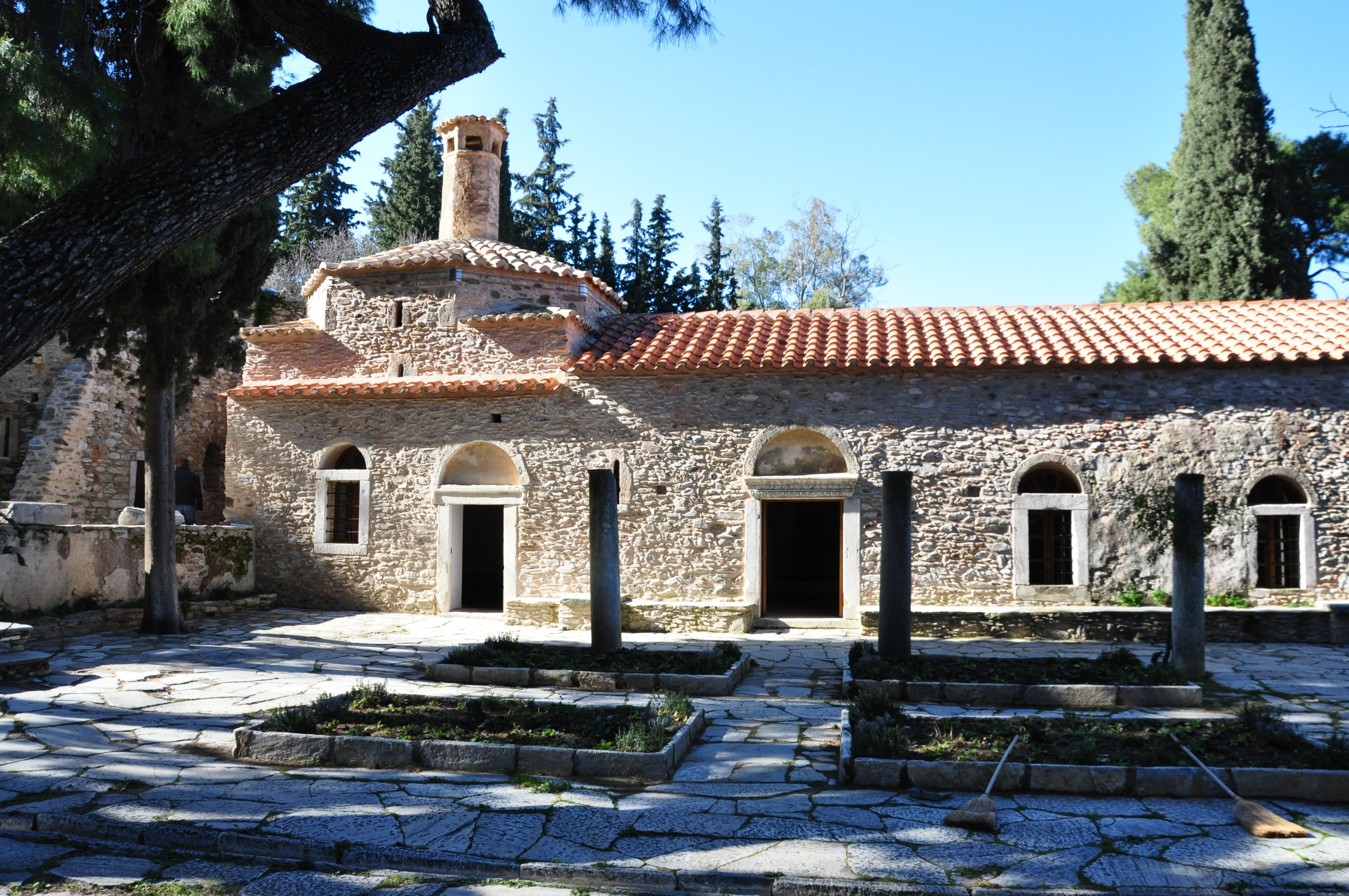
- Kaisariani Monastery

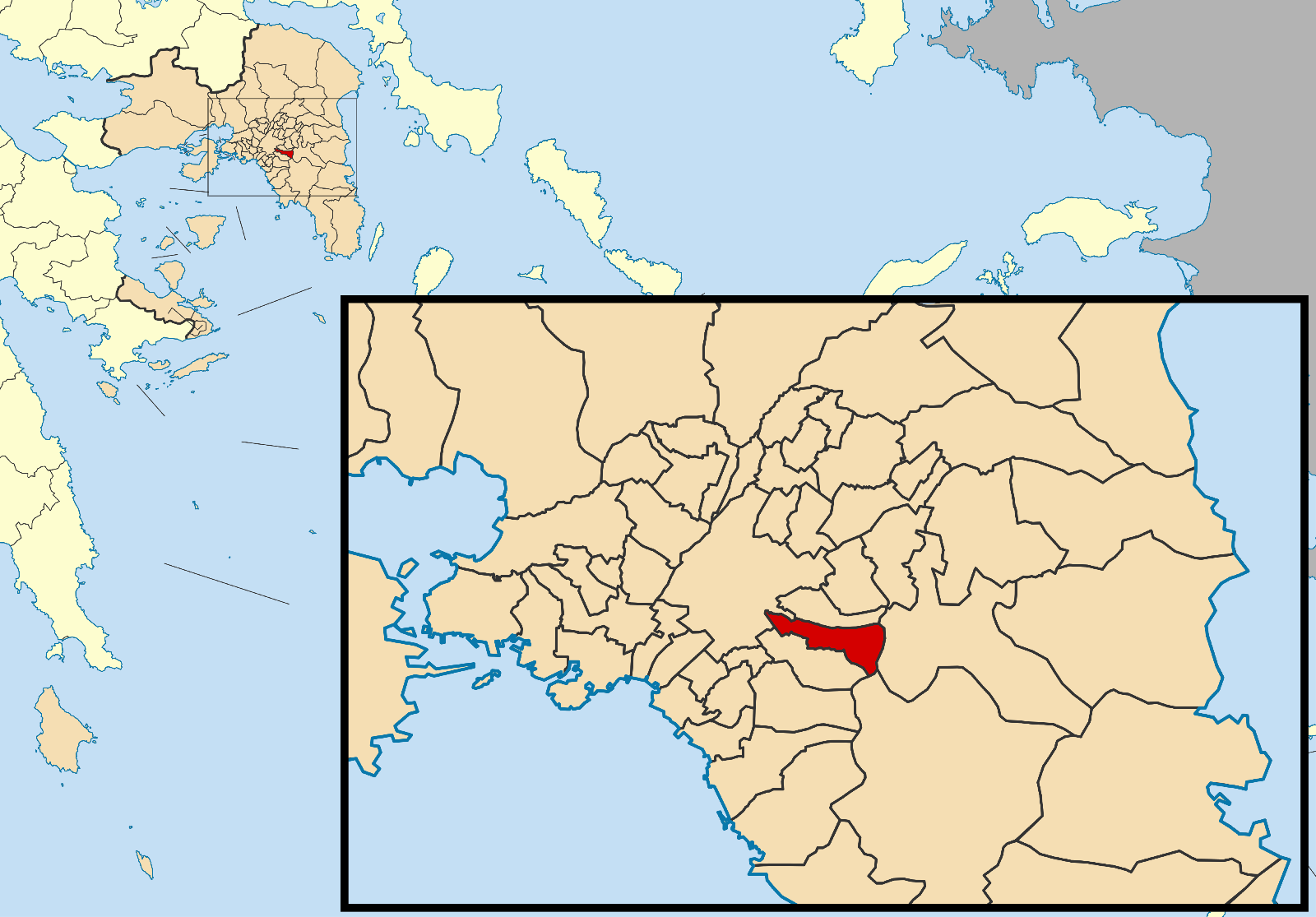

- Location within Greece
- Coordinates: 37°58.1′N 23°45.5′E
- Country: Greece
- Administrative region: Attica
- Regional unit: Central Athens
- City established: 1922 (104 years ago)
- Municipality established: 1933 (93 years ago)

Area
  - Municipality: 7.841 km^{2} (3.027 sq mi)
- Elevation: 130 m (430 ft)

Population (2021)
  - Municipality: 26,269
  - Density: 3,350/km^{2} (8,677/sq mi)
- Time zone: UTC+2 (EET)
  - Summer (DST): UTC+3 (EEST)
- Postal code: 161 21
- Area code: 210
- Vehicle registration: Z
- Website: www.kessariani.gr

Kaisariani (Greek: Καισαριανή) is a suburban town and a municipality in the eastern part of the Athens agglomeration in Greece.

== Geography ==
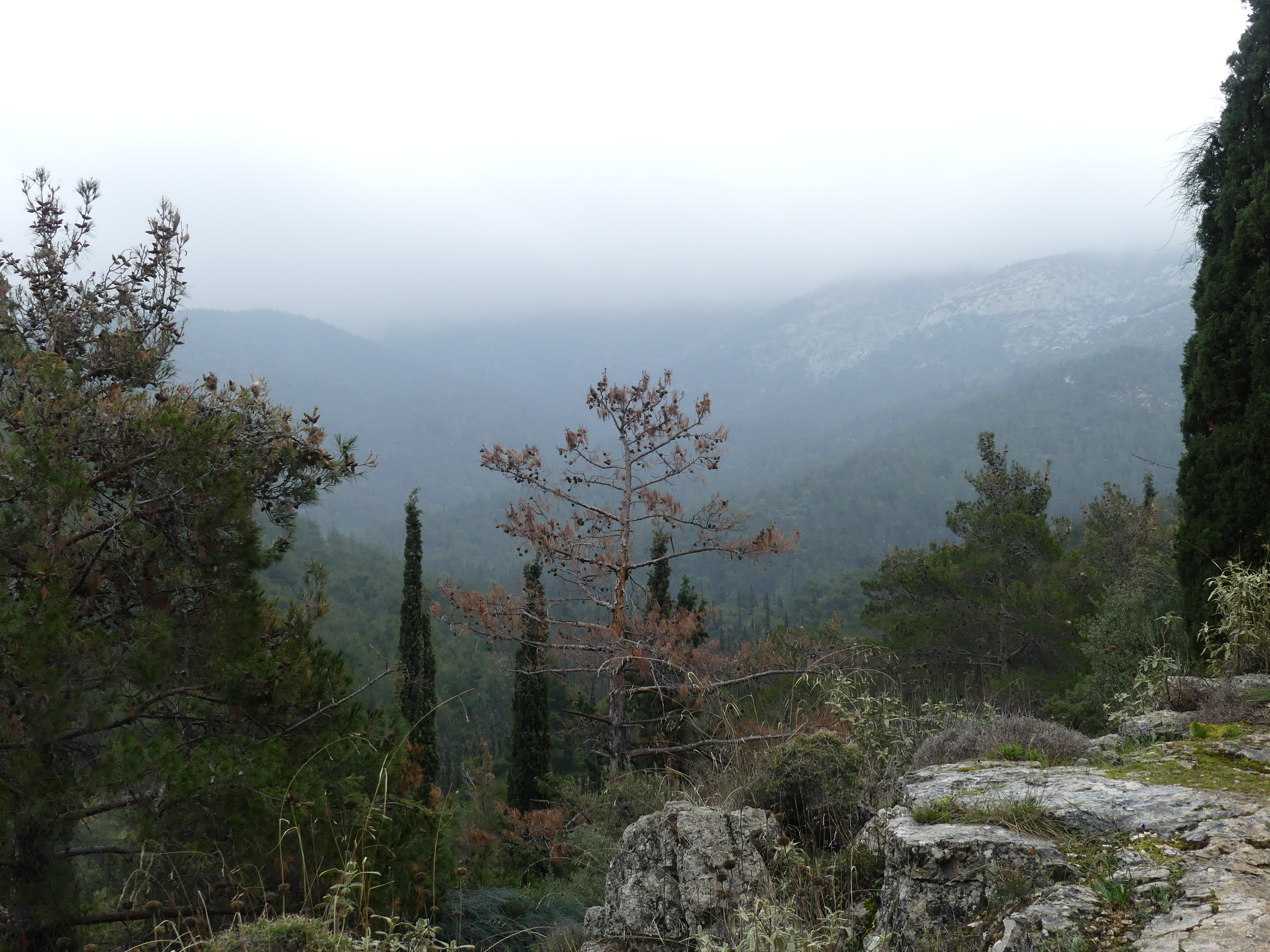
Kaisariani Forest

Kaisariani is located about 3 km (1.9 mi) southeast of the Athens city centre, and 3 km (1.9 mi) east of the Acropolis of Athens. The municipality has an area of 7.841 km^{2}. Towards the east the municipality extends to the forested Hymettus mountain, where the 11th century Kaisariani Monastery is situated. The built-up area of Kaisariani is continuous with that of the center of Athens and the suburb Vyronas to the southwest. The main thoroughfare is Ethnikis Antistasis Avenue, which connects Kaisariani with the center of Athens and the A62 Hymettus Ring Road (formerly the A64 until 2024).

== History ==
=== Byzantine times ===
The Kaisariani Monastery was established on Mount Hymettus during the Byzantine times, in the late 11th or early 12th century.

=== Asia Minor refugees ===
The town was founded in 1922 after the Population exchange between Greece and Turkey, as a refugee camp for refugees driven from Asia Minor, most of whom were coming from Smyrna. Formerly part of the municipality of Athens, Kaisariani was created as a separate municipality in 1933. The name was derived from Caesarea, the historical capital city of Cappadocia in Asia Minor (now Kayseri, Turkey).

=== World War II and the 200 of Kaisariani ===
During World War II, the town became a communist stronghold and earned the nickname "Little Stalingrad".

The Kaisariani rifle range is notable as the site of the execution of 200 communist Greek patriots on 1 May 1944 by the Nazi occupiers as a revenge for the death of German general Franz Krech, who had been killed by ELAS in a guerrilla ambush near Molaoi, Laconia a few days before.

In the early hours of June 17, 1944, 10 men of the EPON and guerillas of the EAM were killed, when trapped by the Nazi forces at the Monastery of Kaisariani, where they had been hiding.

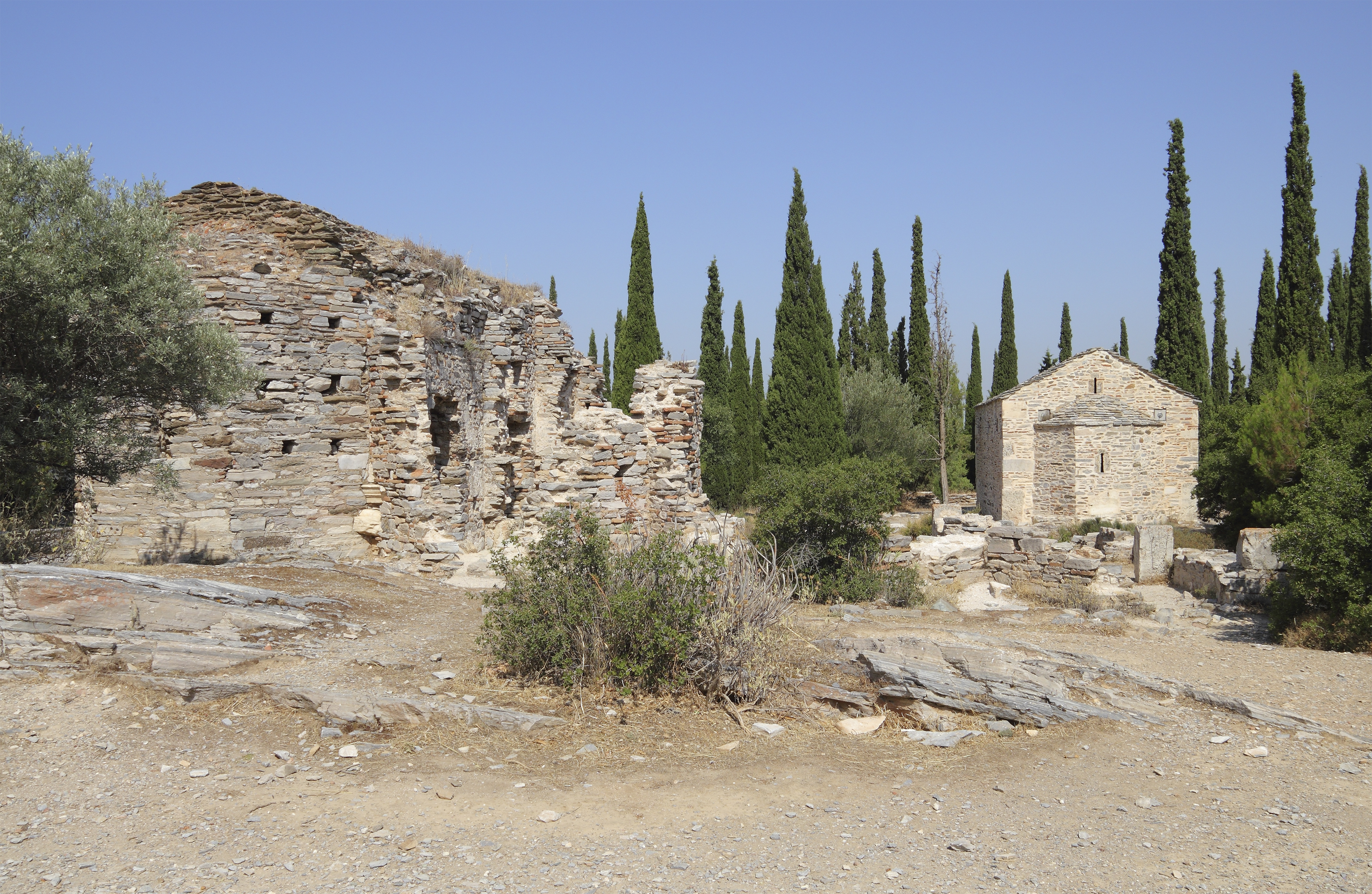
Church ruins on the Kaisariani hill

== Historical population ==
Year	Population
1981	28,972
1991	26,803
2001	26,419
2011	26,458
2021	26,269

== Sports ==
Kaisariani has its own Greek A2 League basketball team, named Near East Kaisariani, which was founded in 1927. The team plays in the Near East Indoor Arena.

Sport clubs based in Kaisariani
Club	Founded	Sports	Achievements
Near East	1927	Basketball	Panhellenic title in basketball, earlier presence in A Ethniki basketball
Ethnikos Asteras F.C.	1927	Football	Earlier presence in A Ethniki

== Election results ==
Election	Turnout	ND	PASOK	SYRIZA	KKE	Other
Jun 2023	55.72	35.90	7.18	21.20	15.26	20.46 (Note: Spartiates 4.54 EL 3.19 PE 3.18 Niki 2.75 Μ25 2.73 Other 4.07)
May 2023	70.63	35.08	6.59	24.08	15.04	19.21 (Note: EL 3.29 PE 3.00 Μ25 2.82 Niki 1.99 ED 1.70 ANTARSYA 1.00 Other 5.41)
2019	58.60	31.48	5.58	36.55	12.16	14.23 (Note: Μ25 4.04 EL 2.55 XA 2.40 PE 1.31 EK 1.15 Other 2.78)
Sep 2015	58.68	21.31	4.51	38.54	11.71	23.93 (Note: XA 6.44 Potami 3.80 EK 3.71 LAE 3.40 ANEL 3.16 ANTARSYA 1.21 Other 2.21)
Jan 2015	66.44	22.81	3.44	38.95	11.80	23.00 (Note: XA 6.07 Potami 5.55 ANEL 3.72 KIDISO 2.01 EK 1.68 Teleia 1.30 Other 2.67)
Jun 2012	63.93	21.21	8.35	34.06	9.51	26.87 (Note: XA 8.62 DIMAR 6.39 ANEL 6.28 LAOS 1.60 DIXA 1.56 Other 2.42)
May 2012	67.23	9.99	9.32	23.69	16.02	40.98 (Note: XA 9.41 ANEL 9.02 DIMAR 5.77 OP 2.77 LAOS 2.70 DIXA 2.44 Drassi 1.64 DISY 1.34 ANTARSYA 1.27 Other 4.62)
2009	67.90	21.41	37.92	9.04	16.97	14.66 (Note: LAOS 9.40 OP 2.79 Other 2.47)
2007	70.53	28.58	32.83	10.32	18.82	9.45 (Note: LAOS 5.81 OP 1.21 Other 2.43)
2004	75.17	33.17	38.33	7.38	14.70	6.42 (Note: LAOS 3.07 DIKKI 2.13 Other 1.22)
2000	78.58	30.32	42.00	7.65 (Note: as Syn)	14.96	5.07 (Note: DIKKI 2.74 Other 2.33)
1996	78.77	26.08	37.27	10.98	15.83	9.84 (Note: DIKKI 5.25 POLAN 1.72 EK 1.17 Other 1.70)
1993	83.06	26.55	47.19	6.99	13.56	5.71 (Note: POLAN 4.48 Other 1.23)
1990	83.39	32.37	37.98	26.68		2.97 (Note: ΟΕ 1.01 Other 1.96)
Nov 1989	83.65	30.40	39.36	28.56		1.68
Jun 1989	82.62	28.00	34.74	34.11		3.15
1985	84.40	24.96	43.92	5.22 (Note: as KKE-Es)	24.85	1.05
1981	83.81	20.82	40.14	6.00	29.62	3.42 (Note: KP 1.22 Other 2.20)
1977	84.47	26.66	22.97	9.51 (Note: as Symmachia)	28.61	12.25 (Note: EDIK 7.55 EP 3.37 Other 1.33)
1974	85.37	33.48	11.06	33.95		21.51 (Note: EK–ND 21.09 Other 0.42)

== Notable people ==
- Themis Adamantidis, singer
- Christos Dantis, singer and songwriter
- Anna Fonsou, actress
- Stelios Giannakopoulos, footballer
- Antonis Kalogiannis, singer
- Evangelos Kouloumbis, politician
- Domna Samiou, musician

== See also ==
- List of municipalities of Attica
