= Georgios Daskalakis =

Greek businessman, trade unionist, and politician (1936–2022)

Georgios Daskalakis MP
- Γεώργιος Δασκαλάκης

Member of the Hellenic Parliament for Athens B
- In office 9 April 2000 – 11 February 2004

Member of the Hellenic Parliament for Arcadia
- In office 7 May 1985 – 24 August 1996

Member of the Hellenic Parliament for Athens A
- In office 18 October 1981 – 7 May 1985

Personal details
- Born: 12 July 1936 Lagadia, Arcadia, Greece
- Died: 16 July 2022 (aged 86) Athens, Greece
- Party: PASOK
- Spouse: Maria Kornaraki
- Children: 2
- Education: ASOEE

Georgios P. Daskalakis (Greek: Γεώργιος Δασκαλάκης; 12 July 1936 – 16 July 2022) was a Greek businessman, trade unionist, and politician who served in the Hellenic Parliament from 1981 until 1996 and from 2000 until 2004. Daskalakis was one of the co-founders of the Panhellenic Socialist Movement.

== Biography ==
Daskalakis was born in the town of Lagadia, Arcadia in the Kingdom of Greece on 12 July 1936. He studied economics at the Supreme School of Economics and Business. During his youth, Daskalakis helped organize the union movement within insurance companies, and he became a political and union activist. Daskalakis was later part of the opposition against the Greek junta. After the fall of the junta in 1974, Daskalakis, a close associate of Andreas Papandreou, co-founded the Panhellenic Socialist Movement (PASOK). In 1975, he also founded PASKE, the trade unionist faction of PASOK. From 1982 until 1985, he was a member of the executive committee of PASOK.

Daskalakis was an executive at a private insurance company until 1981, when he was elected to the Hellenic Parliament as a member of PASOK, representing the Athens A constituency. In 1985, he ran for re-election in the Arcadia constituency, and was re-elected from Arcadia in 1985, June 1989, November 1989, 1990, and 1993. His term in parliament ended in 1996. From 1997 until 2000, Daskalakis served as the chairman of the board of directors at the General Bank of Greece.

In 2000, Daskalakis was elected back to parliament for the Athens B constituency. Daskalakis only served 1 term, leaving parliament in 2004.

While in parliament, Daskalakis held several ministerial positions. From 1987 to 1989, Daskalakis was Deputy Minister of Trade. From 1993 until 1996, he was Deputy Minister of the Interior, Public Administration, and Decentralization; in this role, Daskalakis led decentralization efforts within Greece. In 1996, he was Deputy Minister of Transport and Communications.

In 1994, Daskalakis proposed the law which established 19 May as Pontian Greek Genocide Remembrance Day.

Daskalakis was married to Maria Kornaraki and had 2 daughters. He died on 16 July 2022.
