= Greek legislative election, 1989 =

The term Greek legislative election, 1989 may refer to:

- Greek legislative election, June 1989
- Greek legislative election, November 1989
