= Konstantinos Mitsotakis =

Prime Minister of Greece from 1990 to 1993

- Κωνσταντίνος Μητσοτάκης
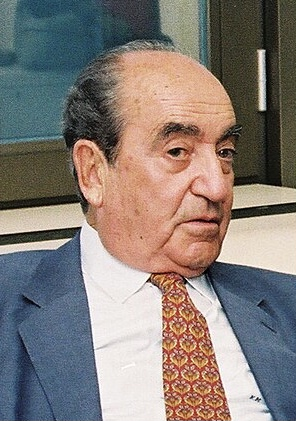
- Mitsotakis in 1993

Prime Minister of Greece
- In office 11 April 1990 – 13 October 1993
- President: Christos Sartzetakis; Konstantinos Karamanlis
- Preceded by: Xenophon Zolotas
- Succeeded by: Andreas Papandreou

Leader of the Opposition
- In office 13 October 1993 – 3 November 1993
- Prime Minister: Andreas Papandreou
- Preceded by: Andreas Papandreou
- Succeeded by: Miltiadis Evert
- In office 1 September 1984 – 2 July 1989
- Prime Minister: Andreas Papandreou
- Preceded by: Evangelos Averoff
- Succeeded by: Andreas Papandreou

President of New Democracy
- In office 1 September 1984 – 3 November 1993
- Preceded by: Evangelos Averoff
- Succeeded by: Miltiadis Evert
Ministerial offices
1992	Foreign Affairs
1991–1993	Aegean
1980–1981	Foreign Affairs
1978–1980	Coordination
1965–1966	Coordination
1965	Finance
1964–1965	Finance
1963	Finance

Member of the Hellenic Parliament
- In office 20 November 1977 – 18 February 2004
- In office 31 March 1946 – 21 April 1967
- Constituency: Chania

Personal details
- Born: 18 October 1918 Halepa, Kingdom of Greece
- Died: 29 May 2017 (aged 98) Anáktora, Athens, Greece
- Party: Liberal (1946–1961); Centre Union (1961–1974); Independent (1974–1977); New Liberal (1977–1978); New Democracy (1978–2017)
- Spouse: Marika Giannoukou (m. 1953; died 2012)
- Children: Dora; Alexandra; Katerina; Kyriakos
- Education: University of Athens
- Awards: Australia Companion of the Order of Australia (Honorary) (6 January 1992); Finland Grand Cross of the Order of the Holy Lamb (10 May 1991) (Portugal) Military Order of Christ (Italy) Order of Merit of the Italian Republic (Cyprus) Order of Makarios III
- Website: K. Mitsotakis Foundation

Military service
- Branch/service: Greek Army

Konstantinos Mitsotakis (Greek: Κωνσταντίνος Μητσοτάκης, romanized: Konstantínos Mitsotákis, IPA: [konsta(n)ˈdinos mit͡soˈtacis]; 18 October 1918 – 29 May 2017) was a Greek liberal politician and statesman. He served as prime minister of Greece from 1990 to 1993.

Born in Halepa, Chania, Crete, the largest Greek island, he came from a politically prominent family related to Prime Minister Eleftherios Venizelos (1910–20; 1928–33). Mitsotakis graduated in law and economics from the University of Athens. An alleged Nazi collaborator during the Axis occupation, he joined politics in 1946 as a member of the Liberal Party. During the 1950s and 1960s, he held several ministerial posts. He joined Center Union party in 1961 and he was regarded as a potential candidate for the party's leadership by 1965. However, he crossed party lines against Prime Minister Georgios Papandreou and his son Andreas Papandreou in the Iouliana of 1965, which made him a controversial figure for decades. After the fall of the Greek junta in 1974, Mitsotakis worked to rebuild his political reputation, and in 1978, joined the political party of Konstantinos Karamanlis, New Democracy. He rose to its leadership in 1984, standing out as one of the few most experienced politicians capable of confronting the populist Prime Minister Andreas Papandreou and the ruling PASOK party. Their rivalry deeply polarized Greek society, cumulating in the "catharsis" era (1989), when Andreas was indicted in connection with the Koskotas scandal after an unlikely coalition between New Democracy and Synaspismos, which included the formerly-banned Communist Party, was formed following the June 1989 elections.

Coming to power in 1990, Mitsotakis implemented an austerity program combined with policies of economic liberalization and privatization in an effort to reverse the economic divergence of the previous decade and steer Greece toward meeting the Euro convergence criteria. His government also improved relations with neighboring countries and the United States, ratifying the Maastricht Treaty. However, his tenure was marred by political instability and internal party conflicts, one which was the handling of the Macedonia naming dispute, that led to the sacking of Foreign Minister Antonis Samaras in 1992. The next year, Samaras lured New Democracy MPs into his own political party, resulting in a loss of majority in Parliament and subsequently defeated in the ensuing elections.

After resigning from the Presidency of New Democracy in November 1993, Mitsotakis remained an influential figure in Greek public life even after leaving office, spanning 58 years of active political career. In 2017, He died at the age of 98. His son, Kyriakos Mitsotakis, was elected as the prime minister of Greece in 2019.

== Personal life and family ==
Konstantinos Mitsotakis was born on 18 October 1918, in the Halepa suburb of Chania, on the island of Crete, into an influential political family, linked to the distinguished statesman Eleftherios Venizelos. His grandfather Kostis Mitsotakis (1845–1898), a lawyer, journalist, and short-time member of parliament (MP) of then Ottoman-ruled Crete, founded the "Party of the Barefeet" (Greek: Κόμμα των Ξυπόλητων) with Venizelos that later became Liberal Party. Kostis married Venizelos' sister, Katigo Venizelou, Konstantine's grandmother. Mitsotakis father Kyriakos Mitsotakis (senior) (1883–1944), also MP for Chania in the Greek Parliament (1915–20) and leader of the Cretan volunteers fighting with the Greek army in the First Balkan War, married Stavroula Ploumidaki. Stavroula was the daughter of Charalambos Ploumidakis (1866–1943), who was cousin of Eleftherios Venizelos and the first Christian mayor of Chania and an MP at the time of the Cretan State.

He studied law at the University of Athens using funds from a bequest established for his education by Eleftherios Venizelos. Mitsotakis was married to Marika Mitsotakis (née Giannoukou) from 1953 until her death on 6 May 2012. They had four children, two of which, Kyriakos Mitsotakis and Dora Bakoyannis, have notable political careers.

Mitsotakis developed a large collection of Minoan and other Cretan antiquities, which he and his wife donated to the Greek state. He promoted the reforestation efforts across Greece, in particular the mountains of Crete.

== Resistance activities ==
Shortly before the outbreak of the World War II, he enlisted in the Infantry Reserve Officers' School on the island of Syros. With the onset of war, he joined the army and fought as a reserve second lieutenant in Macedonia (Greece) against the German invasion of Greece, remaining on the front line for a month and a half. During the retreat, he moved south.

During the German occupation, Mitsotakis joined the resistance and played a key role as a negotiator among its various ideologically divided groups. He was involved in the intelligence network "Pentadyma" (Greek: Πεντάδυμα), linking Allied envoys with anti-Nazi officers. Later on, he intensified his activity by aiming to encourage German soldiers to defect to the Allied side. For his resistance activities, he was imprisoned twice by the Germans.

For his service, he received medals from both Greece and Britain. Following the German surrender, he served as a liaison between the British intelligence service and the Greek military administration.

During the 1980s, it was alleged by some political opponents that Mitsotakis had collaborated with Nazi Germany. There is a photo with Mitsotakis and two Germans standing together, which Mitsotakis variously claimed to either be a fabrication of the Stasi, or that the photo was genuine but the Germans in it had switched sides and joined the resistance forces. Mitsotakis also admitted that during the occupation, he ate two meals a day.

== Political career ==
=== Early political career and Center Union (1946–1967) ===
Mitsotakis was elected to the Greek Parliament for the first time in 1946, standing for the Liberal Party in his native prefecture of Chania. In February 1951, he assumed the position of Deputy Minister of Finance under the government of Sofoklis Venizelos for ten months.

In 1961, he joined into Georgios Papandreou's Center Union, as several members of the Liberal Party did. He took the Ministry of Finance. In the meantime, the son of Georgios Papandreou, Andreas Papandreou, who had joined Greek politics after 23 years in the United States as a prominent academic, was campaigning by having fierce anti-monarchy and anti-American rhetoric, destabilizing the fragile political equilibrium and becoming the leader of the party's left-wing. However, Papandreou's rapid ascension, orchestrated by his father, created displeasure among Center Union party members. After the death of Sofoklis Venizelos, Mitsotakis became the main antagonist of Andreas for the Center Union leadership. In 1965, Mitsotakis, raised nepotism concerns in a newspaper interview, "leadership... is neither bestowed nor is it inherited," marking the beginning of long-term political rivalry between the two men with serious national consequences.

During the Iouliana crisis of 1965, Mitsotakis was among 45 MPs who crossed party lines by siding with the king, further intensifying the growing political polarization. Papandreou loyalists branded this group the "apostates," a label that captured the deep divisions of the period. Although Mitsotakis's political career survived the aftermath of the crisis, he carried the stigma for decades, as opponents repeatedly invoked it to question his credibility and integrity. In the mid-1980s, Andreas revived this memory during election campaigns, portraying Mitsotakis as a traitor and blaming him for Iouliana that led to the Greek junta.

=== Exile (1967–1974) ===
He was arrested in 1967 by the military junta but managed to escape to Turkey with a help of Turkish foreign minister İhsan Sabri Çağlayangil. He lived in exile with his family in Paris, France, until his return to Greece in 1974, following the restoration of democracy.

=== Return to Greece (1974–1984) ===
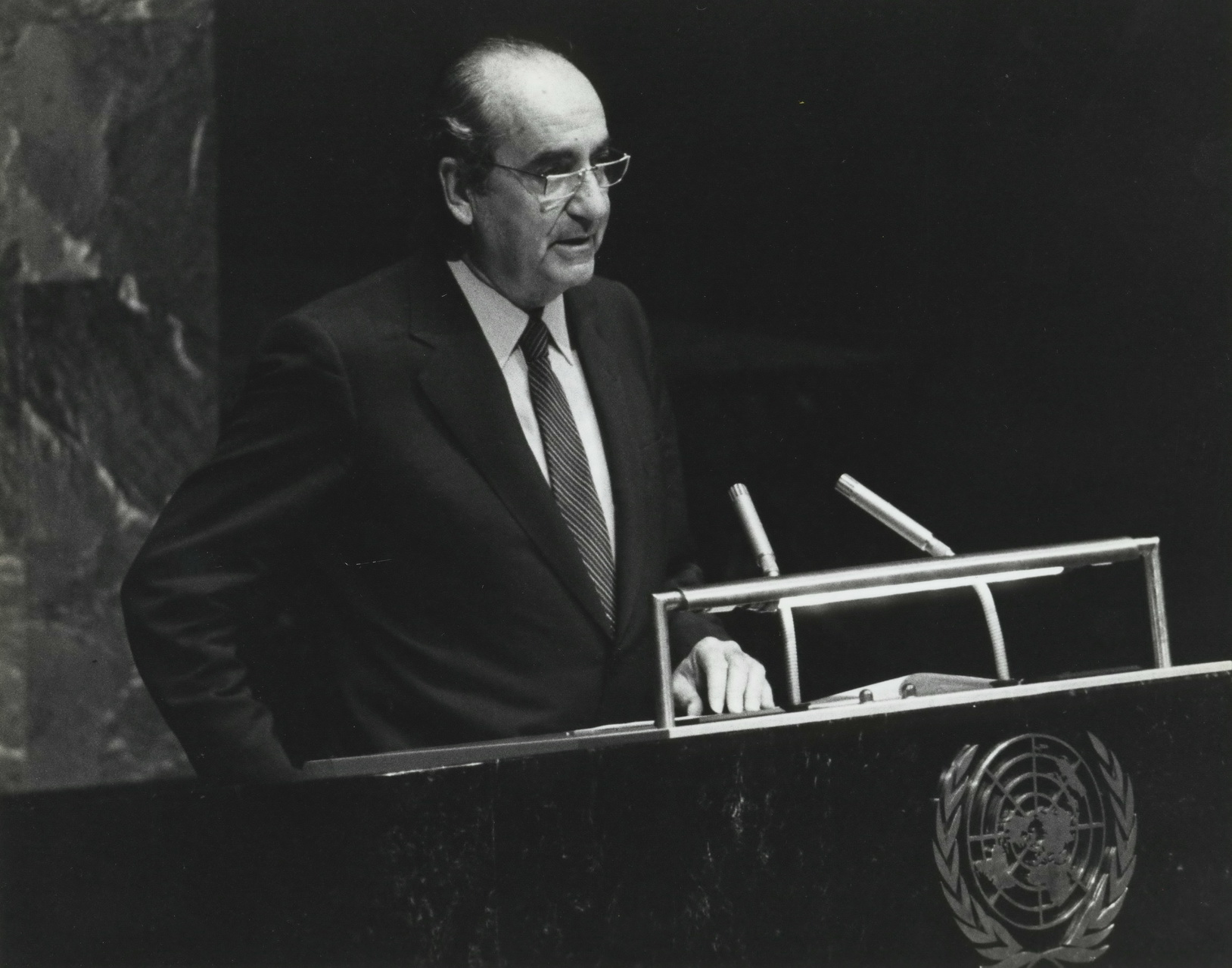
Konstantinos Mitsotakis addressed in the United Nations 35th session in 28/9/1980 as the Foreign Minister of Greece

In 1974, he campaigned as an independent and failed to be elected to Parliament. He was re-elected in 1977 as founder and leader of Party of New Liberals. While his party got 1% of the national vote, its votes were concentrated at Chania, an area with strong Venizelist support, earning two seats. In 1978, he merged his party with Konstantinos Karamanlis' New Democracy (ND) as part of Karamanlis' effort to broaden the ND's appeal toward the political centre. He served as Minister for Coordination from 1978 to 1980, and as Minister for Foreign Affairs from 1980 to 1981.

Karamanlis became President of Greece in 1980, leaving a power vacuum in the upcoming elections of 1981. Georgios Rallis succeeded him as leader, but failed to counter the rising popularity of charismatic Papandreou. The ND government was defeated by Papandreou's PASOK in 1981. On the same day, ND was also defeated in the first Greek election to the European Parliament. These setbacks led the party to elect Evangelos Averoff, former Minister for National Defence, as the new leader of ND.

Papandreou's PASOK started to implemented an ambitious social, economic, and foreign agenda, whose early successes raised concern within ND. In 1984 European Parliament election, ND increased its share of the vote by 7% but still unable to displace PASOK into second place. The defeat prompted Averoff to resign as party leader.

=== Leading New Democracy party (1984–1989) ===
In September 1984, following the resignation of New Democracy leader Evangelos Averoff, Mitsotakis was elected as the party's new leader. He launched a series of structural reforms aimed at modernizing the party. However, before these changes could take effect, Mitsotakis, as leader of the opposition, found himself confronting Papandreou in the first constitutional crisis of the republic.

==== Constitutional crisis (1985) ====
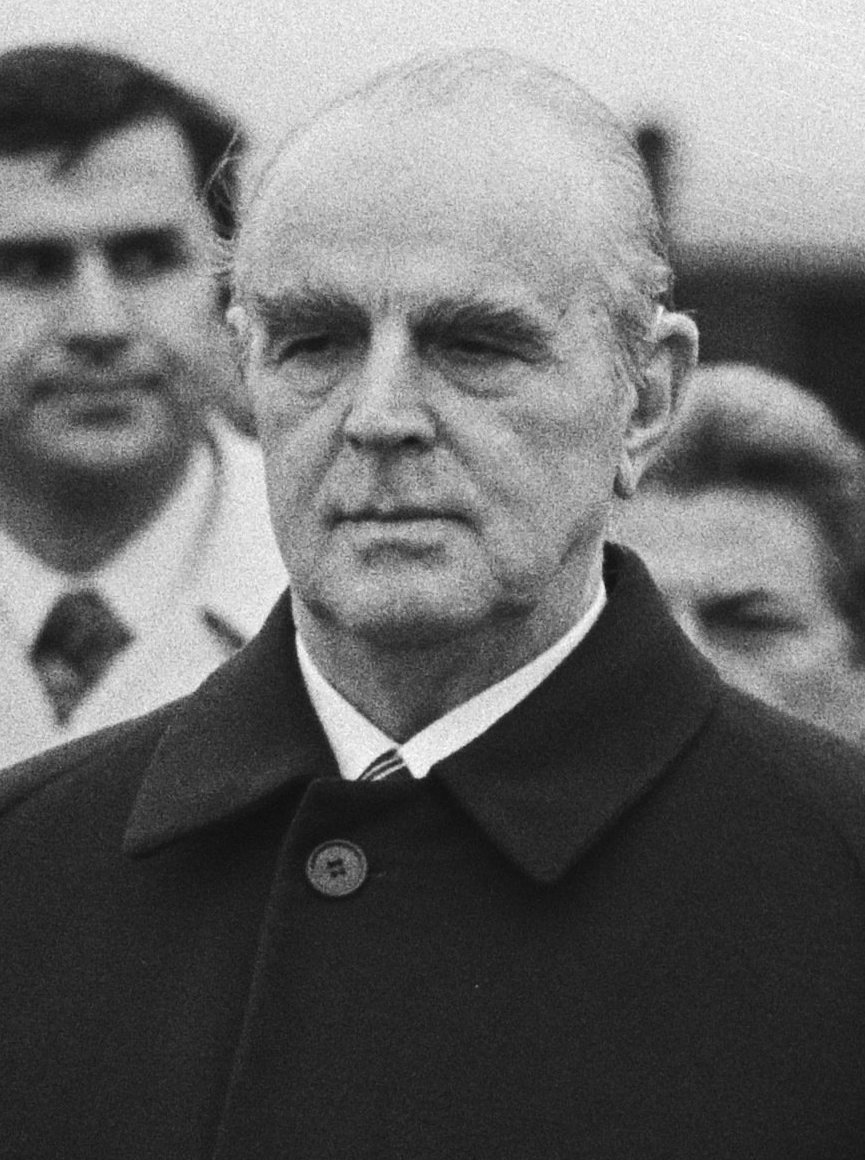
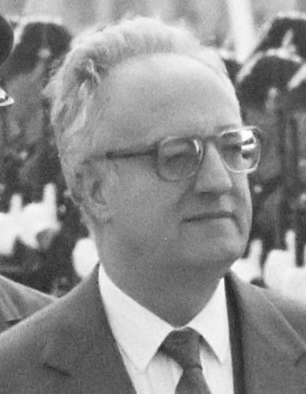
Presidents of the Hellenic Republic, Konstantinos Karamanlis (left) and Christos Sartzetakis (right).

In March 1985, Papandreou provoked a constitutional crisis by denying Karamanlis a second presidential term and instead supporting Supreme Court justice Christos Sartzetakis. At the same time, he proposed constitutional amendments aimed at increasing the power of his position by weakening the presidential powers, which had served as checks and balances on the executive branch. Karamanlis resigned two weeks before the termination of his term, and acting president Ioannis Alevras of PASOK took over. Mitsotakis was quick to accuse Papandreou of creating a constitutional crisis to remove Karamanlis from office to establish a totalitarian constitution; an observation that was adopted by constitutional scholars in subsequent analysis of the events.

The election of the new president took place under a tense and confrontational atmosphere due to Papandreou's dubious constitutional procedures. Mitsotakis accused Papandreou of violating constitutional principle of secret ballot (Article 32), by forcing his deputies to cast their vote with colored ballots. However, Mitsotakis' concern was dismissed because PASOK controlled the majority in the Parliament. Mitsotakis and Papandreou ended up having a verbal confrontation. Mitsotakis claimed Papandreou had no respect for the Parliament, and Papandreou responded, with Mitsotakis' role in the Iouliana in mind, that the latter was the last person entitled to speak about respect.

Sartzetakis was elected in the third round with Alevras casting the decisive vote. Mitsotakis considered the vote illegal and claimed that if New Democracy won the upcoming elections, Sartzetakis would not be president by bringing the legality of the process to Council of State (Greek: Συμβούλιο Επικρατείας), further deepening the constitutional crisis.

==== Polarized 1985 elections ====
Both parties continued their confrontations over the constitutional crisis in their election campaigns, where the political polarization reached new heights. On one hand, Mitsotakis declared, "In voting, the Greek people will also be voting for a president" and warned the danger of sliding towards an authoritarian one-party state. One the other hand, Papandreou characterized the upcoming elections as a fight between light and darkness in his rallies, implying that PASOK represented the "forces of light" since its logo was a rising sun. He further argued that every vote against PASOK was a vote for the return of the Right with the slogan "Vote PASOK to prevent a return of the Right." The communists, persecuted by the Right in the 1950s, protested against Papandreou's dwelling on the past, pointing out that the 1980s were not the same as the 1950s. Before the elections, Karamanlis cautioned voters that PASOK had brought "confusion and uncertainty," but his statement was withheld from state-controlled media.

In the election, New Democracy raised its vote share by 4.98%, reaching 40.84%, however, this gain was insufficient, as PASOK’s losses were minimal—only about 2.3% compared to 1981—allowing PASOK to be re-elected with 45.82% of the vote. Historian, Richard Clogg argued that the large-scale rally by Mitsotakis on 2 June at Syntagma Square may have panicked communists to vote for PASOK, effectively erasing any gains by centrists defecting from PASOK.

Mitsotakis accepted Sartzetakis as president after his defeat. Papandreou's constitutional changes were enacted in 1986, consolidating power in the office of the prime minister.

==== Leadership speculations and fracture ====
Despite ND's increased share of the vote, PASOK's 5% lead, combined with concerns over the party’s two consecutive electoral defeats (in 1981 under Georgios Rallis and in 1985 under Mitsotakis), sparked doubts among ND's old guard about Mitsotakis's future as party leader. Facing internal dissent, Mitsotakis resigned in 1985 but later stood unopposed for re-election at the party congress, winning the backing of 82 of ND's 126 deputies, 11 more than in 1984. His former rival for the leadership, Konstantinos Stephanopoulos, abstained from the vote and subsequently left ND to establish a new political party, Democratic Renewal, taking nine MPs with him. Stephanopoulos criticized the ND leadership for its weak campaign performance in 1985 and for appearing to prioritize the interests of employers over those of workers.

==== Unholy alliance ====
The dominance of Papandreou in the elections of 1985 caused frustration in the communist parties, Communist Party of Greece (KKE) and Eurocommunists, who lost significant electoral share. Moreover, there was growing resentment towards PASOK for its authoritarian practices and monopoly of power, while at the same time utilized the Left's ideology and voting power. In the local elections of October 1986, KKE party chose not to support candidates of PASOK in the three major municipalities (Athens, Piraeus, and Thessaloniki), which provided an opportunity for ND to obtain a new power basis to challenge PASOK. PASOK described this unannounced collaboration as "unholy alliance."

=== Catharsis (1989–1990) ===
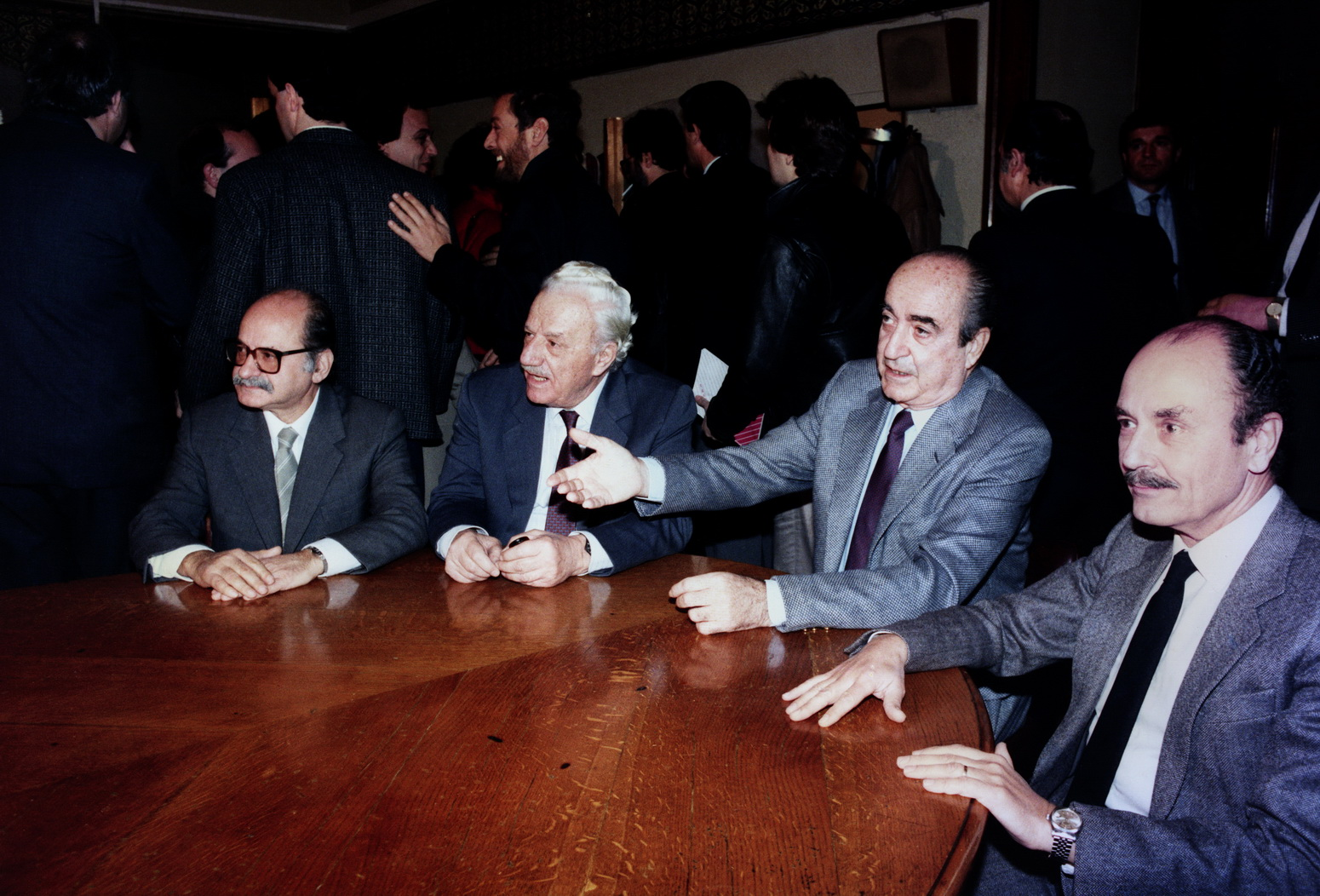
Four Greek politicians (L-R: Leonidas Kyrkos, Charilaos Florakis, Mitsotakis, Konstantinos Stephanopoulos) discuss a time after the Papandreou indictment for the Koskotas scandal. Papandreou called them the "gang of four."

In the June 1989 election, Mitsotakis defeated Papandreou, owing much to the Koskotas scandal. However, no single political party formed a government on its own, a consequence of Papandreou's electoral law change just before the elections that was intended to prevent the opposition from coming to power. The political gridlock led to an unexpected collaboration between conservative New Democracy and leftist parties under Synaspismos, led by Charilaos Florakis, to form a government with a limited mandate to carry out the investigations into PASOK's scandals that became known as "catharsis." This collaboration was extraordinary for Greek society since they were on opposite sides in the Greek Civil War (1946–1949) and signaled the end of military interference in politics. The decision by Mitsotakis and Florakis carried additional responsibility because if charges weren't filed against Papandreou during this term, future prosecutions would be impossible according to the constitution. In 1989, the coalition government between Nea Dimokratia and the Coalition of Left and Progress (Synaspismos), in which the KKE was for a period the major force, suggested a law that was passed unanimously by the Greek Parliament, formally recognizing the 1946–1949 war as a civil war and not merely as a Communist insurgency (Συμμοριτοπόλεμος Symmoritopolemos) (Ν. 1863/89 (ΦΕΚ 204Α΄)). Under the terms of this law, the war of 1946–1949 was recognized as a Greek Civil War between the National Army and the Democratic Army of Greece, for the first time in Greek postwar history. Under the aforementioned law, the term "Communist bandits" (Κομμουνιστοσυμμορίτες Kommounistosymmorites, ΚΣ), wherever it had occurred in Greek law, was replaced by the term "Fighters of the DSE".

The transitional collaborative government was led by Tzannis Tzannetakis (2 July–12 October) and initiated parliamentary investigations that led to the indictment of Papandreou and four of his ministers in connection to the Koskotas scandal (29 September 1989). It also granted the first private television broadcast licenses to publishers critical of PASOK as a counterbalance to state media to avoid future political exploitation from any future omnipotent prime minister. The government was soon dissolved after the indictments.

Political polarization peaked five weeks before the scheduled elections of November 1989, when the Greek parliament was set to begin deliberations on whether Papandreou and four of his ministers should be indicted. On this day, 26 September 1989, just hours before deliberations were to start, Pavlos Bakoyannis (son-in-law of Mitsotakis), a prominent conservative member of parliament and the architect of collaboration between the left and right wings for Papandreou's indictment, was shot by 17 November terrorist group outside his office in Athens. Both major political parties, New Democracy and PASOK, blamed each other for the assassination. On 22 October, there was an assassination attempt against Mitsotakis hours before addressing his supporters in Mytilini on the island of Lesbos.

After the indictments, the collaborative government dissolved on 7 October, and a caretaker government under Ioannis Grivas took over until the elections on 5 November. In the November 1989 elections, New Democracy rose to 46% but still could form a government. A National unity government was then formed by New Democracy, PASOK, and Synaspismos under 85-year-old former banker Xenophon Zolotas to break the deadlock and restore public trust. Zolotas resigned in April 1990, unable to reverse the economic decline attributed to Papandreou's earlier policies. In the April 1990 elections, Mitsotakis was able to form government with the support of a single MP from Democratic Renewal.

=== Prime Minister (1990–1993) ===
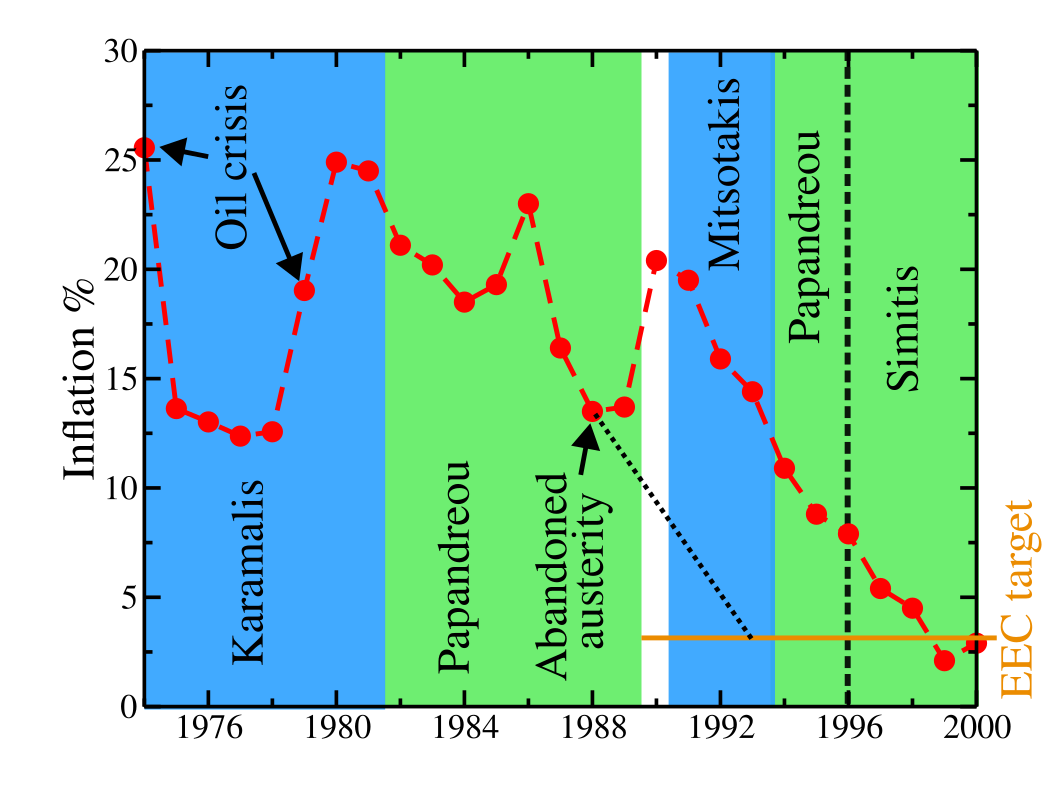
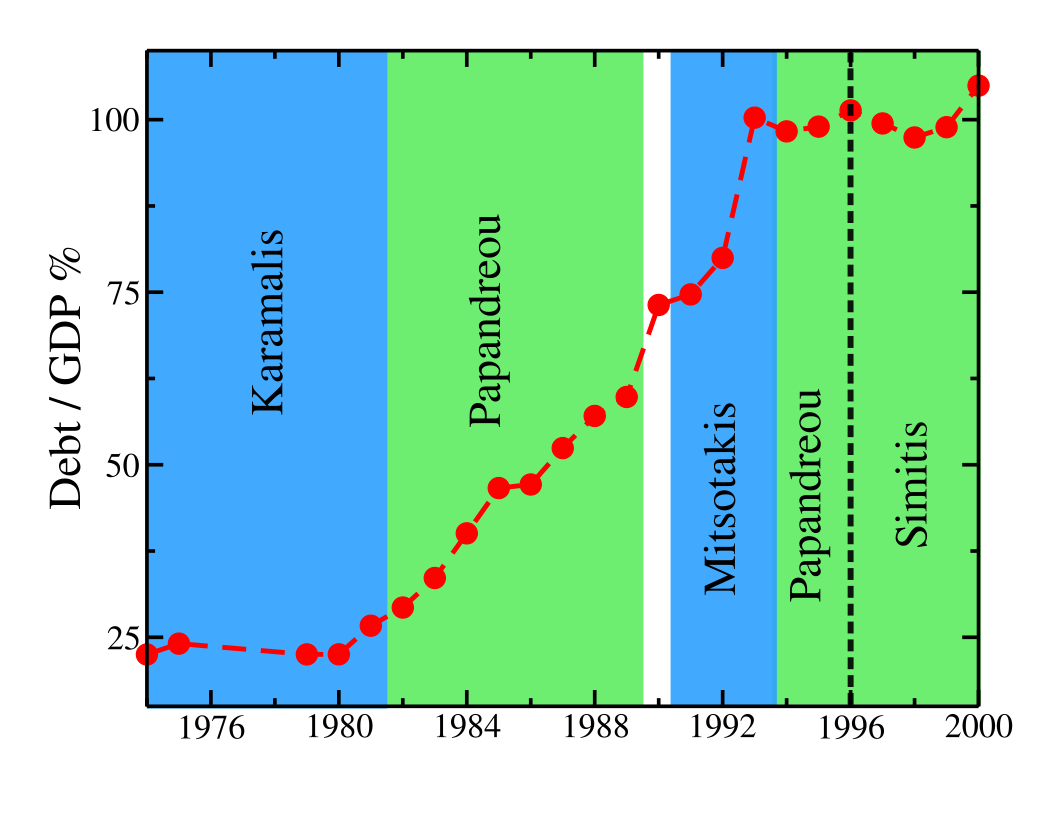
(Left) Greek inflation (%) in 1974–2000 period. In 1987, Papandreou abandoned the austerity measures (the dotted line estimates inflation if he had not) and delayed the convergence of the Greek economy with EEC criteria by more than four years. The 1980–2000 dataset is from the International Monetary Fund website , the 1974–1979 dataset is from the AMECO Database . (Right) Greek debt over GDP (%) in the 1974–2000 period. In 1981, Papandreou changed the course of the economy by making it more dependable on foreign borrowing. The dataset is from the International Monetary Fund website . The colored regions approximately highlight the prime minister's reigns; for 1989–1990, there was no stable government due to Papandreou's change in electoral law.

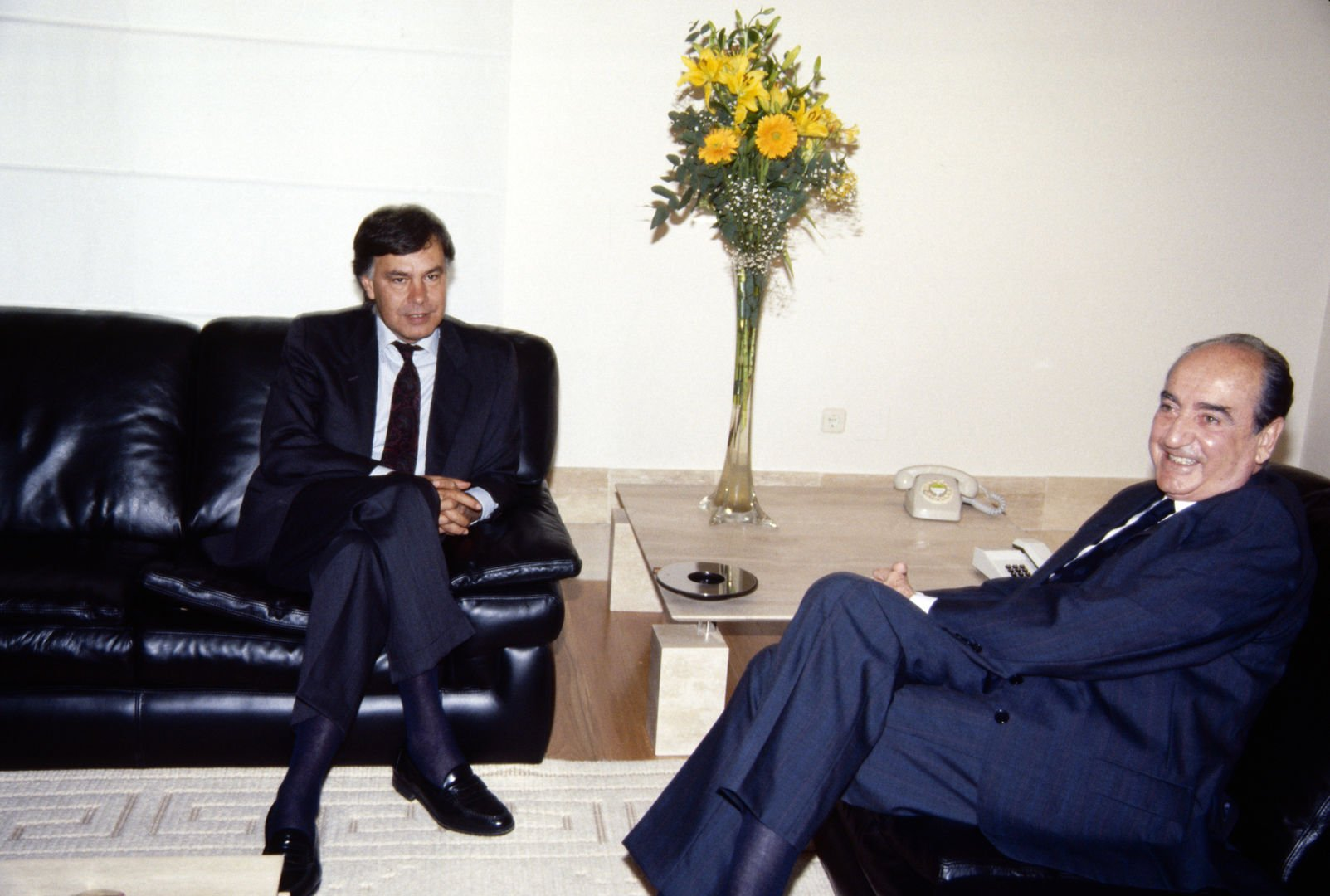
Mitsotakis with Spanish Prime Minister Felipe González in 1990

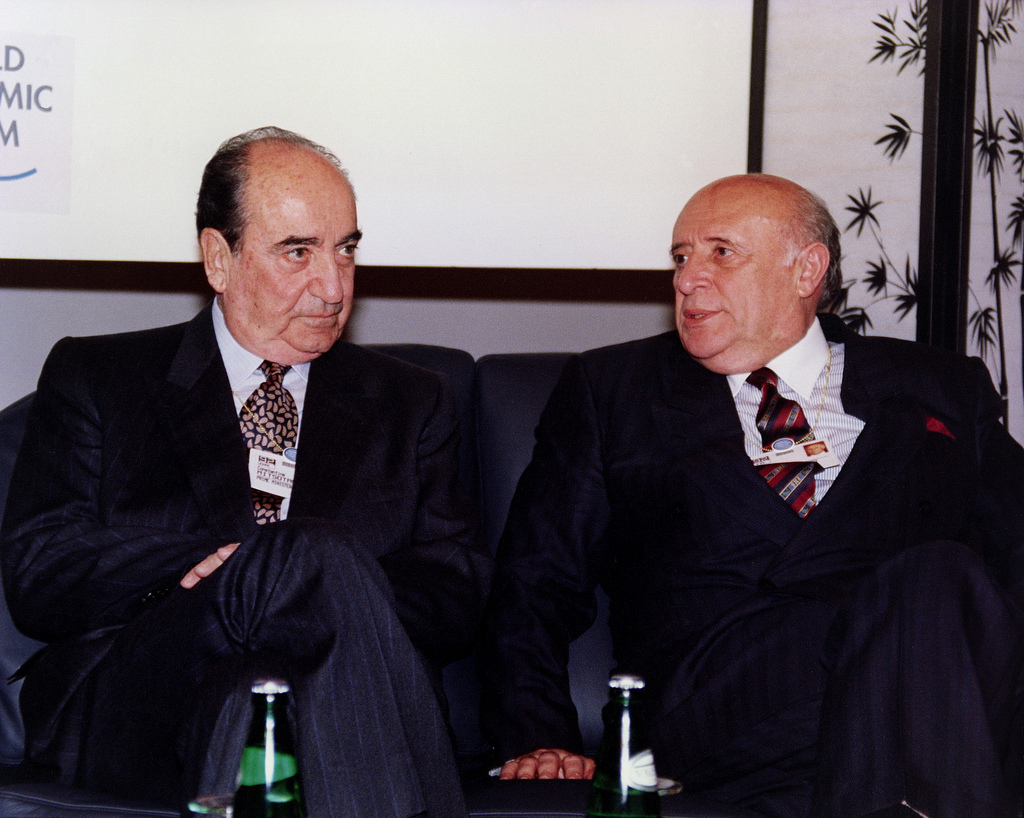
Mitsotakis with Turkish Prime Minister Süleyman Demirel with in the World Economic Forum in Davos, on 1 February 1992.

==== Economy ====
Mitsotakis' government, after taking office, introduced a series of austerity measures (following the footsteps of Costas Simitis in 1985–7) to tame the chronic budget deficits and high inflation rates, both necessary to meet the Euro convergence criteria. His government also repealed the wage price index, which kept people's incomes high while fueling inflation, and it was PASOK's popular law among wage earners since 1982 when it was first introduced. Certain areas, such as banking, were deregulated to attract capital. Mitsotakis' government sold or liquidated 44 companies controlled by the "Industrial Reconstruction Organisation," which was created by PASOK and was designed to assist failed firms in recovery. While the Greek economy started to recover towards meeting the Euro convergence criteria, austerity policies caused significant frustration on the Greek voters. Moreover, Mitsotakis lacked the political capital to impose the necessary fiscal disciple, causing friction with ND populists members, who wished to swell their patronage appointments as Papandreou did.

==== Social reforms ====
In social policy family benefits were introduced for families with 3 children or more. Social Insurance Institute pension replacement rates were reduced from 80% to 60%, while the retirement age was raised to 65 for both men and women who entered the workforce in 1993.

==== Foreign policy ====
Mitsotakis initiated efforts designed to improve relations with the US, which Papandreou's anti-American rhetoric had damaged. In July 1990, a defense cooperation agreement was signed regarding the operation of American bases in Greece for the next eight years. Greece's airspace and naval support during the Gulf War further improved the relations between U.S. and Greece. Mitsotakis also visited Washington, making him the first Greek prime minister to do so since 1964 by Papandreou's father. Mitsotakis took the initiative for Greece to formally recognize the State of Israel, making it the last EEC member to do so. In 1992, he visited Israel, making it the first official visit by a Greek Prime Minister while in office. To prevent the use of Greece as a base for terrorism, Mitsotakis reinstated Karamanlis' anti-terror legistation that Papandreou had repealed in 1983 and expelled PLO members. Mitsotakis also supported a new dialogue with Turkey, but made progress on the Cyprus dispute a prerequisite for improvement on other issues.

==== Opposition and conflicts ====
Papandreou criticized Mitsotakis's government for its economic policies, for not taking a sufficiently strict position over the naming dispute with the newly independent Republic of Macedonia (Mitsotakis favored a composite name such as "Nova Macedonia", for which he was accused at the time of being too lenient) as well as over Cyprus, and for being too pro-American. Mitsotakis's government collapsed after Antonis Samaras left the New Democracy party in June 1993, protesting his dismissal as Minister for Foreign Affairs in April 1992 due to his moderate handling of the Macedonia naming dispute with the neighboring country. Samaras created a new political party Political Spring (Greek: Πολιτική Άνοιξη) that sliced off ND support in the upcoming elections.

=== Post-leadership era (1993–2004) ===
We are battling against the powerful, greedy interests which thought that Greece belonged to them, who were used to running the country from behind the scenes for their own benefit. When we wouldn’t go along with them, they brought down the government, with the hope of bringing back Mr. Papandreou who has always done their bidding. But they will soon learn ... that our country is the precious heritage of all the people, not the private preserve of any individuals, no matter how much money, how many media and how many politicians they own.

— Mitsotakis in his final election rally in 1993

Papandreou's PASOK obtained a parliamentary majority in premature 1993 elections, based on the restored pre-1989 electoral system. After the elections, Mitsotakis resigned as ND leader and he was replaced by Miltiadis Evert, however, he remained the party's honorary chairman.

=== Retirement and death ===
In January 2004 Mitsotakis announced that he would retire from Parliament at the 7 March election, 58 years after his first election.

Mitsotakis died from natural causes, at his office residence in the Anáktora neighbourhood of Athens, on 29 May 2017, at age 98. Four days of national mourning were declared. His state funeral was held on 31 May 2017 and he was buried in Chania.

== Governance approach ==
Mitsotakis was the first prime minister of the Metapolitefsi whose rise to power lacked the near-absolute dominance within party and government that Karamanlis and Papandreou had enjoyed. Although he led New Democracy to three consecutive electoral victories between 1989 and 1990, only the last granted him a narrow majority. Suspicion from both the populist wing and the Karamanlis' loyalists marked him as an outsider within the party establishment and never fully "owned" the party. His often uneasy relationship with Karamanlis, especially over the referral of Papandreou to a special court, persisted even after Mitsotakis nominated him for the presidency in 1990.

Mitsotakis upheld core liberal values throughout his long career. After becoming ND leader in 1984, he embraced the emergence of neoliberalism at international stage, which helped modernize his image despite his age and longstanding presence in politics. Moreover, he blended modernizing methods, such as market research and professional campaign strategies, with the habits of Greece's political traditions. His program of "Liberal New Democracy," aimed to reposition ND as a reformist and forward-looking party and to counter PASOK's statist agenda. However, his brand of Anglo-Saxon–style liberalism found limited resonance in Greek political culture, often clashing with his own allies.

== Notes ==
1. Some derived from photographic coverage of his funeral.
2. Mitsotakis had approximately seven years of ministerial experience under different prime ministers before becoming one. For comparison, Papandreou's ministerial experience was 18 months, when his father was prime minister, from February 1964 to July 1965. Costas Simitis also had approximately seven years of ministerial experience but under a single prime minister. Karamanlis had three years of experience as Minister of Public Works, but more experienced ministers surrounded him once as a prime minister.
3. While Papandreou contended that Karamanlis' removal was necessary for the constitutional revision, Aristovoulos Manesis, a constitutional scholar, argued the reverse: the constitutional revision was a pretext to justify the removal of Karamanlis, which would remind left-leaning voters as the elections were approaching that PASOK remained faithful to its revolutionary left-wing origins. Additionally, scholars consider that the motive behind Papandreou's actions was to divert public attention from economic policies.

== Sources ==
Constitutions of Greece

- "Greek Constitution of 1952". Government Gazette (Greece) ΦΕΚ A 1/1952 (in Greek). National Printing Office.
- "Greek Constitution of 1975". Government Gazette (Greece) ΦΕΚ A 111/1975 (in Greek). National Printing Office.
- "Greek Constitution of 1986". Government Gazette (Greece) ΦΕΚ A 23/1986 (in Greek). National Printing Office.

Books

- Alexiadou, Despina (2016). Ideologues, Partisans and Loyalists Ministers and Policymaking in Parliamentary Cabinets. Oxford: OUP Oxford.
- Bellou, Fotini; Couloumbis, Theodore A.; Kariotis, Theodore C., eds. (2003). Greece in the twentieth century. London & New York: Routledge. ISBN 978-0-203-04589-3.
- Close, David H. (2014). Greece since 1945: Politics, Economy and Society. London & New York: Taylor & Francis. ISBN 978-1-317-88001-1.
- Carabott, Philip; Sfikas, Thanassis D., eds. (2004). The Greek Civil War: essays on a conflict of exceptionalism and silences. Surrey: Ashgate. ISBN 9780754641322.
  - Close, David. "The road to reconciliation". In Carabott & Sfikas (2004), pp. 257–278.
- Clogg, Richard (1987). Parties and elections in Greece: the search for legitimacy. North Carolina: Duke University Press. ISBN 0822307944.
- ——————, ed. (1993). Greece, 1981–89: The Populist Decade. London & New York: Palgrave Macmillan. ISBN 9781349230563.
  - Kapetanyannis, Vasilis. "The Left in the 1980s: Too Little, Too Late". In Clogg (1993), pp. 65–77.
- —————— (2013). A Concise History of Greece. Cambridge: Cambridge University Press. ISBN 978-1-107-65644-4.
- Curtis, Glenn E. (1995). Greece, A Country Study. Maryland: Library of Congress. ISBN 1-4904-3623-5.
- Draenos, Stan (2012). Andreas Papandreou: The Making of a Greek Democrat and Political Maverick. New York: I. B. Tauris. ISBN 978-1-78076-080-3.
- Featherstone, Kevin; Katsoudas, Dimitrios K., eds. (1987). Political change in Greece: Before and after the colonels. London & New York: Taylor & Francis. ISBN 9781000992144.
  - Katsoudas, Dimitrios K. "The Constitutional framework". In Featherstone & Katsoudas (1987), pp. 14–33.
- ——————; Papadimitriou, Dimitris (2015). Prime Ministers in Greece, The Paradox of Power. Oxford: Oxford University Press. ISBN 9780198717171.
- Gallant, Thomas W. (2016). Modern Greece: From the war of independence to the present. London: Bloomsbury Publishing. ISBN 978-1-350-01451-0.
- Jones, Michael J., ed. (2011). Creative Accounting, Fraud and International Accounting Scandals. West Sussex: Wiley. ISBN 9781119978626.
  - Kontos, George; Kambria-Kapardis, Maria; Milonas, Nikolaos. "Creative accounting and fraud in Greece". In Jones (2011), pp. 211–232.
- Koliopoulos, John S.; Veremis, Thanos M. [in Greek] (2009). Modern Greece A History Since 1821. Oxford: Wiley-Blackwell. ISBN 978-1-4443-1483-0.
- Liakos, Antonis [in Greek]; Doumanis, Nicholas (2023). The Edinburgh History of the Greeks, 20th and Early 21st Centuries: Global Perspectives. Edinburgh: Edinburgh University Press. ISBN 978-1-4744-1084-7.
- Manesis, Aristovoulos (1989). Η συνταγματική αναθεώρηση του 1986 [Constitutional resivion of 1986] (in Greek). Athens: Παρατηρητής. ISBN 9789602603543.
- Tziampiris, Aristotle (2014). The emergence of Israeli-Greek cooperation. Cham: Springer. ISBN 9783319126043.
- Panagiotarea, Eleni (2013). Greece in the Euro: Economic Delinquency or System Failure?. ECPR Press. ISBN 978-1-907301-53-7.
- Pirounakis, Nicholas (1997). The Greek Economy Past, Present and Future. London: Palgrave Macmillan. ISBN 978-0-333-65422-4.
- Pridham, Geoffrey, ed. (2012). Securing Democracy. London & New York: Taylor & Francis. ISBN 9781134975419.
  - Featherstone, Kevin. "Political parties and democratic consolidation in Greece". In Pridham (2012), pp. 179–202.
- Sassoon, Donald, ed. (1997). Looking left: European socialism after the Cold War. London: I.B. Taurus. ISBN 1-86064-179-2.

Journal

- Borgeas, Andreas (2016). "The Evolution of Greece's Security Legislation and Policy". Journal of International and Comparative Law. 3 (2): 161–208.
- Clive, Nigel (1985). "The 1985 Greek Election and its Background". Government and Opposition. 20 (4): 488–503. doi:10.1111/j.1477-7053.1985.tb01100.x. JSTOR 44483257.
- —————— (1990). "The Dilemmas of Democracy in Greece". Government and Opposition. 25 (1): 115–122. doi:10.1111/j.1477-7053.1990.tb00750.x. JSTOR 44482490.
- Clogg, Richard (1985). "The 1985 Constitutional Crisis in Greece". The Journal of Modern Hellenism. 2 (1): 103–112.
- Dobratz, Betty A.; Whitfield, Stefanie (1992). "Does Scandal Influence Voters' Party Preference? The Case of Greece during the Papandreou Era". European Sociological Review. 8 (2): 167–180. doi:10.1093/oxfordjournals.esr.a036630. JSTOR 522295.
- Featherstone, Kevin (1990b). "The 'party‐state' in Greece and the fall of Papandreou". West European Politics. 13 (1): 101–115. doi:10.1080/01402389008424782.
- Featherstone, Kevin (1994). "The challenge of liberalization: Parties and the state in Greece after the 1993 elections". Democratization. 1 (2): 280–294. doi:10.1080/13510349408403392.
- Kalyvas, Stathis N. (1997). "Polarization in Greek Politics: PASOK's First Four Years, 1981-1985". Journal of the Hellenic Diaspora. 23 (1): 83–104.
- Karyotis, Georgios (September 2007). "Securitization of Greek Terrorism and Arrest of the 'Revolutionary Organization November 17'". Cooperation and Conflict. 42 (3): 271–293. doi:10.1177/0010836707079932. JSTOR 45084485.
- Kassimeris, George (1993). "The Greek state response to terrorism". Terrorism and Political Violence. 5 (4): 288–310. doi:10.1080/09546559308427230.
- Papathanassopoulos, Stylianos (1990). "Broadcasting, politics and the state in Socialist Greece". Media, Culture & Society. 12 (3): 387–397. doi:10.1177/016344390012003007.

Newspapers and magazines

- Anastasios Papapostolou (6 May 2012). "Former First Lady of Greece Marika Mitsotakis Dies at 82". Greek Reporter.
- "Arkkipiispa Johannekselle Kreikan arvokkain kunniamerkki". Helsingin Sanomat (in Finnish). 11 May 1991. p. A 4.
- "Constantine Mitsotakis, Who Forged Greek-EU Ties, Dies at 98". Bloomberg.com. 29 May 2017 – via www.bloomberg.com.
- "Τριήμερο εθνικό πένθος: Τι είναι και τι προβλέπει - Πότε κηρύσσεται" (in Greek). Ethnos. 14 June 2023.
- "Former Greek Prime Minister Constantine Mitsotakis dies aged 98". Reuters. 29 May 2017.
- "Constantine Mitsotakis, Former Prime Minister of Greece, Dies at 98". The New York Times. 29 May 2017.

Web and other sources

- Marlise Simons (27 September 1989). "Greek lawmaker is slain in Athens". The New York Times.
- "Papandreou Trial a Modern Drama". Chicago Tribune. 5 October 1989.
- "Funeral Service for Constantine Mitsotakis at the Metropolitan Cathedral of Athens: (Video & Photo Gallery) - The National Herald". www.thenationalherald.com. Archived from the original on 11 October 2017.
- Makris, A. (31 May 2017). "Thousands Attend Konstantinos Mitsotakis' Funeral Service in Athens". Greek Reporter.
- "Διατελέσαντες Πρωθυπουργοί". 27 December 2016.
- "Companion of the Order of Australia". www.itsanhonour.gov.au.
- "Κηδεία Μητσοτάκη: Αυτά είναι τα παράσημα με τα οποία είχε τιμηθεί". Newsbomb (in Greek). 31 May 2017.
- "Το τελευταίο αντίο στον Κωνσταντίνο Μητσοτάκη". iefimerida (in Greek). 31 May 2017.

Political offices
Preceded by Nikolaos Gazis	Minister of Finance; 1963	Succeeded by Asterios Dais
Preceded by Asterios Dais	Minister of Finance; 1964–1965	Succeeded by Stylianos Allamanis
Preceded by Stylianos Allamanis	Minister of Finance; 1965	Succeeded by George Melas
Preceded by Georgios Mavros	Minister of Coordination; 1965	Succeeded by Dimitrios Papaspirou
Preceded by Dimitrios Papaspirou	Minister of Coordination; 1965–1966	Succeeded by Ioannis Paraskevopoulos
Preceded by George Rallis	Minister of Coordination; 1978–1980	Succeeded by Ioannis Boutos
Preceded by George Rallis	Minister of Foreign Affairs; 1980–1981	Succeeded by Ioannis Charalambopoulos
Preceded by Xenophon Zolotas	Prime Minister of Greece; 1990–1993	Succeeded by Andreas Papandreou
Preceded by George Misailidis	Minister of the Aegean; 1991–1993	Succeeded by Kostas Skandalidis
Preceded by Antonis Samaras	Minister of Foreign Affairs; 1992	Succeeded by Michalis Papakonstantinou
Party political offices
Preceded by Evangelos Averoff	President of New Democracy; 1984–1993	Succeeded by Miltiadis Evert
