= Trust Party =

Trust Party may refer to:

- Trust (British political party)
- Trust (Greek political party)
- Trust (parliamentary group)
