= Daskalakis =

Daskalakis (Greek: Δασκαλάκης) is a Greek surname. Notable people with the surname include:

- Georgios Daskalakis (1936–2022), Greek politician
- Cleon Daskalakis (born 1962), retired professional hockey player
- Demetris Daskalakis (born 1977), Greek football defender
- Constantinos Daskalakis (born 1981), Greek theoretical computer scientist
- Iosif Daskalakis (born 1982), Greek footballer
- Demetre Daskalakis (born 1972/1973), American infectious disease physician and gay health activist

== See also ==
- Gianna Angelopoulos-Daskalaki, Greek businesswoman
- Daskalakis Athletic Center, arena in Philadelphia, Pennsylvania
