= Liberal Party (Greece, modern) =

Liberal Party (Greece)
- Leader: Manolis Kalligiannis
- Founded: 1980 (claimed 1910)
- Dissolved: 2012
- Ideology: Liberalism (Greek); Liberal democracy Venizelism
- European affiliation: Libertas.eu

Website
- http://www.liberalparty.gr/

The Liberal Party (Greek: Κόμμα Φιλελευθέρων) was a Greek liberal political party, founded in 1981, which claimed to be the continuation of the historical Liberal Party, one of Greece's leading parties for most of the early 20th century. The party was founded by Nikitas Venizelos, grandson of the original party's founder and leader, Eleftherios Venizelos.

Since 1999, the party was led by the retired military officer Manolis Kalligiannis (Μανώλης Καλλιγιάννης, sometimes referred to as Emmanuel Kalligiannis). After Kalligiannis attended the Rome convention of the eurosceptic pan-European alliance Libertas.eu in May 2009, the party run under the title "Liberal Party – Libertas.eu" (Greek: Κόμμα Φιλελευθέρων – Libertas.eu) for the 2009 European Parliament elections.

== Electoral results ==
Results, 1989–1990 (year links to election page)
Year	Type of Election	Votes	%	Mandates
1981	Parliament	20,645	0.36	0
1985	Parliament	10,551	0.2	0
June 1989	Parliament	9,001	0.1	0
1989	European Parliament	26,040	0.40	0
November 1989	Parliament	5,125	0.1	0
2000	Parliament	2,091	0.03	0
2004	Parliament	2,658	0.0	0
2007	Parliament	3,092	0.04	0
2009	European Parliament	6,485	0.13	0
May 2012	Parliament	3,618	0.06	0
June 2012	Parliament	623	0.01	0
