= Antonis Kalogiannis =

Greek singer (1933–2021)

- Born: 3 August 1935; Kaisariani, Kingdom of Greece
- Died: 11 February 2021 (aged 85); Athens, Greece
- Occupation: Singer

Antonis Kalogiannis (Greek: Αντώνης Καλογιάννης; 3 August 1935– 11 February 2021) was a Greek singer.

== Biography ==
In 1966, Kalogiannis met with composer Mikis Theodorakis, who helped launch his career. During the Greek junta, he went into exile and recorded protest songs with Maria Farantouri. During the 1980s, he established himself as a love singer.

On 11 February 2021, Antonis Kalogiannis died of a heart attack at the age of 86.

== Discography ==
- Κάτι φταίει
- Τα πρώτα μου τραγούδια
- Ερωτικά
- Συνοικισμός Α (1972)
- Για μια σταγόνα αλάτι (1973)
- Τα λιοτρόπια (1974)
- Τι ώρα νά 'ναι
- Τραγούδια Μ. Θεοδωράκη
- Γράμματα στο Μακρυγιάννη (1979)
- Τα σημερινά (1981)
- Μικραίνει ο κόσμος (1983)
- Μικρά Ερωτικά (1984)
- Και που λες Ευτυχία (1985)
- Επικινδυνα παιχνιδια (1990)
- Σε ανύποπτο χρόνο (1991)
- Αντίθετη Πορεία (1993)
- Ιστορίες αγγέλων (1997)
