= Ecologists of Greece =

Ecologist of Greece Οικολόγοι Ελλάδας
- Leader: Panagiotis Mantzanas
- Founded: 1988
- Headquarters: 57 Panepistimiou Street, Athens
- Ideology: Political ecology Green conservatism
- Political position: Right-wing
- International affiliation: World Ecological Parties

Ecologist of Greece (Greek: Οικολόγοι Ελλάδας) is a Greek political party based in Athens that was founded in 1988. It was led by Konstantinos Papanikolas.

The party publishes the magazine Health and Ecology (Υγεία - Οικολογία) and runs the television station Telelight (Τηλεφώς). It also used to run a radio station in Athens called Health and Ecology Radio (Ράδιο Υγεία - Οικολογία) until 2001, when it was shut down.

In the 1989 European elections, it took 0,42% of the vote. Its share of the vote fell in subsequent elections. In the parliamentary elections of 2000 and 2004, and in the intervening local elections, Ecologists Greece formed an alliance with the Democratic Social Movement (DIKKI), the Agro Party (PAEKE) and others. The alliance won between 1 and 3 percent in these elections.

On 11 September 2009, Georgios Karatzaferis, leader of the far-right nationalist Popular Orthodox Rally (Laos) party announced that Ecologists Greece leader Papanikolas would run on the statewide Laos ticket in the 2009 Greek legislative election.

In the May 2023 election, the Ecologist Greens-Green Unity alliance received only 0.6 per cent of the total, or 35,201 votes.

== Electoral results ==
Year	Type of Election	Votes	%	Mandates
November 1989	Parliament	10,223	0.2	0
1990	Parliament	5,787	0.1	0
1993	Parliament	5,561	0.1	0
1996	Parliament	4,113	0.06	0
2000	Parliament	participated with DIKKI		
2004	Parliament	participated with DIKKI		
2009	European Parliament	33,236	0.65	0
2009	Parliament	participated with LAOS		
