= Fate (political party) =

Greek political party

Fate (Greek: Πεπρωμένο; Turkish: İkbal, also translated Destiny) was a Muslim political party in the Xanthi area of Greece.

== History ==
The party first contested national elections in 1989, but failed to win a seat in the June elections. However, it did win a single seat in the November 1989 elections, retaining it in the April 1990 elections. The 1993 elections saw the party lose its parliamentary representation, and it did not contest any further national elections.
