= Popular Unions of Bipartisan Social Groups =

Popular Unions of Bipartisan Social Groups Λαϊκές Ενώσεις Υπερκομματικών Κοινωνικών Ομάδων
- Abbreviation: LEFKO
- Leader: Konstantinos Dalios
- Founder: Konstantinos Dalios
- Founded: June 1989
- Split from: Union of the Democratic Centre
- Ideology: Greek nationalism Euroscepticism; Populism
- Colours: Blue; Light blue
- Parliament: 0 / 300
- European Parliament: 0 / 21

Website
- www.leuko.gr

Popular Unions of Bipartisan Social Groups (Greek: Λαϊκές Ενώσεις Υπερκομματικών Κοινωνικών Ομάδων (ΛΕΥΚΟ), LEFKO) is a minor Greek political party.

Tha party was established in June 1989 by Konstantinos Dalios (Greek: Κωνσταντίνος Ντάλιος), who was MP candidate with Union of the Democratic Centre in 1981. Dalios is the leader of the party.

== Electoral results and tactics ==
Results, 1989–2015 (year links to election page)
| Year | Type of Election | Votes | % | Mandates |
|---|---|---|---|---|
| November 1989 | Parliament | 4,410 | 0.10 | 0 |
| 1990 | Parliament | 3,758 | 0.10 | 0 |
| 1993 | Parliament | 7,237 | 0.10 | 0 |
| 1994 | European Parliament | 18,648 | 0.29 | 0 |
| 1996 | Parliament | participated within POLAN | - | 0 |
| 2000 | Parliament | participated within PASOK | - | 0 |
| 2004 | Parliament | participated within ND | - | 0 |
| 2007 | Parliament | participated within SYRIZA | - | 0 |
| 2009 | European Parliament | 10,572 | 0.21 | 0 |
| 2009 | Parliament | supported PASOK | - | - |
| May 2012 | Parliament | supported SYRIZA | - | - |
| June 2012 | Parliament | supported SYRIZA | - | - |
| 2014 | European Parliament | 8,892 | 0.16 | 0 |
| January 2015 | Parliament | participated within ANEL | - | - |
