= Democratic Renewal =

Democratic Renewal Δημοκρατική Ανανέωση
- Leader: Konstantinos Stephanopoulos
- Founded: 6 December 1985
- Dissolved: 1996
- Split from: New Democracy
- Merged into: Political Spring
- Ideology: Liberal conservatism
- Political position: Centre-right
- European Parliament group: European Democratic Alliance
- Colours: Blue

Democratic Renewal (DIANA, Greek: Δημοκρατική Ανανέωση (ΔΗ.ΑΝΑ.), Dimokratiki Ananeosi) was a Greek political party founded by Konstantinos Stephanopoulos on September 6, 1985. It continued to exist until June 1994.

Stephanopoulos left the New Democracy (ND) party in August 1985 over a conflict with Konstantinos Mitsotakis together with nine other ND deputies. The party was able to obtain one seat in the 1989 (June) election and one in the 1990 election.

== Electoral results ==
Results, 1993-1999 (year links to election page)
Year	Type of Election	Votes	%	Mandates
1989	European Parliament	89,469	1.36	1
June 1989	Parliament	65,914	1.00	1
1990	Parliament	44,077	0.67	1
1994	European Parliament	182,522	2,79	0
