= Trust (Greek political party) =

Trust (Greek: Εμπιστοσύνη, Turkish: Güven) was a political party in the Rhodope region of Greece representing Muslims.

== History ==
The party first contested national elections in 1989, when it won a single seat in the June elections. In elections in November 1989 and April 1990 the party retained its single seat. The 1993 elections saw the party lose its parliamentary representation, and it did not contest any further national elections.
