= Alternative Ecologists =

Alternative Ecologists Οικολόγοι Εναλλακτικοί
- Founded: 1989; 37 years ago
- Ideology: Green politics Eco-socialism; Anti-capitalism
- Political position: Left-wing
- National affiliation: Front of the Greek Anticapitalist Left

Website
- ecoalter.blogspot.com

The Alternative Ecologists (Greek: Οικολόγοι Εναλλακτικοί), officially the Federation of Ecologists and Alternative Groups, is a federation of several groups created after the good performance of an autonomous electoral platform also called Alternative Ecologists in the 1989 European Parliament elections in Greece. It contested the national elections of November 1989 and 1990, taking one seat in each election.

The groups involved in the federation decided to dissolve it in 1993.

Subsequently, some other individuals attempted to use the same title and took legal action for this purpose. One of these groups now forms part of the Front of the Greek Anticapitalist Left.

== Party's electoral results ==
Results since 1989 (year links to election page)
Year	Type of Election	Votes	%	Mandates
1989	European	72,369	1.12	0
November 1989	Parliament	39,158	0.58	1
1990	Parliament	50,686	0.77	1
