= Synaspismos =

Coalition of the Left, of Movements and Ecology Συνασπισμός της Αριστεράς των Κινημάτων και της Οικολογίας Synaspismós tis Aristerás ton Kinimáton kai tis Oikologías
- Abbreviation: SYN; ΣΥΝ
- Leader: Alexis Tsipras
- Founded: 1989 (as an electoral coalition); 1991 (as a political party)
- Dissolved: 10 July 2013
- Merger of: Greek Left; United Democratic Left; Party of Democratic Socialism; Agrarian Party; United Socialist Party; Socialist Union; Progressive Agrarian Party
- Split from: Communist Party of Greece
- Merged into: Coalition of the Radical Left (SYRIZA)
- Headquarters: 1 Eleftherias Square, 105 53 Athens
- Youth wing: SYN Youth
- Ideology: Democratic socialism Eco-socialism; Eurocommunism; Environmentalism; Feminism; Pacifism
- Political position: Left-wing; Factions: Far-left
- National affiliation: Coalition of the Radical Left
- European affiliation: Party of the European Left, European Anticapitalist Left (observer)
- European Parliament group: European United Left–Nordic Green Left
- Colours: Yellow

Website
- www.syn.gr

The Coalition of the Left, of Movements and Ecology (Greek: Συνασπισμός της Αριστεράς των Κινημάτων και της Οικολογίας, Synaspismós tis Aristerás ton Kinimáton kai tis Oikologías), commonly known as Synaspismos (Greek: Συνασπισμός, Synaspismós, "Coalition") and abbreviated to SYN (ΣΥΝ), was a Greek political party of the radical New Left. It was founded in 1991 and was known as the Coalition of the Left and Progress (Greek: Συνασπισμός της Αριστεράς και της Προόδου, Synaspismós tis Aristerás kai tis Proódou) until 2003. In 2004 SYN was a founding member of the Party of the European Left.

SYN was the largest party of the left-wing coalition formed in 2004 called Coalition of the Radical Left (SYRIZA). SYN was dissolved in 2013.

== History ==
=== Coalition, late 1980s–1991 ===
Logo of the Coalition of the Left and Progress

As its name reveals, Synaspismos emerged initially as an electoral coalition at the late 1980s, with the pro-Soviet Communist Party of Greece (KKE) and the Greek Left, one of the successors of the eurocommunist KKE Interior, as its largest constituents. The Party of Democratic Socialism, a splinter from the Union of the Democratic Centre which occupied a similar position to PASOK, was the largest non-communist member party.

The dissolution of the USSR brought the Left into disunion, and the traditional Stalinist majority within KKE purged all non-hardliners from the party—almost 45% of the Central Committee members, including ex-general secretary Grigoris Farakos, and majorities in many Local Committees (called by the KKE majority as "revisionists" and by the press as the "renewers"). At this time KKE also left the coalition.

=== Party, 1991–2013 ===
After that, the other parties of the coalition and the renewing part of KKE decided to convert the alliance into a political party (1991).

Although the 'experiment' seemed to have great potential, serious ideological conflicts were afflicting the new party. At the legislative elections of 1993, SYN failed by 2,000 votes to pass the limit of 3% and enter the National Parliament. But next year, Synaspismos got its highest national 'score' ever (6.26%) in the 1994 European Parliament elections. Two years later, with 5.12%, got its highest score in 1996 legislative elections.

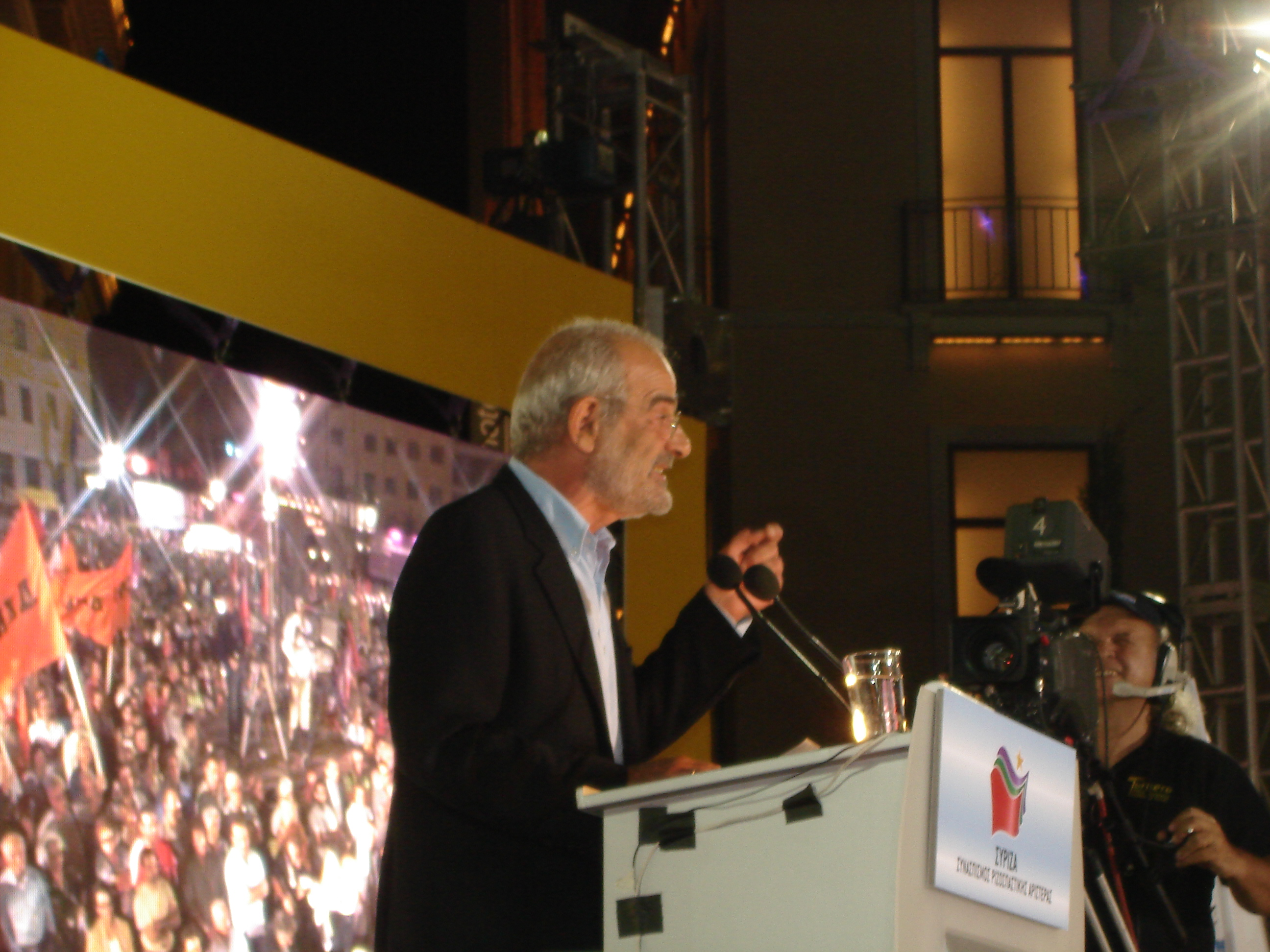
Former Synaspismos leader Alekos Alavanos giving a speech at a SYRIZA rally in Athens

In the legislative elections of 2000, SYN was supported by the small Renewing Communist Ecological Left (AKOA) party and a small group of ecologists. After the elections a few members of the National Committee, who were asking for approximation with the social democrats, left the party accusing the majority of neo-communist turn and created the short-lived party AEKA. AEKA was first split and little later disbanded in some months, when the head of the party became an Undersecretary in the social democratic administration of Kostas Simitis.

In the legislative elections of 2004, Synaspismos, together with several smaller parties (AKOA, Movement for the Unity of Action of the Left – KEDA, Internationalist Workers Left – DEA, Active Citizens), formed an alliance called Coalition of the Radical Left (SYRIZA), but contested the Euro-elections of the same year on its own, because of ideological disagreements within the party. The alliance with the smaller parties was formed again at the end of 2005, when chairman Alekos Alavanos proposed the 30-year-old Alexis Tsipras as candidate mayor of Athens for the Municipal Election of 2006, proclaiming the party's "overture to a younger generation". The Tsipras candidacy was received well, especially so by younger voters, and formed the party's springboard for its good 2007 parliamentary elections showing.

On 10 February 2008 Alexis Tsipras was elected party president, replacing Alavanos, who stepped down citing private reasons. At that time Tsipras did not hold a parliamentary seat, so Alavanos remained leader of the parliamentary group. After the legislative elections in 2009, Tsipras entered Parliament and became leader of the SYRIZA parliamentary group.

The 6th Congress of Synaspismos took place in June 2010. The "renewing wing" led by Fotis Kouvelis, in disagreement with the party's participation in SYRIZA, left the party and founding Democratic Left. Fotis Kouvelis was followed by three more MPs, that left the party caucus.

Both in the May 2012 Greek legislative election and in the June 2012 Greek legislative election, SYRIZA came second, electing 52 and 71 MPs, accordingly, of which 45 and 55 were part of Synaspismos.

In July 2013, right before the first Congress of SYRIZA, the final congress of Synaspismos took place, that overwhelmingly voted to disestablish Synaspismos and to merge with SYRIZA.

== Election results ==
=== Hellenic Parliament ===
Election	Hellenic Parliament					Rank	Government	Leader
Election	Votes	%	±pp	Seats won	+/−	Rank	Government	Leader
As an electoral coalition
1989 I	855,944	13.13%	New	28 / 300	New	3rd	Coalition cabinet of Tzannis Tzannetakis	Charilaos Florakis
1989 II	734,552	10.97%	▼2.16	21 / 300	▼7	3rd	Zolotas Ecumenical Government	Charilaos Florakis
1990	677,059	10.28%	▼0.69	19 / 300	▼2	3rd	Opposition	Charilaos Florakis
As a party
1993	202,887	2.9%	New	0 / 300	±0	No. 5	No seats	Maria Damanaki
1996	347,236	5.1%	▲2.2	10 / 300	▲10	No. 4	Opposition	Nikos Konstantopoulos
2000	219,880	3.2%	▼1.9	6 / 300	▼4	No. 4	Opposition	Nikos Konstantopoulos

=== European Parliament ===
European Parliament
Election	Votes	%	±pp	Seats won	+/−	Rank	Leader
1994	408,072	6.2%	New	2 / 25	▲2	No. 5	Nikos Konstantopoulos
1999	331,928	5.2%	▼1.0	2 / 25	±0	No. 5	Nikos Konstantopoulos
2004	254,447	4.2%	▼1.0	1 / 24	▼1	No. 4	Nikos Konstantopoulos

== Ideological identity ==
SYN described itself as "a radical left party, inspired by the ideas of the renewal of the communist and broader left movement in Greece and in Europe. It also fights for the merging of the ecological movement along with the left, to form a strategic alliance. The party's culture has been enriched by its active participation in the movement against the Neoliberal Capitalist Globalization."

Synaspismos aspired to be a "canopy party"; where, under the party flag, one could find people of varying ideological and theoretical backgrounds. Therefore, SYN members were encouraged to form, or participate in, intra-party platforms on the basis of kinship in ideology. Platforms mounted open discussions and published magazines, but might not work against party consensus decisions.

Note: the exact word used is "τάσεις" ("tendencies"), but the term platform is more fitting in English.

== Tendencies ==
The role of the platforms was vital especially in congresses, because each of them proposed a thesis on party strategy and presented its own ballot of candidates for the National Committee. In the National Committee elected by the last Congress (5 February 2008), the rank (in terms of representation) was the following: "Left Current" (mainstream western Marxism, party center-left), "Renewing Wing" (radical social democracy, party right), the "Red-green Network" (eco-Marxism, party left) and the "Initiative" (eurosceptic Marxism, party extreme left). Since 2004 the Left Stream, the Red-greens and the Initiative formed the so-called Left Majority, which was responsible for moving the party to more radical leftist positions.

- Left Unity (democratic socialist, supporting Alexis Tsipras), 50.63% in the last congress
- Left Current (communist, eurosceptic), 29.83% in the last congress
- Renewing Wing (democratic socialist; most of its members left Synaspismos and founded Democratic Left), 17.23% in the last congress
- Red-Green Network (eco-socialist, communist), participated with the Left Unity list in the last congress
- Initiative for the Left Recomposition (communist, eurosceptic), 1.16% in the last congress

== Representation and international alliances ==
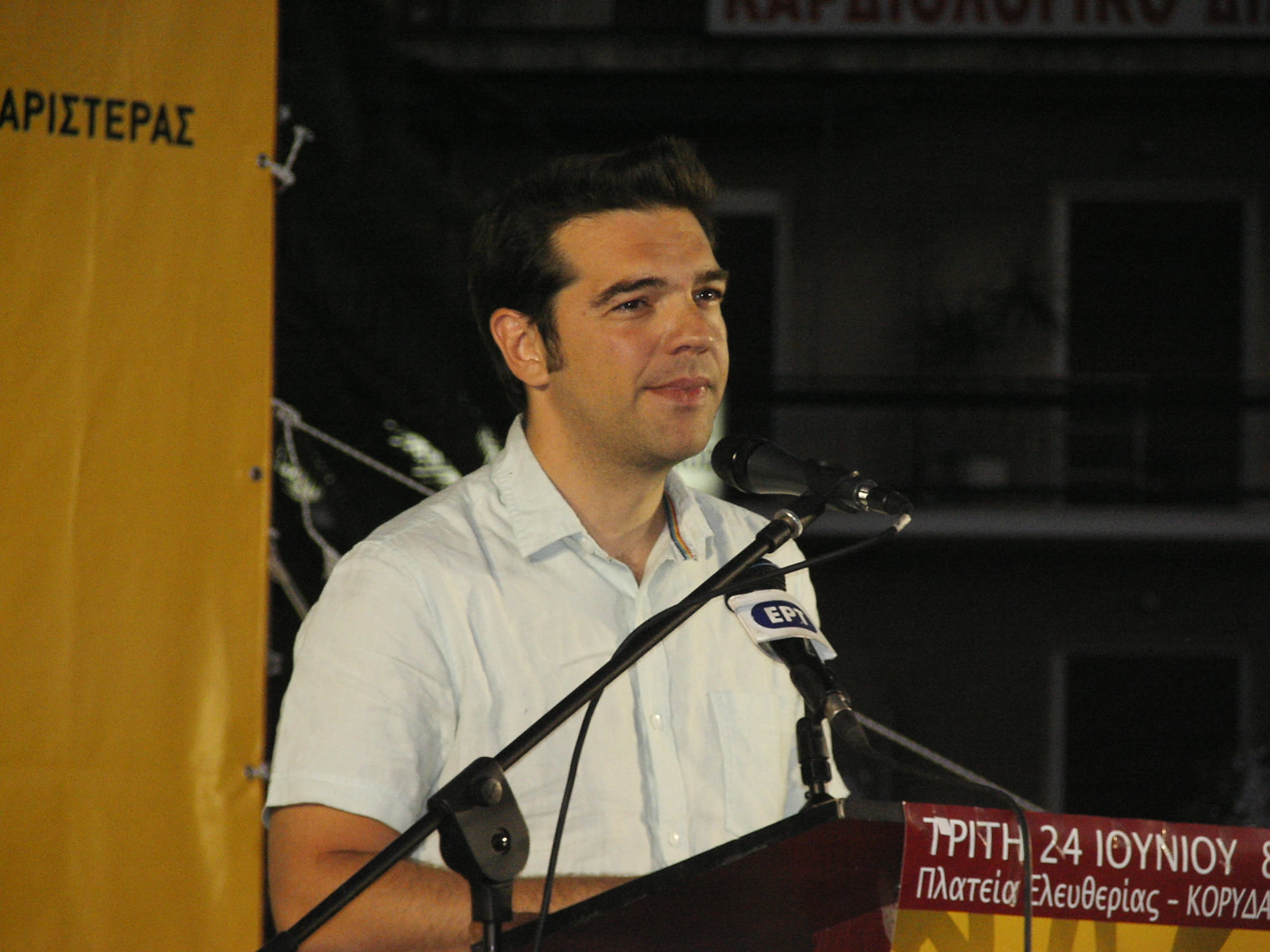
Last chairman Alexis Tsipras

The party had members in the National and European Parliament. After having survived the crisis of not achieving parliamentary representation in 1993, Synaspismos had, since 1996, been the fourth party in the Greek Parliament, and the third party (in terms of representation) in local government. In the European Parliament SYN was a member of the European United Left - Nordic Green Left group, and also a member of the European Social Forum. Moreover, SYN hosted the 1st Congress of European Left (29–30 October 2005), which formulated the Athens Declaration of the European Left as the manifesto of the European Left party.

Well-known executive members of Synaspismos were: Alexis Tsipras, Alekos Alavanos, Giannis Dragasakis, Nikos Konstantopoulos, Panagiotis Lafazanis et al.

Synaspismos was closely connected with the following:

- The Athens daily newspaper ΑΥΓΗ (Dawn)
- The Athens radio station "105.5 FM – Στο Κóκκινο" (In Red).
- The "Nicos Poulantzas" Institute for Political Research
- The Archive of Modern Social History (ΑΣΚΙ)

== Structure ==
The structure of SYN consists of three levels:

- Local: City, village or trade union committees, responsible for everyday matters at the workplace and neighborhood level, and deciding on issues of local interest.
- Prefectural: The Prefectural Administration is elected by the members of the local committees and co-ordinates local committee work.
- Nationwide: The National Committee (Central Political Committee (CPC)) is elected by the Party Congress, held every three years. It exercises the central administration of the party and convenes almost every month. Major decisions are usually taken at this level.
  - The Secretariat is elected by the CPC among its members, and oversees three duties: to represent the party in media outlets and in negotiations with other parties; to prepare CPC sessions; and to co-ordinate party work at the nationwide level. Though somewhat similar to the Politbüro of old-style communist parties, its role is not nearly as dominant. Usually the members of the Secretariat are working full-time for the party.
    - The Chairperson of SYN is elected by the Congress and was a primus inter pares member of both the CPC and the Secretariat.

== SYN youth ==
SYN Youth Logo

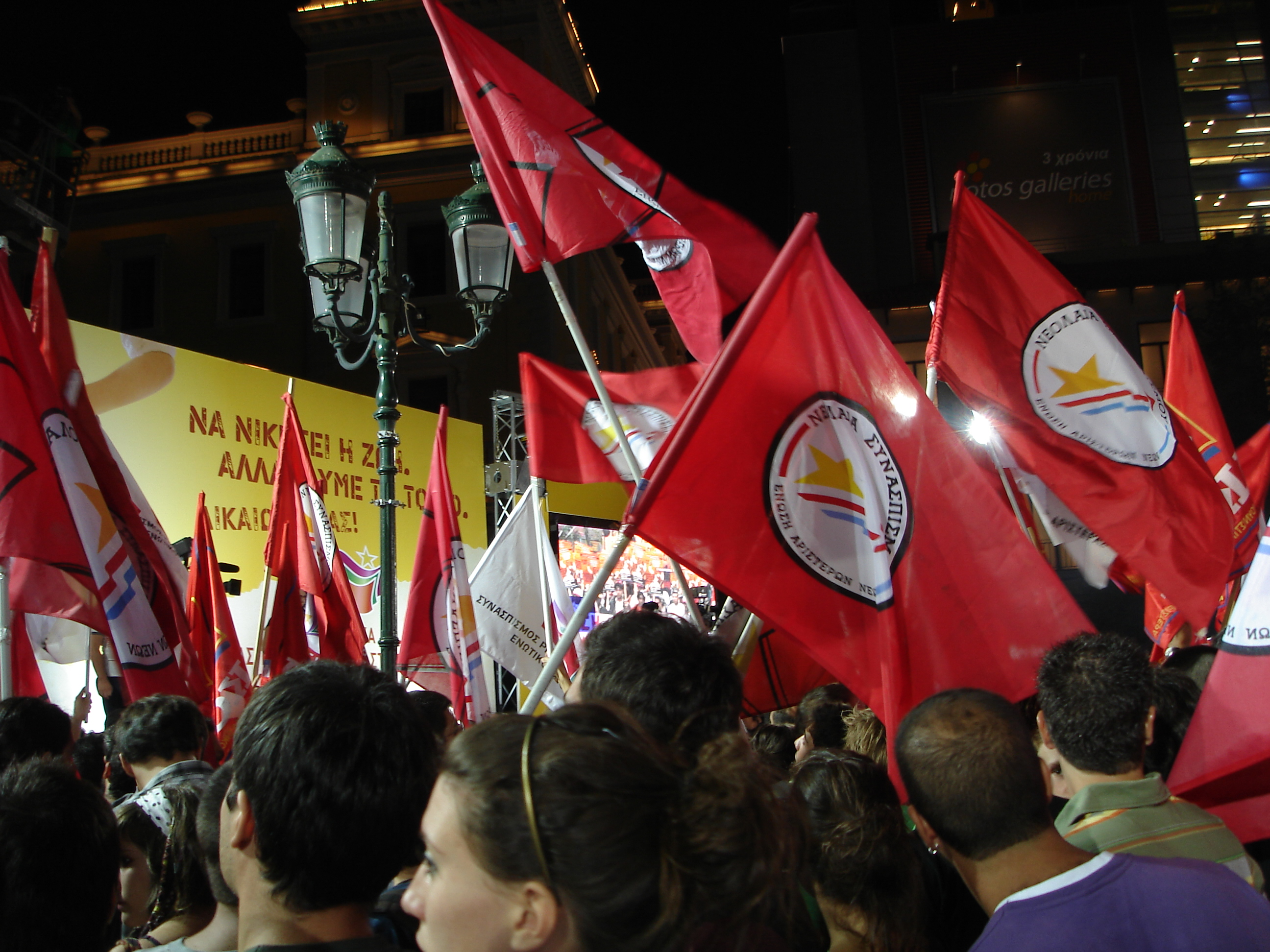
SYN Youth members in a 2007 Coalition of the Radical Left rally

SYN's youth organisation was SYN Youth (Νεολαία ΣΥΝ, SYN Youth), which was autonomous from the party structure. Until the late 1990s they were called "Left Youth League" (Ένωση Αριστερών Νέων). N-SYN had their own membership and executive bodies, but in general their decisions and activity were similar to the ones of the party. Their power was noteworthy in most Student Councils all around Greece, through the AR.EN.(Αριστερή Ενότητα, "Left Unity"). N-SYN also participated in the European Network of Democratic Young Left (ENDYL).

== Leaders ==
No.	Leader	Portrait	Term of office	
1	Charilaos Florakis		8 April 1989	18 March 1991
2	Maria Damanaki		18 March 1991	19 December 1993
3	Nikos Konstantopoulos		19 December 1993	12 December 2004
4	Alekos Alavanos		12 December 2004	11 February 2008
5	Alexis Tsipras		11 February 2008	10 July 2013
