= 1990 Greek parliamentary election =

- 8 April 1990

All 300 seats in the Hellenic Parliament 151 seats needed for a majority
- Registered: 8,453,695
- Turnout: 79.24% (▼1.46pp)
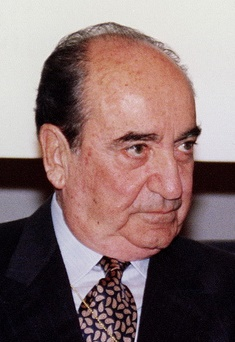

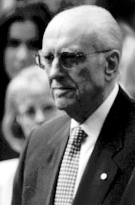

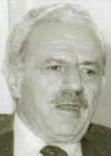
	First party	Second party	Third party
Leader	Konstantinos Mitsotakis	Andreas Papandreou	Charilaos Florakis
Party	ND	PASOK	Synaspismos
Last election	46.19%, 148 seats	40.68%, 128 seats	10.97%, 21 seats
Seats won	150	123	19
Seat change	▲2	▼5	▼2
Popular vote	3,088,137	2,543,042	677,059
Percentage	46.89%	38.61%	10.28%
Swing	▲0.70pp	▼2.07pp	▼0.69pp
- Results by constituency
Prime Minister before election
Xenophon Zolotas
Independent
Prime Minister after election
Konstantinos Mitsotakis
ND

Early parliamentary elections were held in Greece on 8 April 1990. The conservative New Democracy party of Konstantinos Mitsotakis, was elected, defeating PASOK of Andreas Papandreou. In order to be able to command a majority of 151 in the 300-seat Parliament, New Democracy had to secure the support of Theodoros Katsikis, Democratic Renewal's sole MP. Shortly after Mitsotakis was given a confidence vote, the Supreme Special Court, after a mistake in seat calculation was detected, gave a 152nd seat to the coalition of New Democracy and Democratic Renewal.

== Results ==
Party	Votes	%	Seats	+/–
New Democracy	3,088,137	46.89	150	+2
Panhellenic Socialist Movement	2,543,042	38.61	123	–5
Coalition of the Left and Progress	677,059	10.28	19	–2
Alternative Ecologists	50,868	0.77	1	0
Democratic Renewal	44,077	0.67	1	New
Trust	29,547	0.45	1	0
Independent Coalition in the Department of Samos "Cooperation"	17,098	0.26	1	New
Fate	16,434	0.25	1	0
New Left Current–Popular Opposition	14,365	0.22	0	New
Kefalonia and Ithaki Democratic Cooperation for Social Progress and Economic Development	13,700	0.21	1	New
Zakynthos Initiative for the Progress-Development Simple Proportional Vote	12,961	0.20	1	New
Democratic Initiative for the Progress and Development of Evritania	12,707	0.19	0	New
Independents Coalition in the Department of Lefkas "Democratic Progressive Cooperation"	10,395	0.16	1	New
KKE Interior – Renewing Left	8,827	0.13	0	0
Kollatos–Independent Political Movement–Ecologic–Hellenic	7,694	0.12	0	0
National Party–National Political Union	6,641	0.10	0	New
Ecologists of Greece	5,787	0.09	0	0
Party of Greek Hunters	5,060	0.08	0	New
Popular Unions of Bipartisan Social Groups	3,758	0.06	0	0
Ecologist-Peace Supporters–Greens	3,360	0.05	0	New
Union of Ecologists	3,158	0.05	0	New
Communist Party of Greece (Marxist–Leninist)	2,590	0.04	0	0
Nationalist Coalition	2,079	0.03	0	New
Marxist–Leninist Communist Party of Greece	1,355	0.02	0	0
Revolutionary Communist Movement of Greece	1,350	0.02	0	0
Self-Governed Movement of Labour Politics	1,174	0.02	0	0
Human Rights Party	764	0.01	0	New
Olympic Party	691	0.01	0	0
Hellenic Unity	210	0.00	0	New
Hellenic European Party	74	0.00	0	0
Humanism and Peace Party	71	0.00	0	0
Independents Worker Fighter	51	0.00	0	New
Greens-Ecological Party of Greece-Hellenic Alternative Green Movement	42	0.00	0	0
Centre Democratic Party of Greece	37	0.00	0	New
King Fighter	27	0.00	0	New
Independent Social Democratic Revival	15	0.00	0	0
Regional Urban Development	12	0.00	0	0
Independent Movement of Democratic Revival	8	0.00	0	New
Flag of Hellenic Democratic Alliance	7	0.00	0	New
Hellenic Popular Party	4	0.00	0	New
Self-Respect	2	0.00	0	0
Independents	802	0.01	0	0
Total	6,586,040	100.00	300	0
Valid votes	6,586,040	98.32		
Invalid/blank votes	112,551	1.68		
Total votes	6,698,591	100.00		
Registered voters/turnout	8,453,695	79.24		
Source: Ministry of the Interior
