= June 1989 Greek parliamentary election =

- 18 June 1989

All 300 seats in the Hellenic Parliament 151 seats needed for a majority
- Registered: 8,302,412
- Turnout: 80.33% (▲0.14pp)
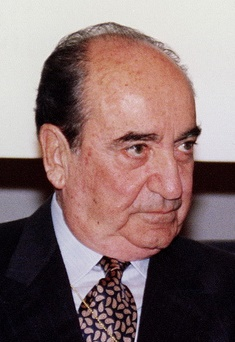

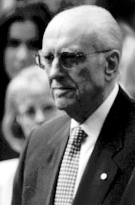

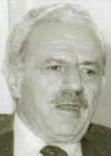
	First party	Second party	Third party
Leader	Konstantinos Mitsotakis	Andreas Papandreou	Charilaos Florakis
Party	ND	PASOK	Synaspismos
Last election	40.84%, 126 seats	45.82%, 161 seats	–
Seats won	145	125	28
Seat change	▲19	▼36	New
Popular vote	2,887,488	2,551,518	855,944
Percentage	44.28%	39.13%	13.13%
Swing	▲3.44 pp	▼6.69 pp	New
Prime Minister before election
Andreas Papandreou
PASOK
Prime Minister after election
Tzannis Tzannetakis
ND

Parliamentary elections were held in Greece on 18 June 1989. The liberal-conservative New Democracy party of Konstantinos Mitsotakis, supported by leftist parties under Synaspismos headed by Charilaos Florakis, defeated the ruling PASOK party of Andreas Papandreou.

The elections took place in a tense and polarized atmosphere, amplified by both sides. New Democracy and Leftist parties under Synaspismos campaigned on accusations of corruption against PASOK amid a series of growing scandals, most notably the Koskotas and Yugoslav corn affairs. In response, Papandreou introduced laws aimed at stalling the investigations and used the state monopoly over mass media to contain the scandals. Moreover, he changed the electoral law shortly before the elections, a move designed to prevent New Democracy from securing an absolute majority. On election day, multiple election irregularities by the state were reported.

New Democracy secured a 5% lead in the popular vote, but the newly revised electoral law prevented it from forming a government. The second party, PASOK also failed to form a government because the other Leftist parties refused to provide support. The stalemate was broken with the unexpected agreement between New Democracy and Synaspismos to form a short-term government with a limited mandate of "katharsis", a thorough investigation of PASOK's corruption. Tzannis Tzannetakis was chosen as a compromise to lead the coalition government and it was dissolved after the indictment of Papandreou and four of his ministers in connection with the Koskotas scandal on 7 October. This marked the first and, as of 2025, the only occasion when the Communist Party of Greece (as part of Synaspismos) joined a governing coalition.

== Background ==
George Koskotas began working at the Bank of Crete in 1979 and quickly accumulated wealth by falsifying bank records. By 1985, he had purchased the bank and used it to build a growing media empire. His rise drew scrutiny, as investigations into rapid media ownership changes in the mid-1980s raised suspicions among publishers and the judiciary. To evade prosecution, he fled to the United States, where he was arrested on unrelated fraud charges. From prison, Koskotas claimed that more than US$200 million missing from his bank had been embezzled with the help of several government ministers and even Papandreou. In exchange, he had used his media outlets to support Papandreou's socialist party (PASOK), even acquiring conservative newspapers once critical of Papandreou. The allegations sparked international attention and political turmoil.

Several months after the arrest of Koskotas, six ministers (including Costas Simitis) resigned in protest of the corruption among the most senior members of PASOK. There were demands for a vote of no confidence against the government, which Papandreou defeated in December 1988 and another one in March 1989. Still, three members of PASOK voted against the party line, however, Papandreou responded by removing them from PASOK, including Antonis Tritsis, who was a founding member of PASOK.

Despite the rising public frustration with the state of affairs, Papandreou abused his position to stay in power since he had successfully removed constitutional restraints in 1985. Notable actions include but are not limited to the following:

- Papandreou changed the electoral law shortly before the elections, a move designed to prevent New Democracy from securing an absolute majority.
- Bestowing public appointments to about 90,000 people to gain additional votes six months before the 1989 elections; Synaspismos political party decried this as a "recruitment orgy." Papandreou's blatant patronage reached the point of giving in one of his rallies a public command to the Minister of Finance Dimitris Tsovolas to "give it all [to them]" (Greek: Τσοβόλα δώσ'τα όλα) and the crowd chanted these back.
- Judicial independence was damaged when Papandreou passed a law via emergency procedures—despite massive backlash from lawyers, judges, and clerks—to prevent the judicial investigation of the Koskotas scandal from advancing to Athens Appeals Court.

== Campaign ==
The election campaigns were conducted under a polarized atmosphere with inflammatory allegations and vitriolic personal attacks, even between the two leaders of the dominant political parties. PASOK's programme avoided mentioning the Koskota scandal and instead emphasized economic modernization with slogans, "For Victory and New Progress", and "PASOK is here: certainty for the present, hope for the future." New Democracy's campaign strategy was based on liberalization of the market, i.e., "free the competitive forces of the market" from the overreaching state, but also criticized PASOK about the scandals with the slogan, "We deserve a better Greece."

On 2 June, Avriani, a tabloid newspaper supporting PASOK, published a transcript of a conversation between Mitsotakis and an unidentified mistress that was supposedly being taped and also claimed to possess 'pornographic' photographs of Mitsotakis but never published them. This was in response to the publication of nude photos of sunbathing Dimitra Liani, Papandreou's then-mistress. The rhetorical confrontation between the two leaders in the campaigns was personal; Papandreou implied that Mitsotakis was a Nazi collaborator during World War II and talked about Mitsotakis' "treachery" against his father's government during the constitutional crisis of Iouliana during the 1965–1967 period. On the other side, Mitsotakis, invoking the Koskotas scandal, talked of Papandreou's "little corrupt team that has looted Greece" and that PASOK was led by "a bunch of thieves." Papandreou's defense was that the scandal was created and used against him: "The Americans and the Right together with the crook Koskotas are conspiring to otherthrow socialism in Greece."

Despite the friction between the two sides in the newspapers, PASOK had the advantage of being the governing party, having control of the state apparatus that provided radio and television services, which became an unconcealed component of PASOK's propaganda. For example, state television programs, including from two foreign cable networks, were interrupted to display Papandreou's final speech at his mass rally in Athens, but no such opportunity was presented for other political leaders.

Weeks before the elections, various terrorist groups advocated to the public to spoil their ballots and used bombs against public buildings, including those of Ministry of Health and the Ministry of Justice.

== Electoral system ==
Since the establishment of the Third Hellenic Republic, Greece conducted parliamentary elections under successive iterations of a system known as "reinforced proportional representation", which was engineered to produce stable single-party majorities in the 300-seat Hellenic Parliament. Prior the June 1989 election, Papandreou further changed the electoral law (Law 1847/1989) to proportional representation making more difficult to secure parliamentary majority. Specifically, of the 300 parliamentary seats, 288 were filled through elections held in 56 constituencies. Five constituencies elected a single representative, while the remaining districts returned between two and 32 members each. Seat allocation occurred in two stages. In the first stage, seats were distributed within each constituency using an electoral quota calculated according to the "plus one" rule, whereby the number of valid votes cast was divided by the number of seats plus one. In the second stage, any remaining seats were allocated across 13 larger constituencies, which corresponded to Greece's 13 regional authorities. At this stage, the electoral quota was calculated by dividing the total number of valid votes remaining after the first distribution within each major constituency by the number of unallocated seats, this time without applying the "plus one" rule.

== Results ==
Irregularities in vote handling and counting were reported on election day. Antonis Tritsis, a PASOK defector and leader of Greek Radical Movement, accused the state officials of not sending his party ballots to many polling stations. Mitsotakis also accused the government of failing to send the election officials to their appointed polling stations or of delaying the opening. Both New Democracy and Synaspismos were irritated by the refusal of the Ministry of Interior to release the official vote count, which was released a week later.

PASOK's electoral percentage dropped to 38%, down from 48% in 1981, primarily due to the fallout from the Koskotas scandal. Although Mitsotakis' New Democracy party secured 43%, it was insufficient to form a government, as Papandreou's last-minute change of the electoral law required a party to win 50% of the vote to govern alone. Mitsotakis made an offer to Charilaos Florakis, head of Synaspismos, but it was rejected. Papandreou had designed the electoral law so that PASOK, even if it came in second, could form a government with the backing of other leftist parties, but his offer to Florakis was also rejected.

Party	Votes	%	Seats	+/–
New Democracy	2,887,488	44.28	145	19
Panhellenic Socialist Movement	2,551,518	39.13	125	–36
Coalition of the Left and Progress	855,944	13.13	28	New
Democratic Renewal	65,614	1.01	1	New
Trust	25,099	0.38	1	New
National Party–National Political Union	21,149	0.32	0	0
KKE Interior – Renewing Left	18,159	0.28	0	New
Greek Socialist Party	13,863	0.21	0	New
Christian Democracy	11,450	0.18	0	New
Fate	9,064	0.14	0	New
Liberal Party	9,001	0.14	0	0
Ecologist Movement – Political Renewal	8,182	0.13	0	New
Union of the Democratic Centre	7,770	0.12	0	New
Alternative Anti-Capitalist Cohesion	6,185	0.09	0	New
Direct Democracy	5,939	0.09	0	New
Greek Radical Movement	4,162	0.06	0	New
Greek Orthodox Movement for Salvation	3,756	0.06	0	New
Communist Party of Greece (Marxist–Leninist)	3,350	0.05	0	New
Revolutionary Communist Movement of Greece	2,709	0.04	0	0
Fighting Socialist Party of Greece	2,317	0.04	0	0
Self-Governed Movement of Labour Politics	1,912	0.03	0	New
Marxist–Leninist Communist Party of Greece	1,636	0.03	0	New
Labour Anti-Imperialistic Movement	1,432	0.02	0	New
Olympic Party	1,229	0.02	0	New
Organization for the Reconstruction of the KKE	873	0.01	0	New
Panhellenic Ecological Movement	403	0.01	0	New
Independent Personalities	113	0.00	0	New
Integrated Social Union	65	0.00	0	New
Independent Movement of Democratic Refresh	54	0.00	0	New
Collaboration Alliance of Independent Candidate MPs	28	0.00	0	New
Panhellenic Uncommitted Party of Equality	26	0.00	0	New
Federal Democratic Party of Greece	25	0.00	0	New
Party of Humanism and Peace	15	0.00	0	New
Independent Radical Spring Renewal	10	0.00	0	New
Independent Social Democratic Revival	10	0.00	0	New
Olympic Democracy	2	0.00	0	0
Independents	659	0.01	0	0
Total	6,521,211	100.00	300	0
Valid votes	6,521,211	97.78		
Invalid/blank votes	148,017	2.22		
Total votes	6,669,228	100.00		
Registered voters/turnout	8,302,412	80.33		
Source: Nohlen & Stöver

== Aftermath ==
The failure of the two major parties to secure enough support to form a government led to a hung parliament. The impasse was resolved when Florakis announced "a broadly based consensus government under a neutral prime minister" on 27 June 1989. Mitsotakis agreed to step down and Tzannis Tzannetakis served as prime minister for the coalition government, marking a historic compromise. Despite their opposing ideologies and their division during the Greek Civil War both sides sought a "katharsis", a thorough investigation into PASOK's corruption. This decision carried significant weight, as failing to bring charges against Papandreou under this coalition would prevent any future government from doing so according to the Greek constitution. The participation of Synaspismos in the government also marked the end of the militarized politics of the past, since there was no reaction from the military. Papandreou denounced the collaborative government as "unholy and unprincipled", and he ordered his ministers not to cooperate in the handover of power, and official documents and state treaties went missing.

The coalition government indicted Papandreou and four of his ministers on 28 September 1989, after which it was dissolved and new elections took place in November 1989. Moreover, to avoid political exploitation from any future omnipotent prime minister, it dismantled some of the state's surveillance infrastructure and granted the first private television broadcast license to publishers critical to PASOK as a counterbalance to state media.

== Notes ==
1. The size of the money embezzled was unprecedented, as a diplomat based in Athens described it: "A quarter to a third of a billion dollars in a country whose legal economy is only about $42 billion, [...] this thing is Drexel [Burnham] Lambert, Ivan Boesky and Billy Sol Estes rolled into one."
2. While it is frequent in Greek history for the governing party to change the electoral law for its purposes, Papandreou's electoral law change in 1989 was unique as it personally benefited him to avoid an indictment for the Koskotas scandal and be sentenced to life in prison if convicted.

== Sources ==
=== Books ===
- Bellou, Fotini; Couloumbis, Theodore A.; Kariotis, Theodore C., eds. (2003). Greece in the twentieth century. London & New York: Routledge. ISBN 9780203045893.
  - Afentouli, Ino. "The Greek media landscape". In Bellou, Couloumbis & Kariotis (2003), pp. 170–182.
- Clogg, Richard (2013). A Concise History of Greece. Cambridge: Cambridge University Press. ISBN 9781107656444.
- Close, David H. (2014). Greece since 1945: Politics, Economy and Society. London & New York: Taylor & Francis. ISBN 9781317880011.
- Featherstone, Kevin; Sotiropoulos, Dimitri A., eds. (2020). The Oxford Handbook of Modern Greek Politics. Oxford: Oxford University Press. ISBN 978-0198825104.
  - Dinas, Eias. "The Electoral System". In Featherstone & Sotiropoulos (2020), pp. 203–218.
- Featherstone, Kevin; Katsoudas, Dimitrios K., eds. (1987). Political change in Greece: Before and after the colonels. London & New York: Taylor & Francis. ISBN 9781000992144.
  - Featherstone, Kevin. "Elections and Voting Behavior". In Featherstone & Katsoudas (1987), pp. 34–63.
- Featherstone, Kevin; Papadimitriou, Dimitris (2015). Prime Ministers in Greece, The Paradox of Power. Oxford: Oxford University Press. ISBN 978-0198717171.
- Gallant, Thomas W. (2016). Modern Greece: From the war of independence to the present. London: Bloomsbury Publishing. ISBN 9781350014510.
- Garrard, James; Newell, John, eds. (2006). Scandals in past and contemporary politics. Manchester: Manchester University Press. ISBN 9780719065514.
  - Koutsoukis, Kleomenis S. "Political scandals and crisis management in Greece, 1821-2001". In Garrard & Newell (2006), pp. 123–136.
- Gunther, Richard; Diamandouros, Nikiforos; Sotiropoulos, Dimitri, eds. (2006). Democracy and the state in the new southern Europe. Oxford: Oxford University Press. ISBN 9780191513961.
  - Magalhaes, Pedro C.; Guarnieri, Carlo; Kaminis, Yorgos. "Democratic consolidation, judicial reform, and the judicialization of politics in Southern Europe". In Gunther, Diamandouros & Sotiropoulos (2006), pp. 138–196.
- Kaplan, Robert D. (1994). Balkan Ghosts, A Journey Through History. London: Vintage Books. ISBN 0679749810.
- Koliopoulos, John S.; Veremis, Thanos M. [in Greek] (2009). Modern Greece A History Since 1821. Oxford: Wiley-Blackwell. ISBN 9781444314830.
- Lodge, Juliet, ed. (1990). The 1989 Election of the European Parliament. New York: Palgrave Macmillan. ISBN 9781349108930.
  - Featherstone, Kevin; Verney, Susannah. "Greece". In Lodge (1990), pp. 90–106.
- Magone, José (2003). The Politics of Southern Europe Integration Into the European Union. Santa Barbara: ABC-CLIO. ISBN 9780313051678.
- Nohlen, Dieter; Stöver, Philip, eds. (2010). Elections in Europe: A data handbook. Baden-Baden: Nomos. ISBN 978-3-8329-5609-7.
- Pappas, Takis S. (2019). Populism and liberal democracy: A comparative and theoretical analysis. Oxford: Oxford University Press. ISBN 9780192574893.
- Pirounakis, Nicholas (1997). The Greek Economy Past, Present and Future. London: Palgrave Macmillan. ISBN 978-0333654224.
- Sassoon, Donald, ed. (1997). Looking left: European socialism after the Cold War. London: I.B. Taurus. ISBN 1860641792.
  - Fouskas, Vassilis. "The Left and the crisis of the Third Hellenic Republic, 1989-97". In Sassoon (1997), pp. 64–87.
- Siani-Davies, Peter (2017). Crisis in Greece. Oxford: Oxford University Press. ISBN 9780190911539.

=== Journals ===
- Clive, Nigel (1990). "The Dilemmas of Democracy in Greece". Government and Opposition. 25 (1): 115–122. doi:10.1111/j.1477-7053.1990.tb00750.x. JSTOR 44482490.
- Dimitras, Panayote Elias (1985). "The Greek parliamentary election of 1985". Electoral Studies. 4 (3): 261–265. doi:10.1016/0261-3794(85)90019-8. ISSN 0261-3794.
- Dobratz, Betty A.; Whitfield, Stefanie (1992). "Does Scandal Influence Voters' Party Preference? The Case of Greece during the Papandreou Era". European Sociological Review. 8 (2): 167–180. doi:10.1093/oxfordjournals.esr.a036630. JSTOR 522295.
- Featherstone, Kevin (1990). "The 'party‐state' in Greece and the fall of Papandreou". West European Politics. 13 (1): 101–115. doi:10.1080/01402389008424782.
- Papathanassopoulos, Stylianos (1990). "Broadcasting, politics and the state in Socialist Greece". Media, Culture & Society. 12 (3): 387–397. doi:10.1177/016344390012003007.
- Samatas, Minas (1993). "The Populist Phase of an Underdeveloped Surveillance Society: Political Surveillance in Post-Dictatorial Greece". Journal of the Hellenic Diaspora. 19 (1): 31–70.

=== Newspapers ===
- "Papandreou Survives No-Confidence Motion". The New York Times. 14 March 1989.
- Marlise Simons (17 January 1992). "Greek ex-premier not guilty in bank scandal". The New York Times.
- Stephen Brookes (6 March 1989). "Awash in Scandal, Greece Wrestles its Political Furies". Athens: Insight Magazine.
