= 1993 Greek parliamentary election =

- 10 October 1993

All 300 seats in the Hellenic Parliament 151 seats needed for a majority
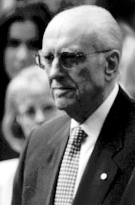

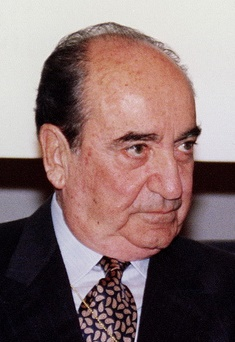

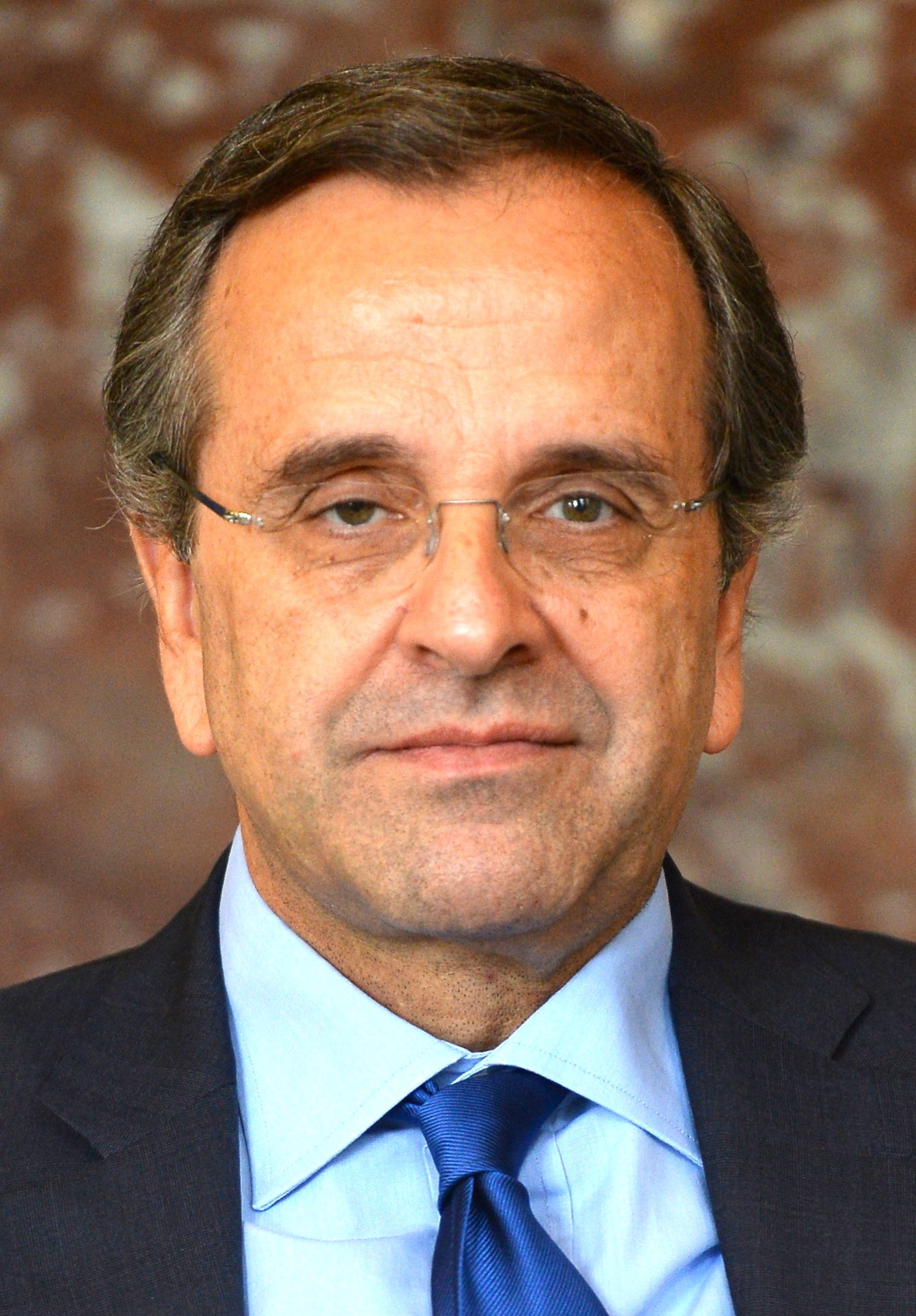

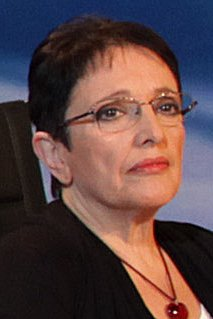
	First party	Second party
Leader	Andreas Papandreou	Konstantinos Mitsotakis
Party	PASOK	ND
Last election	38.61%, 123 seats	46.89%, 150 seats
Seats won	170	111
Seat change	▲47	▼39
Popular vote	3,235,017	2,711,739
Percentage	46.88%	39.30%
Swing	▲8.27 pp	▼7.59 pp
	Third party	Fourth party
Leader	Antonis Samaras	Aleka Papariga
Party	POLAN	KKE
Last election	–	(Note: Part of Synaspismos alliance)
Seats won	10	9
Seat change	New	–
Popular vote	336,460	313,001
Percentage	4.88%	4.54%
Swing	New	–
- Results by constituency
Prime Minister before election
Konstantinos Mitsotakis
ND
Prime Minister after election
Andreas Papandreou
PASOK

Parliamentary elections were held in Greece on 10 October 1993. PASOK of Andreas Papandreou, was elected with 170 of the 300 seats, defeating the liberal-conservative New Democracy party of Konstantinos Mitsotakis.

== Results ==
Party	Votes	%	Seats	+/–
Panhellenic Socialist Movement	3,235,017	46.88	170	+47
New Democracy	2,711,737	39.30	111	–39
Political Spring	336,460	4.88	10	New
Communist Party of Greece	313,001	4.54	9	–
Coalition of the Left and Progress	202,887	2.94	0	–
Trust	26,228	0.38	0	–1
Union of Centrists	15,926	0.23	0	New
Fate	12,458	0.18	0	–1
National Party – National Political Union	9,469	0.14	0	0
Left Struggle	8,160	0.12	0	0
Popular Unions of Bipartisan Social Groups	7,237	0.10	0	0
Ecologists of Greece	5,723	0.08	0	0
Union of Ecologists	5,378	0.08	0	0
Party of Greek Hunters	3,614	0.05	0	0
Marxist–Leninist Communist Party of Greece	1,817	0.03	0	0
Fighting Socialist Party of Greece	1,578	0.02	0	New
Olympic Party	753	0.01	0	0
Organization for the Reconstruction of the KKE	703	0.01	0	New
Consistent Left Move of Greece	484	0.01	0	New
Self-Respect and Truth	334	0.00	0	New
Human Rights Party	255	0.00	0	0
Christopistía	66	0.00	0	New
Hellenic Orthodox Democratic Movement	41	0.00	0	New
Political Independent Party "Vergina 1990"	33	0.00	0	New
Hellenic White Movement of Contemporary Ideology	30	0.00	0	New
Party of Responsible Citizens	19	0.00	0	New
Humanism and Peace Party	18	0.00	0	0
Free Democrats Party of Greece	16	0.00	0	New
Greens	6	0.00	0	New
Independents	863	0.01	0	–4
Total	6,900,311	100.00	300	0
Valid votes	6,900,311	98.30		
Invalid/blank votes	119,614	1.70		
Total votes	7,019,925	100.00		
Registered voters/turnout	8,861,833	79.22		
Source: Nohlen & Stöver
