= November 1989 Greek parliamentary election =

- 5 November 1989

All 300 seats in the Hellenic Parliament 151 seats needed for a majority
- Registered: 8,425,212
- Turnout: 80.70% (▲0.37pp)
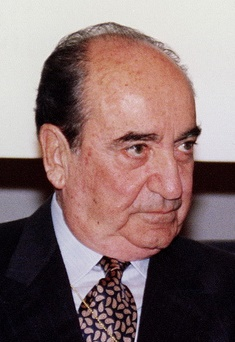

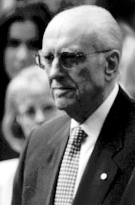

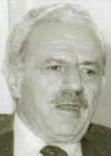
	First party	Second party	Third party
Leader	Konstantinos Mitsotakis	Andreas Papandreou	Charilaos Florakis
Party	ND	PASOK	Synaspismos
Last election	44.28%, 145 seats	39.13%, 125 seats	13.13%, 28 seats
Seats won	148	128	21
Seat change	▲3	▲3	▼7
Popular vote	3,093,055	2,723,739	734,552
Percentage	46.19%	40.67%	10.97%
Swing	▲1.91 pp	▲1.55 pp	▼2.16 pp
	Fourth party	Fifth party	Sixth party
Leader	Dimitris Chatzhpanagiotou	Sadik Achmet	Achmet Faikoglu
Party	OE	Trust	Fate
Last election	–	0.38%, 1 seat	0.14%, 0 seats
Seats won	1	1	1
Seat change	New	Steady	▲1
Popular vote	39,130	26,012	10,971
Percentage	0.58%	0.39%	0.16%
Swing	New	▼0.01 pp	▲0.04 pp
Prime Minister before election
Giannis Grivas
Independent
Prime Minister after election
Xenophon Zolotas
Independent

Early parliamentary elections were held in Greece on 5 November 1989. The liberal-conservative New Democracy party of Konstantinos Mitsotakis emerged as the largest party in Parliament, defeating PASOK of Andreas Papandreou. However, as in June 1989, Mitsotakis was unable to form a government since his party had failed to win a majority of seats. A National Unity government was formed under Xenophon Zolotas (a retired banker at the age of 85) as a way out of the deadlock and to restore public trust in political institutions after the recent indictments of Papandreou and four of his ministers for the Koskotas scandal.

== Results ==
Party	Votes	%	Seats	+/–
New Democracy	3,093,055	46.19	148	+3
Panhellenic Socialist Movement	2,723,739	40.67	128	+3
Coalition of the Left and Progress	734,552	10.97	21	–7
Alternative Ecologists	39,130	0.58	1	New
Trust	26,012	0.39	1	0
Left Initiative of Communist Radical Ecologists (AKOA–EKKE)	13,461	0.20	0	New
Kollatos–Independent Political Movement–Ecologic–Hellenic	13,058	0.19	0	New
Fate	10,971	0.16	1	+1
Ecologists of Greece	10,223	0.15	0	New
Liberal Party	5,125	0.08	0	0
Popular Unions of Bipartisan Social Groups	4,410	0.07	0	New
Communist Party of Greece (Marxist–Leninist)	3,188	0.05	0	0
Fighting Socialist Party of Greece	1,602	0.02	0	0
Marxist–Leninist Communist Party of Greece	1,422	0.02	0	0
Labour Anti-Imperialistic Front	1,384	0.02	0	0
Self-Governed Movement of Labour Politics	1,259	0.02	0	0
Workers Revolutionary Party – Trotskyists	1,104	0.02	0	New
Olympic Party	840	0.01	0	0
Organization for the Reconstruction of the Communist Party of Greece	614	0.01	0	0
National Front of National Fighters	99	0.00	0	New
Independent Party of Democratic Revival	61	0.00	0	New
Hellenists Party	53	0.00	0	New
Greens Ecological Party of Greece–Hellenic Alternative Green Movement	46	0.00	0	New
Olympic Democracy	32	0.00	0	0
Revolutionary-Popular Executive Committee "Care"	22	0.00	0	New
Independent Social Democratic Revival	21	0.00	0	0
Humanism and Peace Party	15	0.00	0	New
Regional Civic Development	12	0.00	0	New
Hellenic Social Democratic Revolutionary Liberation Front "Spartacus"	9	0.00	0	New
Movement of Non-Privileged	4	0.00	0	New
Hellenic European Party	3	0.00	0	New
Self-Respect	2	0.00	0	New
Hellenic European Party 1984	1	0.00	0	New
Independents	11,563	0.17	0	0
Total	6,697,092	100.00	300	0
Valid votes	6,697,092	98.50		
Invalid/blank votes	101,917	1.50		
Total votes	6,799,009	100.00		
Registered voters/turnout	8,425,212	80.70		
Source: Nohlen & Stöver
