= Mitsotakis family =

Cretan political family

The Mitsotakis family (Greek: Μητσοτάκης) is a political family originating from the Chania region of Crete, with a long tradition. According to Professor Nikolaos V. Tomadakis, its ultimate origin was from the important Andreadakis clan, from the village of Chordaki in Akrotiri.

The name of the Mitsotakis family comes from the Cretan "mitsos" (el= μιτσός), which means child, little boy, which is why the original form of the family surname was Mitsotakis (el= Μιτσοτάκης), a form that survives to this day.

The ancestor Kostis Mitsotakis (1845–1898), the so-called Gero-Kostis or Gerokostis, married Katingo (Aikaterini) Venizelou, sister of Eleftherios Venizelos, through whom the Mitsotakis family became related to the Venizelos family. He was the founder of the so-called "Barefoot Party", which was later taken over by Eleftherios Venizelos and transformed into the Liberal Party Kyriakos K. Mitsotakis (1883–1944), son of the elder Kostis, served as a member of parliament for Chania, as did his brother Aristomenis Mitsotakis, who also served as Minister of National Economy in the government of Alexandros Papanastasiou and Deputy Speaker of the Hellenic Parliament.

Konstantinos Mitsotakis (1918–2017) served as Prime Minister of Greece from 1990 to 1993; his daughter Dora Bakoyannis is currently a member of parliament for Chania and has served as Minister of Foreign Affairs, Minister of Culture and Mayor of Athens. His son, Kyriakos Mitsotakis, serves as Prime Minister of Greece after his election on 7 July 2019, having previously served as Minister of Administrative Reform and E-Government and Leader of the Official Opposition.

== Notable people ==
- Kostis Mitsotakis (1845–1898), patriarch of the family, brother-in-law of Eleftherios Venizelos
- Kyriakos Mitsotakis (1883–1944), son of Kostis
- Konstantinos Mitsotakis (1918–2017), son of Kyriakos
- Marika Mitsotakis (1930–2012), wife of Konstantinos
- Dora Bakoyannis (born 1954), daughter of Konstantinos & Marika
- Alexandra Mitsotakis (born 1955), daughter of Konstantinos & Marika
- Aikaterini Mitsotakis (born 1959), daughter of Konstantinos & Marika
- Kyriakos Mitsotakis (born 1968), son of Konstantinos & Marika
- Kostas Bakoyannis (born 1978), son of Pavlos & Dora
- Mareva Grabowski-Mitsotakis (born 1967), wife Kyriakos
