= Venizelos family =

The Venizelos family (Greek: Βενιζέλος) is a family of politicians from Chania, Crete, whose members distinguished themselves in the political arena. Its most important representative is considered to be Eleftherios Venizelos.

There is a dispute about the origin of the Venizelos family. Specifically, the prevailing view is that the ancestor of Eleftherios Venizelos was Benizelos Krevvatas, a scion of a hegemonic family of Mystras, who, in order to escape the massacres of the Turks, due to his family's participation in the Orlov revolt (1770), fled to Kythira and from there, after marrying, to Chania.

The surname "Venizelos" also came from his name. This particular view is disputed by several historians who argue that there is no relationship between the Venizelos and Krevvatas families. In 1912, Konstantinos Krevvatas, a politician and prefect of Messinia, disputed the theory of his family's kinship with that of Venizelos. However, it is not ruled out that Eleftherios Venizelos grandfather was Hantzi-Petros Benizelos, a merchant in Kythira who had no connection with the Krevvatas family.

== Notable people ==
- Katigo Venizelou (1858–1934), wife of Kostis Mitsotakis, sister of Eleftherios
- Eleftherios Venizelos (1864–1936), Prime Minister of Greece
- Sofoklis Venizelos (1894–1964), Prime Minister of Greece, son of Eleftherios
- Nikitas Venizelos (1930–2020), grandson of Eleftherios
