= Sofoklis Venizelos =

Greek politician (1894–1964)

- Σοφοκλής Βενιζέλος
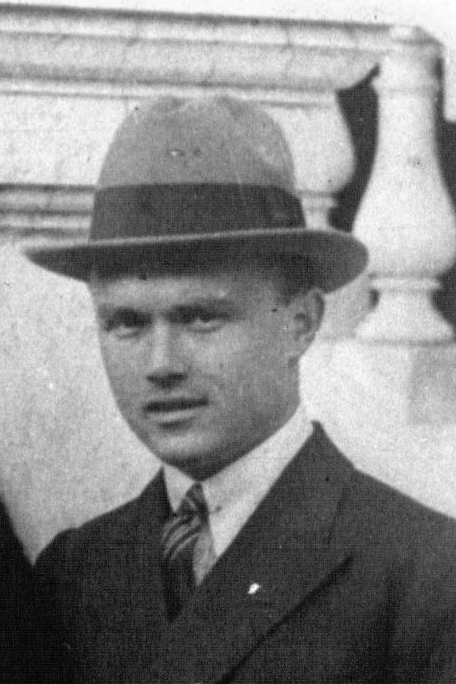

Prime Minister of Greece
- In office 21 August 1950 – 27 October 1951
- Monarch: Paul
- Preceded by: Nikolaos Plastiras
- Succeeded by: Nikolaos Plastiras
- In office 23 March 1950 – 15 April 1950
- Monarch: Paul
- Preceded by: Ioannis Theotokis
- Succeeded by: Nikolaos Plastiras
- In exile 14 April 1944 – 26 April 1944
- Monarch: George II
- Preceded by: Emmanouil Tsouderos
- Succeeded by: Georgios Papandreou

Deputy Prime Minister of Greece
- In office 8 November 1963 – 30 December 1963
- Monarch: Paul
- Prime Minister: Georgios Papandreou
- Preceded by: Panagiotis Kanellopoulos
- Succeeded by: Stefanos Stefanopoulos
- In office 27 October 1951 – 11 October 1952
- Monarch: Paul
- Prime Minister: Nikolaos Plastiras
- Preceded by: Emmanouil Tsouderos
- Succeeded by: Panagiotis Kanellopoulos
- In office 30 June 1949 – 6 January 1950
- Monarch: Paul
- Prime Minister: Alexandros Diomidis
- Preceded by: Konstantinos Tsaldaris
- Succeeded by: Panagiotis Kanellopoulos
- In office 24 January 1947 – 29 August 1947
- Monarch: Paul
- Prime Minister: Dimitrios Maximos
- Preceded by: Konstantinos Tsaldaris
- Succeeded by: Konstantinos Tsaldaris
- In office 24 May 1944 – 30 August 1944
- Monarch: George II
- Prime Minister: Georgios Papandreou
- Preceded by: Georgios Rousos
- Succeeded by: Kyriakos Varvaresos

Minister of National Defense
- In office 10 April 1952 – 24 July 1952
- Monarch: Paul
- Prime Minister: Nikolaos Plastiras
- Preceded by: Alexandros Sakellariou
- Succeeded by: Georgios Mavros
- In office 21 August 1950 – 9 September 1950
- Monarch: Paul
- Prime Minister: Himself
- Preceded by: Philippos Manoulidis
- Succeeded by: Konstantinos Rendis

Personal details
- Born: 3 November 1894 Chania, Vilayet of Crete, Ottoman Empire (present-day Greece)
- Died: 7 February 1964 (aged 69) on board SS Hellas, Aegean Sea
- Party: Liberal Party; Centre Union
- Spouse: Kathleen Zervoudaki
- Relations: Kyriakos Venizelos (brother); Nikitas Venizelos (nephew); Konstantinos Mitsotakis (nephew); Dora Bakoyannis (great-niece); Alexandra Mitsotaki (great-niece); Kyriakos Mitsotakis (great-nephew)
- Children: Despina Venizelou-Laskari
- Parent(s): Eleftherios Venizelos; Maria Katelouzou
- Education: Hellenic Army Academy

Military service
- Allegiance: Kingdom of Greece
- Branch/service: Hellenic Army
- Years of service: 1911-1920; 1922-1930
- Rank: Colonel
- Battles/wars: World War I; Macedonian front; Greco-Turkish War (1919-1922)

Sofoklis (Note: Also transliterated as Sophocles or Sophoklis.) Venizelos (Greek: Σοφοκλής Βενιζέλος; 3 November 1894 – 7 February 1964) was a Greek politician who served three times as Prime Minister of Greece: in 1944 (in exile), 1950 and 1950–1951.

== Early life ==
Venizelos was born on 3 November 1894 in Chania, Crete (then a part of the Ottoman Empire; it became an autonomous state under Ottoman suzerainty and the protection of Russia, Britain, France, and Italy in 1898). He was the second-born son of the politician Eleftherios Venizelos. His mother died due to his birth.

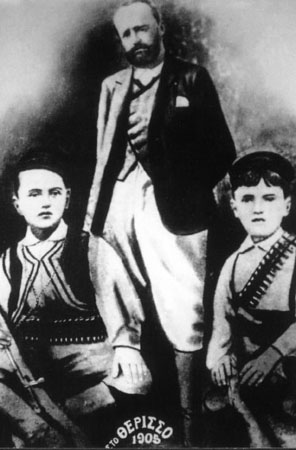
Sophoklis Venizelos with his father Eleftherios and his brother Kyriakos in 1905, during the Theriso revolt.

== Military service ==
During World War I, he served with distinction in the Hellenic Army and the initial phases of the Asia Minor campaign, where he served as a Captain of the Infantry.

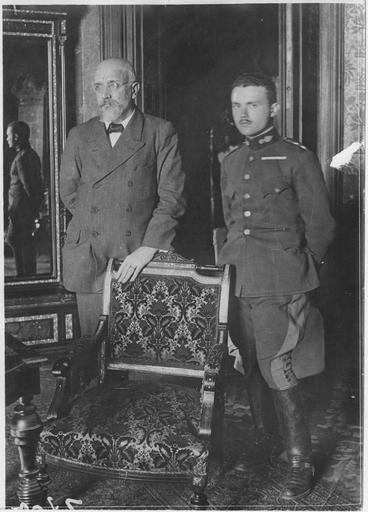
Sofoklis with his father, Eleftherios Venizelos, c. 1916

In 1920, resigned his commission for a brief stint in politics before returning to service. It was also during this time that he married Kathleen Zervoudaki in 1921. He re-entered service in 1922 and was appointed as the military attaché in Paris. He held this post for eight years before retiring as a Colonel.

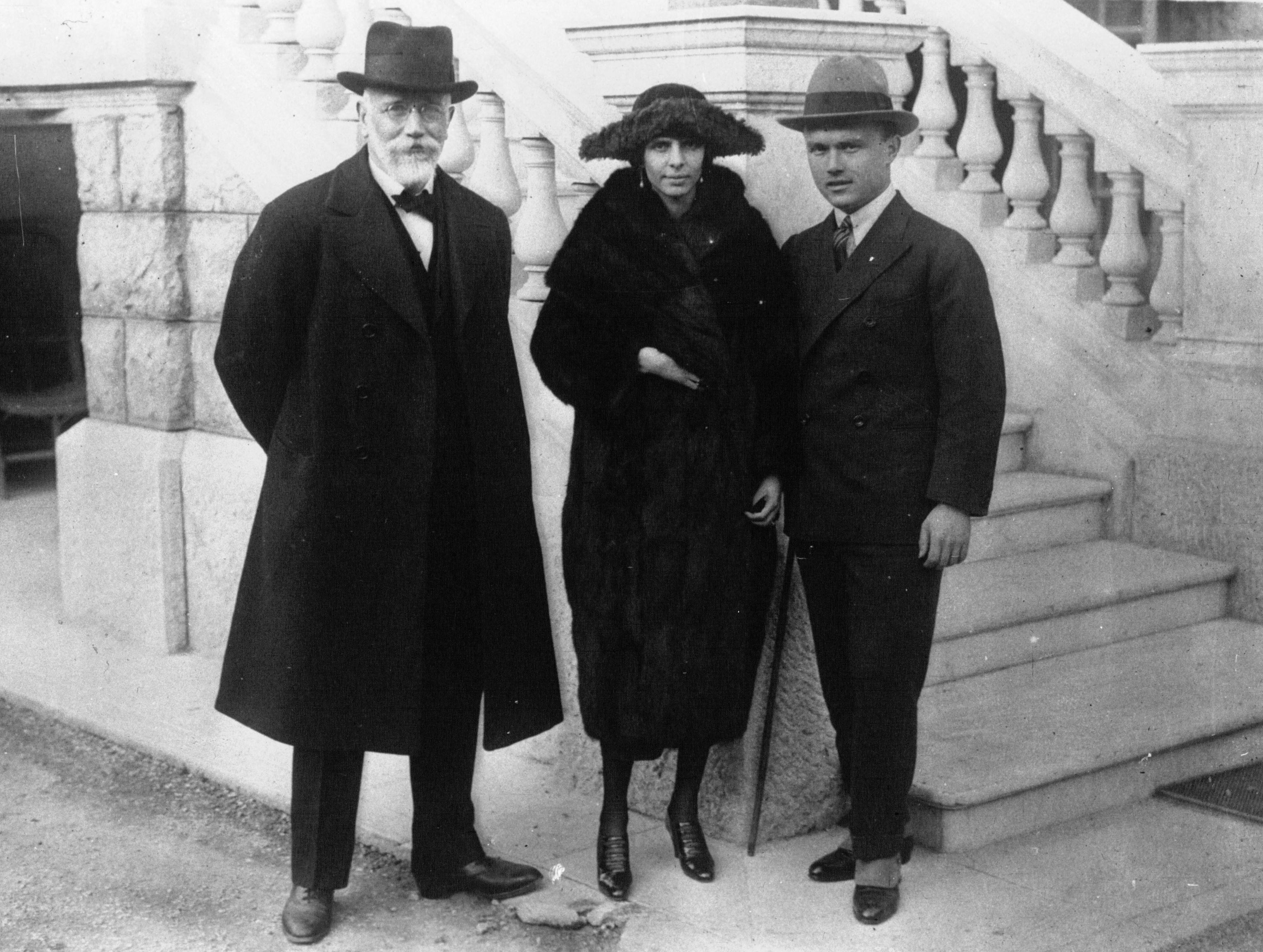
Venizelos (standing right) with his father and Ms. Kathleen Zervoudaki, a few days after their wedding, Nice, 1921.

== Political career ==
During his two year hiatus from the army, he was elected as an MP with his father's Liberal Party in the 1920 elections. In 1941, after the Axis occupation of Greece, he became ambassador to the United States, representing the Greek government in exile based in Cairo. He became a minister of that government in 1943 under Prime Minister Emmanuel Tsouderos and briefly became its prime minister in 1944 (April 13–26).

After the end of the war, he returned to Greece, where he became Vice President of the Liberal Party (led by Themistoklis Sofoulis) and a minister in the first post-war government led by Georgios Papandreou.

In 1948, he assumed the party's leadership and became a minister in several short-lived liberal governments led by Papandreou and Nikolaos Plastiras; he was also the Prime Minister of three such governments.

In 1954, his longtime friendship with Georgios Papandreou was shaken, and he formed the rival Liberal Democratic Union coalition.

The rift was bridged in 1958, and in 1961, he became a founding member of Papandreou's Center Union party, which he served until he died in 1964.

== Death ==
On 6 February 1964, in the evening, he gave a pre-election speech in Chania. There, he had felt unwell, which he overcame. Later, he boarded the passenger ship Hellas in the Aegean Sea, en route from Chania to Piraeus or Syros. In the cabin, he felt discomfort and had shortness of breath. His attending physician diagnosed acute pulmonary edema. Venizelos died at 01:05 on 7 February. The ship returned to Souda. His funeral took place on 9 February in Chania, in the presence of Crown Prince Constantine (who represented the ailing King Paul), Prime Minister Ioannis Paraskevopoulos, Georgios Papandreou, Panagiotis Kanellopoulos, Spyros Markezinis, and Nicolas Kitsikis. Venizelos was buried next to his father, Eleftherios Venizelos. His wife Kathleen died in 1983, aged 86. In his honor, the shipping company ANEK Lines named one of its ferries after him.

== Bridge ==
Venizelos was a contract bridge player "of international stature" during the 1930s as a voluntary exile in France. He played for France in the European IBL Championships (later incorporated into the history of present-day European Bridge League championships). France won the 1935 tournament and a version of the team (Note: Aron and Joseph Broutin did not make the trip to New York, and only one substitute replaced them: "Emanuel Tulmaris, retired Trieste banker and a bobsled enthusiast". The American star Oswald Jacoby missed at least the opening night.) traveled to New York City late that year for a match against the Four Aces, which was "an unofficial world championship match" that the Aces won.

Venizelos was second in skill to Pierre Albarran among contemporary French players, according to Alan Truscott. Besides the national teams at contract bridge, they both played on a 1933 team that hosted an American foursome led by Ely Culbertson in a long match at "plafond, the French parent of contract bridge, which differed only in the scoring details." The two teams played 102 deals to a draw; Albarran and Venizelos cooperated on a book reporting and analysing the match:

- Les 102 donnes d'un grand match, by Pierre Albarran, Adrien Aron, and Venizelos, preface by Ely Culbertson (Éditions Grasset, 1933), 188 pp., LCCN 33-38010

Albarran, Aron, and Venizelos were three of six players on the 1935 European champion team.

== Venizelos/Mitsotakis family tree ==
Main members of the Venizelos/Mitsotakis family. Prime Ministers of Greece are highlighted in light blue.

Kyriakos Venizelos (?–1883)	Styliani Ploumidaki (1830–1897)
Eleftherios Venizelos (1864–1936)	Katingo Venizelou (1858–1934)	Constantine "Costis" Mitsotakis (1845–1898)
Kyriakos Venizelos (1892–1942)	Sofoklis Venizelos (1894–1964)	Kyriakos Mitsotakis (1892–1942)	Stavroula Ploumidaki (1896–1983)
Nikitas Venizelos (1930–2020)	Konstantinos Mitsotakis (1918–2017)	Marika Giannoukou (1930–2012)
Pavlos Bakoyannis (1935–1989)	Dora Bakoyanni née Mitsotaki (b. 1954)	Kyriakos Mitsotakis (b. 1968)
Kostas Bakoyannis (b. 1978)

== Notes ==
Political offices
Preceded by Emmanouil Tsouderos	Prime Minister of Greece; April 13, 1944 – April 26, 1944 (in exile in Cairo)	Succeeded by Georgios Papandreou
Preceded by Ioannis Theotokis	Prime Minister of Greece; March 23, 1950 – April 15, 1950	Succeeded by Nikolaos Plastiras
Preceded by Nikolaos Plastiras	Prime Minister of Greece; August 21, 1950 – November 1, 1951	Succeeded by Nikolaos Plastiras
Preceded by Philippos Manouilides	Minister for National Defence of Greece; 21 August – 9 September 1950	Succeeded by Konstantinos Rendis
Preceded by Alexandros Sakellariou	Minister for National Defence of Greece; 10 April – 24 July 1952	Succeeded by Georgios Mavros
