= Kyriakos Mitsotakis =

Prime Minister of Greece since 2019

His Excellency Kyriakos Mitsotakis
- Κυριάκος Μητσοτάκης
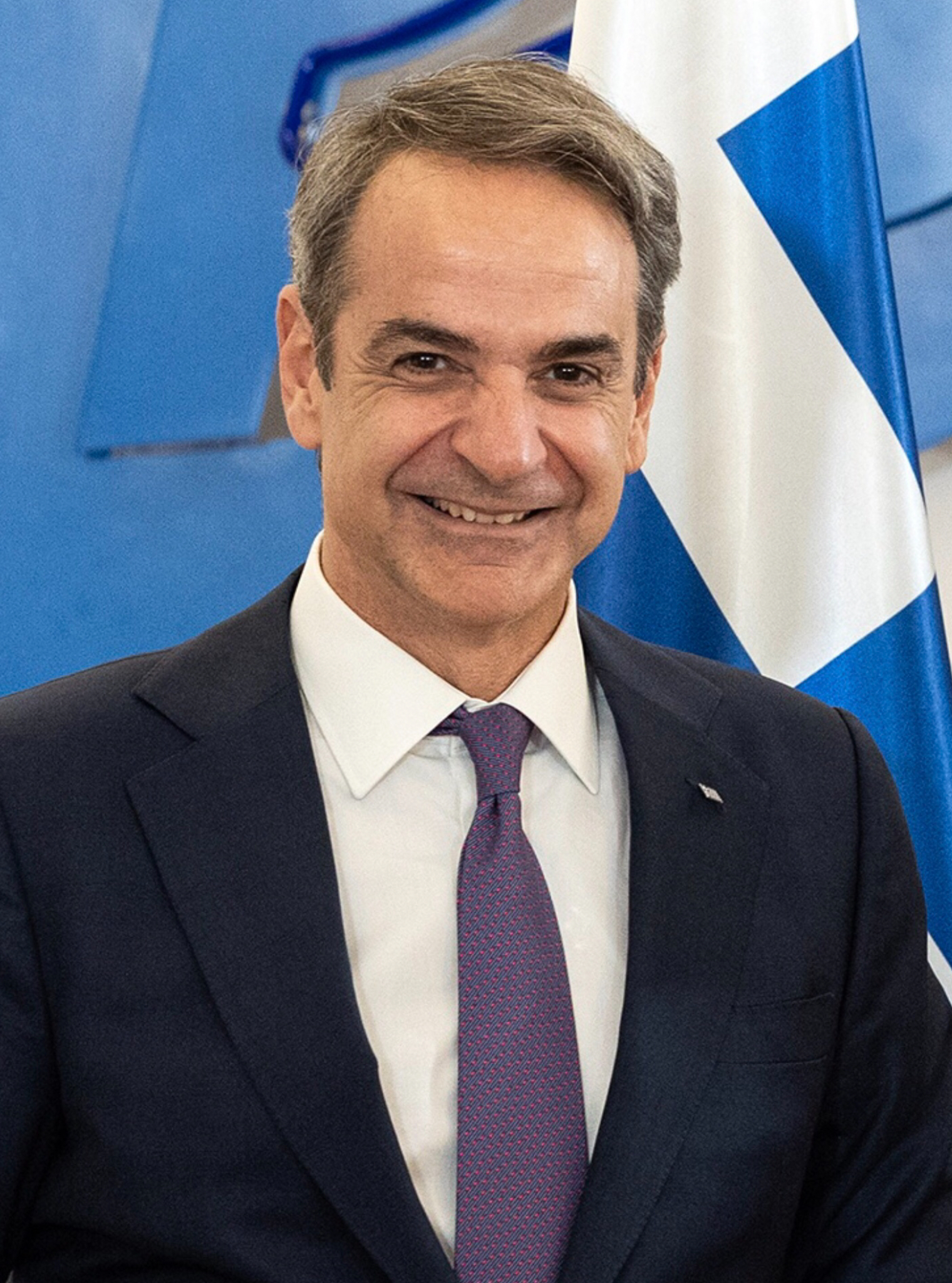
- Mitsotakis in 2026

Prime Minister of Greece
- Incumbent
- Assumed office 26 June 2023
- President: Katerina Sakellaropoulou; Konstantinos Tasoulas
- Deputy: Kostis Hatzidakis
- Preceded by: Ioannis Sarmas (caretaker)
- In office 8 July 2019 – 25 May 2023
- President: Prokopis Pavlopoulos; Katerina Sakellaropoulou
- Deputy: Panayiotis Pikrammenos
- Preceded by: Alexis Tsipras
- Succeeded by: Ioannis Sarmas (caretaker)

Leader of the Opposition
- In office 10 January 2016 – 8 July 2019
- Prime Minister: Alexis Tsipras
- Preceded by: Giannis Plakiotakis
- Succeeded by: Alexis Tsipras
Other political offices
President of New Democracy
Incumbent
Assumed office 10 January 2016
Vice President	Adonis Georgiadis; Kostis Hatzidakis
Preceded by	Giannis Plakiotakis (interim)
Minister of Administrative Reform and Electronic Governance
In office 25 June 2013 – 27 January 2015
Prime Minister	Antonis Samaras; Alexis Tsipras
Preceded by	Antonis Manitakis
Succeeded by	Nikos Voutsis
Member of the Hellenic Parliament
Incumbent
Assumed office 7 March 2004
Constituency	Thessaloniki A (2023–present); Athens B2 (2019–2023); Athens B (2004–2019)

Personal details
- Born: 4 March 1968 (age 58) Athens, Kingdom of Greece (now Greece)
- Party: New Democracy
- Spouse: Mareva Grabowski (m. 1997)
- Children: 3
- Parents: Konstantinos Mitsotakis (father); Marika Giannoukou (mother)
- Relatives: Alexandra Mitsotaki (sister); Dora Bakoyanni (sister); Kostas Bakoyannis (nephew); Eleftherios Venizelos (great-uncle)
- Education: Athens College; Harvard University (BA, MBA); Stanford University (MA)
- Awards: Alexis de Tocqueville Prize (1990)

Kyriakos Mitsotakis (Greek: Κυριάκος Μητσοτάκης, IPA: [cirˈʝakos mit͡soˈtacis]; born 4 March 1968) is a Greek politician, and the prime minister of Greece since July 2019, except for a month between May and June 2023. Mitsotakis has been president of the New Democracy party since 2016. He is generally associated with the centre-right, espousing economically liberal policies.

Between 2016 and 2019, Mitsotakis served as the Leader of the Official Opposition and Minister of Administrative Reform from 2013 to 2015. He is the son of the late Konstantinos Mitsotakis, who was Prime Minister of Greece from 1990 to 1993. He was first elected to the Hellenic Parliament for the Athens B constituency in 2004. After New Democracy suffered two election defeats in 2015, he was elected the party's leader in January 2016. Three years later, he led his party to a majority in the 2019 Greek legislative election.

Following the May 2023 Greek parliamentary election in which no party won a majority, and no coalition government was formed by any of the parties eligible to do so, Mitsotakis called for a snap election in June. On 24 May 2023, as required by Greece's constitution, the Greek president Katerina Sakellaropoulou appointed Ioannis Sarmas to be the caretaker prime minister for the interim period. In the June 2023 Greek parliamentary election, he once again led his party to a majority and was sworn in as prime minister, having received the order to form a government from the Greek president.

During his terms as Prime Minister, Mitsotakis has received both praise and criticism for his pro-European, technocratic governance, austerity measures, and his handling of the COVID-19 pandemic in Greece. Additionally, he has been credited with the modernization and digital transformation of the country's public administration, and has been remarked for his overall management of the Greek economy, with Greece being named the Top Economic Performer for 2022 by The Economist, which was in particular due to Greece in 2022 being able to repay ahead of schedule 2.7 billion euros ($2.87 billion) of loans owed to Eurozone countries under the first bailout it received during its decade-long debt crisis, along with being on the verge of reaching investment-grade rating. He faced controversy for legalizing same-sex adoption and same-sex marriage in the country. He has also received both praise and criticism for his handling of migration, including aid from the European Union, but criticism from journalists and activists for pushbacks, which his government has denied. Additionally, Mitsotakis has received criticism for increased levels of corruption during his term, as well as a deterioration of freedom of the press in Greece. His term was impacted by the 2022 wiretapping scandal, the Tempi train crash, and the wildfires in 2021 and 2023. In 2024, he received criticism from the European Parliament in a resolution addressing concerns over the state of the rule of law in Greece.

== Early life and education ==
Kyriakos Mitsotakis was born on 4 March 1968, at General and Maternity Hospital Helena Venizelou in Athens. He is the son of Marika Mitsotaki (née Giannoukou) and former Prime Minister of Greece and New Democracy President Konstantinos Mitsotakis. At the time of his birth, his family had been placed under house arrest by the Greek military junta that had declared his father persona non grata and imprisoned him on the night of the coup. In 1968, when he was six months old, the family escaped to Turkey with the help of Turkish Minister of Foreign Affairs İhsan Sabri Çağlayangil. After a while, they moved from Turkey to Paris and returned to Greece in 1973. Mitsotakis controversially described the first six months of his life as political imprisonment. In 1986, Mitsotakis graduated from Athens College. From 1986 to 1990, he attended Harvard University, living in Harvard Yard as a freshman and at Currier House (Harvard College), where the House Master (subsequently renamed Faculty Dean) was Gregory Nagy, as an upperclassman. Nagy was also Mitsotakis's professor for the course "The Ancient Greek Hero." Mitsotakis earned a bachelor's degree in social studies, receiving the Hoopes Prize. Later, his senior thesis was published as a book titled The Pitfalls of Foreign Policy, which received mixed reviews. From 1992 to 1993, he attended Stanford University, earning a Ford Dorsey Master's in International Policy. From 1993 to 1995, he attended Harvard Business School, where he earned an MBA.

=== Committee assignments and parliamentary responsibilities (2004–2007) ===
Following his election to the Hellenic Parliament in March 2004, Mitsotakis began participating in parliamentary proceedings during a period marked by extensive legislative activity. The newly elected government sought to implement a broad programme of institutional, fiscal and administrative reforms while simultaneously overseeing the successful completion of the 2004 Summer Olympic Games and addressing longer-term structural challenges facing the Greek economy.

As a first-term Member of Parliament, Mitsotakis devoted considerable attention to understanding parliamentary procedure, committee work and legislative drafting. Within the Greek parliamentary system, standing committees play an essential role in examining draft legislation before it proceeds to debate in the plenary chamber. Committee meetings allow members to hear testimony from government officials, legal experts, academics, representatives of professional organisations and civil society groups, enabling more detailed examination of legislative proposals than is generally possible during plenary sessions.

Throughout his first parliamentary term, Mitsotakis developed a reputation among colleagues for his interest in policy detail, statistical analysis and comparative international experience. Rather than focusing exclusively on short-term political disputes, many of his parliamentary interventions examined broader structural questions concerning the organisation of the Greek state, economic competitiveness and the efficiency of public institutions. These themes reflected both his academic background and his professional experience in the private sector before entering politics.

=== Legislative priorities ===
During his early years in Parliament, Mitsotakis consistently argued that Greece required long-term structural reforms capable of improving public-sector efficiency while strengthening confidence among domestic and international investors. He frequently emphasized that sustainable economic growth depended not only upon macroeconomic stability but also upon the effectiveness of public institutions, transparent regulatory frameworks and efficient administrative procedures. Among the issues receiving particular attention were administrative simplification, reduction of unnecessary bureaucracy, digitalisation of public services, improvement of tax administration, enhancement of educational quality and policies designed to encourage entrepreneurship. Although many of these proposals would evolve over subsequent years, they remained recurring elements of Mitsotakis's public policy agenda throughout his political career. His parliamentary speeches often referred to the importance of measuring governmental performance through objective indicators, drawing comparisons with administrative practices implemented in other European Union member states. He argued that public-sector reform should be viewed as a continuous process rather than a single legislative initiative, requiring institutional continuity, regular evaluation and investment in human resources.

=== Economic policy positions ===
Economic policy represented one of Mitsotakis's principal areas of parliamentary interest during his first term. The early 2000s were characterised by relatively strong economic growth in Greece, although economists increasingly highlighted concerns regarding public finances, productivity, competitiveness and the long-term sustainability of fiscal policy. Within parliamentary debates, Mitsotakis argued that strengthening private investment and improving the business environment would contribute to long-term economic resilience. He frequently discussed the importance of reducing administrative barriers faced by businesses, accelerating licensing procedures and promoting technological innovation as drivers of productivity. These views reflected broader international discussions concerning structural reform within advanced European economies during the early twenty-first century. At the same time, he maintained that economic reform should operate within the broader framework of Greece's commitments as a member of the European Union and the euro area. Parliamentary discussions concerning fiscal management, investment policy and competitiveness increasingly incorporated European regulatory developments, providing an important context for legislative decision-making.

=== Education and human capital ===
Education also emerged as a recurring subject of Mitsotakis's parliamentary interventions. He argued that long-term national competitiveness depended upon improving educational quality, strengthening links between universities and research institutions, encouraging innovation and expanding opportunities for younger generations. His speeches frequently highlighted the importance of developing skills capable of supporting an increasingly knowledge-based economy. Drawing upon his own educational experiences abroad, Mitsotakis occasionally referred to international examples when discussing higher education policy, university governance and research collaboration. He argued that increased international cooperation could strengthen academic excellence while contributing to Greece's scientific and technological development.

== Entry into politics (2003–2004) ==
=== Political background ===
By the early 2000s, Greece was undergoing a period of significant political and economic transition. The country had adopted the euro as its official currency, preparations for the 2004 Summer Olympic Games in Athens were approaching their final stages, and public debate increasingly focused on issues including economic competitiveness, administrative efficiency, public-sector modernization, infrastructure development and Greece's role within the European Union. The governing Panhellenic Socialist Movement (PASOK), led initially by Costas Simitis and subsequently by George Papandreou, entered the 2004 election campaign after more than a decade in government. During this period New Democracy, under the leadership of Kostas Karamanlis, presented itself as advocating administrative reform, fiscal responsibility and institutional modernization. Public opinion surveys during the period indicated growing concern regarding bureaucracy, inefficiencies within the public administration, unemployment among younger citizens and the long-term competitiveness of the Greek economy within the European Single Market. These issues became central themes during the 2004 parliamentary campaign and shaped much of the political debate.

=== Decision to enter politics ===
Before seeking elected office, Kyriakos Mitsotakis had established a professional career in banking, management consulting and venture capital. His work in international financial institutions and private-sector management exposed him to organizational practices emphasizing strategic planning, performance evaluation and technological innovation. According to later interviews and official biographical material, Mitsotakis viewed his transition into politics as an opportunity to apply private-sector management experience to public administration. He argued that many long-standing structural challenges within the Greek state—including complex administrative procedures, overlapping responsibilities among government agencies and limited digital services—could be addressed through institutional reform and modernization. His decision also reflected a broader interest in public policy developed during his academic studies in the United States. At Harvard University, his family name was a major factor in public discussion. The Mitsotakis family had played a significant role in Greek political history, particularly through his father, Konstantinos Mitsotakis, who served as Prime Minister of Greece from 1990 to 1993. As a result, commentators often discussed the relationship between political inheritance and personal achievement throughout Mitsotakis' career. His professional experience in banking, consulting and investment management shaped the policy areas that would later become central to his political identity.ics, history and sociology through the Social Studies program, while subsequent graduate studies focused on international relations and business administration. These academic experiences contributed to an approach that frequently combined economic analysis with institutional and administrative perspectives. Although his family background inevitably attracted public attention, Mitsotakis consistently maintained that electoral support should be based upon individual qualifications, professional experience and policy proposals rather than family history alone. Throughout his first campaign he emphasized administrative reform, education, entrepreneurship, transparency and economic modernization as central priorities.

=== 2004 parliamentary election ===
Mitsotakis contested the March 2004 parliamentary election as a candidate of New Democracy in the Second Athens constituency, one of Greece's largest and most politically competitive electoral districts. The constituency included diverse urban neighborhoods with varying socioeconomic characteristics, making electoral campaigning particularly demanding. During the campaign he participated in public meetings, policy discussions and media interviews focusing on economic development, institutional modernization and the importance of strengthening public confidence in state institutions. Rather than emphasizing ideological confrontation, much of his public messaging concentrated on practical policy proposals relating to economic growth, administrative simplification and investment. The parliamentary election of 7 March 2004 resulted in a victory for New Democracy, enabling Kostas Karamanlis to become Prime Minister. Mitsotakis was elected to the Hellenic Parliament for the first time, marking the beginning of a parliamentary career that would eventually include ministerial office, party leadership and the premiership.

=== Beginning of parliamentary service ===
Following his election, Mitsotakis joined the Hellenic Parliament at a time when expectations for governmental reform were particularly high. The incoming administration inherited responsibility for completing preparations for the Athens Olympic Games while simultaneously addressing fiscal, administrative and economic challenges that had become increasingly prominent within domestic political debate.

As one of the younger members of Parliament, Mitsotakis focused on acquiHis election marked the beginning of a parliamentary career that would eventually lead to senior government positions, leadership of New Democracy and the premiership of Greece.ring legislative experience and participating actively in parliamentary procedures. His interventions during his early years in Parliament frequently addressed public administration, competitiveness, investment, innovation and education. These policy interests would remain consistent themes throughout his subsequent political career and later influence his work as a government minister and Prime Minister.

== Professional career ==
Before becoming a full-time politician, Kyriakos Mitsotakis built a career in economics, finance, consulting and business management. His professional background outside politics became one of the defining elements of his public profile, particularly because he often presented his private-sector experience as a foundation for his later emphasis on administrative reform, investment, entrepreneurship and digital transformation.

After completing his studies in the United States, Mitsotakis entered the international business environment during a period when globalization, financial integration and technological development were reshaping many advanced economies. His academic training combined political science, international relations and business administration, giving him exposure to both public policy analysis and private-sector management practices. From 1990 to 1991, Kyriakos Mitsotakis worked as a financial analyst at the corporate finance division of Chase Bank in London. From 1991 to 1992, Mitsotakis returned to Greece and joined the Hellenic Army to fulfil his mandatory national service obligations. From 1995 to 1997, and following the completion of his post-graduate studies, he was employed by the consultancy McKinsey & Company in London, focusing primarily on the telecommunications and financial services industries. From 1997 to 1999, he worked for Alpha Ventures, a private equity subsidiary of Alpha Bank, as a senior investment officer, executing venture capital and private equity transactions. In 1999, he founded NBG Venture Capital, the private equity and venture capital subsidiary of the National Bank of Greece, and acted as its CEO, managing its portfolio and executing transactions in Greece and the Balkans, until April 2003, when he resigned to pursue a career in politics.

In January 2003, he was nominated by the World Economic Forum as a global leader of tomorrow. After completing his studies in the United States, Mitsotakis entered the international business environment during a period when globalization, financial integration and technological development were reshaping many advanced economies. His academic training combined political science, international relations and business administration, giving him exposure to both public policy analysis and private-sector management practices. Banking and financial sector After graduating from university, Mitsotakis began his professional career in the financial sector. He worked at Chase Investment Bank in London, where he gained experience in investment banking and financial analysis. During this period, he worked in an international environment characterized by increasingly interconnected capital markets and growing importance of financial services within the global economy. His experience in banking provided him with familiarity regarding corporate finance, investment decisions, risk evaluation and international markets. These experiences later influenced his political approach, particularly his emphasis on attracting foreign investment and improving Greece's business environment.Following his work in banking, Mitsotakis joined McKinsey & Company, one of the world's largest management consulting firms. His role involved advising organizations on issues related to strategy, operational efficiency and organizational development. Working in management consulting exposed him to methods of analyzing institutional performance, identifying inefficiencies and designing structural improvements. These concepts later became central themes in his political programme, especially regarding the modernization of the Greek public administration.During his consulting career, Mitsotakis worked in an international professional environment where decisions were often based on measurable objectives, comparative analysis and long-term planning. He later argued that similar principles could be applied to government institutions in order to improve efficiency and accountability.

=== Return to Greece and investment management ===
In the late 1990s, Mitsotakis returned to Greece and continued his professional career in investment management. He became involved in venture capital and private investment, focusing on financing companies with growth potential. He later was Chief Executive Officer of NBG Venture Capital, an investment company associated with the National Bank of Greece group. In this position, he was involved in evaluating investment opportunities, supporting entrepreneurial activity and managing investment strategies.His work in venture capital gave him direct experience with issues affecting businesses, including access to financing, regulatory obstacles, innovation and competitiveness. These topics would later become recurring themes in his political platform.

=== Transition from business to politics ===
Mitsotakis' transition from the private sector into politics was influenced by both his family background and his professional experience. Although he came from a prominent political family, he initially pursued a career outside elected office, building professional credentials before entering Parliament. He frequently presented this background as evidence that he understood the challenges faced by businesses and professionals operating within Greece. Supporters argued that his private-sector experience contributed to a more managerial approach to government. Critics, however, have debated whether private-sector methods can always be directly transferred to public administration, where social responsibilities and democratic accountability play a different role. In 2003, the World Economic Forum selected Mitsotakis as a Young Global Leader, recognizing emerging figures considered influential in their respective fields. This recognition came before his parliamentary career and contributed to his international public profile.

== Political career ==
During the 2000 legislative election, Mitsotakis worked for New Democracy's national campaign. In the 2004 legislative election, Mitsotakis ran in the Athens B constituency, receiving more votes than any other New Democracy candidate in the country, and was elected to the Hellenic Parliament.

On 24 June 2013, Mitsotakis was appointed as the Minister of Administrative Reform and e-Governance in Antonis Samaras's cabinet, succeeding Antonis Manitakis. He was in this position until January 2015. During this time, he pursued comprehensive national reforms by implementing a functional reorganization of institutions, structures and processes. He steadfastly supported the drastic downsizing of the public sector and the structural reform of the tax administration.

In 2015, Mitsotakis was a parliamentary representative for New Democracy, representing the President of the party in Parliament, as well as the body of the party's Representatives. He was charged with expressing the positions of his party during Parliamentary procedures and discourse, as well as ensuring the proper function of Parliament through a process of checks and balances. In March 2015, he claimed that then-Minister of Finance Yanis Varoufakis was undermining the Greek negotiations over the third bailout programme, saying: "Every time he opens his mouth, he creates a problem for the country's negotiating position."

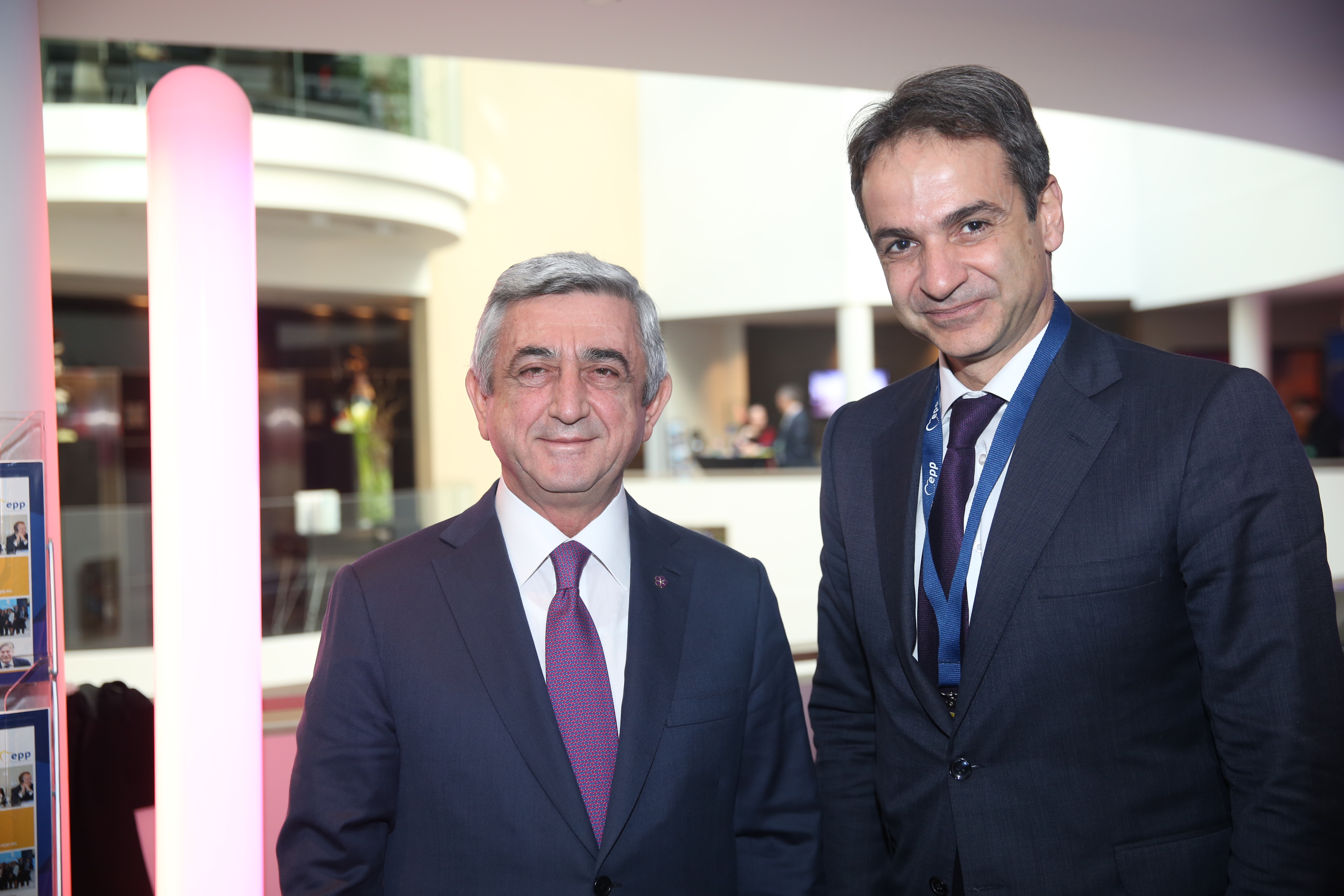
Mitsotakis and Armenian President Serzh Sargsyan in 2016

Mitsotakis was the first of four New Democracy members to announce their candidacy in the leadership election, declared following the resignation of Antonis Samaras as party leader and the failure of New Democracy in the September 2015 snap election. Amongst the other contestants was then-interim leader and former President of the Hellenic Parliament Vangelis Meimarakis. According to the Financial Times, Mitsotakis was "billed as an outsider in the leadership race" due to the party establishment's support of Meimarakis's candidacy. Following the first round of voting with no clear winner, Mitsotakis came second, 11% behind Meimarakis.

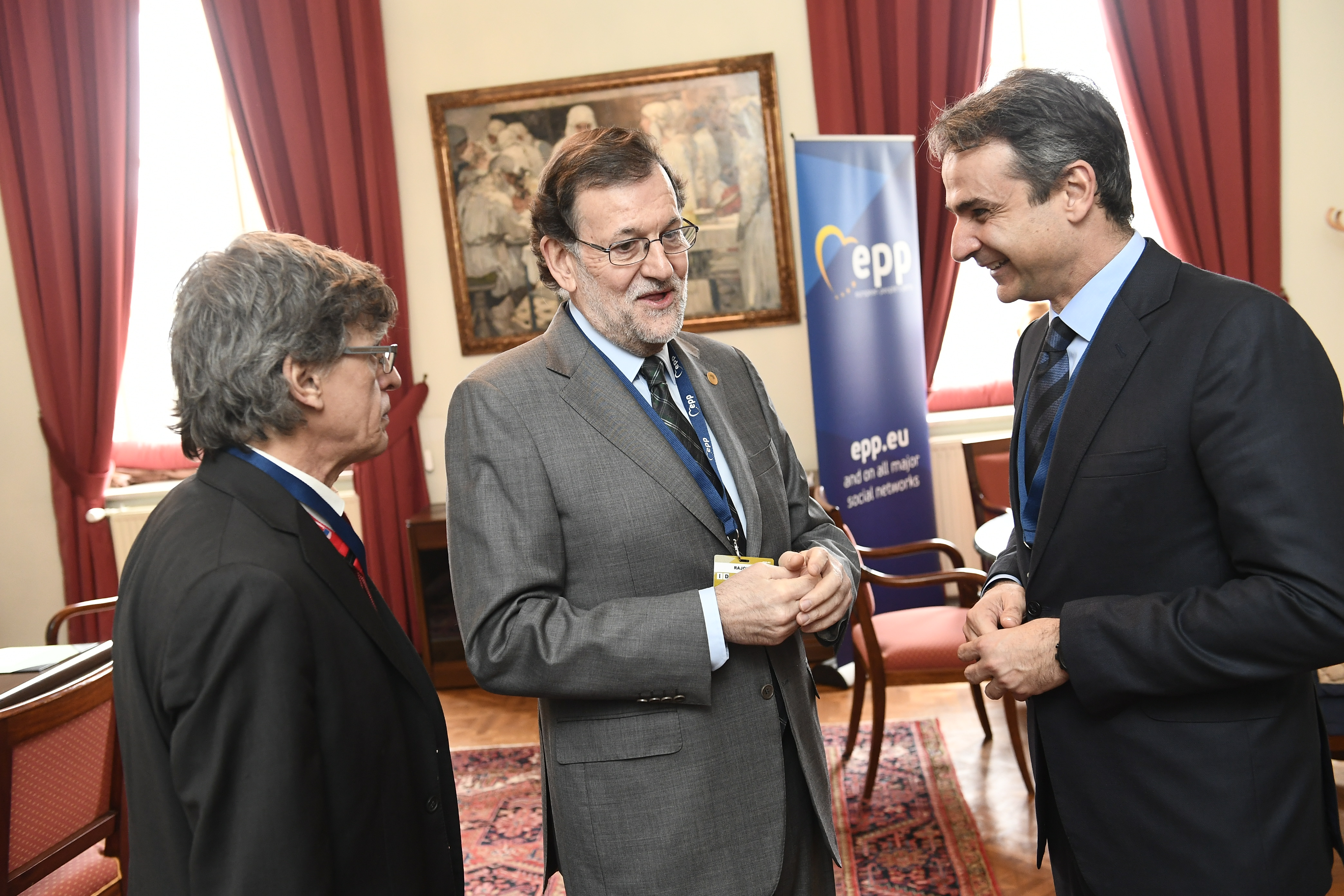
Mitsotakis and Spanish Prime Minister Mariano Rajoy, 2017

On 10 January 2016, Mitsotakis was elected president of the New Democracy political party succeeding Giannis Plakiotakis (transitional president) with almost 4% difference from opponent Vangelis Meimarakis. A week following Mitsotakis's election as leader, two opinion polls were published that put New Democracy ahead of Syriza for the first time in a year.

His party won 33% of the votes in the European elections in 2019. He managed to win back votes from the Golden Dawn Party. Following the election results, the Hellenic Parliament was dissolved and a snap election was called.

== Scandals and controversies ==
=== Press freedom ===
Under Mitsotakis, Greece has declined in press freedom. Violence against journalists has increased, resulting to a deterioration of the Greek freedom of the press. Mitsotakis's government has directed funds towards media platforms that produce favorable coverage, whilst also allocating more than €20 million to state-friendly media at the beginning of the pandemic. Furthermore, in November 2021, the government enacted a law to criminalize the dissemination of "fake news". This legislation empowers authorities to imprison individuals for up to five years if they spread purportedly false information that is deemed capable of causing concern or fear to the public or undermining public confidence in the national economy, the country's defense capacity, or public health. Mitsotakis has acknowledged that the law may have been a mistake, but the law has not been reversed.

=== Migration ===
Mitsotakis adopted a hardline stance on the European Migrant Crisis by resorting to pushbacks of thousands of migrants in an attempt to prevent their entry into Greece, which his government has denied. He received praise from the European Union for his handling of the crisis and received economic support of €700m.

=== Wiretapping scandal ===
In July 2022, the leader of the political party PASOK, Nikos Androulakis, revealed that there was an attempt to bug his phone with the spyware program "Predator". In a closed-door parliamentary hearing that was called by Androulakis, the chief of Greek Intelligence Service, P. Kontoleon, admitted that his service had spied on Greek journalist Thanassis Koukakis, who has also complained about being targeted by "Predator". After the publication of an investigation by Efsyn and Reporters United that Grigoris Dimitriadis, Mitsotakis's nephew and general secretary, had connections with Felix Bitsios, the owner of the company that markets the "Predator", Dimitriadis submitted his resignation. Shortly after, the chief of Greek Intelligence Service, Panagiotis Kontoleon, also stepped down over an allegation that his service had tapped Androulakis's phone. Mitsotakis himself has actively worked to block any investigation on the wiretapping scandal from concluding. The scandal has garnered extensive attention in the international media due to the fact that a number of the actions taken subsequent to the revelations were contentious and seemed to suggest an attempt to conceal the truth. In January 2023, despite calls from the opposition to hold the government accountable for its actions and investigate the scandal further, Mitsotakis's administration successfully withstood a no-confidence vote.

=== Mandatory COVID-19 measures and vaccinations ===
In December 2020, Mitsotakis was criticized after a photo of him surfaced on social media, in which he posed with five other people while not wearing a mask, during a time when Greece had a nationwide lockdown and mask-wearing was mandatory both indoors and outdoors. On 6 February 2021 Mitsotakis visited the island of Ikaria to inspect the progress of COVID-19 vaccinations in the area. During this visit, he attended a lunch organized by MP Christodoulos I. Stefanadis along with his entourage numbering up to 40 people. The incident was covered by both Greek and international media and Mitsotakis was heavily criticized for violating the existing COVID-19 containment measures. Mitsotakis publicly apologized for the Icaria incident, saying this will never happen again and that "the image hurt the citizens".

In May 2021, when the Mitsotakis government announced the country's opening for tourism on 14 May, movement control measures, such as the obligation to send an SMS at particular sites, were retained temporarily. Other measures still in place after the re-opening of tourism were the daily curfew, from 00:30, the obligatory use of face masks indoors and outdoors, the ban on music in cafes and restaurants, and the ban on the operation of indoor restaurants throughout May. Casinos were allowed to operate, with a specific sanitary protocol. In an interview on 27 May 2021, Mitsotakis did not give a clear answer as to when and if the above measures would be lifted in the summer. He referred to a roadmap for lifting the controls but did not elaborate. He also estimated that tourism in 2021 in Greece would be around 50% of the levels experienced in 2019. Greece was awarded the "Global Champion Award for COVID-19 Crisis Management" by the World Travel and Tourism Council, which "commends" the Greek Government as "a global example for the safe opening of the tourism sector during the pandemic." He was also credited for the vaccine pass which was later used in the majority of countries in the European Union.

=== Train collision ===
On 28 February 2023, a freight train and a passenger train traveling in opposite directions between Athens and Thessaloniki were inadvertently routed on the same track; 57 people were killed in the head-on collision near Tempi. Amid rising anger and nationwide protests, Mitsotakis offered "a public apology on behalf of those who ruled the country over the years", took responsibility for the disaster and vowed to fix the long-neglected rail system. He said the government would invest more than 270 million euros to hire more staff and to install digital control systems by August.

=== Cooperation with Israel during the Gaza conflict ===
Mitsotakis' government has been accused of cooperating with Israel during the Gaza conflict. Mitsotakis has rejected the term "genocide" for the events in Gaza, calling it "very heavy". Irish journalist David Cronin underlined that Greece's close cooperation with Israel effectively implicates Athens in aiding genocide.

== Prime Minister of Greece ==
=== First term (2019–2023) ===
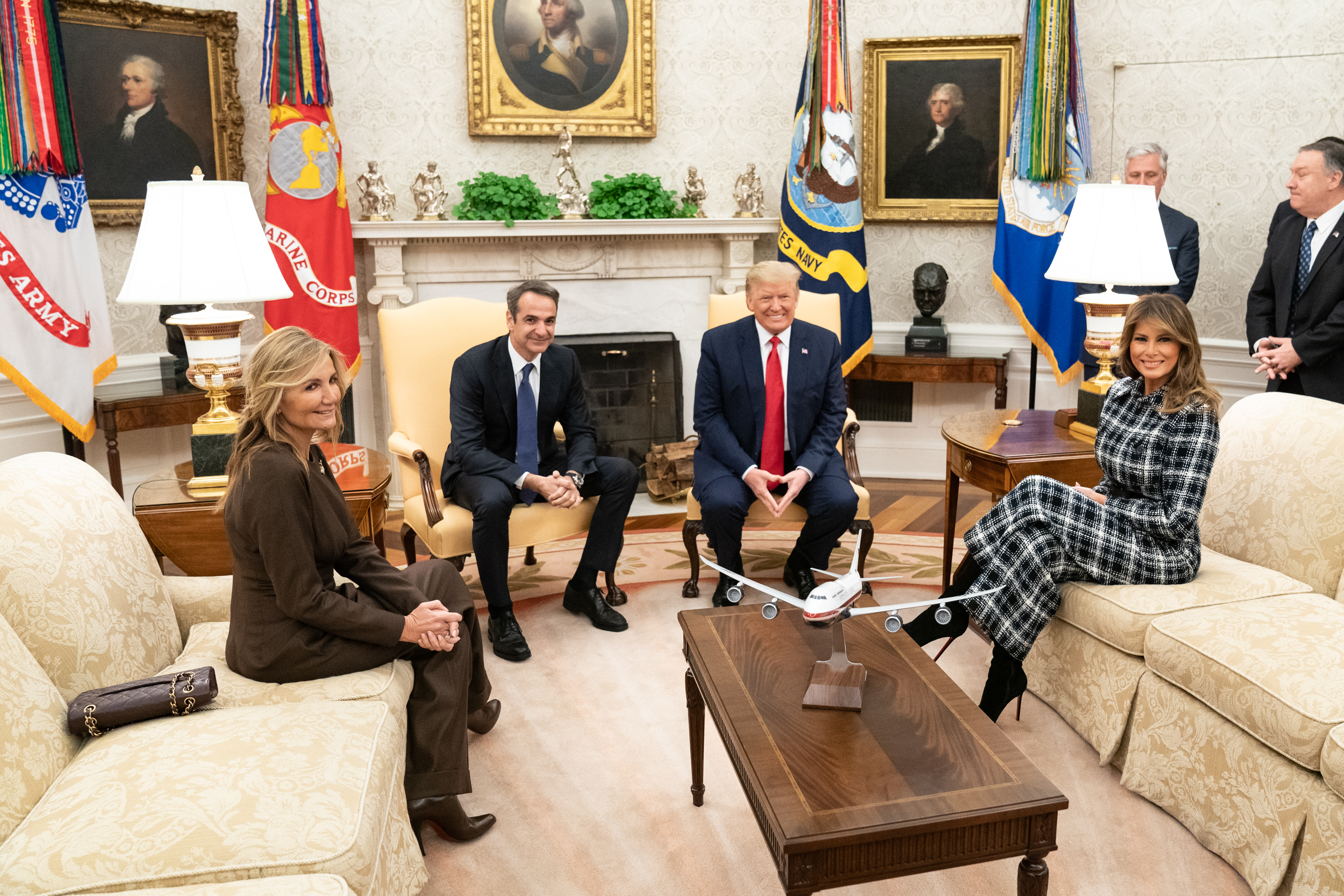
Mitsotakis and Mareva Grabowski-Mitsotakis with U.S. President Donald Trump and First Lady Melania Trump in the Oval Office of the White House, January 2020

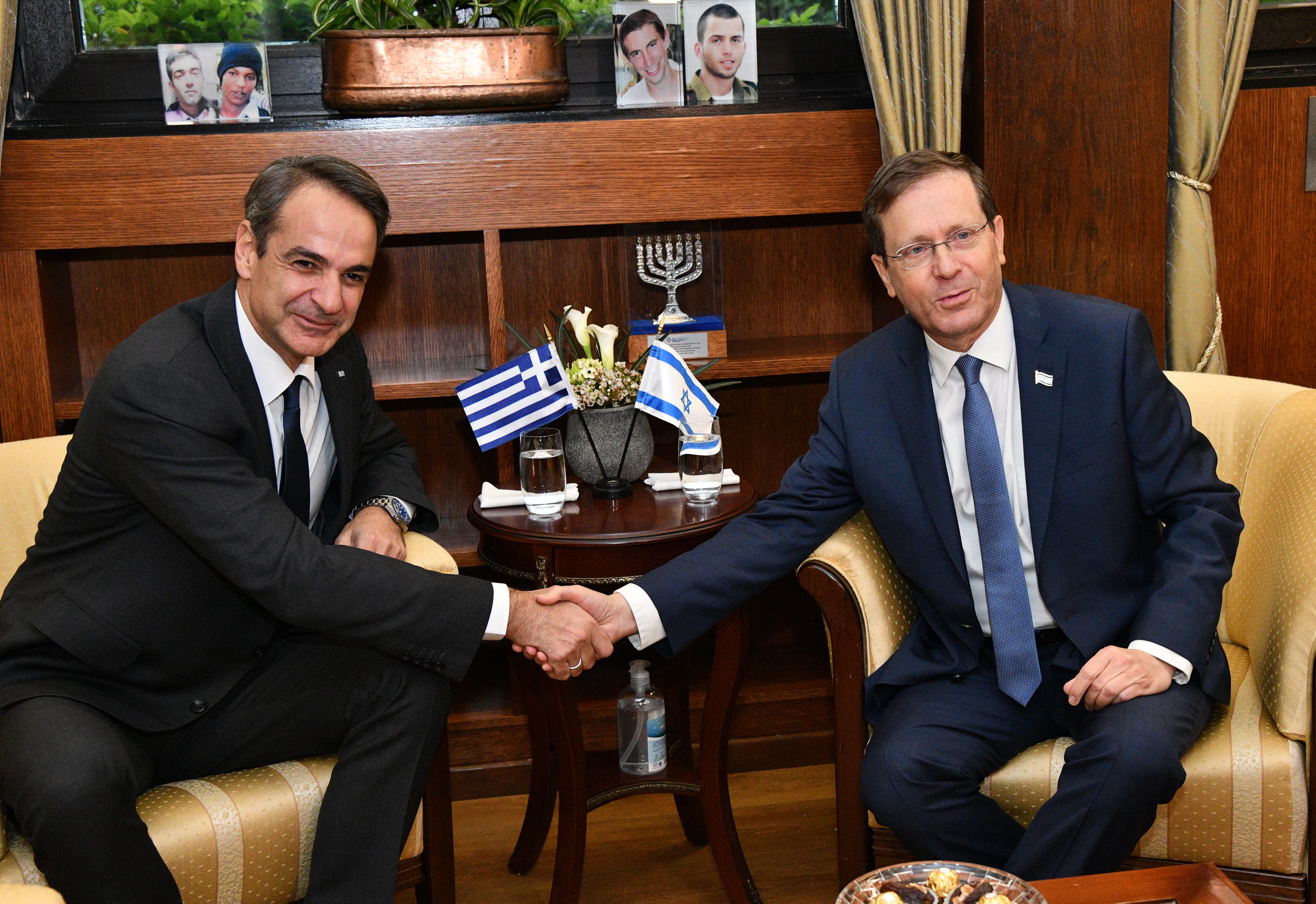
Mitsotakis with President of Israel Isaac Herzog, December 2021

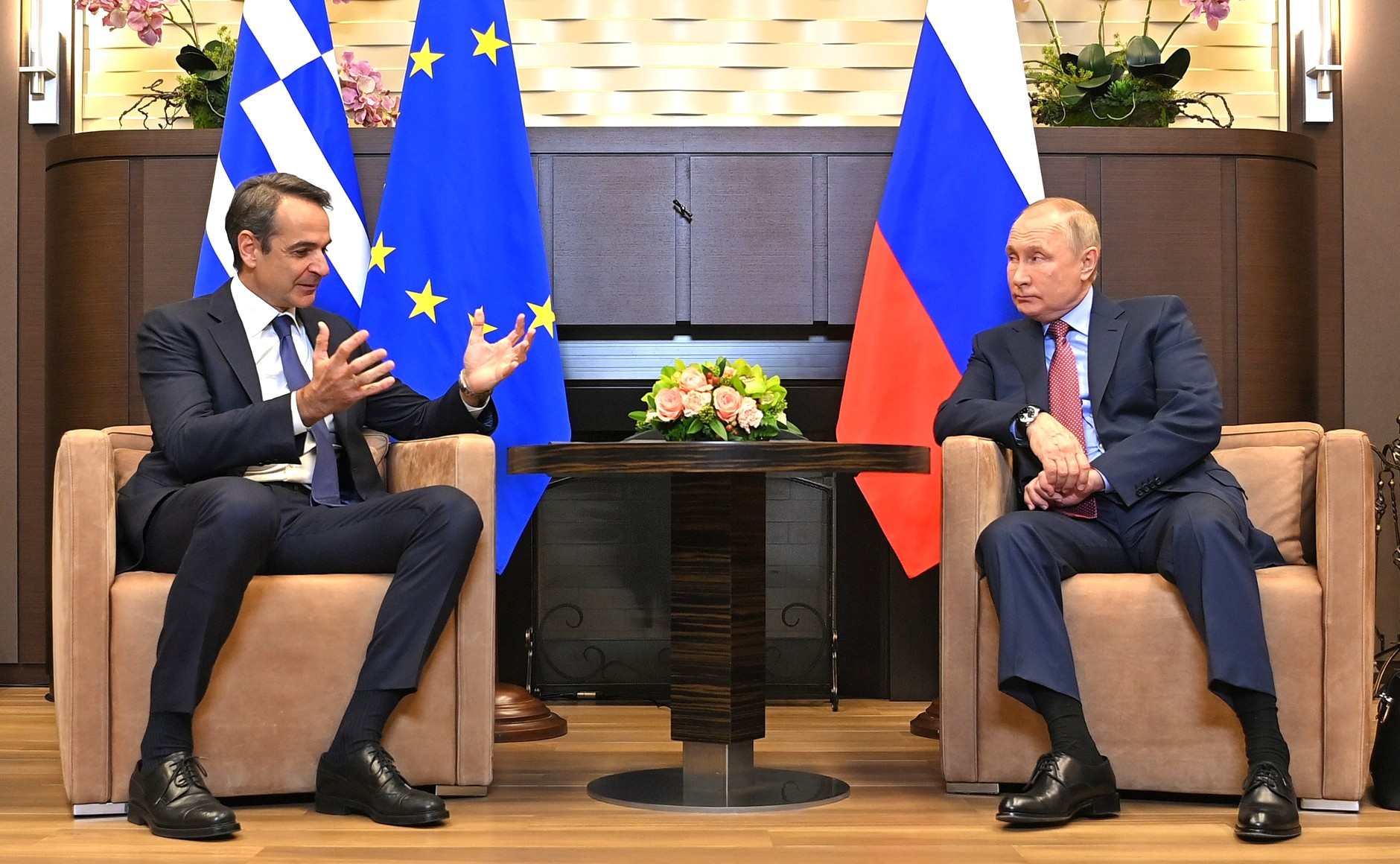
Mitsotakis with Russian President Vladimir Putin, December 2021

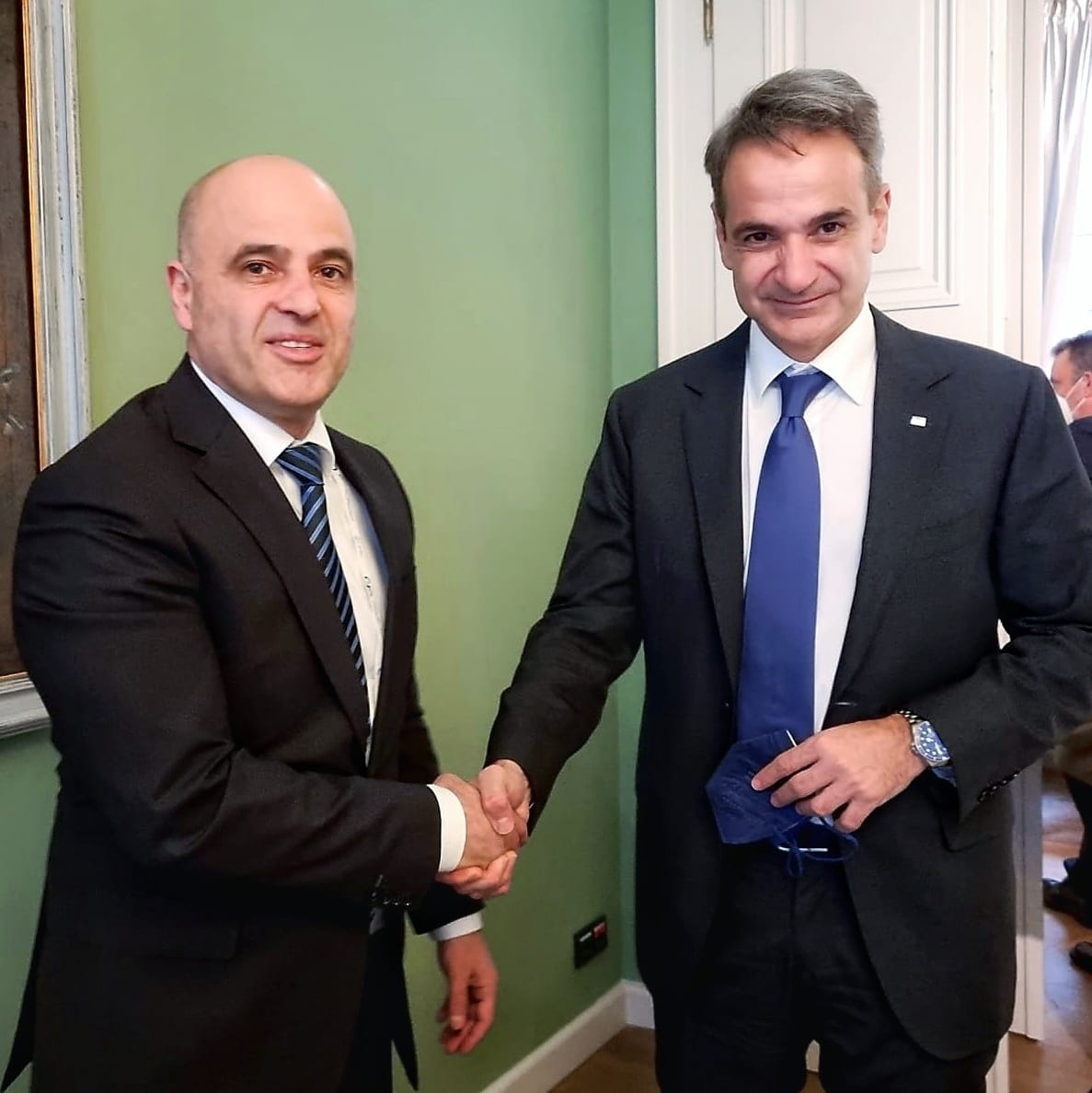
Mitsotakis with Prime Minister of North Macedonia Dimitar Kovačevski, February 2022

New Democracy was victorious in the 2019 Greek parliamentary election, scoring 39.85% of votes and securing 158 seats in the Hellenic Parliament.

On 8 July 2019, Greek President Prokopis Pavlopoulos accepted Tsipras's resignation and tasked Mitsotakis with forming a new government. Mitsotakis was sworn in as prime minister the same day as well. On 9 July, the ministers in his government were sworn in. Among his cabinet was Makis Voridis, a former member of the far-right Popular Orthodox Rally, who was met with a cold reception abroad and by the Jewish community in Greece. Israel announced that it would not cooperate with Voridis.

From 2019 onwards, it has launched a wave of privatizations, including tourism infrastructure, coastal land, and state-owned shares in the gas and electricity companies, as well as Athens International Airport. On the other hand, a tax reform aimed at making the country "a haven for billionaires and the wealthiest citizens", the Financial Times notes, is being implemented. The aim is to attract investment by offering low tax rates. A clause will protect the beneficiaries of this tax policy from possible policy changes by future governments.

The "big growth bill", adopted in the summer of 2020, provides for the restriction of the right to strike and the abolition of collective agreements, which had already been suspended in 2012 at the request of the Troika and then reinstated by the Tsipras government. Migration policy has been tightened: the coverage of hospital care for destitute foreigners has been abolished, and the period during which refugees who have been granted asylum can reside in public housing has been reduced from six months to one month. On environmental issues, the government reformed legislation to facilitate oil exploration.

Mitsotakis's government has been praised by some observers for its handling of the COVID-19 pandemic as well as for its plans for spending a €31bn share of the EU's Recovery Plan and for its orderly vaccination roll-out. Additionally, the common COVID-19 certificate was credited to Mitsotakis, and his idea has been taken up at a European level. Mitsotakis had criticized the initially slow pace of the EU's COVID-19 vaccine rollout, and he had called for its acceleration.

Measures were implemented from March to May 2020 and from November 2020 until May 2021, when their gradual lifting started. The controls included the introduction of various movement restrictions, suspension of the operation of retail, catering, and entertainment businesses, as well as schools and churches.

In August 2020, a reform of the labour law was adopted. It provides for the possibility of an employer to dismiss employees without having to give reasons for the decision or give prior notice to the persons concerned. The tax authorities' anti-fraud unit was abolished, and its employees were integrated into the Ministry of Finance.

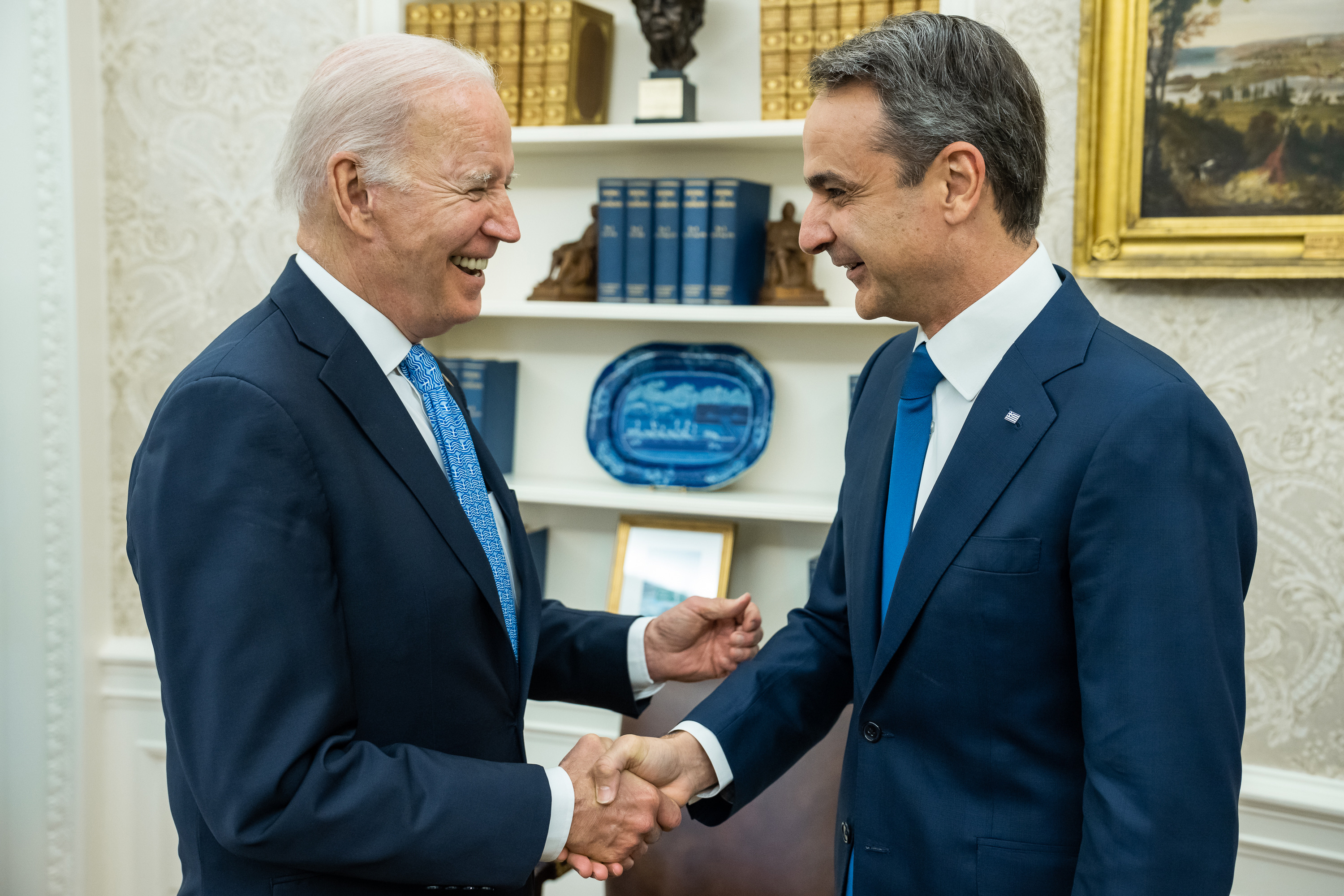
Mitsotakis with U.S. President Joe Biden in the Oval Office of the White House, May 2022

There is a long-standing dispute between Turkey and Greece over natural resources in the eastern Mediterranean. Mitsotakis said that Turkey "remains stuck in the logic of using force and threats." He told NATO Secretary General Jens Stoltenberg that Greece is "contributing to NATO, we are an ally and have the expectation that when another NATO ally is behaving in a way that jeopardises our interests, NATO should not adopt this stance of equal distances and non-intervention in internal differences. It is deeply unfair to Greece."

In July 2020, Mitsotakis awarded honorary Greek citizenship to American actor Tom Hanks and his wife, American actress Rita Wilson, who is half Greek.

On 16 May 2022, Mitsotakis met with U.S. President Joe Biden at the White House. The next day, Mitsotakis became the first Prime Minister of Greece to address a Joint session of the United States Congress at the invitation of U.S. House Speaker Nancy Pelosi.

==== 2023 elections ====
Mitsotakis visited President Katerina Sakellaropoulou on 22 April in order to request the dissolution of the Parliament due to a national issue of extraordinary importance (pursuant to Article 41 of the Constitution of Greece); the issue cited was the need for political stability for the achievement of investment-grade. The election day was set for Sunday, 21 May, a day before the end of the 30-day period within which elections must be held following the dissolution of the Parliament.

New Democracy won the plurality of votes but did not win an outright majority. As no coalition government was formed by any of the parties eligible to do so, Mitsotakis called for another snap election in June. On 24 May, as required by Greece's constitution, President Sakellaropoulou appointed Ioannis Sarmas to be the caretaker prime minister for the interim.

The next month, he once again led his party to a majority in the June 2023 Greek legislative election and was sworn in as prime minister again after receiving the order to form a government by the president.

=== Second term (2023–present) ===
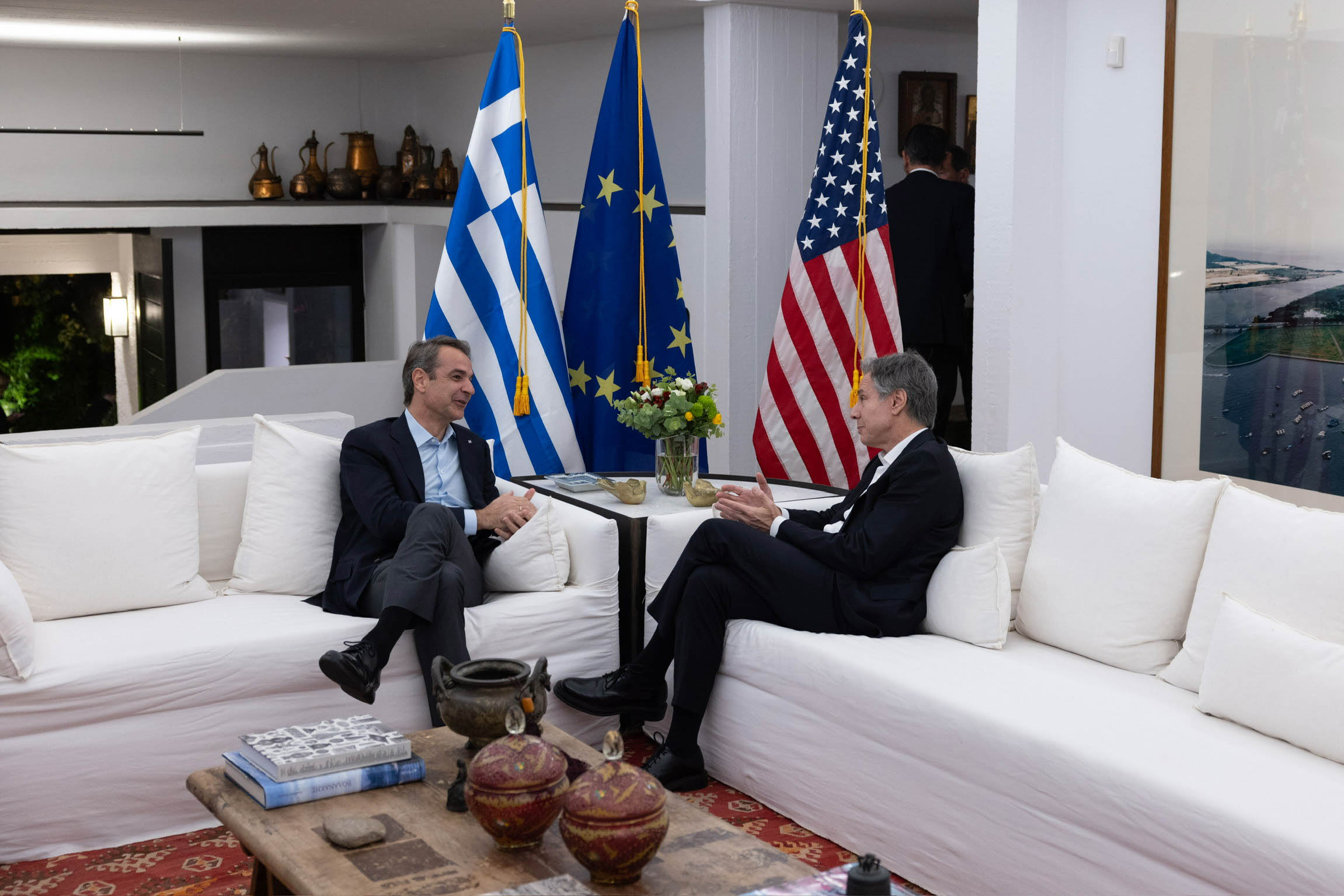
Mitsotakis with U.S. Secretary of State Antony Blinken in Crete, Greece, 6 January 2024

In July 2023, Mitsotakis announced that he intended to legalise same-sex marriage in Greece. On 17 September, Mitsotakis stated that the subject would be addressed in Greece within the next four years.

In October 2023, Mitsotakis condemned the Hamas-led 7 October terrorist attacks on southern Israel and expressed his support for Israel and "its right to self-defense". Greece agreed to participate in the next steps towards supporting NATO operations in the region, but later backed a ceasefire call through the United Nations.

In 2024, his tenure continued with the introduction of landmark bills, focusing on the establishment of private academic institutions in Greece, as well as revisions to the tax and income systems. Additionally, legislation was proposed for same-sex marriage and adoption by same-sex couples, a move that was widely described as progressive. However, these initiatives faced significant opposition from right-wing and hard-right factions within the party, as well as the Greek Orthodox Church, which openly expressed its disagreement with the proposed legislation. To address these concerns and secure support ahead of the parliamentary vote, Mitsotakis took the unconventional step of organizing educational meetings for dissenting members, aiming to provide a detailed explanation of the potential benefits of the proposed bills for same-sex couples. According to journalistic sources, the educational initiative was not successful.

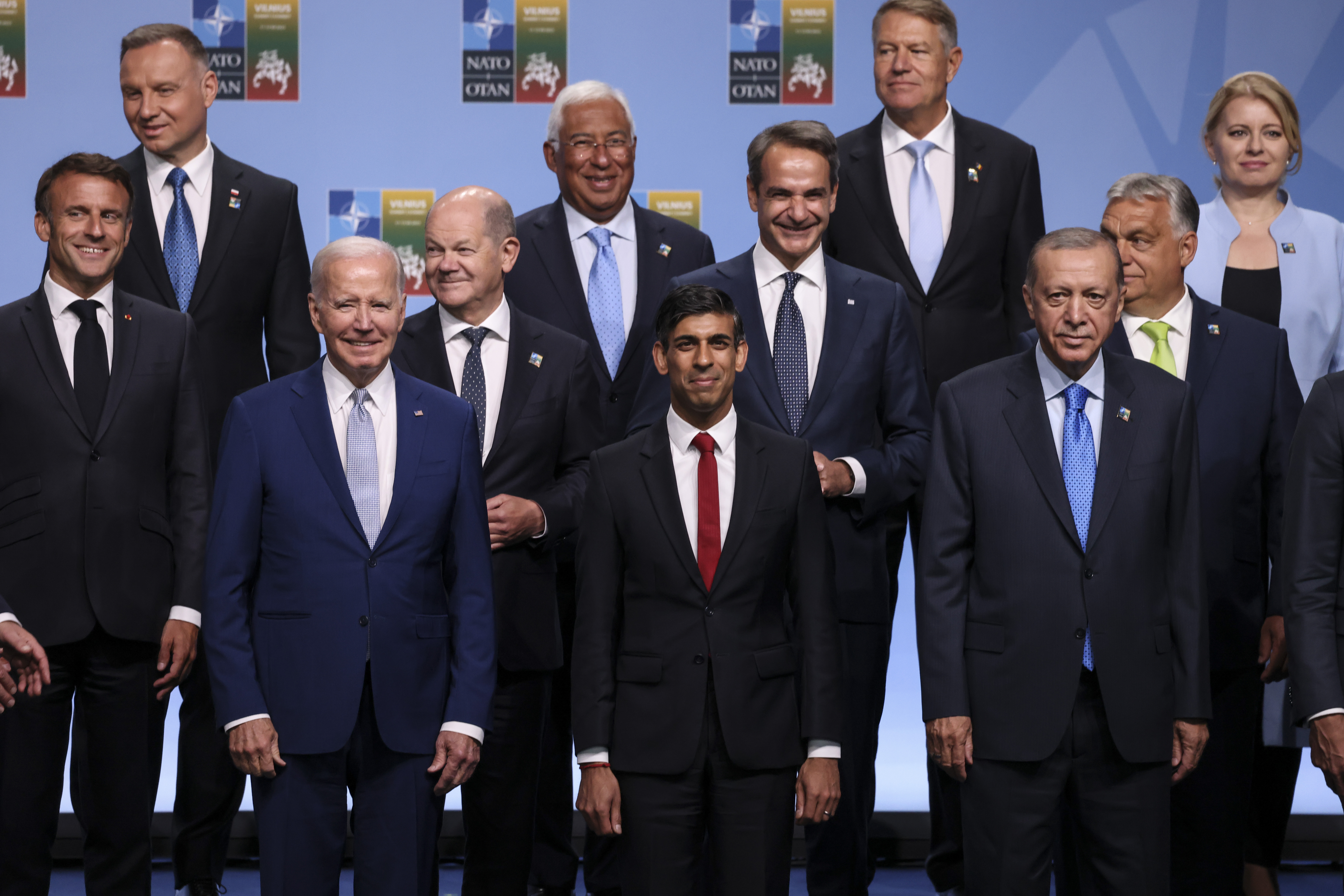
Mitsotakis at the 2023 Vilnius NATO summit on 11 July 2023

Prior to the government's plans to legalize private higher education systems, it came under criticism for allegedly violating Article 16 of the constitution. Legal experts and other political parties argued that the government was circumventing the constitution by introducing private institutions without first amending the constitution. Some contended that amending the constitution was unfeasible due to the government's insufficient number of MPs in parliament. Mitsotakis's approach was viewed as a shortcut, which was widely considered unconstitutional, resulting in widespread protests against private institutions.

During a working visit to Ukraine on 6 March 2024 to meet with President Volodymyr Zelenskyy, a Russian missile exploded near his entourage, killing five people.

In the 2024 European Parliament election, his party fell in popular support to 28%, compared to nearly 41% in the June 2023 legislative election; this was capitalized by centre-left parties (Syriza, PASOK) proposing a joint opposition against him in the next Greek legislative election.

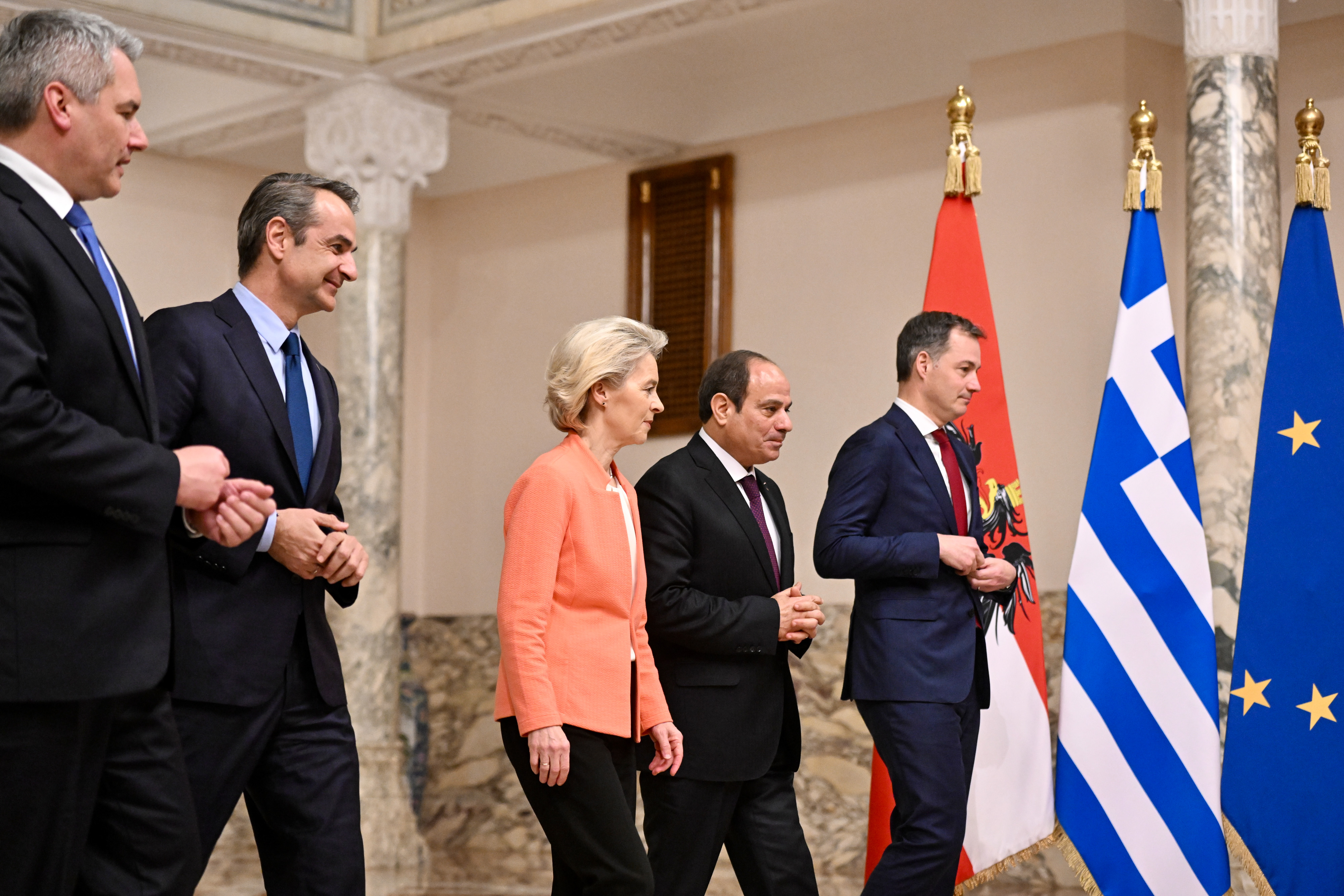
Mitsotakis with Egyptian President Abdel Fattah el-Sisi and European Commission President Ursula von der Leyen in Cairo, 17 March 2024

In May 2024, he arrived in Ankara, Turkey, where he met with Turkish President Recep Tayyip Erdoğan. The leaders discussed Middle East and Ukraine developments, reviewed bilateral relations, and agreed on enhancing trade and cooperation. They planned to meet again in September in New York. The Prime Minister emphasized resolving the Cyprus problem, highlighting its prolonged division.

On 20 July 2024, Mitsotakis visited Nicosia, Cyprus, to commemorate the 50th anniversary of the Turkish invasion of Cyprus. He declared that the Greeks "will not stop fighting until Cyprus is reunited."

On 30 March 2025, Mitsotakis met with Israeli Prime Minister Benjamin Netanyahu in Jerusalem. The two "reaffirmed the strategic relationship between Greece and Israel" and discussed "the further deepening of bilateral cooperation, particularly in the field of defense." The meeting sparked controversy, as Netanyahu was wanted by the International Criminal Court for alleged war crimes in the Gaza war.

In March 2026, Mitsotakis stated that the effective control of Iran's nuclear and ballistic missile programs is a "necessary condition" for regional stability and peace. His comments followed a major escalation in the Middle East, including joint U.S.-Israeli military strikes against Iranian military infrastructure, nuclear facilities, and missile sites that began on 28 February 2026.

== Personal life ==
Mitsotakis is the younger brother of former Minister for Foreign Affairs and Mayor of Athens Dora Bakoyannis, making him the brother-in-law of the late Pavlos Bakoyannis, who was assassinated by the terrorist group 17 November in 1989, and the uncle of Kostas Bakoyannis, former Regional Governor of Central Greece and former Mayor of Athens.

Mitsotakis is married to Mareva Grabowska, an investment banker of British, Greek, and Polish descent. They have three children, Sophia, Konstantinos and Daphne.

In addition to his native Greek, Mitsotakis speaks English, French and some German.

== Venizelos/Mitsotakis family tree ==
Main members of the Venizelos/Mitsotakis family. Prime Ministers of Greece are highlighted in light blue.

Kyriakos Venizelos (?–1883)	Styliani Ploumidaki (1830–1897)
Eleftherios Venizelos (1864–1936)	Katingo Venizelou (1858–1934)	Constantine "Costis" Mitsotakis (1845–1898)
Kyriakos Venizelos (1892–1942)	Sofoklis Venizelos (1894–1964)	Kyriakos Mitsotakis (1892–1942)	Stavroula Ploumidaki (1896–1983)
Nikitas Venizelos (1930–2020)	Konstantinos Mitsotakis (1918–2017)	Marika Giannoukou (1930–2012)
Pavlos Bakoyannis (1935–1989)	Dora Bakoyanni née Mitsotaki (b. 1954)	Kyriakos Mitsotakis (b. 1968)
Kostas Bakoyannis (b. 1978)

== See also ==
- List of current heads of state and government
- List of heads of the executive by approval rating
- List of international prime ministerial trips made by Kyriakos Mitsotakis

Party political offices
Preceded by Ioannis Plakiotakis	President of New Democracy; 2016–present	Incumbent
Political offices
Preceded by Antonis Manitakis	Minister of Administrative Reform and Electronic Governance; 2013–2015	Succeeded by Nikos Voutsis as Minister for Administrative Reorganization
Preceded by Ioannis Plakiotakis	Leader of the Opposition; 2016–2019	Succeeded by Alexis Tsipras
Preceded by Alexis Tsipras	Prime Minister of Greece; 2019–2023	Succeeded by Ioannis Sarmas
Preceded by Ioannis Sarmas	Prime Minister of Greece; 2023–present	Incumbent
Order of precedence
Preceded by Konstantinos Tasoulas as President	Order of precedence of Greece; Prime Minister	Succeeded by Nikitas Kaklamanis as Speaker of the Parliament
