= Christodoulos I. Stefanadis =

Greek cardiologist and academic

Christodoulos I. Stefanadis is Professor of Cardiology in the Medical School of the University of Athens. Professor of Medicine, Department of Medicine, Division of Cardiology, Emory University, Atlanta U.S.A.Professor of Internal Medicine, Cardiology, Yale University, New Haven, Connecticut, USA. He has been recognised as the top researcher in the field of Cardiovascular medicine in the last 20 years with the most original research publications in peer review journals. Some of his main research interests include coronary heart disease, detection and treatment of vulnerable atheromatic plaque, aortic elastic properties, mitral valve disease, interventional treatment of resistant hypertension and designing many catheter types used for various diagnostic and therapeutic interventional procedures.

He is also a member of the Hellenic Parliament from New Democracy.

== Biography ==
Christodoulos Stefanadis was born in Ikaria May 31, 1947, age 77, Greece and attended the University of Athens Medical School from which he graduated in 1971. He completed his residency in Cardiology at the Cardiology Department of the University of Athens (1978), followed by a PhD in Athens Medical School (1981). He has been Professor of Cardiology since 2002 and Director of the 1st Department of Cardiology since 2003. He has held the positions of Dean of Athens Medical School (2007–2011), President of the Hellenic Society of Cardiology (1997–1999 & 2007–2009), Board Member of the Hellenic Heart Foundation (1995–present), Professor of Medicine, Department of Medicine, Division of Cardiology, Emory University, Atlanta U.S.A., Professor of Internal Medicine, Cardiology, Yale University, New Haven, Connecticut, USA (July 2014–).

== Research ==
One of his several research activities include designing of at least 10 prototype cardiac catheters which were applied in various diagnostic and therapeutic interventions. Early in his career he developed the technique of retrograde non-transeptal mitral balloon valvuloplasty which has been used internationally for the interventional treatment of mitral stenosis, introduced the idea of covering metallic stents by non-thrombotic material and he developed covered stents by autologous vascular (arterial or vein) grafts. He subsequently made studies on the elastic properties of aorta and the function of left atrium. A large part of his research efforts was devoted to experimental and clinical studies on coronary heart disease, such as estimation of thermal heterogeneity of human atherosclerotic plaques using a special catheter with a thermistor tip, external non-invasive heating of stented arterial segments, and evolution and application of bevacizumab-eluting stent for the inhibition of microvessel growth in unstable atherosclerotic plaques. He has been worked lately on invasive treatment methods of resistant hypertension by novel sympathetic denervation techniques of the renal arteries (chemical denervation, barodenervation). He has presented his research results by more than 3,500 abstracts in international scientific conferences and has given over 260 lectures as invited speaker internationally.

== Publications ==
Stefanadis has published 1685 research articles in international peer reviewed medical journals. The h-index factor for these publications is 142. According to Publons research database of Clarivate analytics, Professor Stefanadis holds the 1st place amongst researchers and authors internationally, in terms of number of verified publications with 3079 published papers. He is the editor of 6 medical books of international publications and has written chapters in 13 international books. He is Chief Editor of the Hellenic Journal of Cardiology, and member of the editorial board and reviewer in Greek and International Scientific Journals.

Journal of Clinical and Diagnostic Research has published an "Analysis of Global Research Trends in

Cardiology Over the Last two Decades" listing Christodoulos Stefanadis at the first rank among top authors for clinical cardiology research.

== Honors and awards ==
Stefanadis was awarded the title of "Elite Reviewer" by the scientific journal Journal of the American College of Cardiology (JACC) in recognition of his whole contribution to the journal's publications (2005) and the international journal Clinical Cardiology dedicated a special honorary article to him entitled "Profiles in Cardiology" in a 2007 issue.

The American College of Cardiology awarded him the Simon Dack's Award (2011), which is given annually to the scientist with the most important contribution to the scientific journals of the American College of Cardiology (Journal of the American College of Cardiology, JACC-Cardiovascular Interventions and JACC-Cardiovascular Imaging).

In 2022, he was elected a member of the Academia Europaea.

== Selected papers ==
- Stefanadis, C., Diamantopoulos, L., Vlachopoulos, C., Tsiamis, E., Dernellis, J., Toutouzas, K., Stefanadi, E., Toutouzas, P. Thermal heterogeneity within human atherosclerotic coronary arteries detected in vivo. A new method of detection by application of a special thermography catheter. Circulation. 1999 Apr 20;99(15):1965-71.
- Stefanadis, C., Tsiamis, E., Vlachopoulos, C., Stratos, C., Toutouzas, K., Pitsavos, C., Toutouzas, P. Unfavorable effect of smoking on the elastic properties of the human aorta. Circulation. 1997 Jan 7;95(1):31-8.
- Stefanadis, C., Stratos, C., Vlachopoulos, C., Marakas, S., Boudoulas, H., Kallikazaros, I., Tsiamis, E., Toutouzas, P. Pressure-diameter relation of the human aorta: A new method of determination by the application of a special ultrasonic dimension catheter. Circulation. 1995 Oct 15;92(8):2210-9.
- Stefanadis, C., Vlachopoulos, C., Karayannacos, P., Boudoulas, H., Stratos, C., Filippides, T., Agapitos, M., Toutouzas, P. Effect of vasa vasorum flow on structure and function of the aorta in experimental animals. Circulation. 1995 May 15;91(10):2669-78.
- Stefanadis, C., Toutouzas, K., Tsiamis, E., Stratos, C., Vavuranakis, M., Kallikazaros, I., Panagiotakos, D., Toutouzas, P. Rapid improvement of nitric oxide bioavailability after lipid-lowering therapy with cerivastatin within two weeks J Am Coll Cardiol. 2001 Apr;37(5):1351-8.
- Stefanadis, C., Dernellis, J., Vlachopoulos, C., Tsioufis, C., Tsiamis, E., Toutouzas, K., Pitsavos, C., Toutouzas, P. Aortic function in arterial hypertension determined by pressure-diameter relation: Effects of diltiazem. Circulation. 1997 Sep 16;96(6):1853-8.
- Stefanadis, C., Toutouzas, K., Tsiamis, E., Mitropoulos, I., Tsioufis, C., Kallikazaros, I., Pitsavos, C., Toutouzas, P. Thermal heterogeneity in stable human coronary atherosclerotic plaques is underestimated in vivo: The "cooling effect" of blood flow. J Am Coll Cardiol. 2003 Feb 5;41(3):403-8.
- Stefanadis, C., Dernellis, J., Stratos, C., Tsiamis, E., Vlachopoulos, C., Toutouzas, K., Lambrou, S., Pitsavos, C, Toutouzas, P. Effects of balloon mitral valvuloplasty on left atrial function in mitral stenosis as assessed by pressure-area relation. J Am Coll Cardiol. 1998 Jul;32(1):159-68.
- Stefanadis, C., Stratos, C., Pitsavos, C., Kallikazaros, I., Triposkiadis, F., Trikas, A., Vlachopoulos, C., Gavaliatsis, I, Toutouzas, P. Retrograde nontransseptal balloon mitral valvuloplasty: Immediate results and long-term follow-up. Circulation. 1992 May;85(5):1760-7.
- Stefanadis, C., Dernellis, J., Stratos, C., Tsiamis, E., Tsioufis, C., Toutouzas, K., Vlachopoulos, C., Pitsavos, C, Toutouzas, P. Assessment of left atrial pressure-area relation in humans by means of retrograde left atrial catheterization and echocardiographic automatic boundary detection: Effects of dobutamine. J Am Coll Cardiol. 1998 Feb;31(2):426-36.
