= Dora Bakoyannis =

Greek politician (born 1954)

Dora Bakoyanni
- Ντόρα Μπακογιάννη
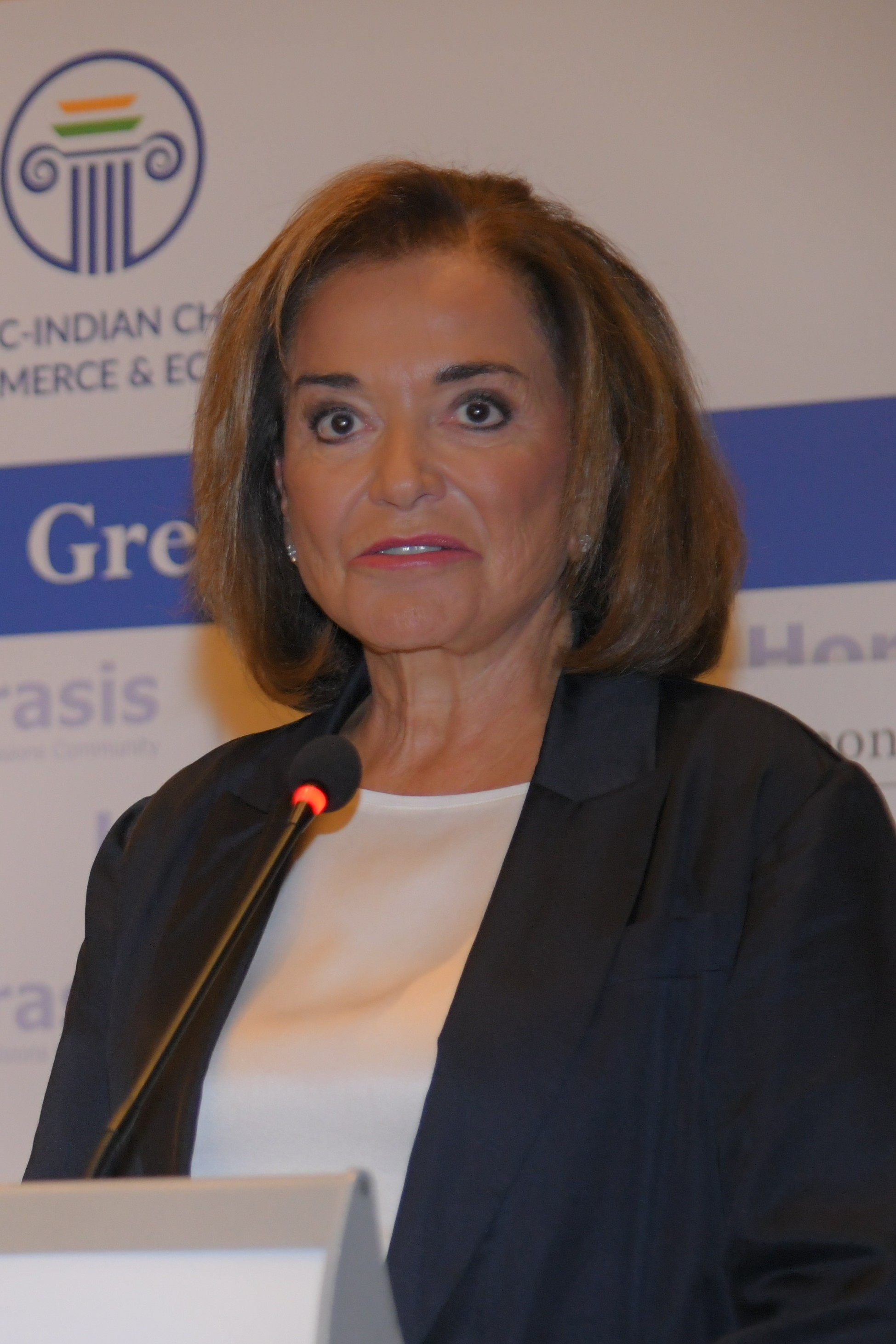
- Bakoyanni in 2024

Minister of Foreign Affairs
- In office 15 February 2006 – 6 October 2009
- Prime Minister: Kostas Karamanlis
- Preceded by: Petros Molyviatis
- Succeeded by: George Papandreou

Mayor of Athens
- In office 1 January 2003 – 14 February 2006
- Preceded by: Dimitris Avramopoulos
- Succeeded by: Theodoros Bechrakis (acting)

Minister for Culture
- In office 3 December 1992 – 13 October 1993
- Prime Minister: Konstantinos Mitsotakis
- Preceded by: Anna Benaki-Psarouda
- Succeeded by: Melina Mercouri

Leader of Democratic Alliance
- In office 21 November 2010 – 21 May 2012

Member of the Hellenic Parliament
- Incumbent
- Assumed office 5 November 1989
- Constituency: Chania (2019–present); Athens A (1996–2002, 2007–2012, 2015–2019); National (2012–2015); Evrytania (1989–1996)

Personal details
- Born: Theodora Mitsotaki; May 6, 1954 (age 72) Athens, Greece
- Party: New Democracy (Before 2010; 2012–present); Democratic Alliance (2010–2012)
- Spouses: Pavlos Bakoyannis (m. 1974; died 1989) Isidoros Kouvelos (m. 1998)
- Children: Alexia; Kostas
- Parents: Konstantinos Mitsotakis (father); Marika Giannoukou (mother)
- Relatives: Alexandra Mitsotaki (sister); Kyriakos Mitsotakis (brother); Eleftherios Venizelos (great-uncle)
- Education: LMU Munich; University of Athens
- Website: Official website

Theodora "Dora" Bakoyanni (Greek: Θεοδώρα "Ντόρα" Μπακογιάννη, pronounced [ˈdoɾa bakoˈʝani]; née Mitsotaki, Greek: Μητσοτάκη; born May 6, 1954) is a Greek politician. From 2006 to 2009 she was Minister of Foreign Affairs of Greece, the highest position ever to have been held by a woman in the Cabinet of Greece at the time; she was also Chairperson-in-Office of the Organization for Security and Co-operation in Europe in 2009. Previously she was the Mayor of Athens from 2003 to 2006, the first female mayor in the city's history, and the first woman to serve as mayor of a city hosting the Olympic Games. She also served as Minister for Culture of Greece from 1992 to 1993.

Bakoyannis has been serving as an independent member of the Hellenic Parliament representing unofficially Democratic Alliance, the political party she founded in 2010, having been expelled from the opposition New Democracy party due to voting against the party line. In May 2012, due to the critical situation in Greece before the elections and given the established electoral law, Democratic Alliance decided to cooperate with New Democracy, based on a specific framework of values and to suspend its activities. Dora Bakoyannis rejoined New Democracy on 21 May 2012, ahead of the parliamentary election in June, where she headed the state deputies' ballot.

== Early life and education ==
Bakoyannis was born in Athens in 1954 to a prominent Greek family in the field of politics. She is the eldest of four children of the veteran Greek politician Konstantinos Mitsotakis, former Prime Minister of Greece and former leader of the country's main centre-right political party New Democracy, and Marika Mitsotakis (née Giannoukou). Her paternal family originates from Chania, Crete, and has a long tradition in the politics of Greece. Her mother’s family is from Athens and the Peloponnese. Besides her father and herself, other members of the family include prominent politicians such as her grandfather, Kyriakos, and his brother Aristomenis, while her younger brother Kyriakos is the current Prime Minister of Greece. She is also a great-granddaughter of Eleftherios Venizelos' sister. This decade-long involvement has been criticized as evidence of family-rule in Greek political life.

During her early school years, she attended the German School of Athens. Her family was exiled to Turkey then to Paris by the Greek military junta in 1968, thus she completed her secondary schooling at the German School of Paris. She then studied political science and communication at LMU Munich without graduating. After the collapse of the junta, she returned to Greece and continued her academic studies in public law at the National and Kapodistrian University of Athens. In addition to Greek, Bakoyannis is fluent in English, French and German.

=== Venizelos/Mitsotakis/Bakoyannis family tree ===
Main members of the Venizelos/Mitsotakis family. Prime Ministers of Greece are highlighted in light blue.

Kyriakos Venizelos (?–1883)	Styliani Ploumidaki (1830–1897)
Eleftherios Venizelos (1864–1936)	Katingo Venizelou (1858–1934)	Constantine "Costis" Mitsotakis (1845–1898)
Kyriakos Venizelos (1892–1942)	Sofoklis Venizelos (1894–1964)	Kyriakos Mitsotakis (1892–1942)	Stavroula Ploumidaki (1896–1983)
Nikitas Venizelos (1930–2020)	Konstantinos Mitsotakis (1918–2017)	Marika Giannoukou (1930–2012)
Pavlos Bakoyannis (1935–1989)	Dora Bakoyanni née Mitsotaki (b. 1954)	Kyriakos Mitsotakis (b. 1968)
Kostas Bakoyannis (b. 1978)

== Political career ==
=== Minister for Culture, 1992–1993 ===
In the November 1989 election, Bakoyannis successfully contested her late husband's seat in the Evrytania constituency and was re-elected a member of the Hellenic Parliament in the 1990 election and served as a Parliamentary Under-Secretary of State, following the election of her father as Prime Minister of Greece. From September 1991 to August 1992, she served in the General Secretariat of International Affairs for New Democracy and represented the party at the European Democrat Union and the International Democrat Union. From December 1992, she served as Minister for Culture of Greece until the 1993 election, when she was re-elected a member of Parliament for New Democracy as the main opposition party.

=== Years in opposition ===
On 29 April 1994, Bakoyannis was elected in the Central Committee of New Democracy by the party's Third Congress. In the 1996 election Bakoyannis was a candidate for a first time in the Athens A' electoral district and was elected again as member of Parliament, coming first of all the candidates in it, something that was repeated in the 2000 election. Meanwhile, on 22 March 1997, she was elected again to the Central Committee of New Democracy by the party's Fourth Congress. She also served for two terms as the chairperson of the party's Executive Committee later. In September 1997 she was appointed by New Democracy leader Kostas Karamanlis in the party's Department for Development and as Shadow Minister of Foreign Affairs and Defence in May 2000.

=== Mayor of Athens, 2002–2006 ===
On 29 March 2002, Bakoyannis was picked to run for Mayor of Athens in the 2002 local elections, both a choice of Kostas Karamanlis who was looking for a way to demonstrate New Democracy's growing strength against the ruling Panhellenic Socialist Movement and a chance for Bakoyannis to earn prestige by this office in advance of the city hosting the Olympic games. She was elected what was aired as Athens' first female mayor in the city's 3,500-year history, defeating her socialist opponent Christos Papoutsis and receiving a percentage of 60.6% in the runoff. As mayor, she was heavily involved in the preparation of the 2004 Athens Olympic Games, the first woman to serve as mayor of a city hosting the Olympic Games, and passed the Olympic flag to the mayor of Beijing, Wang Qishan. In 2005 she was awarded the World Mayor Prize.

In 2003, upon the invitation of Romano Prodi, then President of the European Commission, Bakoyannis joined a group of 12 high-level independent figures from Europe, as a member of a prestigious round-table conference, contributing proposals on the social character, cultural identity and economic future of new Europe.

=== Minister of Foreign Affairs, 2006–2009 ===
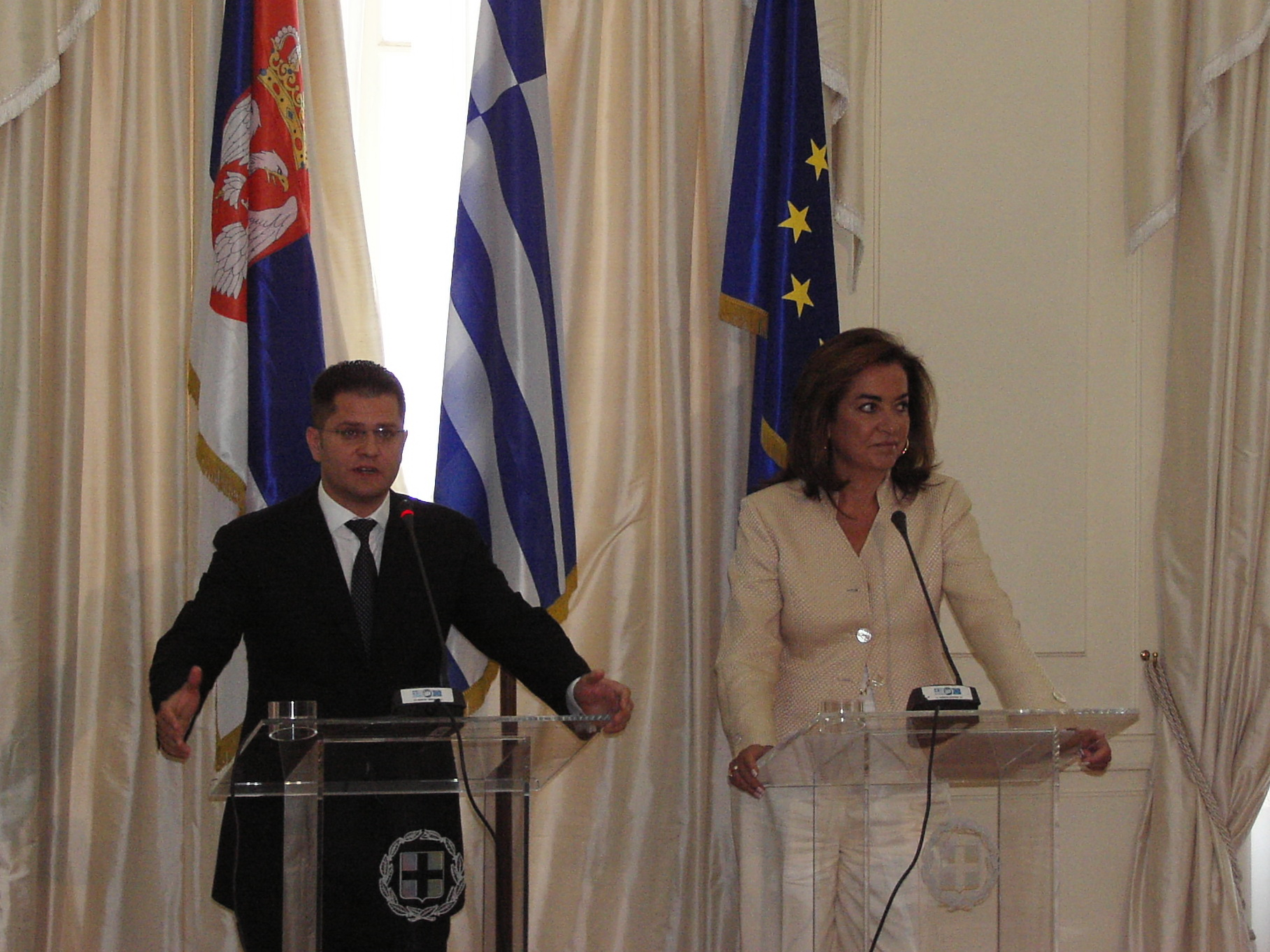
Dora Bakoyannis with Vuk Jeremić, Minister of Foreign Affairs of Serbia.

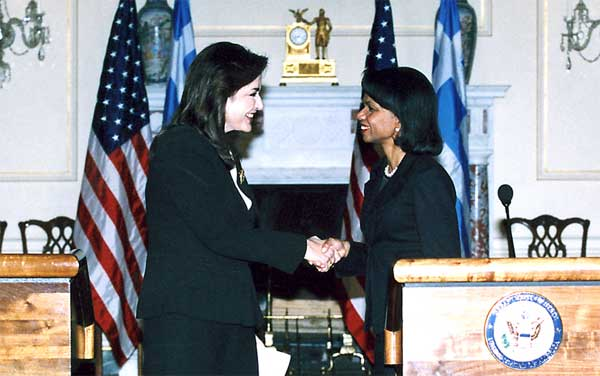
Dora Bakoyannis with Condoleezza Rice, United States Secretary of State.

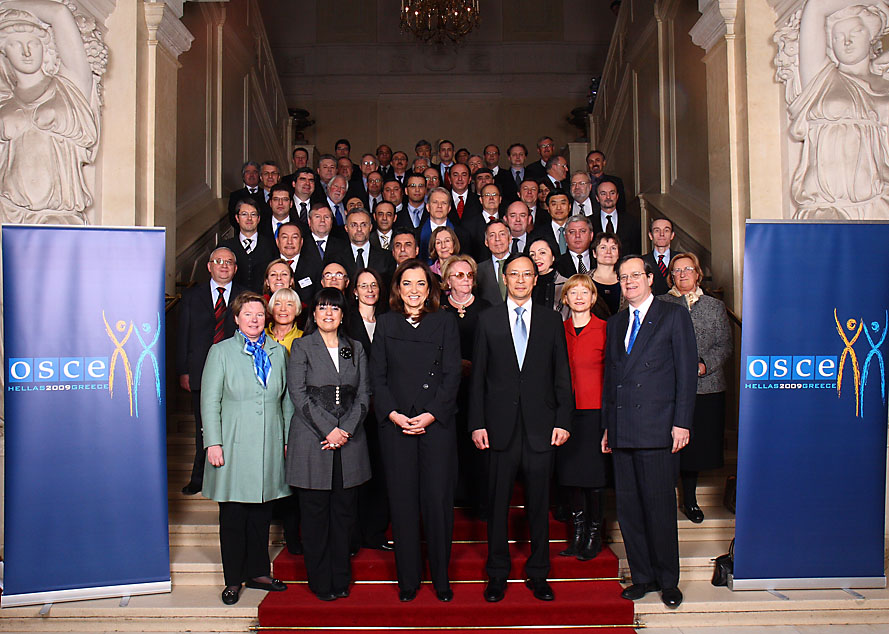
OSCE Family Photo Vienna 15-01-2009

Bakoyannis left the office of Mayor before the end of her term, replaced by acting mayor Fotini Pipili, to become Minister of Foreign Affairs of Greece on 15 February 2006 and thus the highest-ranking woman in the history of the Cabinet of Greece. She also retained the position after the 2007 election, managing to be elected as a member of the Hellenic Parliament first among all the candidates in the Athens A' constituency once more. As Minister of Foreign Affairs, Bakoyannis assumed the rotating Greek presidency of the United Nations Security Council in September 2006, while at a time of international tensions over nuclear programs in Iran and North Korea and amidst a fragile United Nations brokered cease-fire in Lebanon.

During her incumbency, she promoted the cooperation in the Balkans, where Greek companies are heavily investing, traveled through the Middle East to help outline solutions to problems and attended meetings of the Organization for Security and Co-operation in Europe to discuss developments in the region. She also promoted the ratification of the Treaty of Lisbon by the Hellenic Parliament and supported Nicolas Sarkozy's plan about the Union for the Mediterranean, but did not reach a conciliation with Turkey and the Republic of Macedonia over the Cyprus dispute and the Macedonia naming dispute respectively.

=== OSCE Chairperson-in-Office ===
Bakoyannis served as the Chairperson-in-Office of the Organization for Security and Co-operation in Europe from January 2009 to 6 October 2009. As the political leader of the OSCE, she was responsible for the external representation and the appointments of the Organization. She also oversaw the activities of the OSCE in conflict prevention, crisis management and post-conflict rehabilitation. During her chairmanship, she was assisted by her staff and Marc Perrin de Brichambaut, the Secretary General of the OSCE, as well as by her predecessor Alexander Stubb and successor Marat Tazhin, who both formed along with Bakoyannis the OSCE Troika.

== Later political role ==
Bakoyannis was expelled from New Democracy on May 7, 2010, on the grounds of having defied New Democracy's line and voting "in favor" of a salient piece of legislation introducing the harsh austerity measures that were required for European Union-International Monetary Fund backed lending. She continued to hold her parliamentary seat, originally secured by New Democracy, as an independent. On November 21, 2010, she founded her own political party called the Democratic Alliance.

A member of the Greek delegation to the Parliamentary Assembly of the Council of Europe since 2012, Bakoyannis serves as chairwoman of the Sub-Committee on relations with the OECD and the EBRD. She is also a member of the Committee on Political Affairs and Democracy, which she chaired from 2014 to 2016; a member of the Committee on the Honouring of Obligations and Commitments by Member States of the Council of Europe (Monitoring Committee); co-rapporteur for the monitoring of Russia (alongside Liliane Maury Pasquier); and rapporteur on the Syrian Civil War. In 2019, she announced her candidacy to succeed Thorbjørn Jagland as Secretary General of the Council of Europe. The position was ultimately won by Croatia's Foreign Minister Marija Pejčinović Burić.

In 2015, Bakoyannis was named a member of the OSCE Panel of Eminent Persons on European Security as a Common Project, chaired by Wolfgang Ischinger.

== Other activities ==
- Centre for European Policy Studies (CEPS), Member of the Board of Directors
- European Council on Foreign Relations (ECFR), Member of the Council

== Recognition ==
In March 1992, the International Centre for Women awarded Bakoyannis the International Leadership Award, and in June 1993, she was recognised by the 14th International Symposium Fontana di Roma for her valuable contribution to culture.

Bakoyannis received the honor of being elected World Mayor in 2005, an annual internet-based project organized by City Mayors in order to honor the mayors who have served their communities well. Her efforts to get Athens ready to host the 2004 Summer Olympics successfully, her actions to transform the city for the benefit of its residents and her fight against terrorism helped Bakoyannis win the award. During the contest she was strongly supported by the Greek community and also received thousands of votes from several countries around Europe, North America, South America, Australia, and New Zealand. She had also been continuously included in the Forbes Magazine's List of The World's 100 Most Powerful Women from 2006 to 2008. In 2008, she was awarded the Emperor Maximilian Award-European Award for Regional Policy and Local Government by the State of Tyrol and the city of Innsbruck. In 2009, she was named as the first female foreign associate of the French Academy in Humanities and Political Sciences. The same year, she was also awarded the title of Honorary Senator by the European Academy of Sciences and Arts in Salzburg. In 2010, Dora Bakoyannis has been awarded the National Order of the Chevalry of the Legion of Honour of the French Republic (Ordre Nationale de Chevalier de la Legion d' Honneur).

On 21 March 2008, she received a copy of the key of the city of Tirana on the occasion of her official visit to Albania.

== Remarkable incidents ==
On December 13, 2002, two months after taking office as mayor of Athens, an assassination attempt was made on her by a perpetrator who was considered mentally disturbed.

In March 2021, the driver of her guard team killed a 23 year old man outside the Hellenic Parliament and the driver fled so as not to be found. The police drove the eyewitnesses away from the scene of the accident.

== Personal life ==
In December 1974, she married journalist Pavlos Bakoyannis and later gave birth to their two children, Alexia and Kostas. In 1977, she took examinations at the Ministry of Economic Coordination and was appointed in the Department of European Economic Community Affairs. When her father was elected leader of New Democracy in 1984, she served as chief of staff until 1989. On 26 September 1989, her husband, who had been elected a member of the Hellenic Parliament in the June 1989 election and was the chief architect for the Andreas Papandreou indictment for Koskotas scandal, was assassinated by members of the terrorist group Revolutionary Organization 17 November, as he entered his office building. She later married businessman Isidoros Kouvelos in 1998, but retains her late husband's surname. Her second husband is currently the president of the Hellenic Olympic Committee.

On October 18, 2021, she revealed that she had been diagnosed with multiple myeloma - a type of cancer of white blood cells.

Political offices
Preceded by Anna Benaki-Psarouda	Minister for Culture; 1992–1993	Succeeded by Melina Mercouri
Preceded by Dimitris Avramopoulos	Mayor of Athens; 2003–2006	Succeeded by Nikitas Kaklamanis
Preceded by Petros Molyviatis	Minister for Foreign Affairs; 2006–2009	Succeeded by George Papandreou
