= Kostas Bakoyannis =

Greek politician

- Κώστας Μπακογιάννης
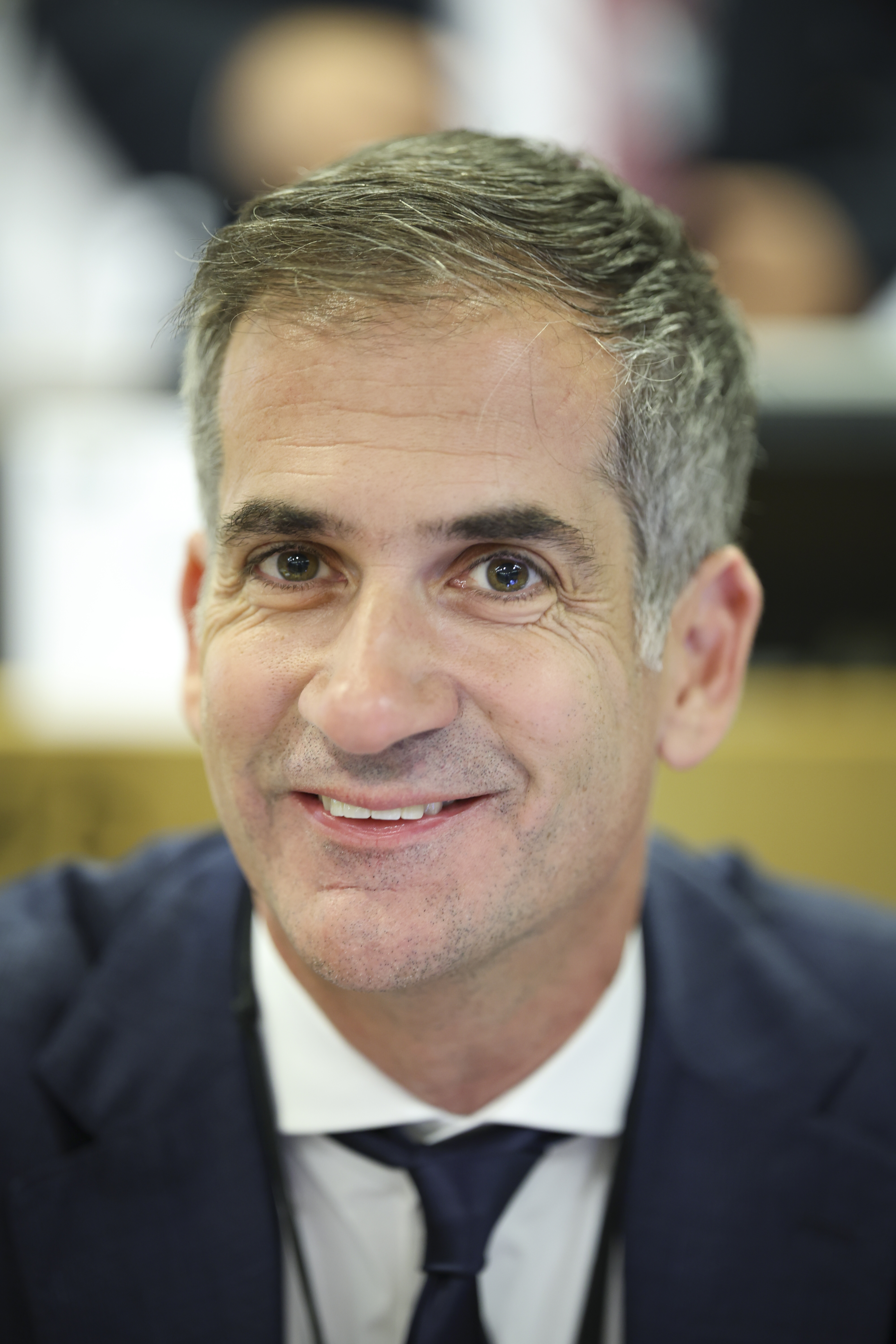
- Bakoyannis in 2025

Mayor of Athens
- In office 1 September 2019 – 31 December 2023
- Preceded by: Georgios Mproulias (acting)
- Succeeded by: Haris Doukas

Regional Governor of Central Greece
- In office 1 September 2014 – 31 August 2019
- Preceded by: Klearchos Pergantas
- Succeeded by: Fanis Spanos

Mayor of Karpenisi
- In office 1 January 2011 – 31 August 2014
- Preceded by: Vasileios Karampas
- Succeeded by: Nikos Souliotis

Personal details
- Born: 16 March 1978 (age 48) Athens, Greece
- Party: New Democracy
- Parent(s): Pavlos Bakoyannis (father); Dora Bakoyanni (mother)
- Relatives: Kyriakos Mitsotakis (uncle)
- Education: Millfield; Brown University (BA); Harvard University (MPA); St Antony's College, Oxford (PhD)

Kostas Bakoyannis (Greek: Κώστας Μπακογιάννης; born 16 March 1978) is a Greek politician. He serves as leader of the opposition of Athens since 2024. Furthermore, he served as mayor of Athens from 2019 to 2023, as governor of Central Greece from 2014 to 2019 and as mayor of the town of Karpenisi from 2011 to 2014.

== Early life and education ==
Born 1978 in Athens to New Democracy politicians Dora and Pavlos Bakoyannis, Kostas Bakoyannis lost his father Pavlos in 1989, when he was assassinated by the leftist terrorist group, Revolutionary Organization 17 November. Bakoyannis graduated from Millfield, a public school in Somerset, England, in 1996. He studied history and International Relations at Brown University and graduated from Harvard with a Master of Public Administration. He holds a PhD thesis at St Antony's College, Oxford, in the field of Political Science and International Relations. He speaks Greek, English and German. Kostas Bakoyannis' articles are often published in the Greek and foreign press.

His uncle is the current Greek Prime Minister Kyriakos Mitsotakis, and his maternal grandfather was the former prime minister Konstantinos Mitsotakis.

== Career ==
=== Mayor of Karpenisi (2011–2014) ===
In August 2010, Bakoyannis announced to run for mayoral office as an independent candidate in the small town of Karpenisi in Evrytania, where his father had originally come from. New Democracy decided not to challenge Bakoyannis with a candidate of its own, though the party had expelled his mother Dora in May for voting in favor of the austerity measures proposed by the Papandreou government.

Kostas Bakoyannis won the local elections with 54.3%. In a To Vima interview he strongly defended the bailout deal stating that "where we have come to after all the crimes that the Greek political system made over the past 30 years, we had no choice but the Memorandum." He said that he wouldn't rule out joining the new Democratic Alliance party his mother had founded, and that "Greece needs suicidal governments ready to kill themselves to save the country."

=== Regional governor of Central Greece (2014–2019) ===
During his third year as Mayor of Karpenisi, Bakoyannis decided to run for the governorship of Central Greece, again as an independent. His decision to leave the Mayorship was initiated by a growing number of citizen’s voices from the greater Central Greece area, not only Karpenisi, who saw the risks and the opportunities that were coming up ahead for their area in the next 5 year term of the new Governor, and wanted a results oriented, tested and tried candidate for the job. He was however backed by New Democracy, which again nominated no candidate of its own, and clearly won the 2014 regional election with 56.06% in the second round, defeating Syriza's candidate Evangelos Apostolou.

=== Mayor of Athens (2019–2023) ===
Bakoyannis was elected Mayor of Athens after the local elections of 2019 and took office on 1 September 2019.

Bakoyannis lost re-election in 2023, being defeated by Haris Doukas in the 2023 Athens municipal elections.

== Other activities ==
- European Council on Foreign Relations (ECFR), Member

== Personal life ==
He has four children, Pavlos, Olympia, Danai and Dimos.

Main members of the Venizelos/Mitsotakis family. Prime Ministers of Greece are highlighted in light blue.

Kyriakos Venizelos (?–1883) | Styliani Ploumidaki (1830–1897)
Eleftherios Venizelos (1864–1936) | Katingo Venizelou (1858–1934) | Constantine "Costis" Mitsotakis (1845–1898)
Kyriakos Venizelos (1892–1942) | Sofoklis Venizelos (1894–1964) | Kyriakos Mitsotakis (1892–1942) | Stavroula Ploumidaki (1896–1983)
Nikitas Venizelos (1930–2020) | Konstantinos Mitsotakis (1918–2017) | Marika Giannoukou (1930–2012)
Pavlos Bakoyannis (1935–1989) | Dora Bakoyanni née Mitsotaki (b. 1954) | Kyriakos Mitsotakis (b. 1968)
Kostas Bakoyannis (b. 1978)
