= Marika Mitsotakis =

Greek politician (1930–2012)

- Μαρίκα Μητσοτάκη

Spouse of the Prime Minister of Greece
- In role 11 April 1990 – 13 October 1993
- Prime Minister: Konstantinos Mitsotakis
- Preceded by: Lola Zolota
- Succeeded by: Dimitra Liani

Personal details
- Born: Marika Giannoukou; November 29, 1930 Athens, Greece
- Died: May 6, 2012 (aged 81) Athens, Greece
- Spouse: Konstantinos Mitsotakis
- Children: Dora; Alexandra; Aikaterini; Kyriakos

Marika Mitsotakis (née Giannoukou, Greek: Μαρίκα Μητσοτάκη; November 29, 1930 – May 6, 2012) was the wife of the former Prime Minister of Greece Konstantinos Mitsotakis. She was regarded as a prominent political voice with the New Democracy political party, her husband's government, and Greek politics. She was nicknamed "Mrs. Marika" among Greeks.

== Biography ==
=== Personal life ===
Marika Giannoukou was born to a prominent Athenian family on November 29, 1930. She contracted poliomyelitis at a swimming pool when she was seventeen years old. She survived the illness, but lived with a walking disability for the rest of her life. In addition to her political activities, Mitsotakis became an activist for people with disabilities in Greece.

She married Konstantinos Mitsotakis, member of a political family from Crete, in 1953. The couple had four children: Dora, who served as the Minister of Foreign Affairs of Greece from 2006 to 2009 and Mayor of Athens from 2003 until 2006, Alexandra, a civil-society activist, Katerina (Aikaterini) and Kyriakos, a member of the Hellenic Parliament from the New Democracy party who on 8 July 2019 became Prime Minister of Greece. Konstantinos served as the head of the New Democracy political party from 1984 to 1993.

=== Political influence ===
Mitsotakis served as the Spouse of the Prime Minister from 1990 to 1993 during her husband's tenure as head of government. She assumed the traditional role of the wife of a Prime Minister, being quoted in Time Magazine at the time of the 1990 election saying, "Finally, my Kostas, we've made it." However, she was known for her political skills and outspokenness. In 1990, soon after taking office, Prime Minister Mitsotakis made his first appearance in the Greek parliament. A member of the Panhellenic Socialist Movement (PASOK) accused Marika of making "insolent gestures" towards socialist politicians during the session. Marika responded to the lawmaker's accusation, "I'll get my stick and beat you with it." In 1991, Marika publicly criticized Minister of Industry Stavros Dimas. Dimas quickly resigned during an official trip to the Soviet Union as a result of Marika's criticism.

Mitsotakis often defended her husband against political opponents. She also likened his calm political style and persona to the calming effect of Valium, telling a reporter, "If you chopped (him) into little pieces, you could sell him as Valium tablets."

Mitsotakis was widely regarded as an excellent cook in Greek political circles, leading to an urban legend that she used her culinary skills to influence politics. Political opponents of Konstantinos Mitsotakis accused her of using food to persuade two members of the Communist Party of Greece to join a 1989 coalition government with the conservatives with the purpose of pursuing corruption charges against Andreas Papandreou. Marika used the urban legend to write, publish and market her 2011 best-selling cookbook, Recipes With a Bit of History published in English in 2012 with the title Recipes of Love.

Mitsotakis was hospitalized on April 17, 2012. She died at the Evgenidion Hospital in Athens on May 6, 2012, at the age of 81. She was survived by her husband and their four children, thirteen grandchildren and five great-grandchildren.

== Venizelos/Mitsotakis family tree ==
Main members of the Venizelos/Mitsotakis family. Prime Ministers of Greece are highlighted in light blue.

Kyriakos Venizelos (?–1883)	Styliani Ploumidaki (1830–1897)
Eleftherios Venizelos (1864–1936)	Katingo Venizelou (1858–1934)	Constantine "Costis" Mitsotakis (1845–1898)
Kyriakos Venizelos (1892–1942)	Sofoklis Venizelos (1894–1964)	Kyriakos Mitsotakis (1892–1942)	Stavroula Ploumidaki (1896–1983)
Nikitas Venizelos (1930–2020)	Konstantinos Mitsotakis (1918–2017)	Marika Giannoukou (1930–2012)
Pavlos Bakoyannis (1935–1989)	Dora Bakoyanni née Mitsotaki (b. 1954)	Kyriakos Mitsotakis (b. 1968)
Kostas Bakoyannis (b. 1978)
