= Pavlos Bakoyannis =

Greek politician (1935–1989)

- Παύλος Μπακογιάννης

Member of the Hellenic Parliament

Personal details
- Born: 10 February 1935 Velota, Greece
- Died: 26 October 1989 (aged 54) Athens, Greece
- Cause of death: Assassination
- Party: New Democracy
- Spouse: Dora Mitsotaki (m. 1974)
- Children: Alexia and Kostas

Pavlos Bakoyannis (Greek: Παύλος Μπακογιάννης; 10 February 1935 – 26 September 1989) was a Greek liberal politician who was well known for his broadcasts against the Greek military junta of 1967–1974 on Bayerischer Rundfunk radio. He was killed by Revolutionary Organization 17 November, a Greek Marxist–Leninist urban guerrilla group.

== Early life ==
Pavlos Bakoyannis was born 10 February 1935 in Velota, Evrytania.

== Political career ==
Bakoyannis was a member of the New Democracy party, for which, at the time of his murder, he was parliamentary leader in the Hellenic Parliament.

== Death ==
On 26 September 1989, at the age of 54, Bakoyannis was shot and killed in the front entrance of his office by members of the urban guerrilla group Revolutionary Organization 17 November. It was on the same day that the Hellenic Parliament would vote on the indictment of Andreas Papandreou for Koskotas scandal, and Bakoyannis was the architect of collaboration between the left and right wings for Papandreou's indictment.

=== Aftermath ===
17N issued a statement following Bakoyannis's assassination, saying, "We therefore decided to execute the fraud and robber of the people Bakoyannis. This gentleman is responsible not only because he stole the first 60 million of the founding capital of the Line, but also for the hundreds of millions he either stole together with his partner Koskotas for the increase of the share capital of the Line, but also for the purchase through Line of the Bank of Crete".

Dimitris Koufodinas, Iraklis Kostaris and Alexandros Giotopoulos were sentenced to life imprisonment for the murder by an Athens court in December 2003. Savvas Xiros and Vassilis Tzortzatos both received 18-year sentences for the murder.

== Personal life ==
From December 1974, he was married to Dora Bakoyannis, daughter of Constantine Mitsotakis. After the murder of Pavlos, she passed a law prohibiting the publication of terrorist groups' post-attack manifestos in Greek newspapers. Dora Bakoyannis has since claimed that the bill was a mistake, and did not attempt to re-establish it after its repeal in 1993.

== Venizelos/Mitsotakis family tree ==
Main members of the Venizelos/Mitsotakis family. Prime Ministers of Greece are highlighted in light blue.

Kyriakos Venizelos (?–1883) | Styliani Ploumidaki (1830–1897)
Eleftherios Venizelos (1864–1936) | Katingo Venizelou (1858–1934) | Constantine "Costis" Mitsotakis (1845–1898)
Kyriakos Venizelos (1892–1942) | Sofoklis Venizelos (1894–1964) | Kyriakos Mitsotakis (1892–1942) | Stavroula Ploumidaki (1896–1983)
Nikitas Venizelos (1930–2020) | Konstantinos Mitsotakis (1918–2017) | Marika Giannoukou (1930–2012)
Pavlos Bakoyannis (1935–1989) | Dora Bakoyanni née Mitsotaki (b. 1954) | Kyriakos Mitsotakis (b. 1968)
Kostas Bakoyannis (b. 1978)
