= Nikitas Venizelos =

Greek politician (1930–2020)

Nikitas Venizelos (Greek: Νικήτας Βενιζέλος; July 1930 – 12 February 2020) was a Greek shipping magnate and politician who ran Venezelos SA.

He was involved also in politics. In the 1980s, he attempted a revival of the original liberal party, under the same name, while in the 1990s he supported the Political Spring party and Antonis Samaras.

Main members of the Venizelos/Mitsotakis family. Prime Ministers of Greece are highlighted in light blue.

Kyriakos Venizelos (?–1883)	Styliani Ploumidaki (1830–1897)
Eleftherios Venizelos (1864–1936)	Katingo Venizelou (1858–1934)	Constantine "Costis" Mitsotakis (1845–1898)
Kyriakos Venizelos (1892–1942)	Sofoklis Venizelos (1894–1964)	Kyriakos Mitsotakis (1892–1942)	Stavroula Ploumidaki (1896–1983)
Nikitas Venizelos (1930–2020)	Konstantinos Mitsotakis (1918–2017)	Marika Giannoukou (1930–2012)
Pavlos Bakoyannis (1935–1989)	Dora Bakoyanni née Mitsotaki (b. 1954)	Kyriakos Mitsotakis (b. 1968)
Kostas Bakoyannis (b. 1978)
