= Alexandra Mitsotaki =

Greek activist and social entrepreneur

Alexandra Mitsotaki is a Greek social entrepreneur. She is the cofounder and the current president of the NGO World Human Forum. Additionally, she is a former member of ActionAid Governing Board and a key figure in ActionAid Hellas as its founder and former president.

Mitsotaki is also connected to the Greek Cultural Centre (French: Centre Culturel Hellénique) in Paris, an organization she previously chaired for several years and now serves as its vice-president.

== Early life and education ==
Mitsotaki was born in 1956 in Athens, the second of four children of Marika (née Giannoukou; 1930–2012) and Konstantinos Mitsotakis (1918–2017), a prominent politician who served as prime minister of Greece (1990–1993). She has an older sister, the politician Dora Bakoyannis, and two younger siblings: Katerina and Kyriakos Mitsotakis, the latter currently serving as the prime minister of Greece.

Her adolescence was marked by her father’s imprisonment, and her family's house arrest and subsequent exile during the early stages of the Greek junta. She subsequently lived in Paris with her family and returned to Greece after the dictatorship's collapse and the restoration of democracy occurred. Following her graduation from the German School of Athens in 1975, Mitsotaki returned to Paris and enrolled at Sciences Po, where she earned a master's degree in political science. She also obtained a postgraduate degree in development law from the Paris Descartes University (also known as Paris V).

== Career and activities ==
Mitsotaki began her professional career at the OECD in Paris, where she worked at the Education Directorate and the Development Centre, focusing on development and poverty alleviation in developing countries. In 1997 she became a member of ActionAid and the following year she founded the organization’s chapter in Greece (ActionAid Hellas) which she chaired from 2007 to 2017. She was also a member of the board of ActionAid International (AAI) from 2003 to 2015. Over her tenure, more than 200,000 people from Greece supported AAH activities. During the period of Greece's Debt Crisis, ActionAid Hellas in cooperation with the French non-governmental organization Adie France (Association pour le droit à l'initiative économique), established Action Finance Initiative (AFI), the first microcredit institution in Greece.

From 2009 to 2019, Mitsotaki served as president of the Centre Culturel Hellénique (CCH), a Paris-based organization that promotes Greek culture in the Francophone world. She currently holds the position of vice-president. In 2017 she initiated in Delphi, Greece, the establishment of the World Human Forum, a global citizens’ initiative that brings together participants from various fields to address issues related to social, economic, and environmental transformation, and organizes events in iconic historical locations of Greece.

In 2019 she organized the Convergences Greece Forum. From 2021 to 2024 she was a member of the EC president Ursula von der Leyen's High Level Roundtable for the New European Bauhaus. In 2021, Mitsotaki was among a group of prominent Greek and French women who were honored by the French embassy in Athens on the occasion of International Women’s Day, with their portraits displayed on the building’s wall.

The following year, she organized in Greece the 1st New European Bauhaus Festival, themed ECO-building the Future, and held in parallel with the European festival across 26 countries. In 2023, Mitsotaki was the scientific editor of the Greek language edition for the book, Earth for All – A Survival Guide for Humanity, written by Sandrine Dixson-Declève, Owen Gaffney et al.

Mitsotaki is also the vice-president of Konstantinos K. Mitsotakis Foundation, adding an ecological orientation to its operations. In that capacity, she initiated the creation of the documentary film under the title Mountain Symphonies regarding Konstantinos Mitsotakis' life and his ecological concerns and work.

== Personal life ==
Mitsotaki is married and has four children. For many years based in Paris, she lives now in Athens, and maintains close ties to her siblings. In 2011, shortly before her mother's death, she contributed to the development and publication of Marika Mitsotakis’ book ‘’ Recipes of Love’’ (Greek: Συνταγές με... Ιστορία), which was released in Greek and English in 2011 and 2012 respectively.

In addition to her native Greek, she is also fluent in French, German and English.
