= 2021 KINAL leadership election =

1st leadership election

2021 Movement for Change leadership election
| ← 2017 | 5 December 2021 (first round); 12 December 2021 (second round) | 2024 → |
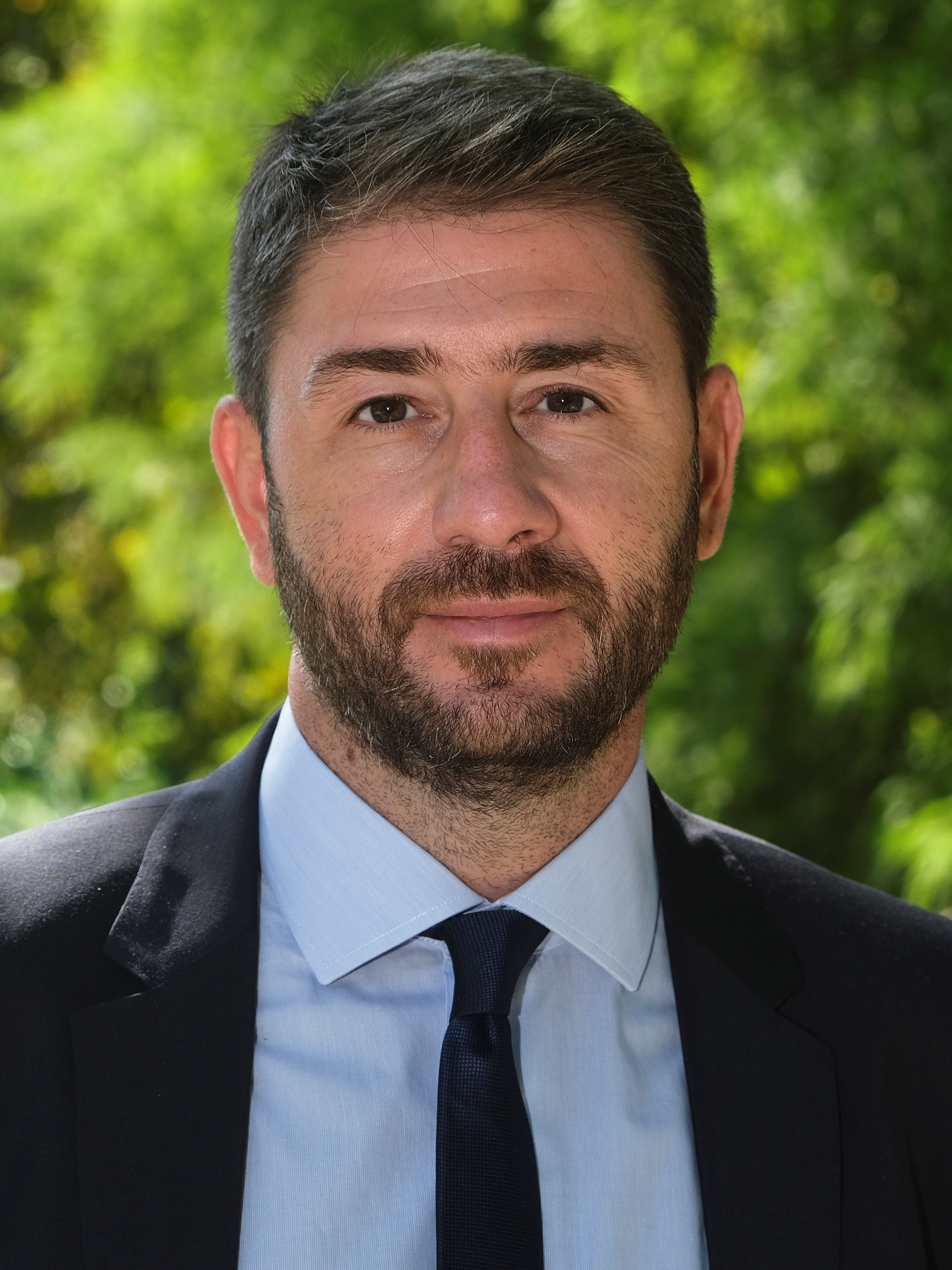

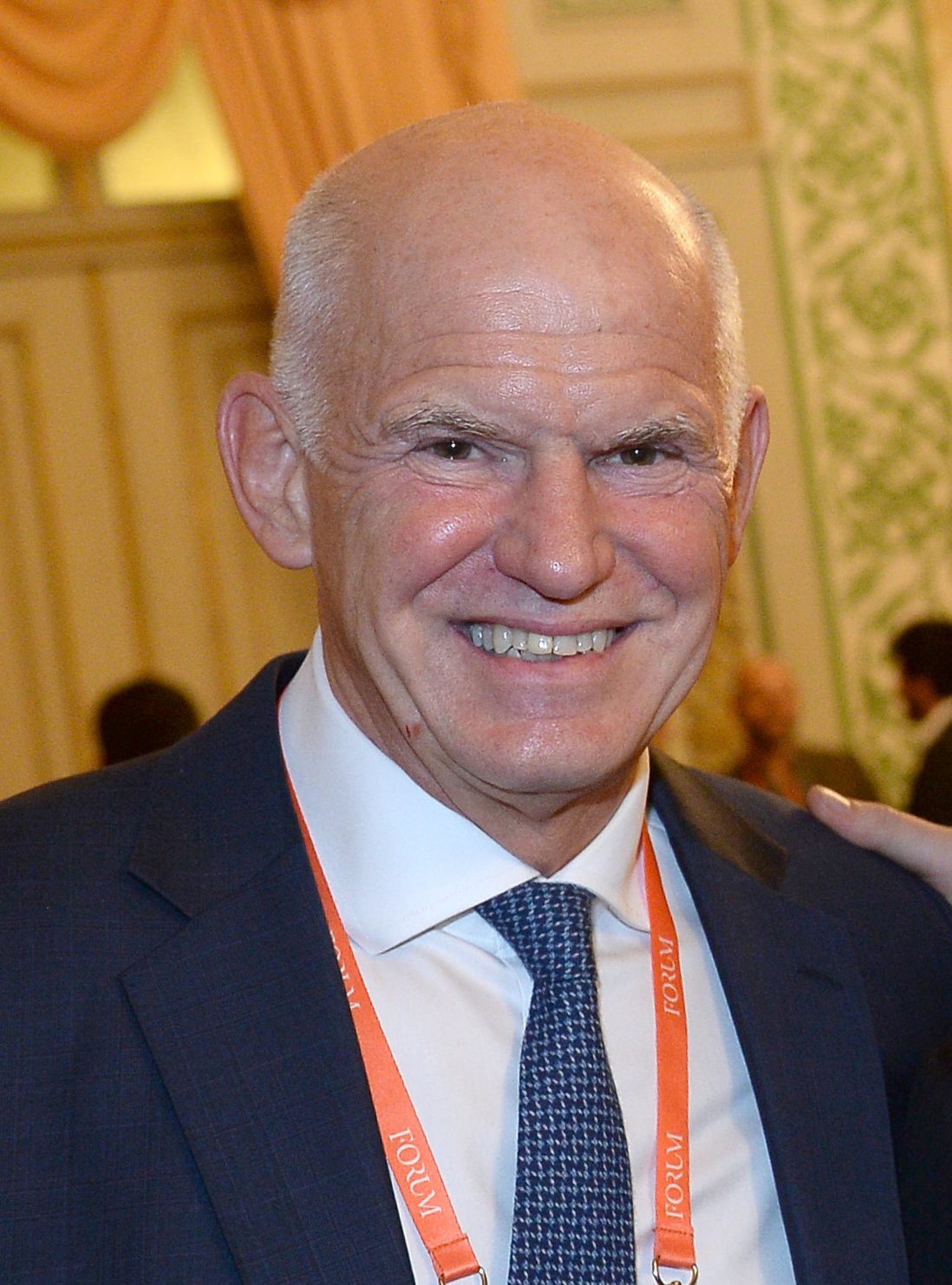

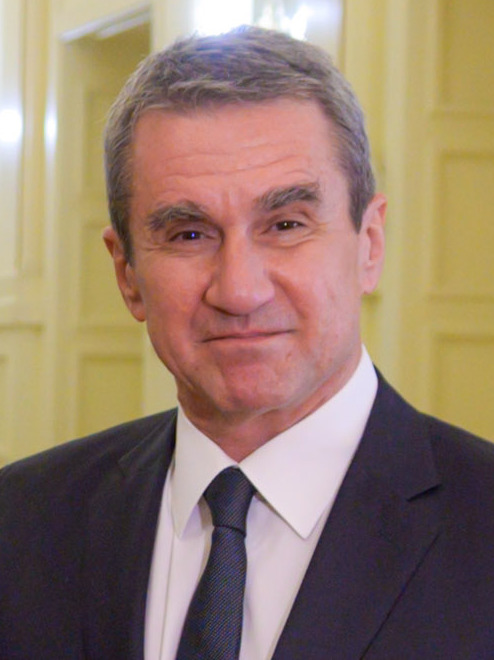
| Candidate | Nikos Androulakis | George Papandreou | Andreas Loverdos |
| Party | PASOK | KIDISO | PASOK |
| First round | 99,120 (36.9%) | 75,183 (28.0%) | 69,827 (26.0%) |
| Second round | 139,492 (67.2%) | 66,847 (32.2%) | Eliminated |
President before election
Fofi Gennimata
Elected President
Nikos Androulakis

The 2021 Movement for Change leadership election took place on 5 December 2021, in which six candidates took part. Since none of the candidates received 50% of the vote, a runoff election took place in 12 December, between Nikos Androulakis and George Papandreou.

The other candidates that took part were: Andreas Loverdos, Haris Kastanidis, Pavlos Geroulanos, and Pavlos Christidis. Nikos Androulakis won the runoff.

== Background ==
On 19 November 2017, the second round of the 2017 Greek centre-left leadership election took place, with Fofi Gennimata defeating Nikos Androulakis. Political parties that took part in the elections then moved on to the founding of the Movement for Change on 16 March 2018.

On 7 July 2019, early elections took place, in which the Movement for Change received 8,10% of the vote, along with the third place with 22 MPs. The percentage was considered disappointing by the party, blaming the President for it, expressed primarily from Pavlos Geroulanos. On November the 11th Congress of PASOK took place, aiming to extend the President's term till 2021, and also it was decided to combine the organs of Movement for Change with those of PASOK.

A conversation regarding the leadership elections started from the fall of 2020 within the Movement for Change, with Fofi Gennimata declaring that she would again stand as a candidate for them. On 25 November, Nikos Papandreou, MEP candidate in the 2019 EP elections, announced his candidacy for the position, but on 2 December, he suspended it. On 23 January 2021, Andreas Loverdos announced his candidacy for the leadership. Nikos Androulakis officially announced his candidacy in July 2021. On 1 September Haris Kastanidis also announced his candidancy.

On 3 October the Central Committee was convened, aiming to decide over the leadership elections. It was decided that the elections would take place on December 5, and the second round on the 12th. The candidates, according to the statute, are required to collect 5.000 movement member signatures, to get their candidacy approved. However, that was not specified at the meeting, as candidates were in disagreement. Anyone that wants to vote, can sign up as a member or a friend of the party up until the elections, paying 3 Euros in the process.

On 12 October, Fofi Gennimata announced her withdrawal from the electoral process, for health reasons.

On 13 October, Vassilis Kegkeroglou started collecting signatures, and announced his intention to run as a candidate and later, Pavlos Geroulanos also announced his candidacy. On 15 October, Pavlos Christidis announced his candidacy and resigned as Press Representative. On the same day, the final day for collecting signatures was moved from the 15th to 21 October. On 20 October, former Prime Minister, George Papandreou announced his candidacy. The next day, Vassilis Kegkeroglou withdrew from the electoral process, due to the candidacy of Papandreou.

On 22 October, the Statute Implementation and Certification Ethics Committee of the Movement of Change, after reviewing the collected signatures, officially declared the candidates.

On 25 October, the president of the Movement for Change, died at age 56 at Evangelismos Hospital from Cancer.

O 29 November, a debate took place on ERT, between five of the six candidates, while George Papandreou disagreed with the process and refused to take part. Questions were taken by Giorgos Kouvaras, Tasos Pappas and Pavlos Tsimas, while Antrianna Paraskevopoulou was the moderator.

On 5 December, the first round of the leadership elections took place. Nikos Androulakis reached the first place, George Papandreou reached the second spot. With the second round incoming, Andreas Loverdos backed Nikos Androulakis, while the other three candidates did not publicly back anyone.

On 12 December, the second round of the leadership elections took place. Nikos Androulakis came out as the winner, defeating George Papandreou, with a percentage of 67,60%.

== Candidacies ==
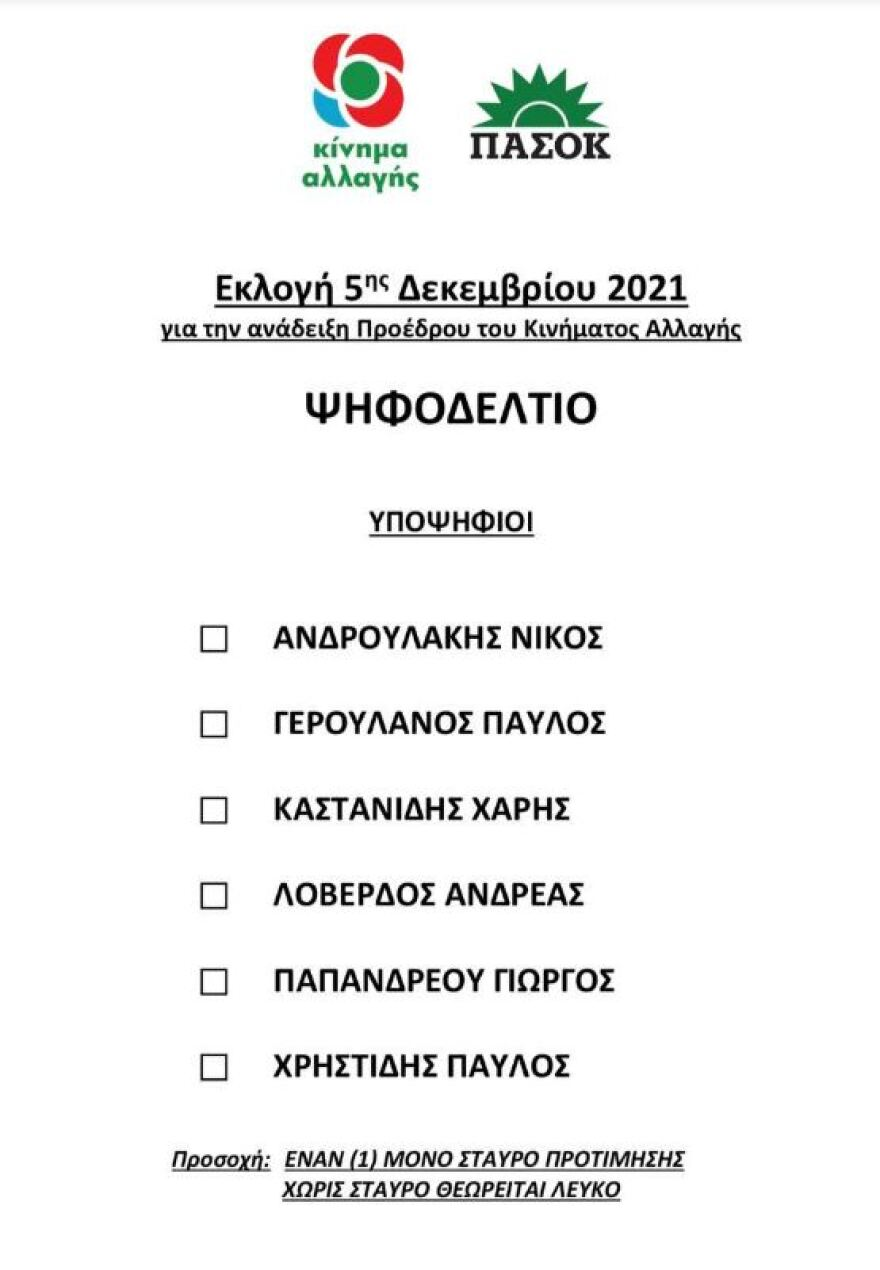
First round Ballot.

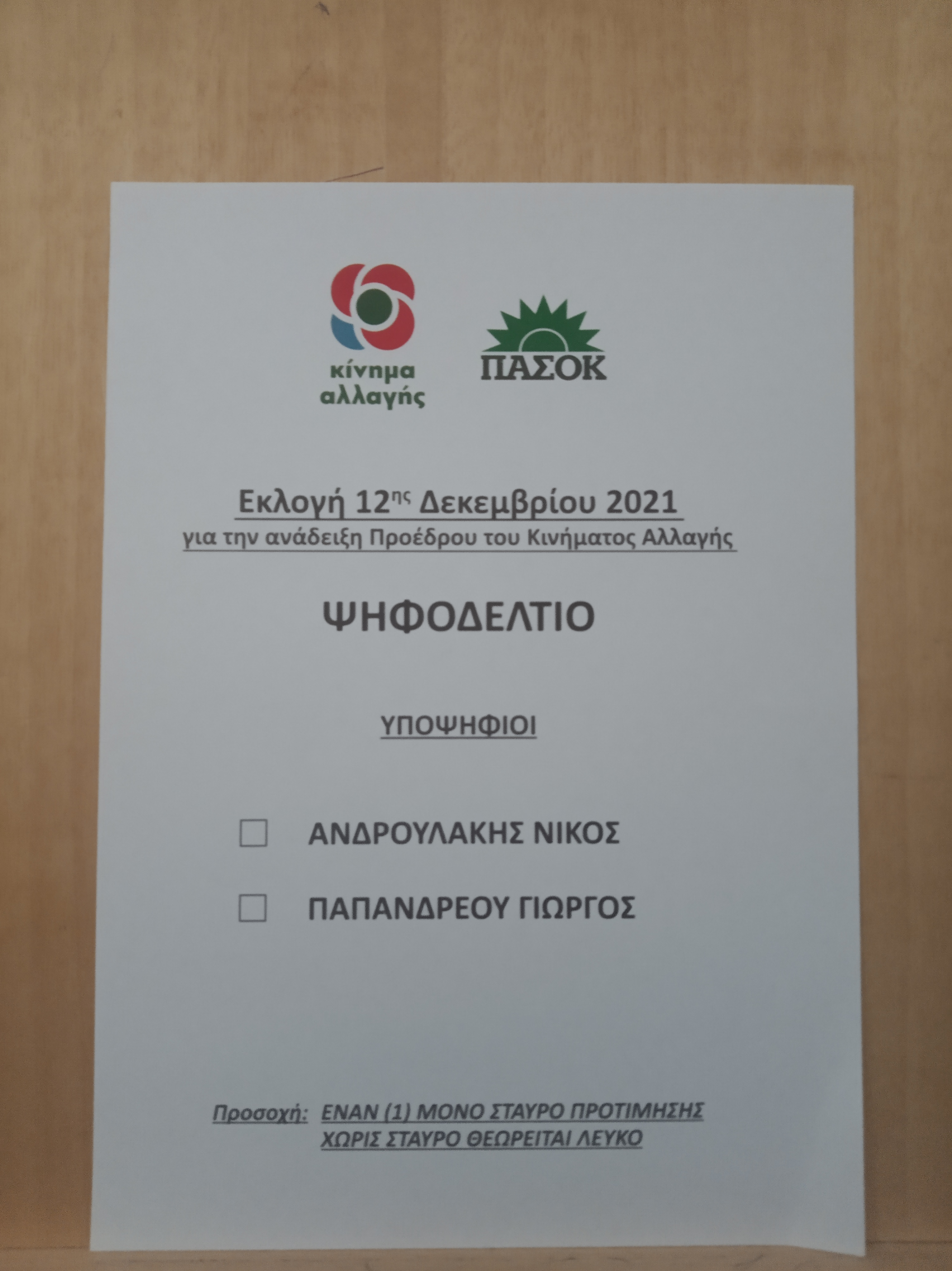
Second round Ballot.

=== Candidates ===
| Candidate | Positions | Declaration |
|---|---|---|
| Nikos Androulakis (46 years old) | President of PASOK (2021-); MP for Thessaloniki A (2023-); Other positions: List: MEP (2014-2023); PASOK Central Committee Secretary (2013-2015) | 18 July 2021 |
| Pavlos Geroulanos (59 years old) | MP for Athens A (2023-today); Other positions: List: Athens Municipal Councillor (2019-2023); Minister of Culture and Tourism (2009-2012); MP for the State (2009-2012) | 14 October 2021 |
| Haris Kastanidis (69 years old) | MP for Thessaloniki A (1981-2012, 2019-2023); Other positions: List: Minister of the Interior (2011); Minister of Justice, Transparency and Human Rights (2009-2011); Minister of Macedonia and Thrace (2003-2004); Minister of Infrastructure and Transport (1996-1997) | 1 September 2021 |
| Andreas Loverdos (69 years old) | MP for Athens B1 (2019-2023); Other positions: List: MP for Athens B (2000-2019); Minister of Education and Religious Affairs (2014-2015); President of Agreement for the New Greece (2013-2014); Minister of Health (2010-2012); Minister of Labour and Social Security (2009-2010); Deputy Minister for Foreign Affairs (2002-2004) | 23 January 2021 |
| George Papandreou (73 years old) | MP for Achaea (1981-1996, 2007-2009, 2012-2014, 2019-today); Other positions: List: President of KIDISO (2015-today); President of Socialist International (2006-2023); MP for Attica (2009-2012); President of PASOK (2004-2012); Prime Minister of Greece (2009-2011); Minister for Foreign Affairs (1999-2004, 2009-2010); MP for Thessaloniki A (2004-2007); MP for Athens A (1996-2004); Deputy Minister for Foreign Affairs (1996-1999); Minister for National Education and Religious Affairs (1988-1989, 1994-1996); Deputy Minister of Culture (1985-1987) | 20 October 2021 |
| Pavlos Christidis (42 years old) | MP for Athens B3 (2023-); PASOK Youth Secretary (2013-today); Other positions: List: Movement for Change Press Representative (2018-2021); PASOK Press Representative (2015-2021); Nafplio Municipal Councillor (2014-2019) | 15 October 2021 |

=== Withdrawn candidates ===
| Candidate | Positions | Declaration | Withdrawal |
|---|---|---|---|
| Fofi Gennimata (56 years old †) | President of KINAL (2017-2021); Other positions: List: President of PASOK (2015-2021); MP for Athens B3 (2019-2021); MP for Athens B (2015-2019); Alternate Minister of National Defence (2013-2015); PASOK Press Representative (2012-2013); Alternate Minister of the Interior (2011-2012); Alternate Minister of Education and Religious Affairs (2010-2011); Deputy Minister of Health and Social Solidarity (2009-2010); Superprefect of Athens - Piraeus (2003-2007); MP for Athens A (2000-2002) | 30 September 2020 | 12 October 2021 |
| Vassilis Kegkeroglou (64 years old) | MP for Heraklion (2004-2023); Other positions: List: Secretary of the Parliamentary group of Movement for Change (2015-today); Deputy Minister of Labour, Social Security and Welfare (2013-2015) | 14 October 2021 | 21 October 2021 (backed Papandreou) |

== Debate ==
| Date and time | Channel | Moderator | Rating | P Present A Absent N Non-invitee | | | | | | |
| Date and time | Channel | Moderator | Rating | Androulakis | Geroulanos | Kastanidis | Loverdos | Papandreou | Christidis | References |
|---|---|---|---|---|---|---|---|---|---|---|
| 29 Nov, 22:00 | ERT1 | Antrianna Paraskevopoulou | 8,20% | P | P | P | P | A | P | |

== Opinion polling ==
| Source | Date | Androulakis | Gennimata† | Geroulanos | Kastanidis | Loverdos | Papandreou | Christidis | Other | DK/DA | Lead |
|---|---|---|---|---|---|---|---|---|---|---|---|
| Second round | 12 Dec | 67.2 | – | – | – | – | 32.2 | – | – | – | 35.0 |
| Interview | 9 Dec | 56.6 | – | – | – | – | 40.0 | – | – | – | 16.6 |
| First round | 5 Dec | 36.9 | – | 3.0 | 2.9 | 26.0 | 28.0 | 3.3 | – | – | 8.9 |
| GPO | 27 Nov | 28,10 | - | 3,30 | 2,90 | 30,10 | 27,60 | 4,10 | - | - | 2,00 |
| Pulse | 26 Nov | 28,00 | - | 2,00 | 5,00 | 30,00 | 29,00 | 5,00 | - | 1,00 | 1,00 |
| Metron Analysis | 25 Nov | 29,00 | - | 8,00 | 8,00 | 27,00 | 22,00 | 4,00 | - | 2,00 | 2,00 |
| Alco | 22 Nov | 33,00 | - | 3,00 | 3,00 | 32,00 | 24,00 | 2,00 | - | 3,00 | 1,00 |
| Marc | 21 Nov | 31,70 | - | 2,00 | 2,50 | 31,10 | 25,20 | 1,80 | - | - | 0,60 |
| MRB | 18 Nov | 29,50 | - | 2,20 | 7,30 | 30,30 | 27,90 | 1,40 | - | 1,30 | 0,80 |
| Interview | 17 Nov | 26,40 | - | 4,80 | 5,00 | 27,10 | 23,50 | 3,50 | - | 9,70 | 0,70 |
| Marc | 15 Nov | 26,10 | - | 3,20 | 5,60 | 29,50 | 25,90 | 3,50 | - | 6,10 | 3,40 |
| Metron Analysis | 15 Nov | 26,00 | - | 4,00 | 6,00 | 26,00 | 23,00 | 5,00 | - | - | 0,00 |
| GPO | 13 Nov | 24,70 | - | 4,30 | 4,10 | 28,80 | 25,20 | 6,20 | - | - | 3,60 |
| Opinion Poll | 9 Nov | 28,20 | - | 2,80 | 7,00 | 31,60 | 21,60 | 3,50 | - | 5,3 | 3,40 |
| GPO | 6 Nov | 25,40 | - | 4,30 | 3,70 | 27,20 | 25,80 | 6,20 | - | 7,40 | 1,40 |
| Interview | 25 Oct | 32,40 | - | 12,70 | 5,30 | 17,40 | 29,20 | 1,20 | - | 1,80 | 3,20 |
| To the point | 12 Jul | 32,50 | 16,60 | 3,80 | 5,00 | 33,80 | - | - | 0,00 | 5,30 | 1,30 |
| MRB | 8 Jul | 15,90 | 56,70 | - | - | 24,30 | - | - | 0,00 | 3,00 | 32,40 |
| Opinion Poll | 31 May | 22,00 | 19,70 | 9,10 | 3,80 | 37,10 | - | - | 2,30 | 6,10 | 15,10 |
| Opinion Poll | 24 Feb | 26,92 | 16,67 | 6,79 | - | 39,74 | - | - | 7,31 | 2,56 | 12,82 |
| Opinion Poll | 18 Nov 2020 | 26,70 | 21,00 | 8,00 | - | 25,30 | - | - | 13,00 | 6,00 | 1,40 |

== Results ==
Results map of the first round by region.

Results map of the second round by region.

Summary of the 2021 Movement for Change leadership election results
| Candidates | Party | First round | | Second round | |
| Candidates | Party | Votes | % | Votes | % |
|---|---|---|---|---|---|
| Nikos Androulakis | PASOK | 99,120 | 36.88 | 139,492 | 67.17 |
| George Papandreou | KIDISO | 75,183 | 27.97 | 66,847 | 32.19 |
| Andreas Loverdos | PASOK | 69,827 | 25.98 | | |
| Pavlos Christidis | PASOK | 8,733 | 3.25 | | |
| Pavlos Geroulanos | PASOK | 8,027 | 2.99 | | |
| Haris Kastanidis | KIDISO | 7,908 | 2.94 | | |
| Valid votes | | 268,798 | 99.30 | 206,339 | 99.36 |
| Blank / invalid votes | | 1,908 | 0.70 | 1,319 | 0.64 |
| Total | | 270,706 | | 207,658 | |
Source: Κίνημα Αλλαγής - Αποτελέσματα Α΄ Γύρου Κίνημα Αλλαγής - Αποτελέσματα Β΄ Γύρου

=== By Region ===
==== First Round ====
| Region | Votes | Valid votes | Blank votes | Invalid votes | Androulakis | Geroulanos | Kastanidis | Loverdos | Papandreou | Christidis |
|---|---|---|---|---|---|---|---|---|---|---|
| Attica | 78,721 | 77,906 | 141 | 674 | 21795 (27.69%) | 3521 (4.47%) | 1374 (1.74%) | 25939 (32.95%) | 22880 (29.06%) | 2397 (3.04%) |
| Central Greece | 12,798 | 12,751 | 13 | 34 | 4649 (36.33%) | 282 (2.20%) | 224 (1.75%) | 3611 (28.22%) | 3632 (28.38%) | 353 (2.76%) |
| Central Macedonia | 39,807 | 39,573 | 51 | 183 | 14529 (36.50%) | 770 (1.93%) | 3381 (8.49%) | 11032 (27.71%) | 8760 (22.01%) | 1101 (2.77%) |
| Crete | 30,300 | 30,091 | 47 | 162 | 18579 (61.32%) | 283 (0.93%) | 274 (0.90%) | 3076 (10.15%) | 7257 (23.95%) | 622 (2.05%) |
| Eastern Macedonia and Thrace | 12,741 | 12,672 | 24 | 45 | 4677 (36.71%) | 367 (2.88%) | 469 (3.68%) | 3519 (27.62%) | 3069 (24.09%) | 571 (4.48%) |
| Epirus | 10,521 | 10,475 | 15 | 31 | 3969 (37.72%) | 346 (3.29%) | 180 (1.71%) | 2153 (20.46%) | 3424 (32.54%) | 403 (3.83%) |
| Ionian Islands | 5,533 | 5,473 | 9 | 51 | 1819 (32.88%) | 422 (7.63%) | 109 (1.97%) | 1436 (25.95%) | 1509 (27.27%) | 178 (3.22%) |
| North Aegean | 4,348 | 4,329 | 8 | 11 | 1527 (35.11%) | 63 (1.45%) | 75 (1.72%) | 1497 (34.43%) | 909 (20.91%) | 258 (5.93%) |
| Peloponnese | 17,728 | 17,628 | 36 | 64 | 6286 (35.46%) | 330 (1.86%) | 232 (1.31%) | 4800 (27.08%) | 4915 (27.72%) | 1065 (6.01%) |
| South Aegean | 7,770 | 7,745 | 4 | 21 | 3072 (39.54%) | 129 (1.66%) | 82 (1.05%) | 2060 (26.51%) | 2041 (26.27%) | 361 (4.65%) |
| Thessaly | 16,276 | 16,192 | 23 | 61 | 5882 (36.14%) | 878 (5.39%) | 299 (1.84%) | 3743 (23.00%) | 4791 (29.44%) | 599 (3.68%) |
| Western Greece | 24,098 | 23,944 | 47 | 107 | 8279 (34.35%) | 439 (1.82%) | 396 (1.64%) | 5260 (21.83%) | 9076 (37.66%) | 494 (2.05%) |
| Western Macedonia | 7,596 | 7,568 | 14 | 14 | 3368 (44.34%) | 116 (1.53%) | 729 (9.60%) | 1285 (16.92%) | 1830 (24.09%) | 240 (3.16%) |
| International | 2,469 | 2,451 | 4 | 14 | 689 (27.91%) | 81 (3.28%) | 84 (3.40%) | 416 (16.85%) | 1090 (44.15%) | 91 (3.69%) |

==== Second Round ====
| Region | Votes | Valid votes | Blank votes | Invalid votes | Androulakis | Papandreou |
|---|---|---|---|---|---|---|
| Attica | 59,165 | 58,691 | 168 | 306 | 37778 (64.37%) | 20913 (35.63%) |
| Central Greece | 9,061 | 9,023 | 19 | 19 | 6142 (68.07%) | 2881 (31.92%) |
| Central Macedonia | 30,065 | 29,859 | 95 | 111 | 21683 (72.61%) | 8176 (27.38%) |
| Crete | 23,608 | 23,456 | 55 | 97 | 17948 (76.52%) | 5508 (23.48%) |
| Eastern Macedonia and Thrace | 9,565 | 9,506 | 24 | 35 | 6830 (71,85%) | 2676 (28.15%) |
| Epirus | 8,016 | 7,977 | 19 | 20 | 5045 (63.24%) | 2932 (36.76%) |
| Ionian Islands | 3,988 | 3,968 | 8 | 12 | 2685 (67.67%) | 1283 (32.33%) |
| North Aegean | 3,481 | 3,452 | 16 | 13 | 2583 (74.83%) | 869 (25.17%) |
| Peloponnese | 12,838 | 12,784 | 22 | 32 | 8575 (67.08%) | 4209 (32.92%) |
| South Aegean | 5,749 | 5,726 | 11 | 12 | 4122 (71.99%) | 1604 (28.01%) |
| Thessaly | 12,236 | 12,167 | 27 | 42 | 7929 (65.17%) | 4238 (34.83%) |
| Western Greece | 17,914 | 17,833 | 40 | 41 | 10229 (57.36%) | 7604 (42.64%) |
| Western Macedonia | 5,985 | 5,951 | 18 | 16 | 4247 (71.37%) | 1704 (28.63%) |
| International | 1,662 | 1,656 | 2 | 4 | 817 (49.34%) | 839 (50.66%) |
