= 2024 PASOK – KINAL leadership election =

Greek political coalition leadership race

2024 PASOK – Movement for Change leadership election
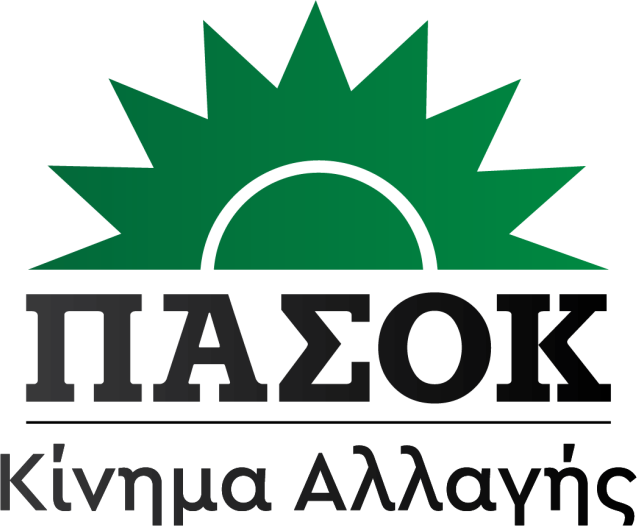
- 6 October 2024 (first round); 13 October 2024 (second round)
- Turnout: 303,223 (first round); 213,001 (second round)
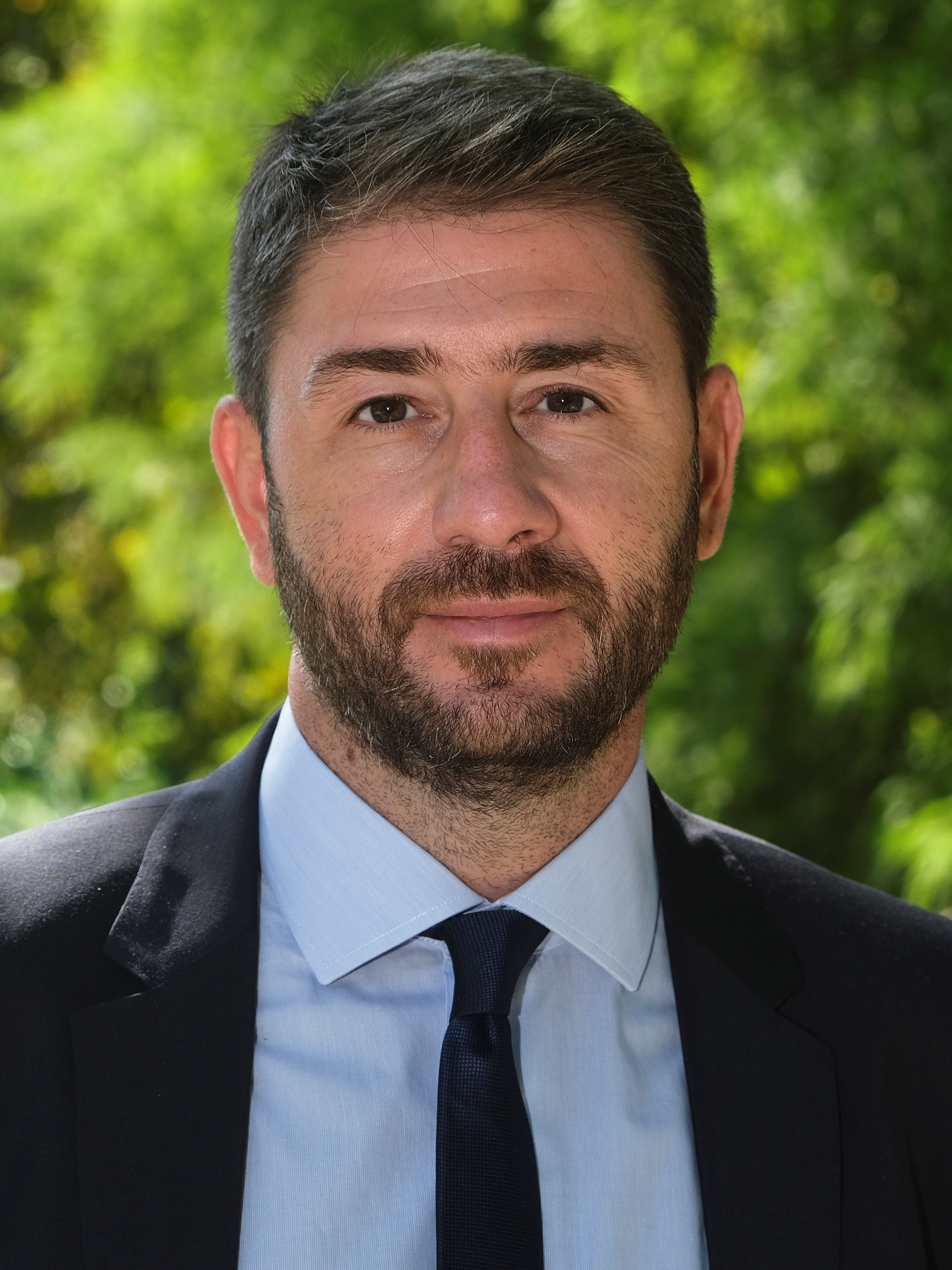

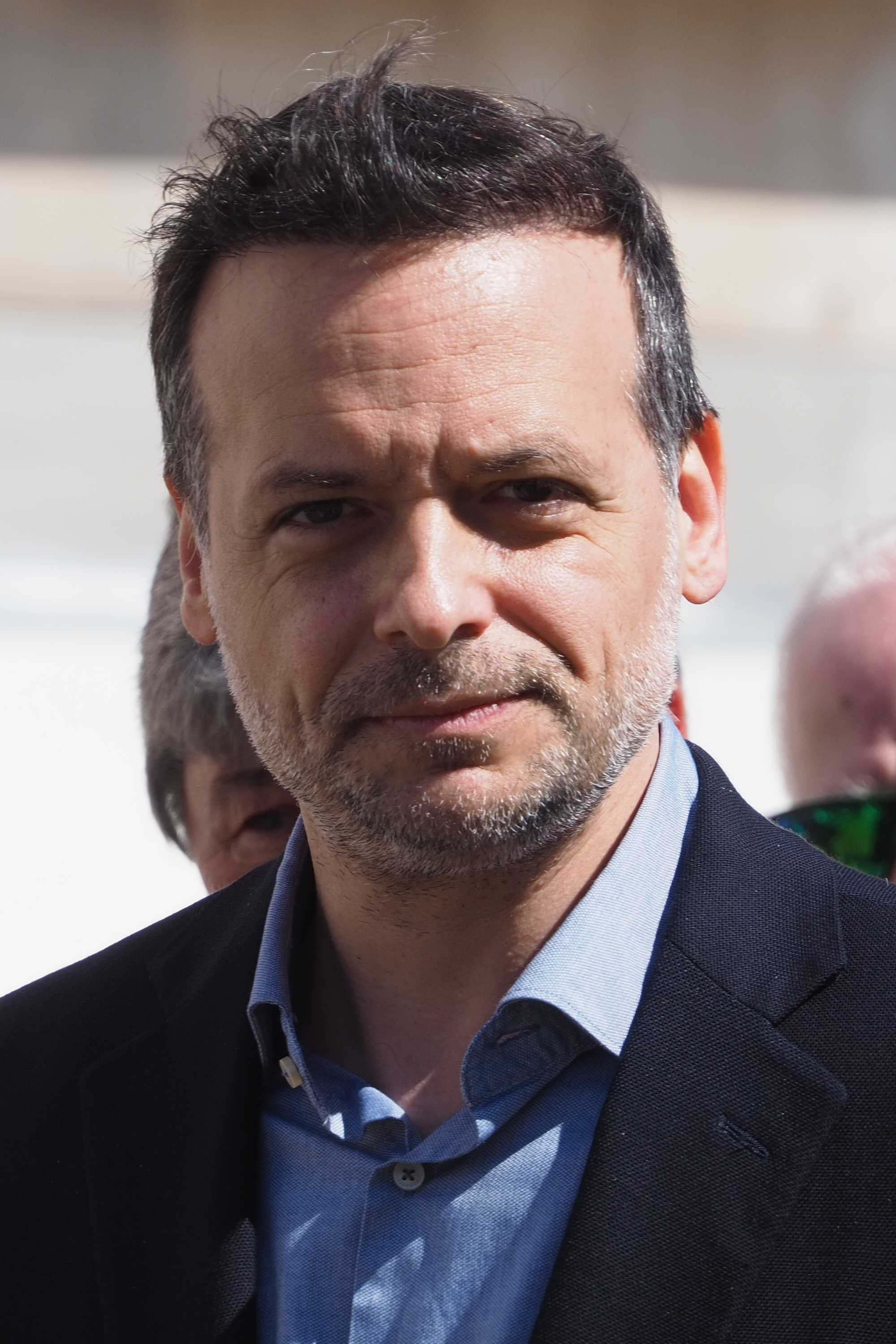

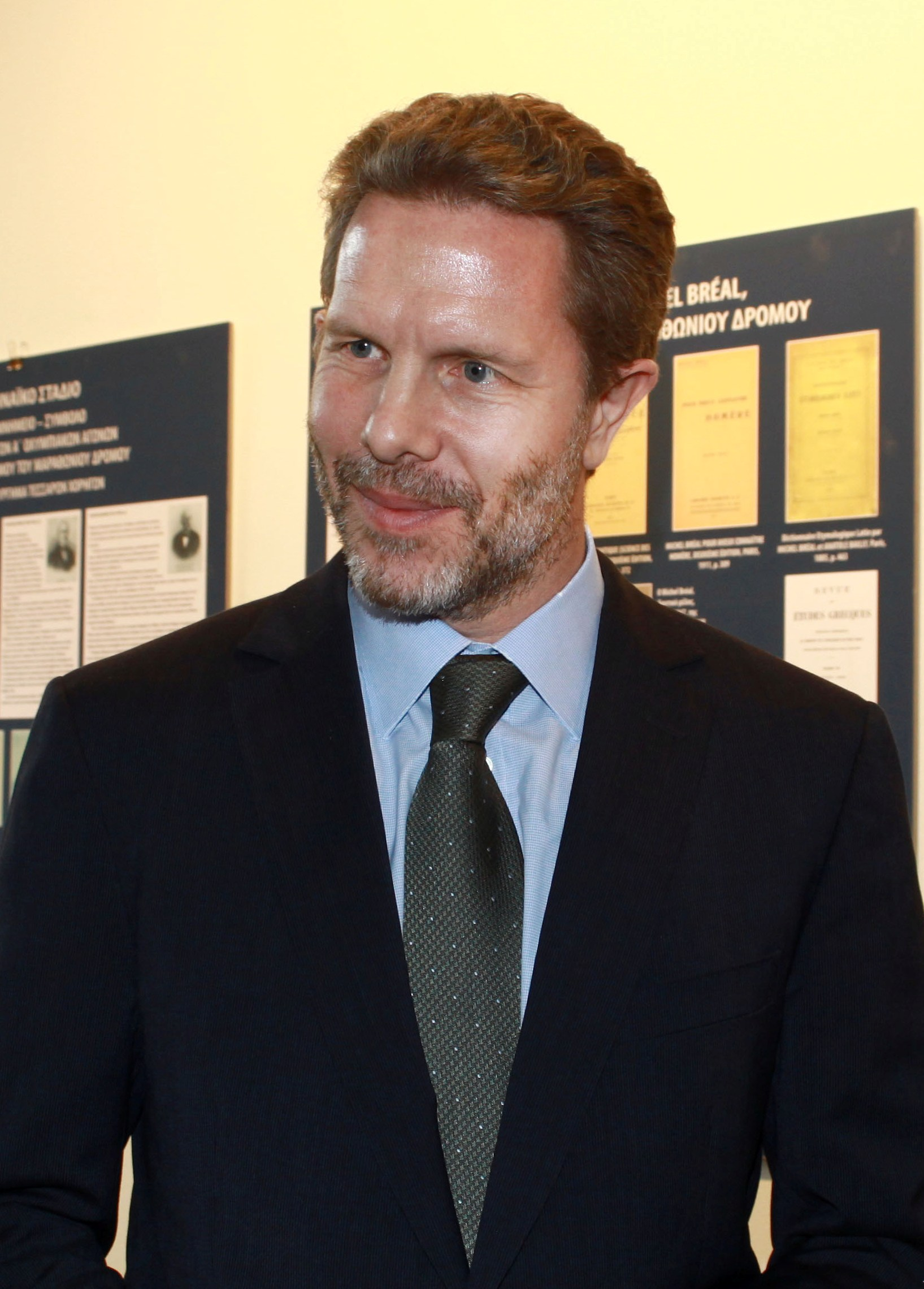

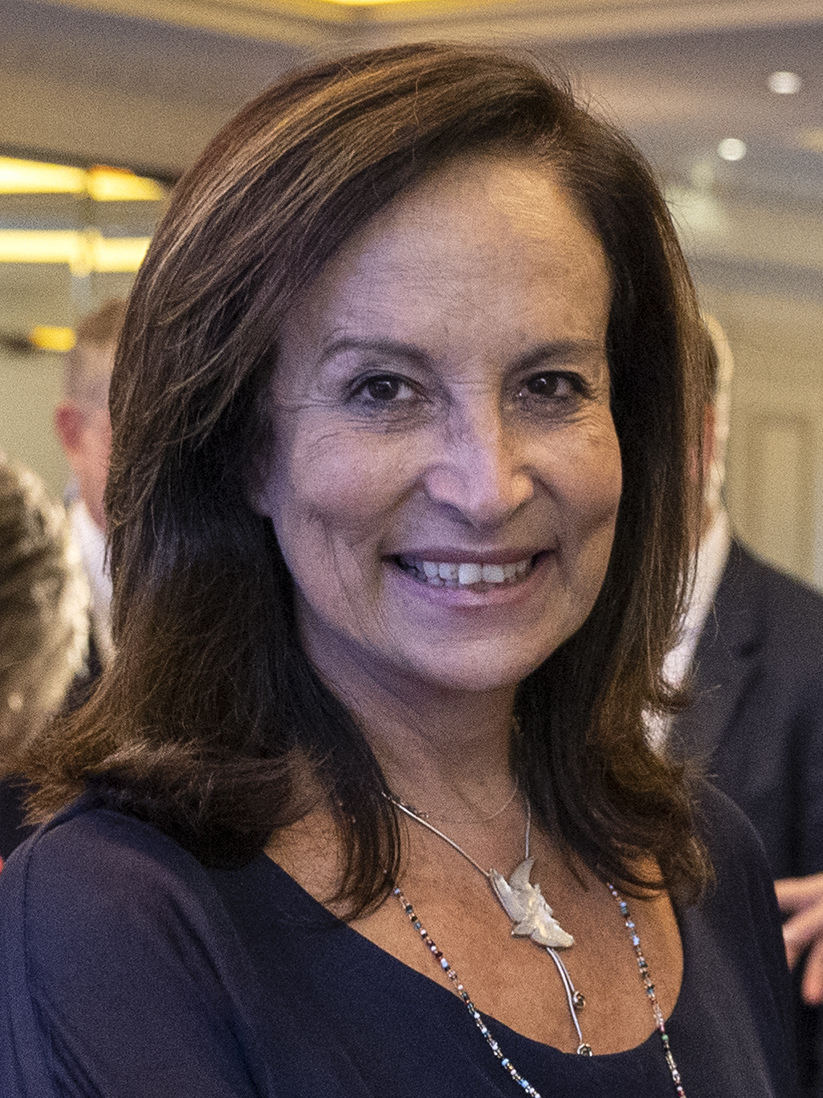
Candidate	Nikos Androulakis	Haris Doukas
First round	89,288 (29.6%)	64,490 (21.4%)
Second round	125,820 (59.9%)	84,149 (40.1%)
Candidate	Pavlos Geroulanos	Anna Diamantopoulou
First round	63,632 (21.1%)	58,809 (19.5%)
Second round	Eliminated	Eliminated
President of
PASOK – KINAL before election
Nikos Androulakis
Elected President of
PASOK – KINAL
Nikos Androulakis

The 2024 PASOK – Movement for Change leadership election took place on the 6th of October 2024, with a second round on the 13th of the same month, in order to elect the president of PASOK – Movement for Change.

It was triggered on June 30, following internal pressure on the incumbent President Nikos Androulakis, regarding the coalition's mediocre performance at the 2024 EU elections.

Six candidates stood: Nikos Androulakis, Pavlos Geroulanos, Nadia Giannakopoulou, Anna Diamantopoulou, Haris Doukas, and Michalis Katrinis.

Androulakis came first in the first round, and beat Doukas in the second round with almost 60% of the vote. As such, he was re-elected leader.

== Background ==
=== Previous leadership election ===
Back in December 2021, leadership elections for KINAL took place in order to succeed Fofi Gennimata to the leadership of KINAL after her first term. She herself ran for a second term, but withdrew due to health issues and subsequently passed away on October 25th. The other candidates were Nikos Androulakis, George Papandreou, Andreas Loverdos, Pavlos Christidis, Pavlos Geroulanos, and Haris Kastanidis. The first two made it to the runoff, where Androulakis won with 139.492 votes and 67,17% of the vote, against 66.847 votes and 32,19% of the vote that Papandreou gathered.

=== 2022-2023 ===
In May 2022, in an internal referendum, it was decided to rename the coalition to “PASOK – Movement for Change” and ¬to bring back the green rising sun, the famous historic emblem of PASOK. In the same month the 3rd Congress of the party was held. Changes were made to the statute, and its work was concluded with the election of the members of the Central Political Committee.

In the May elections, PASOK – KINAL received 11,46% of the voted and elected 41 MPs. As no party had reached an absolute majority, and there was no means to form a coalition government, as a Proportional Representation system was in place at the time, a caretaker government was formed, and fresh elections were called. In the June elections the party's percentage slightly rose to 11,84%, electing 32 MPs. As of this moment, it is the third largest parliamentary force. A few days after the elections, Andreas Loverdos, a historical senior member of the party, and twice a candidate for the leadership, (2015, 2021), resigned from the party, citing political reasons.

=== 2024 ===
Before the European Parliament elections, Androulakis had set as a target for PASOK to become the second party with a percentage higher than the 2019 EU elections (7,72%) and the legislative ones in 2023 (11,46% and 11,84% in May and in June). After the EU elections, where PASOK reached third place with a percentage of 12,79%, electing 3 MEPs, MPs and senior members declared their disappointment towards the electoral result, criticizing Androulakis's policy, blaming him for the result and raising the issue of leadership.

Manolis Christodoulakis, who also raised the issue of leadership, and was a prominent person to jump into the race for the leadership, in the end backed Haris Doukas in a Video posted to his social media, along with an appropriate article.

Although Androulakis stated that he would not go into early leadership elections, waiting for the planned (according to the statute) elections in October 2025, on the meeting of the Central Political Committee of the party on June 30, proposed (and were later accepted by the CPC) elections on 6 October, with a runoff a week later, on 13 October.

The same day, in speeches to the meeting of the CPC, Haris Doukas, the Mayor of Athens, and former minister and MP for Athens A, Pavlos Geroulanos, both announced their candidacies.

The next day, MP for Athens B1, Milena Apostolaki, and MP for Elis, Michalis Katrinis, also announced their candidacies.

On July 3, MP for Athens B2 Nadia Giannakopoulou, and the journalist and war correspondent Yannis Kanellakis, also announced their candidacies.

On July 16, former European Commissioner for Employment, Social Affairs and Inclusion, Anna Diamantopoulou, declared her candidacy in a video post.

On July 24, Milena Apostolaki withdrew her candidacy.

On September 9, the required signatures of the candidates were submitted and the nominations of six candidates were formalised. Yannis Kanellakis was left out of the race, who noted in a letter that he had the 5,000 signatures of members, but did not submit them to the relevant committee to protect their personal information.

== Candidates ==
Candidate	Political experience	Announcement	Ref.
Nikos Androulakis (age 45)	President of PASOK – Movement for Change (2021–present); MP for Thessaloniki A (2023–present); Other positions: List: Member of the European Parliament for Greece (2014–2023); PASOK Central Committee Secretary (2013–2015)	30 June 2024	
Nikos Androulakis (age 45)	Endorsementsː List: Giannis Maniatis, Member of the European Parliament; Dimitris Mantzos, MP for the Nationwide list; Panagiotis Doudonis, MP for the Nationwide list; Ekaterini Kazani, MP of Euboea; Francis Parasyris, MP of Heraklion; Giannis Tsimaris, MP of Ioannina; Giorgos Mulkiotis, MP of Boeotia; Manolis Hnaris, MP of Rethymno; Tasos Nicolaides, MP of Drama; Apostolos Kaklamanis, former Speaker of the Hellenic Parliament, former Minister and former Member of Parliament; Andreas Spyropoulos, Secretary of the Central Political Committee; Thanasis Glavinas, Press Spokesman of PASOK-Movement for Change; Tasoula Hatzidaki, Secretary of the PASOK-Movement for Change	30 June 2024	
Haris Doukas (age 44)	Mayor of Athens (2024–present)	30 June 2024	
Haris Doukas (age 44)	Endorsementsː List: Manolis Christodoulakis, MP for East Attica; Odysseas Konstantinopoulos, MP for Arcadia; Apostolos Panas, MP for Chalkidiki; Christina Staraka, MP for Aetolia-Acarnania; Andreas Poulas, MP for Argolis; Ilchan Achmet, MP for Rhodope; Katerina Batzeli, former Minister; Petros Efthymiou, former Minister; Christos Protopapas, former Minister; Dimitris Reppas, former Minister; Filippos Sachinidis, former Minister; Kostas Skandalidis, former Minister; Tonia Antoniou, former MP; Michalis Tzelepis, former MP; Theodoros Margaritis, Secretary of the “Renewing Left”; Theodoros Margaritis, Head of “Forward”	30 June 2024	
Pavlos Geroulanos (age 58)	MP for Athens A (2023–present); Other positions: List: Athens Municipal Councillor (2019–2023); Minister of Culture and Tourism (2009–2012); MP for the Nationwide list (2009–2012)	30 June 2024	
Pavlos Geroulanos (age 58)	Endorsementsː List: Nikos Papandreou, MEP; Sakis Arnaoutoglou, MEP; Giorgos Anomeritis, former Minister; Konstantinos Papagiannakis, General Secretary of EDEM	30 June 2024	
Michalis Katrinis (age 49)	MP for Elis (2007–2012, 2019–present); Leader of PASOK–KINAL in the Hellenic Parliament (2021–2023)	1 July 2024	
Michalis Katrinis (age 49)	Endorsementsː	1 July 2024	
Nadia Giannakopoulou (age 46)	MP for Athens B2 (2019–present); MP for Messenia (2007–2012)	3 July 2024	
Nadia Giannakopoulou (age 46)	Endorsementsː	3 July 2024	
Anna Diamantopoulou (age 65)	European Commissioner for Employment and Social Affairs (1999–2004); Other positions: List: Minister of Education (2009–2012); Minister of Development, Competition, and Shipping (2012); Deputy Minister of Development (1996–1999); MP for Athens A (2007–2009); MP for the Nationwide list (2004–2007); MP for Kozani (1996–1999); Prefect of Kastoria (1985–1986)	16 July 2024	
Anna Diamantopoulou (age 65)	Endorsementsː List: Evangelia Liakouli, MP for Larissa; Paris Koukoulopoulos, MP for Kozani; Spyros Vougias, President of the Municipal Council of Thessaloniki, former Deputy Minister and former MP for Thessaloniki A; Kostas Spiliopoulos, former Deputy Minister and former MP for Achaea; Hara Kefalidou, former MP for Drama; Giorgos Kaminis, former MP for the Nationwide list and former Mayor of Athens; Yiannis Meimaroglou, Member of the Executive Council of PASOK; Giorgos Lazouras, former Mayor of Kalavryta; Evangelia Schinaraki-Iliaki, former MP of Heraklion	16 July 2024	

=== Withdrawn/Rejected Candidates ===
Candidate	Political experience	Announcement	Withdrawal/ rejection	Ref.
Milena Apostolaki (age 59)	MP for Athens B1 (2023–present); Other positions: List: Deputy Minister of Agricultural and Food Development (2010–2011); Deputy Minister of Development (2000–2001); MP for Athens B (2000, 2004–2012)	1 July 2024	24 July 2024	
Yannis Kanellakis (Note: Kanellakis did not present the necessary signatures for his official participation in the ballots for the elections, which blocked his participation in the ballots. He had previously mentioned doing that.)	None	3 July 2024	9 September 2024	

== Opinion polling ==
The results of the polls are listed in the table below in reverse chronological order, showing the most recent first, using the date of publication. Polls show data collected by polling companies among PASOK - Movement for Change voters/supporters and the general population as well.

Poll conducted on PASOK – KINAL voters
Poll conducted on those who will vote on the leadership election / the general population

=== First round ===
Fieldwork Date	Polling firm									Other	DK/DA	Undecided	Lead
Fieldwork Date	Polling firm	Androulakis	Geroulanos	Giannakopoulou	Diamantopoulou	Doukas	Katrinis	Kanellakis	Apostolaki	Other	DK/DA	Undecided	Lead
4 Oct 2024	Metron Analysis	36.0	16.0	5.0	17.0	19.0	3.0	–	–	–	4.0	–	17.0
4 Oct 2024	Metron Analysis	27.0	20.0	4.0	24.0	20.0	2.0	–	–	–	3.0	–	3.0
3 Oct 2024	MRB	27.3	17.9	2.5	16.9	25.7	3.4	–	–	–	–	6.3	1.6
3 Oct 2024	Interview	29.4	19.2	2.7	12.6	29.6	3.7	–	–	–	2.8	–	0.2
30 Sep 2024	Opinion Poll	32.2	15.2	3.3	15	30.7	2.7	–	–	–	0.8	–	1.5
30 Sep 2024	Opinion Poll	26.5	15.8	4.6	18.1	25.8	5.2	–	–	–	3.7	0.3	0.7
26 Sep 2024	Metron Analysis	42.0	9.0	2.0	16	23.0	2.0	–	–	–	2.0	–	19
26 Sep 2024	Metron Analysis	31.0	12.0	3.0	24.0	22.0	3.0	–	–	1.0	–	4.0	7.0
25 Sep 2024	Prorata	26.0	15.0	3.0	21.0	22.0	4.0	–	–	–	9.0		4.0
24 Sep 2024	Interview	28.1	15.8	4.1	15.1	28.9	5.5	–	–	–	–	2.5	0.8
21 Sep 2024	GPO	33.8	15.4	1.8	22.3	22.0	2.2	–	–	–	0.2	2.3	11.5
19 Sep 2024	MRB	26.7	13.5	4.1	18.1	23.0	4.5	–	–	–	–	10.1 (Note: Labeled as "unspecified vote")	3.7
16 Sep 2024	Alco	28.7	9.4	3.3	17.2	23.1	4.4	–	–	–	–	13.7	5.6
14 Sep 2024	Metron Analysis	38.0	11.0	2.0	14.0	25.0	1.0	–	–	–	8.0	–	13.0
14 Sep 2024	Metron Analysis	28.0	16.0	4.0	25.0	23.0	3.0	–	–	–	1.0	–	3.0
12 Sep 2024	RealPolls	28.5	17.4	3.8	16.3	24.9	3.9	0.4	–	–	0.1	4.6	3.6
12 Sep 2024	RealPolls	25.6	18.5	3.8	19.4	23.0	3.7	0.6	–	–	0.1	5.4	2.6
10 Sep 2024	Interview	21.1	16.5	2.2	18.6	27.6	11.0	1.0	–	–	–	2.0	6.5
9 Sep 2024	Certification of the candidacies												
3 Sep 2024	Opinion Poll	29.2	14.8	3.3	15.4	26.4	3.3	1.9	–	–	0.9	4.7	2.8
3 Sep 2024	Opinion Poll	20.3	14.8	5.6	19.0	23.7	4.8	2.0	–	–	3.0	6.9	3.4
2 Sep 2024	MRB	25.5	12.6	4.9	17.5	21.9	3.3	0.9	–	8.8	–	12.7 (Note: Labeled as "unspecified vote")	3.6
27 Aug 2024	Interview	22.7	17.4	3.3	18.4	26.3	8.5	0.5	–	8.8	–	2.9	3.6
8 Jul 2024	Prorata	33.0	21.0	–	–	21.0	3.0	–	5.0	11.0	6.0	–	12.0
6 Jul 2024	GPO	39.4	19.9	–	–	22.3	5.0	–	7.9	–	–	–	17.1
2 Jul 2024	To The Point	41.7	20.5	–	–	22.8	–	–	–	15.0 (Note: Manolis Christodoulakis)	–	–	18.9
30 Jun 2024	Elections declared												
28 Jun 2024	Interview	20.9	18.4	–	–	21.5	–	–	–	23.6 (Note: Manolis Christodoulakis is included in the percentage with 13,7%.)	3.7	11.9	0.6

=== Second round ===
==== Androulakis vs. Doukas ====
Fieldwork Date	Polling firm			Undecided	N/NV	DK/DA
Fieldwork Date	Polling firm	Androulakis	Doukas	Undecided	N/NV	DK/DA
4 Oct 2024	Metron Analysis	58.0	35.0	-	-	-
4 Oct 2024	Metron Analysis	50.0	38.0	-	-	-
30 Sep 2024	Opinion Poll	46.3	43.0	4.3	6.4	-
30 Sep 2024	Opinion Poll	43.7	43.1	8.8	3.3	1.0
26 Sep 2024	Metron Analysis	60.0	33.0	-	-	-
26 Sep 2024	Metron Analysis	53.0	38.0	-	-	-
25 Sep 2024	Prorata	45.0	39.0	-	6.0	10.0
24 Sep 2024	Interview	39.8	40.8	11.9	7.5	
21 Sep 2024	GPO	51.3	38.5	5.5	4.5	0.2
19 Sep 2024	MRB	44.6	44.1	–	5.8	5.5
16 Sep 2024	Alco	43.8	33.1	23.1	–	–
12 Sep 2024	RealPolls	41.0	41.0	14.0	–	4.0
10 Sep 2024	Interview	33.5	44.4	13.5	8.6	
3 Sep 2024	Opinion Poll	42.9	45.7	9.2	5.6	2.0
3 Sep 2024	Opinion Poll	39.0	44.3	5.7	4.8	1.0
2 Sep 2024	MRB	41.5	39.5	–	12.7	6.4
8 Jul 2024	GPO	49.9	36.5	8.0	4.9	0.7

==== Other scenarios ====
Hypothetical Polling

==== Androulakis vs. Diamantopoulou ====
Fieldwork Date	Polling firm			Undecided	N/NV	DK/DA
Fieldwork Date	Polling firm	Androulakis	Diamantopoulou	Undecided	N/NV	DK/DA
Metron Analysis	4 Oct	56.0	34.0	-	-	-
Metron Analysis	4 Oct	46.0	40.0	-	-	-
Metron Analysis	26 Sep	62.0	29.0	-	-	-
Metron Analysis	26 Sep	52.0	38.0	-	-	-
Prorata	25 Sep	44.0	38.0	-	9.0	9.0
GPO	21 Sep	51.1	39.6	5.5	3.3	0.5
MRB	19 Sep	59.1	28.6	–	9.5	2.8
Alco	16 Sep	44.0	34.1	24.6	–	–
Interview	10 Sep	41.9	26.3	12.8	19.0	
Opinion Poll	3 Sep	53.4	35.9	5.8	2.9	1.9
Opinion Poll	3 Sep	41.5	43.1	4.2	7.8	3.3
MRB	2 Sep	47.7	31.5	–	13.9	7.0

==== Androulakis vs. Geroulanos ====
Fieldwork Date	Polling firm			Undecided	N/NV	DK/DA
Fieldwork Date	Polling firm	Androulakis	Geroulanos	Undecided	N/NV	DK/DA
Metron Analysis	4 Oct	54.0	37.0	-	-	-
Metron Analysis	4 Oct	41.0	47.0	-	-	-
Metron Analysis	26 Sep	62.0	28.0	-	-	-
Metron Analysis	26 Sep	45.0	45.0	-	-	-
Prorata	25 Sep	48.0	37.0	-	6.0	9.0
Interview	24 Sep	39.5	40.9	12.5	7.1	
GPO	21 Sep	53.8	37.0	5.3	3.5	0.4
MRB	19 Sep	54.5	37.0	–	6.1	2.4
Alco	16 Sep	46.8	27.7	25.5	–	–
Interview	10 Sep	28.6	45.2	12.9	13.3	
Opinion Poll	3 Sep	47.8	33.6	–	12.2	6.3
GPO	8 Jul	53.3	31.0	11.1	3.7	0.9

==== Diamantopoulou vs. Doukas ====
Fieldwork Date	Polling firm			Undecided	N/NV	DK/DA
Fieldwork Date	Polling firm	Diamantopoulou	Doukas	Undecided	N/NV	DK/DA
Metron Analysis	4 Oct	43.0	44.0	-	-	-
Metron Analysis	4 Oct	44.0	43.0	-	-	-
Metron Analysis	26 Sep	46.0	44.0	-	-	-
Metron Analysis	26 Sep	41.0	45.0	-	-	-

==== Diamantopoulou vs. Geroulanos ====
Fieldwork Date	Polling firm			Undecided	N/NV	DK/DA
Fieldwork Date	Polling firm	Diamantopoulou	Geroulanos	Undecided	N/NV	DK/DA
Metron Analysis	4 Oct	38.0	43.0	-	-	-
Metron Analysis	4 Oct	39.0	45.0	-	-	-

==== Doukas vs. Geroulanos ====
Fieldwork Date	Polling firm			Undecided	N/NV	DK/DA
Fieldwork Date	Polling firm	Doukas	Geroulanos	Undecided	N/NV	DK/DA
Metron Analysis	4 Oct	39.0	42.0	-	-	-
Metron Analysis	4 Oct	38.0	48.0	-	-	-
Metron Analysis	26 Sep	47.0	41.0	-	-	-
Metron Analysis	26 Sep	43.0	44.0	-	-	-
GPO	8 Jul	39.2	35.0	13.8	9.9	2.1

== Results ==
Summary of the results of the 2024 PASOK – KINAL leadership election
Candidate	First round		Second Round	
Candidate	Votes	%	Votes	%
Nikos Androulakis	89,288	29.64	125,820	59.92
Haris Doukas	64,490	21.41	84,149	40.08
Pavlos Geroulanos	63,632	21.12		
Anna Diamantopoulou	58,809	19.52		
Michalis Katrinis	18,163	6.03		
Nadia Giannakopoulou	6,890	2.29		
Valid votes	301,272	99.35	209,969	98.57
Blank / Invalid votes	1,951	0.65	3,032	1.43
Total votes	303,223	100	213,001	100
Source: PASOK – KINAL - First Round Results PASOK – KINAL - Second Round Results
