= Milena Apostolaki =

Greek politician

Milena Apostolaki MP
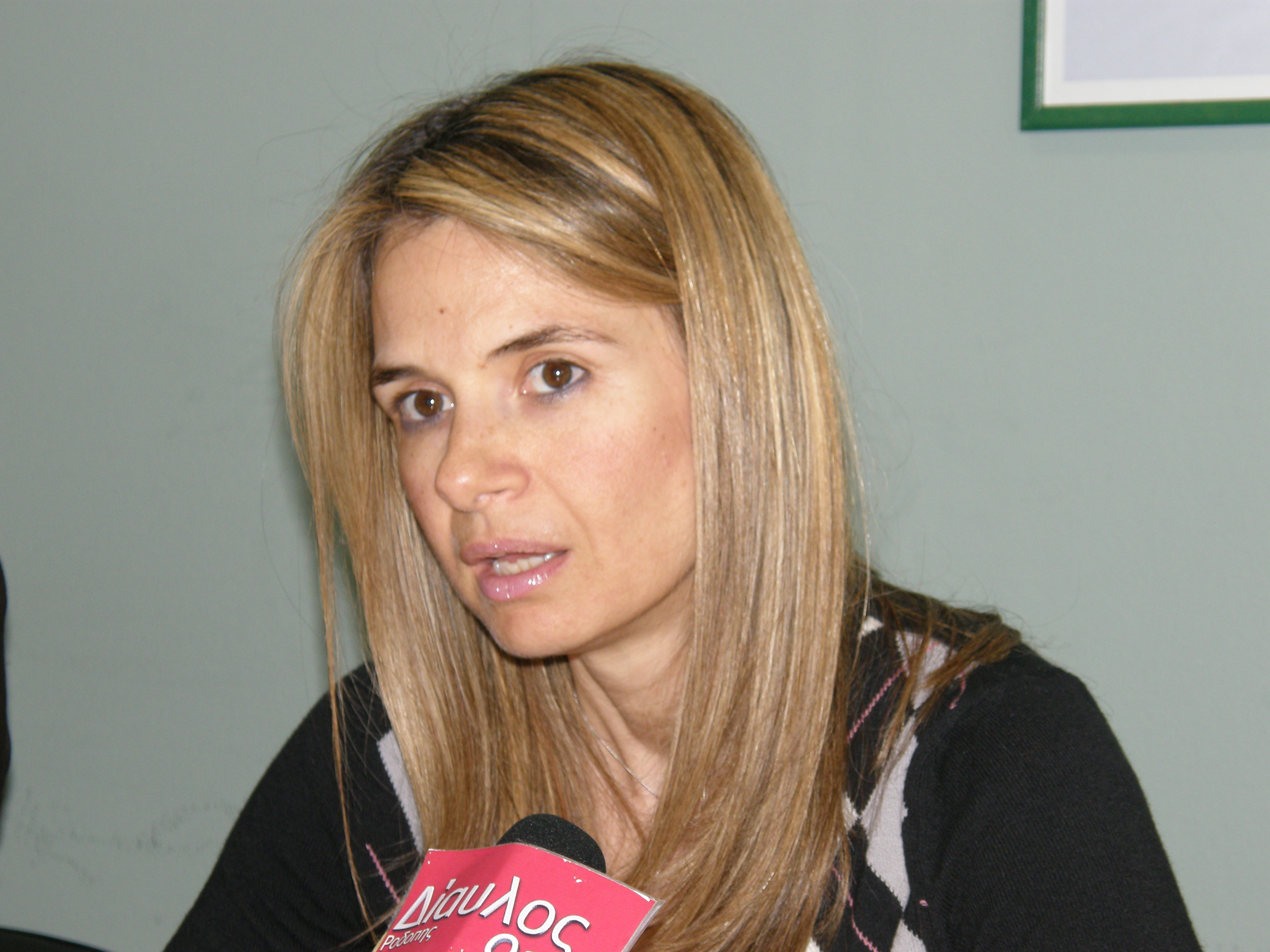

Deputy Minister for Rural Development and Food
- In office 7 September 2010 – 17 June 2011
- President: Karolos Papoulias
- Prime Minister: George Papandreou

Personal details
- Born: 1965 (age 60–61) Athens, Greece
- Party: Panhellenic Socialist Movement
- Education: National and Kapodistrian University of Athens
- Profession: Politician

Milena Apostolaki (Greek: Μιλένα Αποστολάκη, born 21 February 1965) is a Greek politician of the Panhellenic Socialist Movement (PASOK).

== Life ==
Apostolaki was born in 1965 in Athens, Greece. She finished her high school studies in the Arsakeion of Psychiko, and graduated from the Law School of the National and Kapodistrian University of Athens.

In 1989 she joined the Law Department of Olympic Airlines, and in 1992 she joined a law office in Washington DC dealing with Aviation Law and International contracts. From 1993 until 1995 she was a member of the Law Office of Prime Minister Andreas Papandreou. From 1995 until 2000 she was a special advisor to the ministries of Justice, Culture and Development.

Apostolaki was elected for the first time as a Member of the Hellenic Parliament for the Athens B constituency with the Panhellenic Socialist Movement at the general elections of 9 April 2000, and has been re-elected in the 7 March 2004, 16 September 2007 and 4 October 2009 elections. Apostolaki has been member of the Standing Committee of Educational Issues of the Parliament, of the Special Standing Committee of Research and Technology and of the Committee for the Revision of the Constitution.

On 13 April 2000 she was appointed as a Deputy Minister of Development in charge of Commerce and Consumer Protection. In October 2001, she was elected as a member of the PASOK Executive Bureau. From 16 March 2005 to December 2006 she was elected as a member of the PASOK Political Council, with responsibility for Education and Culture from June 2006.

She married businessman Polichronis Sygelidis and they had a son. They divorced in 2004, however a court settlement has not been reached. Mr Sygelidis initiated criminal procedures against his wife on the grounds of violating the terms of access to their child. On the back of this the Greek Vouli (parliament) refused to lift the parliamentary immunity enjoyed by Apostolakis. But the case went to the European Court of Human Rights which found in favour of Mr Sygelidis and found against the Hellenic Republic; it fined Greece €19,000 in favour of Sygelidis.

She briefly ran in the 2024 PASOK – KINAL leadership election for the leadership of the PASOK – KINAL party on 6 October 2024, from 1 July to 24 July 2024.

Apostolaki is fluent in English and French.
