= Order of precedence in Greece =

Relative preeminence of officials for ceremonial purposes

The order of precedence of Greece is fixed by the Decree 52749/2006 of the Minister of the Interior, and prescribes the protocollary hierarchy of the Greek political leadership. The President, as head of state, is first, and the Prime Minister, as head of government, is second.

1. The President of the Republic (Konstantinos Tasoulas)
2. The Prime Minister (Kyriakos Mitsotakis)
3. The Speaker of the Parliament (Nikitas Kaklamanis)
4. The Archbishop of Athens and All Greece (Ieronymos II)
5. The Leader of the Official Opposition (Nikos Androulakis)
6. The Former Presidents of the Republic in order of term:
  1. Prokopis Pavlopoulos
  2. Katerina Sakellaropoulou
7. The Deputy Prime Minister (Kostis Hatzidakis)

== Current office-holders ==
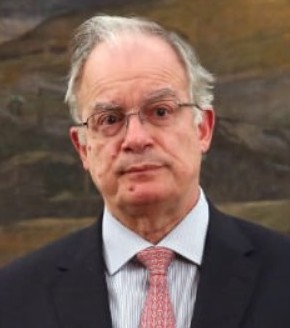
Konstantinos Tasoulas
President of Greece, head of state and commander-in-chief of the Greek Armed Forces
since 13 March 2025

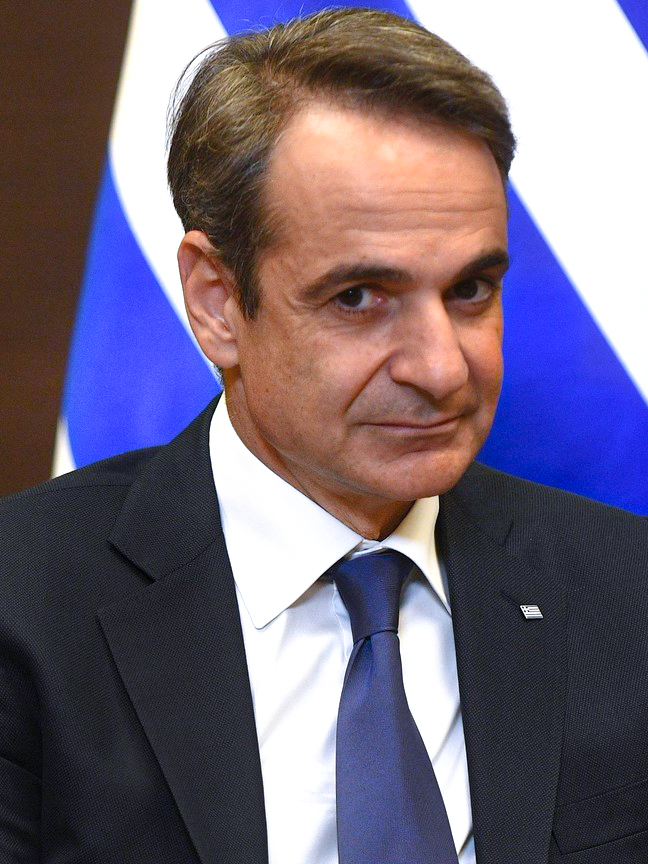
Kyriakos Mitsotakis
Prime Minister of Greece, head of government and leader of the Cabinet of Greece
since 26 June 2023

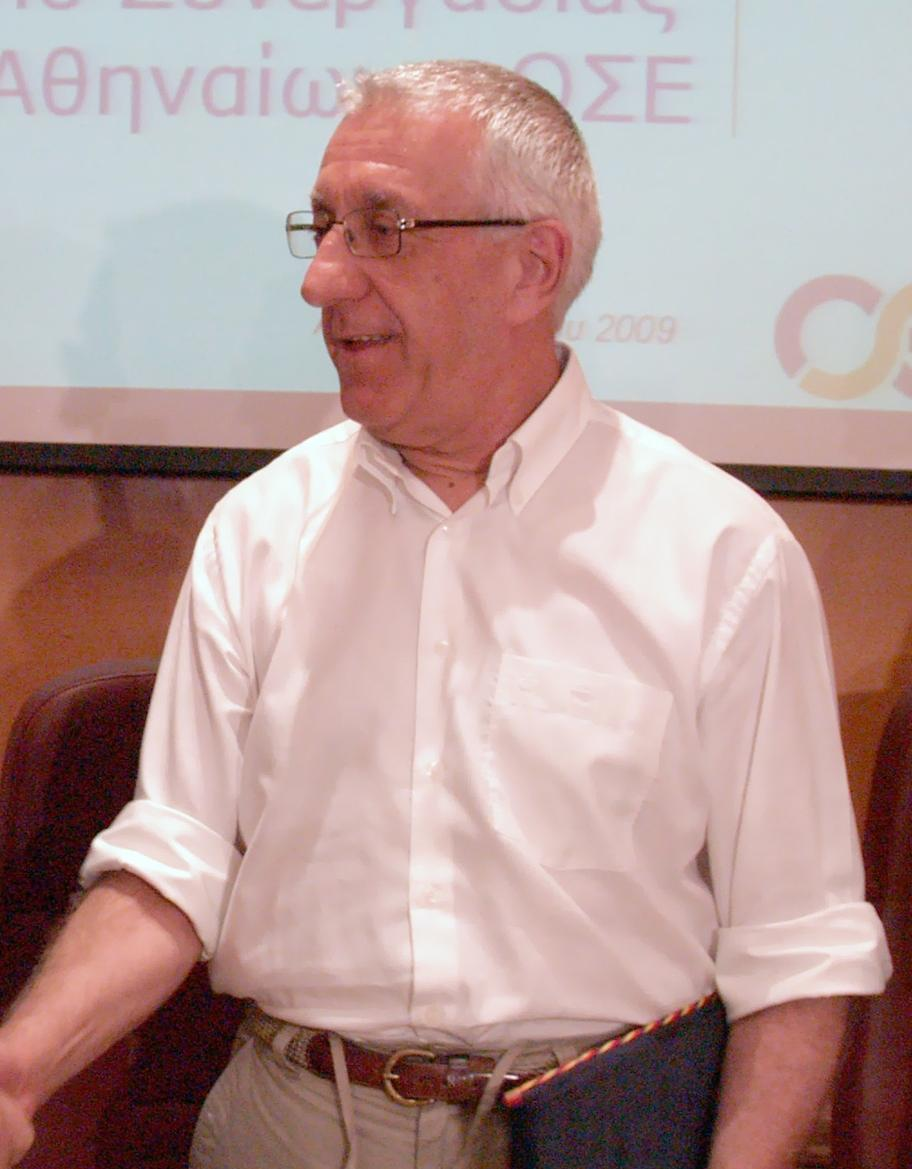
Nikitas Kaklamanis
Speaker of the Parliament
since 22 January 2025

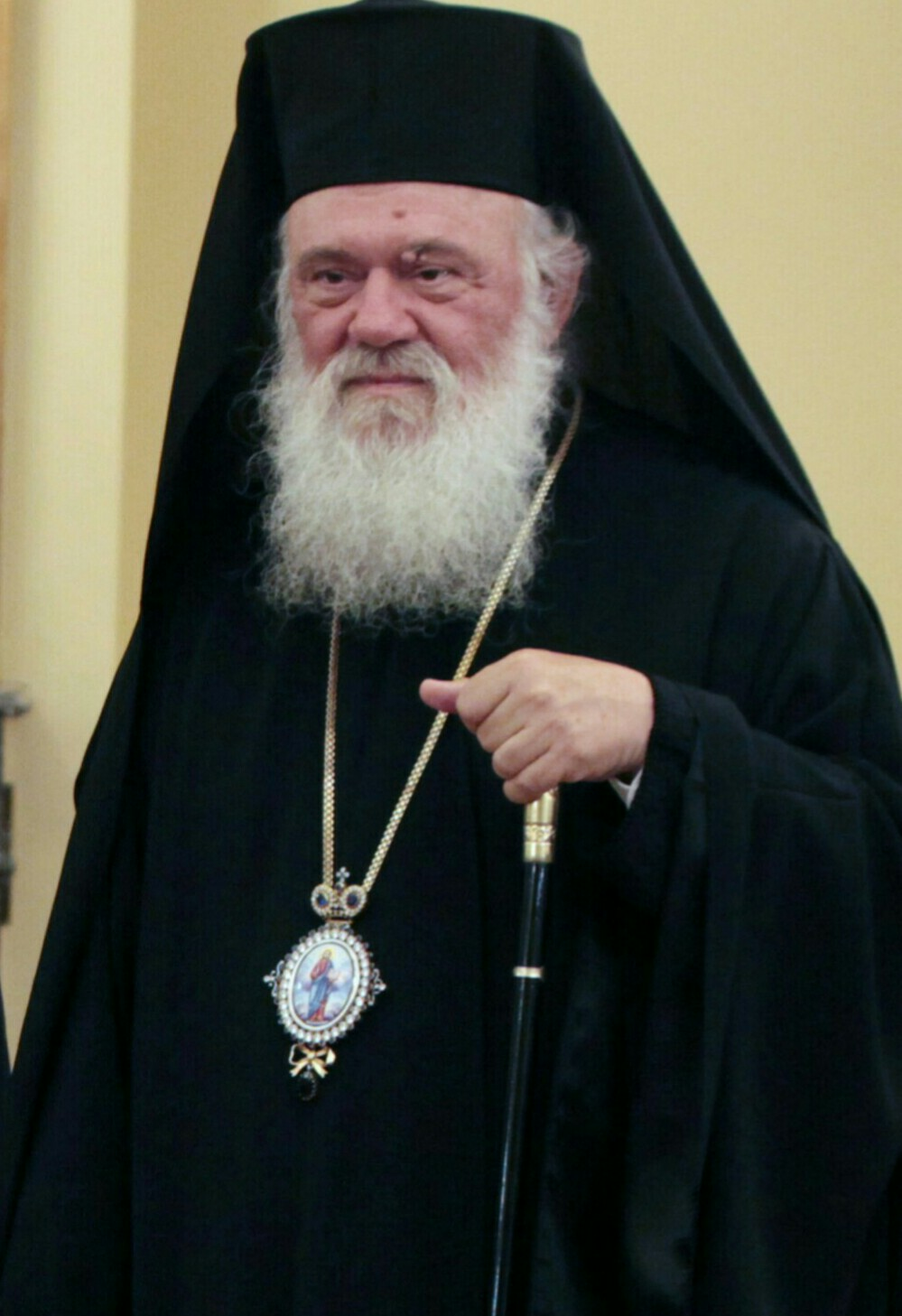
Ieronymos II
Archbishop of Athens and All Greece, head of the Church of Greece
since 7 February 2008

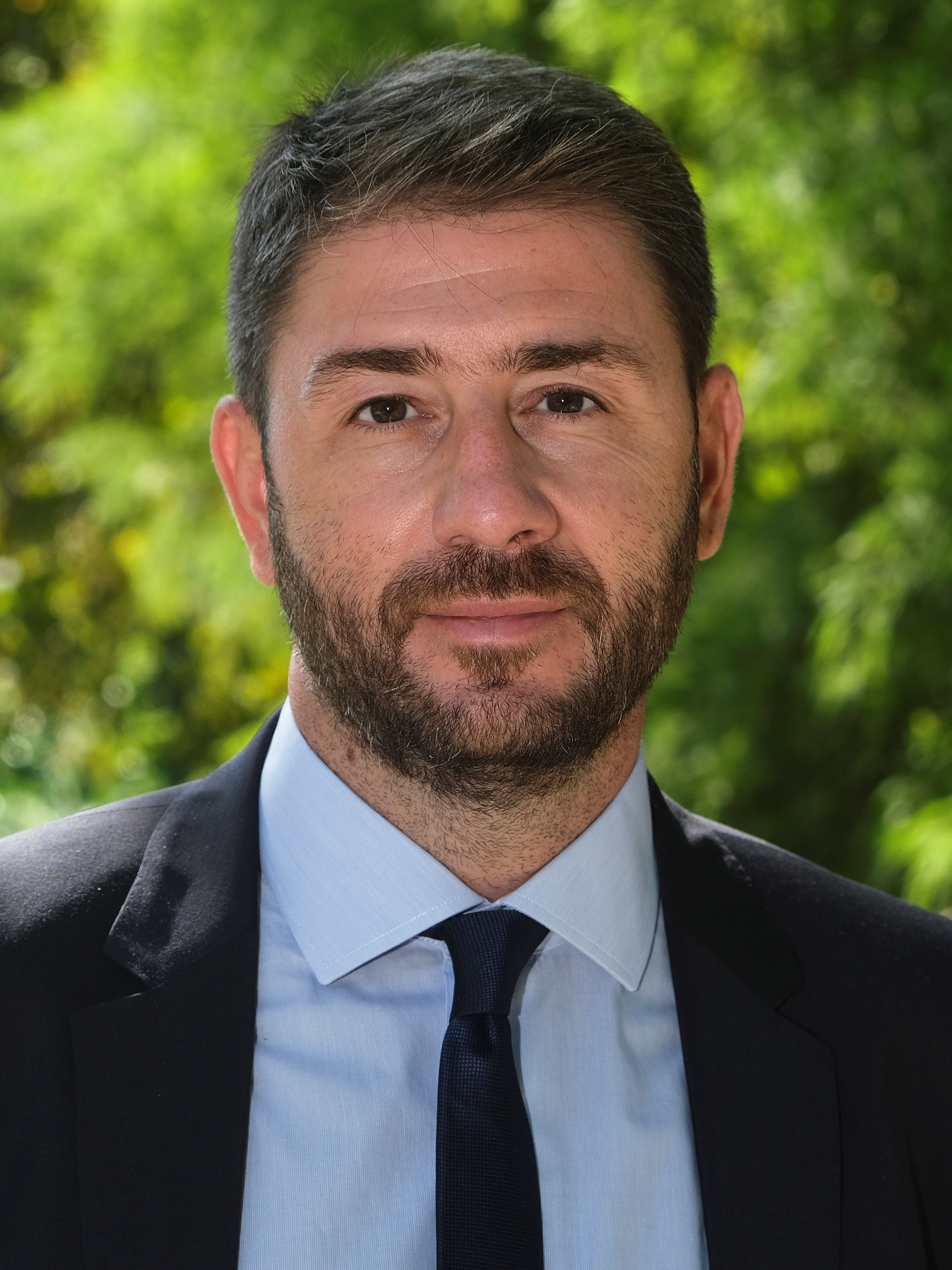
Nikos Androulakis
Leader of the Official Opposition
since 21 November 2024

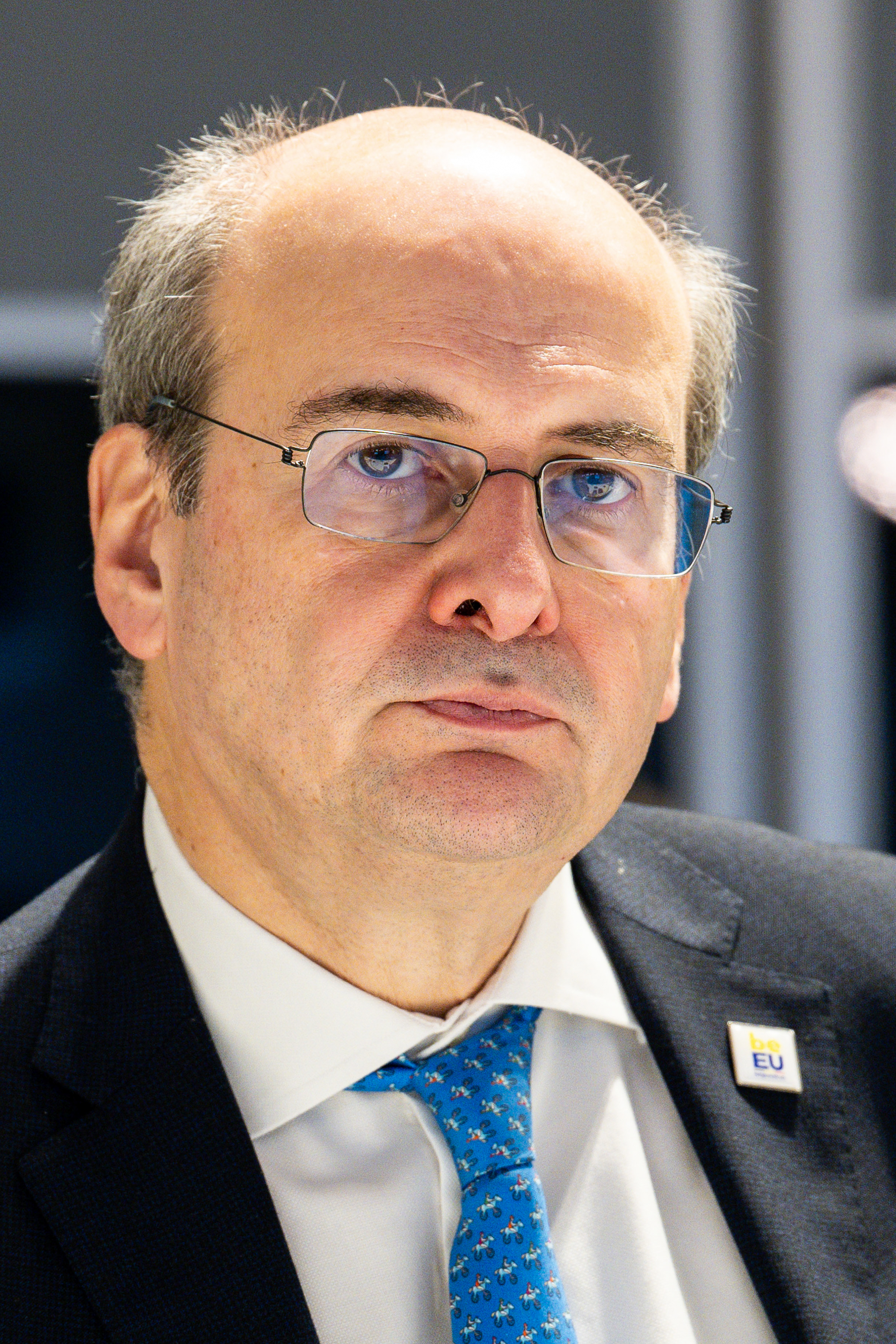
Kostis Hatzidakis
Vice President of the Government
since 15 March 2025
