= Michalis Katrinis =

Greek dentist and politician

- Μιχάλης Κατρίνης
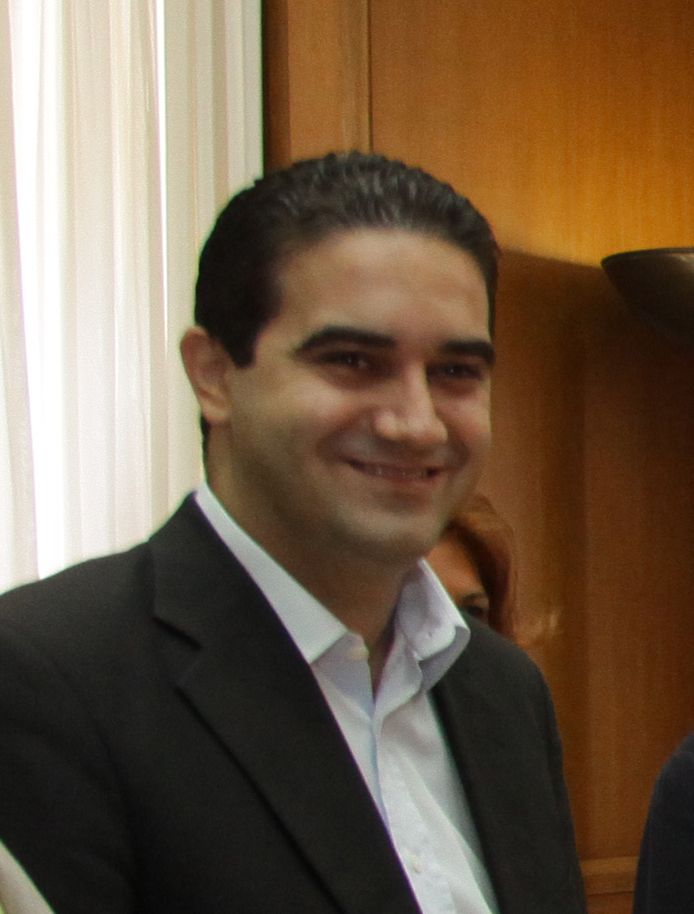

Leader of PASOK – KINAL in the Hellenic Parliament
- In office 14 December 2021 – 22 April 2023
- Preceded by: Fofi Gennimata
- Succeeded by: Nikos Androulakis

MP for Elis
- Incumbent
- Assumed office 7 July 2019
- In office 16 September 2007 – 11 April 2012

Personal details
- Born: September 1, 1975 (age 51) Pelopio, Elis
- Party: PASOK – Movement for Change
- Education: National and Kapodistrian University of Athens
- Website: katrinis.gr

Michalis Katrinis (Greek: Μιχάλης Κατρίνης) (born 1 September 1975 in Pelopio), is a Greek dentist and politician. He has served as an MP for Elis from 2007 to 2012 and then starting again from 2019, and he also served as PASOK – KINAL's Parliamentary leader while Nikos Androulakis was an MEP, from late 2021 to mid-2023. He is also standing as a candidate in the 2024 PASOK – KINAL leadership election.

== Early life and career ==
Michalis Katrinis was born in 1975 in Pelopio, Elis. He graduated from the National and Kapodistrian University of Athens in 2000 with a degree in dentistry. He completed postgraduate studies at the same School (MSc in Oral Biology), as well as at the National School of Public Health (Master in Health Services Management). He has worked as a dentist and as a scientific collaborator of the Athens School of Dentistry. In addition, he is a PhD candidate at the Department of Social and Educational Policy of the University of Peloponnese.

From March to December 2014 he was president of OKANA.

=== Political career ===
From his youth he joined PASP and in PASOK Youth and then eventually in PASOK. He is a member of the Central Political Committee of PASOK – KINAL.

In the 2007 and 2009 elections he was elected as an MP for Elis, a position he held until April 2012. In the 2019 elections, he was once again elected as an MP for Elis, with KINAL, and on 17 July 2019 he was appointed shadow minister for Development and Investments of the Parliamentary Group of KINAL. In January 2021, he was appointed Parliamentary Representative of the party. On 14 December 2021, the President of KINAL, Nikos Androulakis, -as he was still an MEP,- nominated him, to lead KINAL's parliamentary group. He was re-elected in the May and June elections of 2023 and in July he was appointed Parliamentary representative along with Dimitris Manzos.
