= Nikos Androulakis =

Greek politician and civil engineer (born 1979)

- Νίκος Ανδρουλάκης
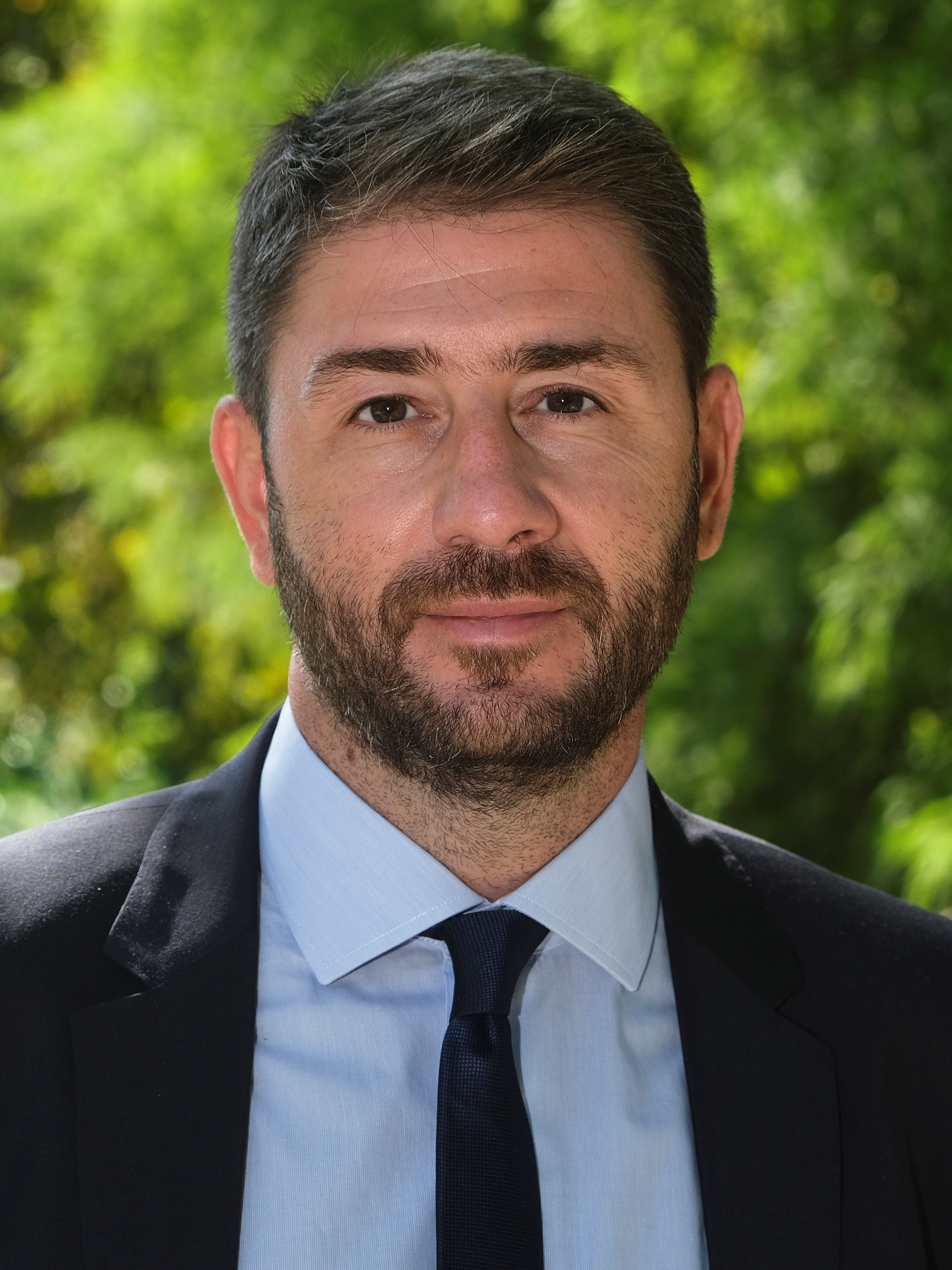
- Official portrait, 2021

Leader of the Opposition
- Incumbent
- Assumed office 21 November 2024
- Prime Minister: Kyriakos Mitsotakis
- Preceded by: Nikos Pappas

President of PASOK – Movement for Change (Note: Named "Movement for Change" until 9 May 2022)
- Incumbent
- Assumed office 12 December 2021
- Preceded by: Fofi Gennimata

President of the Panhellenic Socialist Movement
- In office 12 December 2021 – 29 March 2026
- Preceded by: Fofi Gennimata
- Succeeded by: Party merged into PASOK-KINAL
Parliamentary offices
Member of the Hellenic Parliament
Incumbent
Assumed office 21 May 2023
Constituency	Thessaloniki A
Member of the European Parliament
In office 2 July 2014 – 2 May 2023
Constituency	Greece

Personal details
- Born: 7 February 1979 (age 47) Heraklion, Greece
- Party: PASOK – Movement for Change
- Other political affiliations: PASOK (until 2026)
- Education: Democritus University of Thrace (BS, MS); University of Athens
- Profession: Politician; Civil engineer
- Website: androulakisnikos.gr

Nikos Androulakis (Greek: Νίκος Ανδρουλάκης; born 7 February 1979) is a Greek politician who has served as president of PASOK – Movement for Change since 2021. He also served as a Member of the European Parliament from 2014 to 2023.

He was elected as member of the Hellenic Parliament after the May 2023 Greek legislative election serving the constituency of Thessaloniki A.

== Early life and career ==
Born 1979 in Heraklion, Androulakis graduated from the 3rd High School of Heraklion and then studied civil engineering at the Democritus University of Thrace, from where he also received a MSc in "New Materials and Environment". He has worked in the tourism industry and as a civil engineer, he also gave courses in the School of Pedagogical and Technological Education.

== Political career ==
=== Career in national politics ===
In 2001 Androulakis became a member of the Central Council of PASOK Youth and in 2008 he was appointed member of the National Council of PASOK. On 4 March 2013 he was elected member of the central political committee of PASOK, which on its first session on 14 March 2013 elected him as its new secretary.

=== Member of the European Parliament (2014–2023) ===
In the 2014 European Parliament election, Androulakis was elected as one of two MEPs on PASOK's Elia list. He was affiliated with the parliamentary group of the Progressive Alliance of Socialists and Democrats (S&D) and was a member of the Committee on Foreign Affairs.

In addition to his committee assignments, Androulakis was part of the parliament's delegation for relations with China. He was also a member of the MEPs Against Cancer group.

Androulakis won the race to lead KINAL and PASOK over former Prime Minister George Papandreou on 12 December 2021 to succeed deceased Fofi Gennimata.

=== Attempt of wiretapping Androulakis ===
In June 2022, experts notified Androulakis that, in September 2021, weeks after declaring that he would be a candidate to possibly lead PASOK, he had received a text message with a link that would have installed the spyware, Predator, had he tapped on the link on his phone. Shortly after, he filed a complaint with Greece's Supreme Court, over an attempted bugging of his mobile phone with surveillance software. The ensuing scandal led to the resignations of the chief of the Greek National Intelligence Service (EYP), Panagiotis Kontoleon, as well as the Secretary General and nephew of the Prime Minister, Grigoris Dimitriadis.

=== Stagnation and proceeding leadership election ===
After the stagnation of PASOK – KINAL in the 2024 European Parliament elections and the failure to become the official opposition to Mitsotakis' New Democracy, several members of his party, including former Minister for Culture and Tourism Pavlos Geroulanos and current Mayor of Athens Haris Doukas, along with others, set their goals on competing for leadership in the 2024 PASOK – KINAL leadership election taking place on 6 October 2024.

== Notes ==
Political offices
Preceded by Nikos Pappas	Leader of the Opposition; 2024–present	Incumbent
Party political offices
Preceded by Fofi Gennimata	President of the Panhellenic Socialist Movement; 2021–2026	Succeeded by Party merged into PASOK-KINAL
Preceded by Unitary party created	President of PASOK – Movement for Change; 2026–present	Incumbent
Order of precedence
Preceded by Ieronymos II as Archbishop of Athens	Order of precedence of Greece; Leader of the Opposition	Succeeded by Prokopis Pavlopoulos as former President of the Republic
