= Haris Doukas =

Greek mechanical engineer and politician

- Χάρης Δούκας
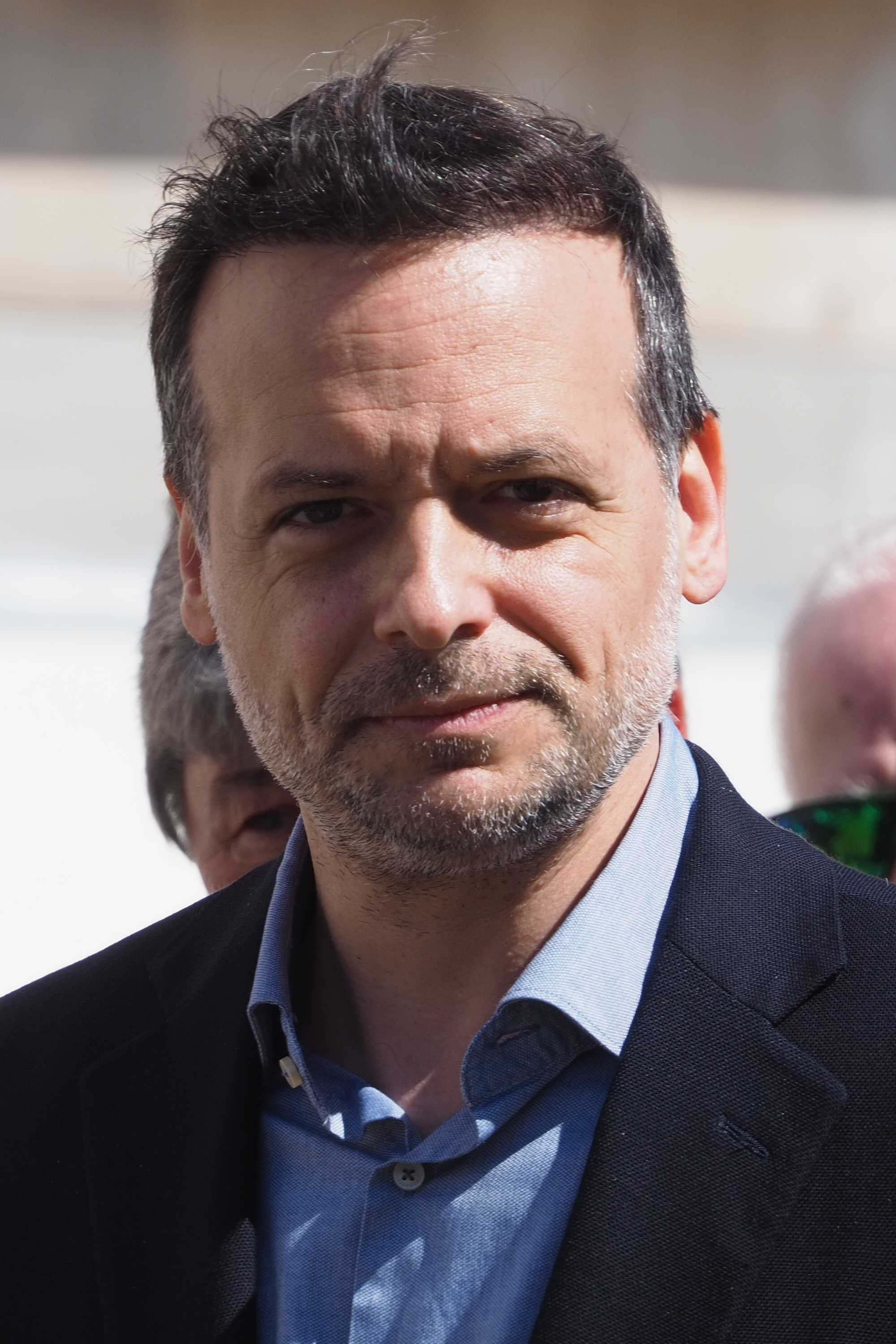
- Doukas in 2024

Mayor of Athens
- Incumbent
- Assumed office 1 January 2024
- Preceded by: Kostas Bakoyannis

Personal details
- Born: 12 May 1980 (age 46) Athens, Greece
- Party: PASOK – Movement for Change
- Spouse: Georgia Polytanou (m. 2024)
- Education: Aristotle University of Thessaloniki
- Occupation: Politician; Mechanical Engineer; Professor

Haris Doukas (Greek: Χάρης Δούκας; born 12 May 1980) is a Greek mechanical engineer and politician who has served as Mayor of Athens since 2024, succeeding Kostas Bakoyannis. He is also a Professor of energy policy and management at the School of Electrical and Computer Engineering of the National Technical University of Athens.

== Scientific career ==
Haris Doukas field of expertise is related with the development of decision support systems for energy and climate policy, placing the human factor at the core of the modelling processes and policymaking towards sustainable development.

His integrative frameworks are based on co-creation with citizens, along with co-ownership where feasible. Doukas uses linguistic variables for capturing the essence of human behaviour in energy and climate policymaking, enabling the design of policies that listen to "what people want" and "what people can do", which is fundamental for their success.

He has more than 150 scientific publications in international scientific journals with reviewers is the abovementioned fields, he is the co-author of the Greek book Multiple Criteria Decision Models for Energy and Environmental Systems, the co-editor of the open-access book Understanding Risks and Uncertainties in Energy and Climate Policy: Multidisciplinary Methods and Tools for a Low Carbon Society and the co-author of the English book Multicriteria Portfolio Construction with Python. Moreover, Doukas is an Associate Editor of the Operational Research International Journal and the General Secretary of the Hellenic Operational Research Society (HELORS).

Haris Doukas participates as an expert at the World Renewable Energy Congress / Network (WREC / WREN) where he has received a special award for his contribution, the World Energy Council (WEC) and the EU GCC Clean Energy Technology Network.

== Political career ==
On 3 August 2023, Doukas launched his campaign to be elected mayor of Athens in the 2023 Athens Municipal elections under the Athens Now party and with the support of PASOK – Movement for Change and Volt Greece. Doukas campaigned to develop Athens into a green city. His campaign was successful, defeating the incumbent mayor Kostas Bakoyannis in the runoff.

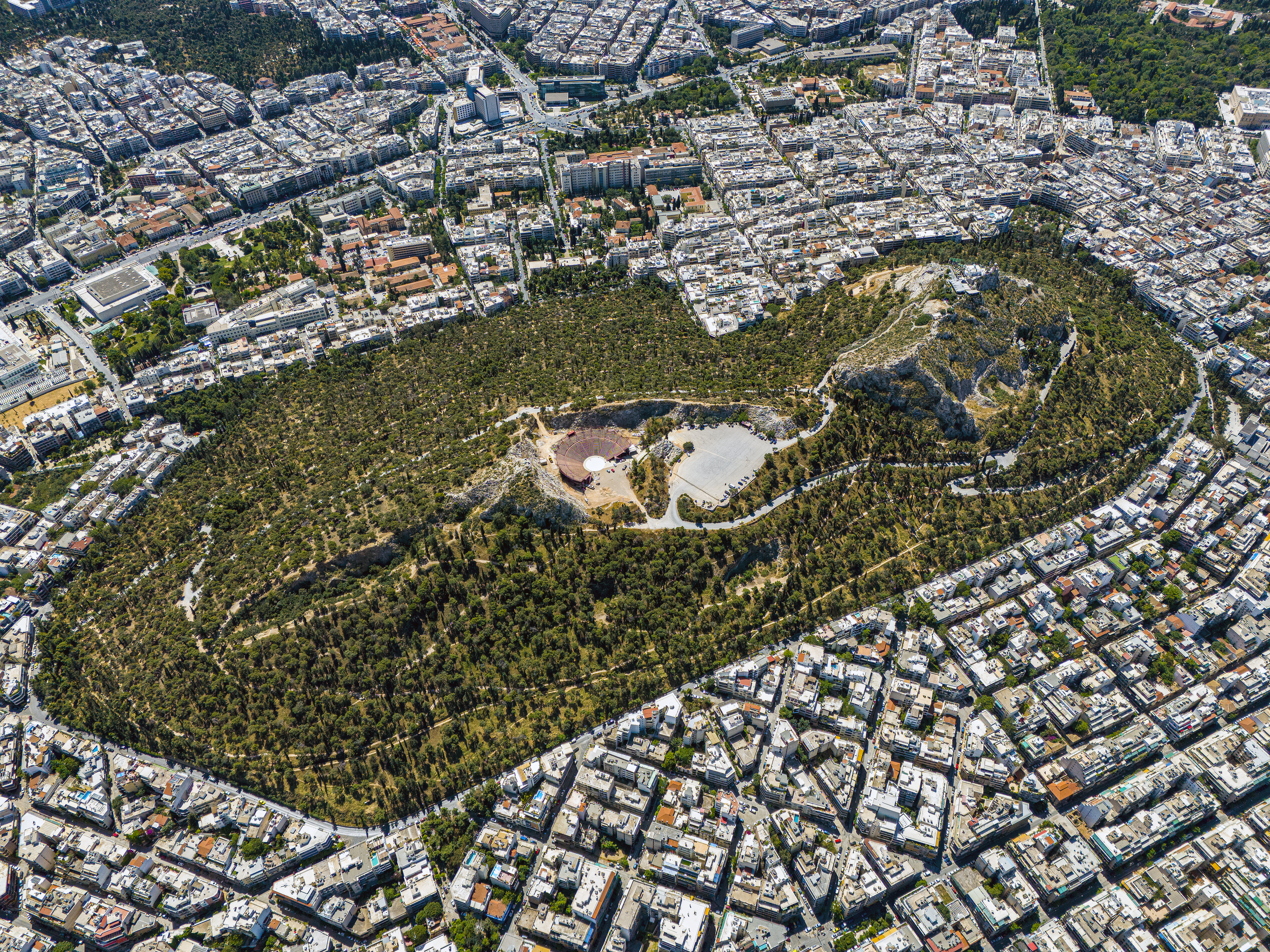
Mount Lycabettus

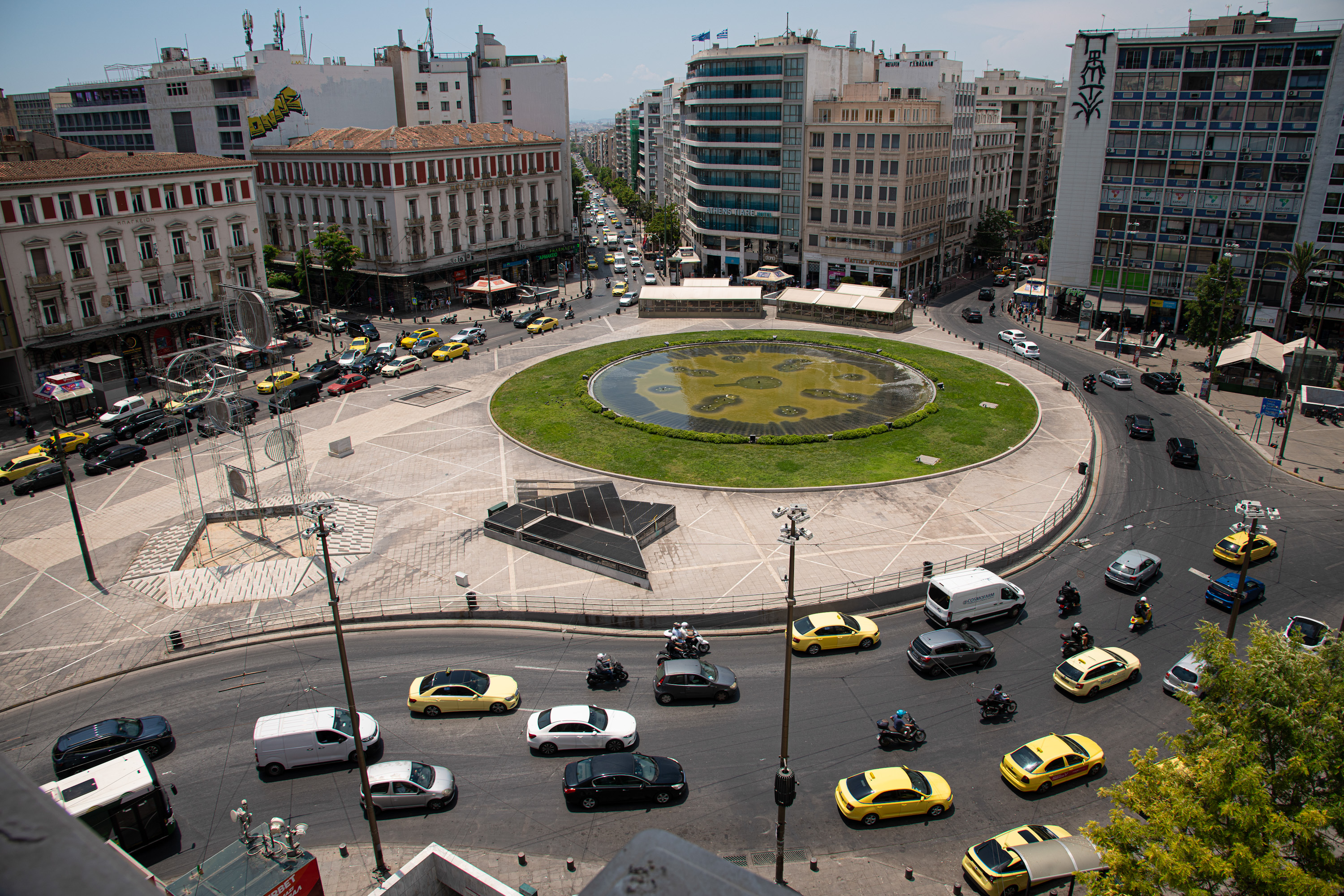
Omonoia Square, 2026

On 30 June 2024 Doukas officially announced his candidacy for leader of PASOK hoping to take the place of Nikos Androulakis; hoping to unite the centre-left powers (Syriza, PASOK) in prospects of the Next greek elections (probably 2027), mostly due to the stagnation of PASOK in the 2024 European Parliament elections. Along with Doukas came several others wishing to succeed Androulakis including former Minister for Culture and Tourism Pavlos Geroulanos.

== Bibliography ==
See complete bibliography: Haris Doukas Google Scholar page

The top 5 of his most cited articles up to 29 July 2021, are listed below:

- Haris Doukas, Konstantinos D Patlitzianas, Konstantinos Iatropoulos, John Psarras. "Intelligent building energy management system using rule sets". Building and environment Journal, Volume 42, Issue 10, 1 October 2007, Pages 3562-3569
- Haris Ch Doukas, Botsikas M Andreas, John E Psarras. "Multi-criteria decision aid for the formulation of sustainable technological energy priorities using linguistic variables". European journal of operational research, Volume 182, Issue 2, 16 October 2007, Pages 844-855
- Haris Doukas, Christos Nychtis, John Psarras. "Assessing energy-saving measures in buildings through an intelligent decision support model". Building and environment Journal, Volume 44, Issue 2, 1 February 2009, Pages 290-298
- Vangelis Marinakis, Haris Doukas, Charikleia Karakosta, John Psarras. "An integrated system for buildings’ energy-efficient automation: Application in the tertiary sector". Applied Energy Journal, Volume 101, 1 January 2013, Pages 6-14
- Konstantinos D Patlitzianas, Haris Doukas, Argyris G Kagiannas, John Psarras. "Sustainable energy policy indicators: Review and recommendations". Renewable Energy Journal, Volume 33, Issue 5, 1 May 2008, Pages 966-973
