= Nadia Giannakopoulou =

Greek politician

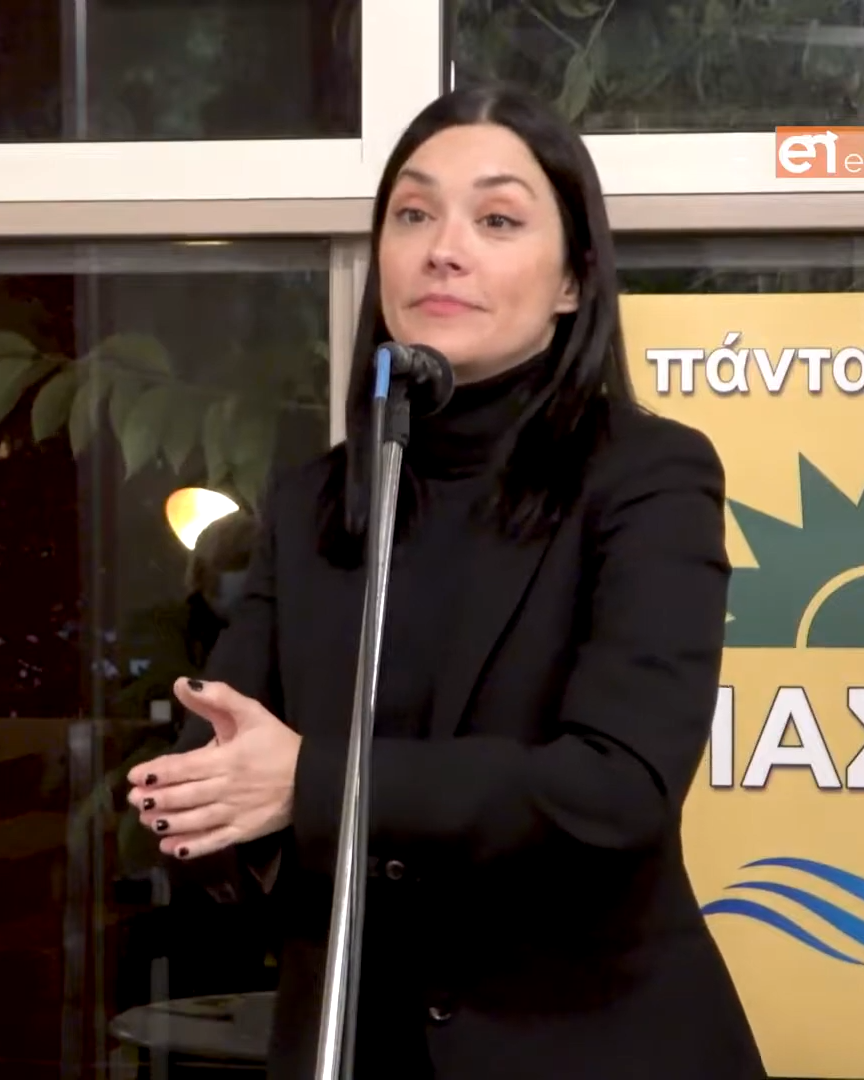
Nadia Giannakopoulou in 2021.

Konstantina "Nadia" Giannakopoulou (Greek: Νάντια Γιαννακοπούλου) (born 11 December 1977 in Athens) is a Greek lawyer and politician, who has served as a member of the Hellenic Parliament for Athens B2 with the PASOK – Movement for Change since July 2019, previously from 2009 to 2012.

She stood as a candidate in the 2024 PASOK – KINAL leadership election. She finished in last place.

== See also ==
- List of members of the Hellenic Parliament, May 2012
- List of members of the Hellenic Parliament, 2019
- List of members of the Hellenic Parliament, June 2023
