= 2023 Greek legislative election =

The term 2023 Greek legislative election may refer to:

- May 2023 Greek legislative election – 21 May
- June 2023 Greek legislative election – 25 June
