= Leader of the Official Opposition (Greece) =

Leader of the Official Opposition of Greece
- Αρχηγός της Αξιωματικής Αντιπολίτευσης
- Coat of Arms of Greece

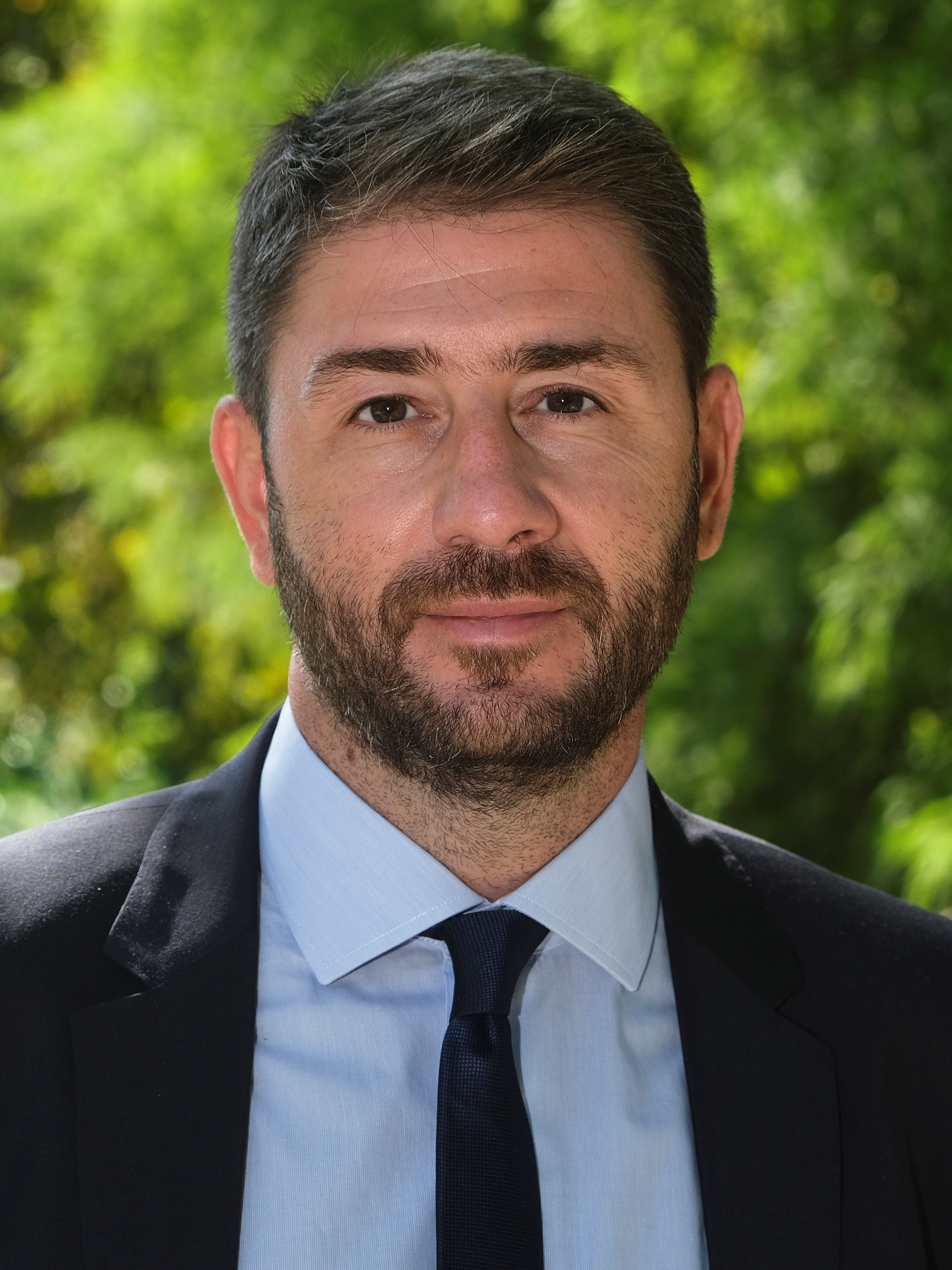
- Incumbent; Nikos Androulakis since 21 November 2024
- Member of: Hellenic Parliament
- Constituting instrument: Standing Orders of the Hellenic Parliament

The Leader of the Official Opposition (Greek: Αρχηγός της Αξιωματικής Αντιπολίτευσης) is the politician who leads the biggest opposition party in Greece.

Today Leader of the Official Opposition is the President of the parliamentary group of PASOK – Movement for Change, Nikos Androulakis.

== Role ==
According to the Rules of the Hellenic Parliament: "The President of the largest Parliamentary Group, who is not a member of the Government, is called the Leader of the Official Opposition, an office which gives him/her special rights (e.g. more speaking time during parliamentary sittings). (...) The leader of the party is also considered the President of the Parliamentary Group if he/she has been elected as a Member of Parliament."

The leader of the official opposition is regarded as the fourth highest state office of the Hellenic Republic, after the President of the Republic, the Prime Minister and the Speaker of the Hellenic Parliament.
In addition, the leader of the opposition has certain minor privileges at the stage of the parliamentary procedure, including the ability to request two debates before the agenda, a longer speaking time and the right to appoint up to three deputy representatives at meetings, the same as the Prime Minister.

=== Change of opposition leader without elections ===
The crisis that erupted in Syriza in the autumn of 2024 due to the expulsion of the elected President Stefanos Kaselakis from the party's organs and the subsequent rupture between the two sides led to the independence of MPs, resulting in the party losing the role of the official opposition, remaining second with 29 MPs behind Pasok (31 MPs), which was officially declared the official opposition on 21 November 2024. The President of the Parliament noted that this phenomenon - a change in the leader of the opposition without elections is unprecedented in the Greek parliamentary history.

Pasok returned as an opposition leader party after 15 years.

== List of leaders of the opposition since 1974 ==
Political party: EK–ND / EDIK PASOK ND Syriza PASOK – KINAL

Portrait	Name	Political party	Term of office	
	Georgios Mavros	EK–ND in 1976 merged into EDIK	21 November 1974	28 November 1977
	Andreas Papandreou	PASOK	28 November 1977	21 October 1981
	Georgios Rallis	New Democracy	21 October 1981	9 December 1981
	Evangelos Averoff	New Democracy	9 December 1981	1 September 1984
	Konstantinos Mitsotakis	New Democracy	1 September 1984	2 July 1989
	Andreas Papandreou	PASOK	2 July 1989	12 October 1989
None – Caretaker Cabinet of Ioannis Grivas			12 October 1989	23 November 1989
None – Ecumenical Government of Xenophon Zolotas			23 November 1989	11 April 1990
	Andreas Papandreou	PASOK	11 April 1990	13 October 1993
	Konstantinos Mitsotakis	New Democracy	13 October 1993	3 November 1993
	Miltiadis Evert	New Democracy	3 November 1993	21 March 1997
	Kostas Karamanlis	New Democracy	21 March 1997	10 March 2004
	George Papandreou	PASOK	10 March 2004	6 October 2009
	Kostas Karamanlis	New Democracy	6 October 2009	30 November 2009
	Antonis Samaras	New Democracy	30 November 2009	16 May 2012
None – Caretaker Cabinet of Panagiotis Pikrammenos			16 May 2012	20 June 2012
	Alexis Tsipras	Syriza	20 June 2012	26 January 2015
	Antonis Samaras	New Democracy	26 January 2015	5 July 2015
	Vangelis Meimarakis	New Democracy	5 July 2015	27 August 2015
None – Caretaker Cabinet of Vassiliki Thanou-Christophilou			27 August 2015	21 September 2015
	Vangelis Meimarakis	New Democracy	21 September 2015	24 November 2015
	Giannis Plakiotakis	New Democracy	24 November 2015	11 January 2016
	Kyriakos Mitsotakis	New Democracy	11 January 2016	8 July 2019
	Alexis Tsipras	Syriza	8 July 2019	25 May 2023
None – Caretaker Cabinet of Ioannis Sarmas			25 May 2023	26 June 2023
	Alexis Tsipras	Syriza	26 June 2023	29 June 2023
	Sokratis Famellos	Syriza	3 July 2023	27 August 2024
	Nikos Pappas	Syriza	27 August 2024	21 November 2024
	Nikos Androulakis	PASOK – Movement for Change	21 November 2024	Incumbent

== See also ==
- Prime Minister of Greece
