= Pavlos Geroulanos =

Greek politician (born 1966)

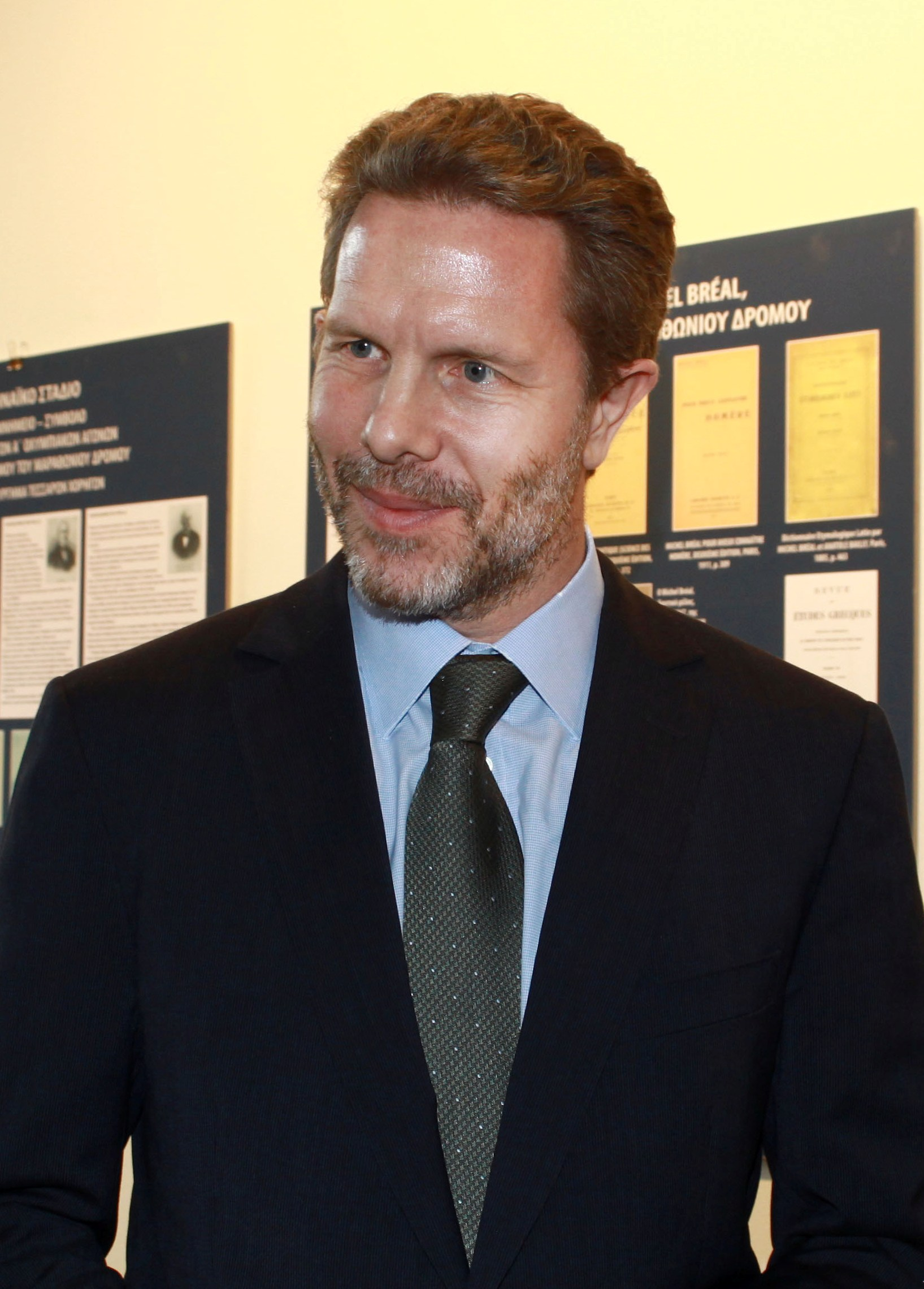

Minister for Culture and Tourism
- In office 7 October 2009 – 17 May 2012
- President: Karolos Papoulias
- Prime Minister: George Papandreou

Personal details
- Born: 29 May 1966 (age 60) Athens, Greece
- Party: Panhellenic Socialist Movement
- Education: Williams College, Harvard Kennedy School, MIT Sloan School of Management
- Profession: Politician

Pavlos Geroulanos (Greek: Παύλος Γερουλάνος, born in 1966 in Athens, Greece) is a Greek politician of the Panhellenic Socialist Movement. He served as the Minister for Culture and Tourism of Greece from 2009 until 2012.

== Life ==
Pavlos Geroulanos was born in 1966 in Athens, Greece. He is the great-grandson of Georgios Streit who was Foreign Minister of Greece on the eve of World War I.

Geroulanos graduated from Williams College in 1988 with highest honors with a degree in history. He played rugby with the Williams College Rugby Football club. In 1994 he received a master's degree in Public Administration from the Kennedy School of Government at Harvard University and an MBA from the MIT Sloan School of Management.

He worked as Financial Director for Photoelectron Corporation, a subsidiary of Thermo Electron Corporation, from 1989 until 1992. In 1994 he took over the position of Chief Financial Officer of Kefalonia Fisheries and oversaw the restructuring of the company. From 2004 to 2006 he was a consultant for the Egon Zehnder International.

Pavlos Geroulanos began his political career in 1999, as an advisor to George Papandreou, then the Minister for Foreign Affairs, and as Secretary General for Greeks Abroad, a position that he held until 2004.

From 2006 to 2009 he was director of the Papandreou's party political bureau, in the latter's capacity as president of the Panhellenic Socialist Movement. Prior to the national elections of 2009, Geroulanos was appointed as PASOK's Secretary for Communications, acting as campaign manager for the European election campaign as well as the national election campaign of 2009.

After PASOK's electoral victory in October 2009, Pavlos Geroulanos was appointed as the Minister for Culture and Tourism.

The robbery at the Archaeological Museum of the history of the Ancient Olympic Games on 17 February 2012, resulted in Culture Minister Pavlos Geroulanos' resignation. His resignation was not accepted.

On 30 June 2024 he announced along with Haris Doukas his interest in being leader of PASOK and in competing with incumbent Nikos Androulakis for said title after PASOK's stagnation in the 2024 European Parliament Elections and its failure to become the main opposition party to ND. He raised over 5000 signatures for him becoming leader of PASOK.
