= Thessaloniki A =

Electoral constituency of the Hellenic Parliament

- Electoral constituency for the Hellenic Parliament
- Thessaloniki A within Central Macedonia

- Central Macedonia within Greece
- Regional unit: Thessaloniki
- Administrative region: Central Macedonia
- Electorate: 531.732 (July 2019)

Current Electoral constituency
- Created: 1958
- Number of members: 16 Members of Parliament
- Created from: Thessaloniki

Thessaloniki Alpha (Greek: εκλογική περιφέρεια Α΄ Θεσσαλονίκης) is an electoral constituency of the Hellenic Parliament. With an electorate of 531,732 eligible voters (as of 2019) in the urban area of Thessaloniki, Central Macedonia, it elects sixteen members of parliament.

The constituency was formed in 1958, when the former Thessaloniki constituency was divided in two, with the remaining municipalities of the Thessaloniki regional unit (until 2010, Prefecture) constituting Thessaloniki B.

== Election results ==
=== Thessaloniki A constituency results ===
Election	1st party	2nd party	3rd party	4th party	5th party	source
1974	New Democracy 54.5%	EK-ND 17.32%	United Left 15.87%	PASOK 10.92%	ΕΔΕ 1.04%	
1977	New Democracy 45.79%	PASOK 22.12%	KKE 11.97%	EDIK 9.02%	Symmachia 5.05%	
1981	PASOK 47.64%	New Democracy 32.82%	KKE 13.1%	KKE Interior 2.08%	Progressive Party 2.05%	
1985	PASOK 44.67%	New Democracy 41.21%	KKE 10.31%	KKE Interior 2.66%	EPEN 0.51%	
June 1989	New Democracy 45.6%	PASOK 36.11%	Synaspismos 15.31%	Democratic Renewal 0.92%	AKOA 0.29%	
November 1989	New Democracy 46.31%	PASOK 38.96%	Synaspismos 12.91%	Alternative Ecologists 0.89%		
1990	New Democracy 47.58%	PASOK 37.43%	Synaspismos 11.98%	Alternative Ecologists 1.27%	Democratic Renewal 0.69%	
1993	PASOK 44.33%	New Democracy 39.02%	Political Spring 6.14%	KKE 5.21%	Synaspismos 3.94%	
1996	PASOK 38.95%	New Democracy 36.59%	KKE 6.29%	Synaspismos 6.18%	DIKKI 5.65%	
2000	PASOK 41.86%	New Democracy 41.61%	KKE 6.71%	Synaspismos 3.65%	DIKKI 3.05%	
2004	New Democracy 43.7%	PASOK 37.45%	KKE 6.67%	LAOS 4.42%	SYRIZA 3.97%	
2007	New Democracy 37.38%	PASOK 34.63%	KKE 10.31%	LAOS 6.22%	SYRIZA 6.12%	
2009	PASOK 39.11%	New Democracy 30.30%	KKE 9.53%	LAOS 8.26%	SYRIZA 5.77%	
May 2012	SYRIZA 17.46%	New Democracy 14.81%	ANEL 11.57%	PASOK 10.42%	KKE 9.31%	
June 2012	New Democracy 27.75%	SYRIZA 26.95%	PASOK 10.23%	ANEL 8.92%	DEMAR 7.45%	
January 2015	SYRIZA 34.12%	New Democracy 24.84%	XA 7.07%	The River 7.00%	KKE 5.61%	
September 2015	SYRIZA 35.82%	New Democracy 25.29%	XA 7.27%	UC 6.77%	KKE 5.31%	
2019	New Democracy 34.15%	SYRIZA 31.31%	Movement for Change 6.05%	Greek Solution 5.39%	KKE 5.3%	
May 2023	New Democracy 35.52%	SYRIZA 19.70%	EL 8.35%	PE 4.52%	MeRA25 3.32%	
June 2023	New Democracy 35.28%	SYRIZA 17.52%	KKE 8.17%	Movement for Change 8.14%	EL 7.97%	

== Members of Parliament ==
=== Current Members of Parliament ===
Name	Parliamentary Group
Kostas Karamanlis	ND
Konstantinos Gioulekas	ND
Eleni Rapti	ND
Stavros Kalafatis	ND
Simopoylos Stratos	ND
Efthimiou Anna	ND
Kouvelas Dimitrios	ND
Notopoulou Katerina	SYRIZA
Ioannis Amanatidis	SYRIZA
Konstantinos Zouraris	SYRIZA
Alexandros Triantafyllidis	SYRIZA
Giannoulis Christos	SYRIZA
Kastanidis Haris	Movement for Change
Ioannis Delis	KKE
Avdelas Apostolos	Greek Solution
Yanis Varoufakis	MeRA25

=== Members of Parliament (September 2015 – June 2019) ===
The following sixteen MPs have been elected in the Greek legislative election, September 2015:

Name	Parliamentary Group
Nikos Paraskevopoulos	SYRIZA
Ioannis Amanatidis	SYRIZA
Tasos Kourakis	SYRIZA
Markos Bolaris	SYRIZA
Triantafyllos Mitafidis	SYRIZA
Alexandros Triantafyllidis	SYRIZA
Kostas Karamanlis	ND
Konstantinos Gioulekas	ND
Stavros Kalafatis	ND
Eleni Rapti	ND
Antonios Gregos	XA
Evangelos Venizelos	Democratic Coalition
Ioannis Delis	KKE
Stavros Theodorakis	The River
Konstantinos Zouraris	Independent Greeks
Ioannis Saridis	Enosi Kentroon

=== Members of Parliament (January 2015 – August 2015) ===
The following sixteen MPs had been elected in the Greek legislative election, January 2015

- Ioannis Amanatidis SYRIZA
- Despoina Charalampidou SYRIZA
- Ioanna Gaitani SYRIZA
- Tasos Kourakis SYRIZA
- Triantafyllos Mitafidis SYRIZA
- Kyriaki Tektonidou SYRIZA
- Alexandros Triantafyllidis SYRIZA
- Konstantinos Gioulekas ND
- Stavros Kalafatis ND
- Kostas Karamanlis ND
- Eleni Rapti ND
- Antonios Gregos XA
- Christina Tachiaou The River
- Athanasios Vardalis KKE
- Konstantinos Zouraris Independent Greeks
- Evangelos Venizelos PASOK

=== Members of Parliament (June 2012-2015) ===
- Kostas Karamanlis ND
- Konstantinos Gkioulekas ND
- Stavros Kalafatis ND
- Eleni Rapti ND
- Giannis Ioannidis ND
- Georgios Orfanos ND
- Anastasios Kourakis SYRIZA
- Ioannis Amanatidis SYRIZA
- Despoina Charalampidou SYRIZA
- Ioanna Gaitani SYRIZA
- Evangelos Venizelos PASOK
- Gavriil Avramidis ANEL
- Chrysoula-Maria Giatagana Independent Greeks
- Asimina Xirotyri-Aikaterinari DIMAR
- Antonios Gregos XA
- Theodosios Konstantinidis KKE

== European Parliament election ==
Thessaloniki A constituency results
	1st Party	2nd Party	3rd Party	4th Party	5th Party
1981	PASOK 34.5%	New Democracy 27.81%	KKE 16.23%	KKE Interior 7.96%	Party of Democratic Socialism 7.76%
1984	PASOK 38.87%	New Democracy 38.52%	KKE 12.9%	KKE Interior 4.89%	Party of Democratic Socialism 1.44%
1989	New Democracy 41.42%	PASOK 31.85%	Synaspismos 16.43%	Alternative Ecologists 1.96%	Democratic Renewal 1.2%
1994	PASOK 34.46%	New Democracy 33.00%	Political Spring 7.92%	Synaspismos 7.42%	KKE 6.79%
1999	New Democracy 34.24%	PASOK 30.27%	KKE 10.73%	DIKKI 6.71%	Synaspismos 5.87%
2004	New Democracy 39.27%	PASOK 29.87%	KKE 11.35%	LAOS 7.68%	SYRIZA 4.72%
2009	PASOK 30.67%	New Democracy 28.67%	KKE 10.14%	LAOS 9.81%	SYRIZA 5.83%
2014	SYRIZA 25.77%	New Democracy 19.87%	XA 10.22%	The River 7.93%	KKE 6.51%
2019	New Democracy 30.63%	SYRIZA 21.7%	XA 5.81%	Movement for Change 5.77%	Greek Solution 5.76%
