= PASOK – Movement for Change =

Political coalition in Greece

PASOK – Movement for Change ΠΑΣΟΚ – Κίνημα Αλλαγής
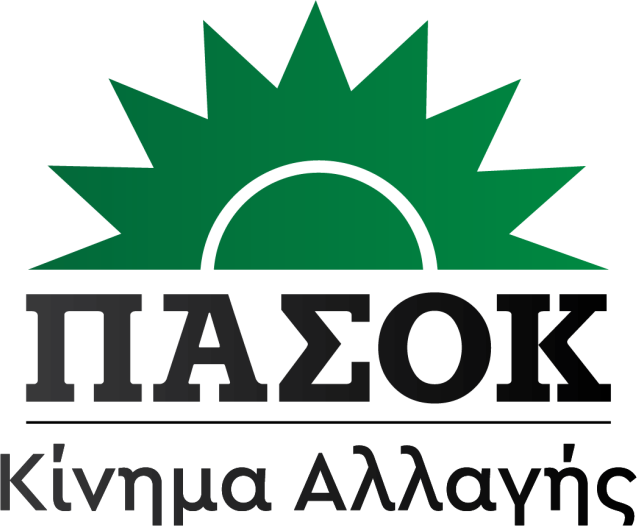
- Abbreviation: PASOK-KINAL
- President: Nikos Androulakis
- Secretary: Yannis Vardakastanis
- Founder: Fofi Gennimata
- Founded: 28 November 2017 (launch); 16–18 March 2018 (As a political alliance); 9 May 2022 (Renamed PASOK – Movement for Change); 29 March 2026 (As a unitary party)
- Merger of: PASOK; KIDISO et al., see Pre-unitary composition
- Preceded by: Democratic Alignment
- Headquarters: 50 Charilaou Trikoupi str., Athens
- Youth wing: New Generation of Change Movement
- Ideology: Social democracy Pro-Europeanism Social liberalism
- Political position: Centre-left
- European affiliation: Party of European Socialists
- European Parliament group: Progressive Alliance of Socialists and Democrats
- International affiliation: Socialist International; Progressive Alliance
- Anthem: O ílios o prásinos (The Green Sun)
- Member parties: See composition
- Parliament: 32 / 300
- European Parliament: 4 / 21
- Regional governors: 2 / 13
- Regional councillors: 114 / 611
- Mayors: 19 / 332

Website
- pasok.gr

The PASOK – Movement for Change (PASOK-KINAL; Greek: ΠΑΣΟΚ – Κίνημα Αλλαγής, romanized: PASOK – Kínima Allagís, abbr. ΚΙΝΑΛ) is a political party in Greece, mainly affiliated with the centre-left of the political spectrum. It supports Greece's membership in the European Union. As a political alliance (2018–2026) it included the Panhellenic Socialist Movement (PASOK) and the Movement of Democratic Socialists (KIDISO). It was founded in March 2018, initially as "Movement for Change" (Kínima Allagís) and transformed into a unitary party in 2026.

== History ==
In July 2017, PASOK leader Fofi Gennimata announced the formation of a new unified centre-left party in Greece before the end of the year. In the summer of 2017, Stavros Theodorakis, leader and founder of The River, also decided to participate in the creation of the alliance. After the leadership election, both PASOK–DIMAR and The River planned to continue with separate parliamentary groups until the new alliance's founding congress, scheduled for spring 2018. On 12 November 2017, the first round of leadership elections was held to select the new party's founding leader. Nine initial leadership candidates included Gennimata, Theodorakis, Athens mayor Giorgos Kaminis, PASOK MEP Nikos Androulakis, EDEM party leader Apostolos Pontas, academic Constantinos Gatsios, former PASOK ministers Yiannis Maniatis and Yiannis Ragousis, and Dimitris Tziotis. The candidates reaching the second-round election were Gennimata, with 44.5% of the vote, and Androulakis, with 25.4%. The run-off on 19 November was won by Gennimata, who garnered 56% of the vote. On 28 November 2017, "Movement for Change" (Kinima Allagis) was announced as the preliminary name of the alliance. On 2 December 2017, the party's six-member ruling council was announced, being composed of Gennimata, Theodorakis, Androulakis, Kaminis, DIMAR leader Thanasis Theocharopoulos and former PASOK Prime Minister George Papandreou.

The alliance held its founding congress on 16–18 March in Athens. During the congress, the new logo was unveiled and the alliance's charter and policy program was approved by the overwhelming majority of members.

On 2 July 2018, The River left KINAL. On 20 January 2019, DIMAR also left KINAL due to its position of supporting the Prespa agreement. On 1 June 2019 former PASOK leader Evangelos Venizelos left KINAL, accusing Gennimata of turning the Movement into "SYRIZA's tail".

KINAL increased its obtained seats in the 2019 Greek legislative election compared to Democratic Alignment, becoming Greece's third-largest party and securing 22 seats in the Hellenic Parliament. Following the election, KINAL positioned itself into opposition to the new Mitsotakis Government.

Gennimata died on 25 October 2021 at the Evangelismos Hospital in Athens from cancer.

Elections for the new leader took place in December 2021, with the main candidates being Andreas Loverdos, Nikos Androulakis, and George Papandreou. Nikos Androulakis was elected to lead the KINAL and PASOK on 12 December 2021.

On 1 April 2022, Androulakis announced an internal referendum to be held on 8 May. The referendum was held to decide whether to rename the alliance to "PASOK – Movement of Change" and also to change the emblem. The proposal to change the emblem and name was accepted with a percentage of 95%. The new emblem was unveiled two weeks later, with the traditional green sun having changed hue in a gradient from dark to lighter from left to right.

By Spring of 2023, PASOK – KINAL had dropped in polling numbers from right when Androulakis was elected, but still managed to reach 11.5% of the vote and elect 41 MPs (up from 8% and 22 MPs) in the May 2023 Greek parliamentary election. In the June elections, "reinforced" proportional representation was implemented, meaning that despite a slight increase in vote share, to 12%, the alliance elected just 32 MPs.

In the 2024 European Parliament elections, the party improved its showing (in comparison to 2019), but remained stagnant from the June 2023 parliamentary elections and failed to fulfill its goal of reasserting itself as the official opposition. This triggered a crisis within the party, with the credibility of Nikos Androulakis's leadership being called into question. Some in the party also floated the possibility of an alliance with Syriza in advance of the next legislative elections, including Syriza MP Nikos Pappas and Athens PASOK-aligned mayor Haris Doukas. On 30 June 2024, after internal party pressure, leadership elections were called for 6 October of the same year.

Six candidates were in the ballot at the leadership elections, Nikos Androulakis, Pavlos Geroulanos, Nadia Giannakopoulou, Anna Diamantopoulou, Haris Doukas, and Michalis Katrinis. Androulakis and Doukas made it to the second round, where Androulakis won out on a landslide 20-point victory and was re-elected President. He later became Leader of the Opposition when multiple Syriza MPs left the parliamentary group, making PASOK – KINAL the second-largest party in Parliament.

Owing to the provisions of the new electoral law, which does not allocate seat bonuses to coalitions, the coalition amalgamated into a single party in 2026.

== Pre-unitary composition ==
Prior to its transformation to a unitary party, the alliance was composed of the following parties:

Image	Party	Ideology
	Panhellenic Socialist Movement (PASOK)	Social democracy
	Movement of Democratic Socialists (KIDISO)	Democratic socialism
	Citizens' Movements for Social Democracy	Social democracy
	Union for Democratic National Reform (EDEM)	Social liberalism
	Renewal Left	Progressivism

Former parties:

Image	Party	Ideology	Left
	The River (Potami)	Social liberalism	2018
	Reformers for Democracy and Development	Democratic socialism	2019 (Merged into PASOK)
	Democratic Left (DIMAR)	Democratic socialism	2019

== Election results ==
=== Hellenic Parliament ===
Election	Hellenic Parliament					Rank	Government	Leader
Election	Votes	%	±pp	Seats won	+/−	Rank	Government	Leader
2019	457,519	8.10%	New	22 / 300	New	#3	Opposition	Fofi Gennimata
May 2023	676,166	11.46%	+3.36	41 / 300	▲19	#3	Snap election	Nikos Androulakis
Jun 2023	617,315	11.85%	+0.39	32 / 300	▼9	#3	Opposition	Nikos Androulakis

=== European Parliament ===
European Parliament
Election	Votes	%	±pp	Seats won	+/−	Rank	Leader	EP Group
2019	436,735	7.72%	▼0.30	2 / 21	0	#3	Fofi Gennimata	S&D
2024	508,399	12.79%	▲5.07	3 / 21	▲1	#3	Nikos Androulakis	S&D
