= Afroditi Latinopoulou =

Greek politician (born 1991)

Afroditi Latinopoulou MEP
- Αφροδίτη Λατινοπούλου
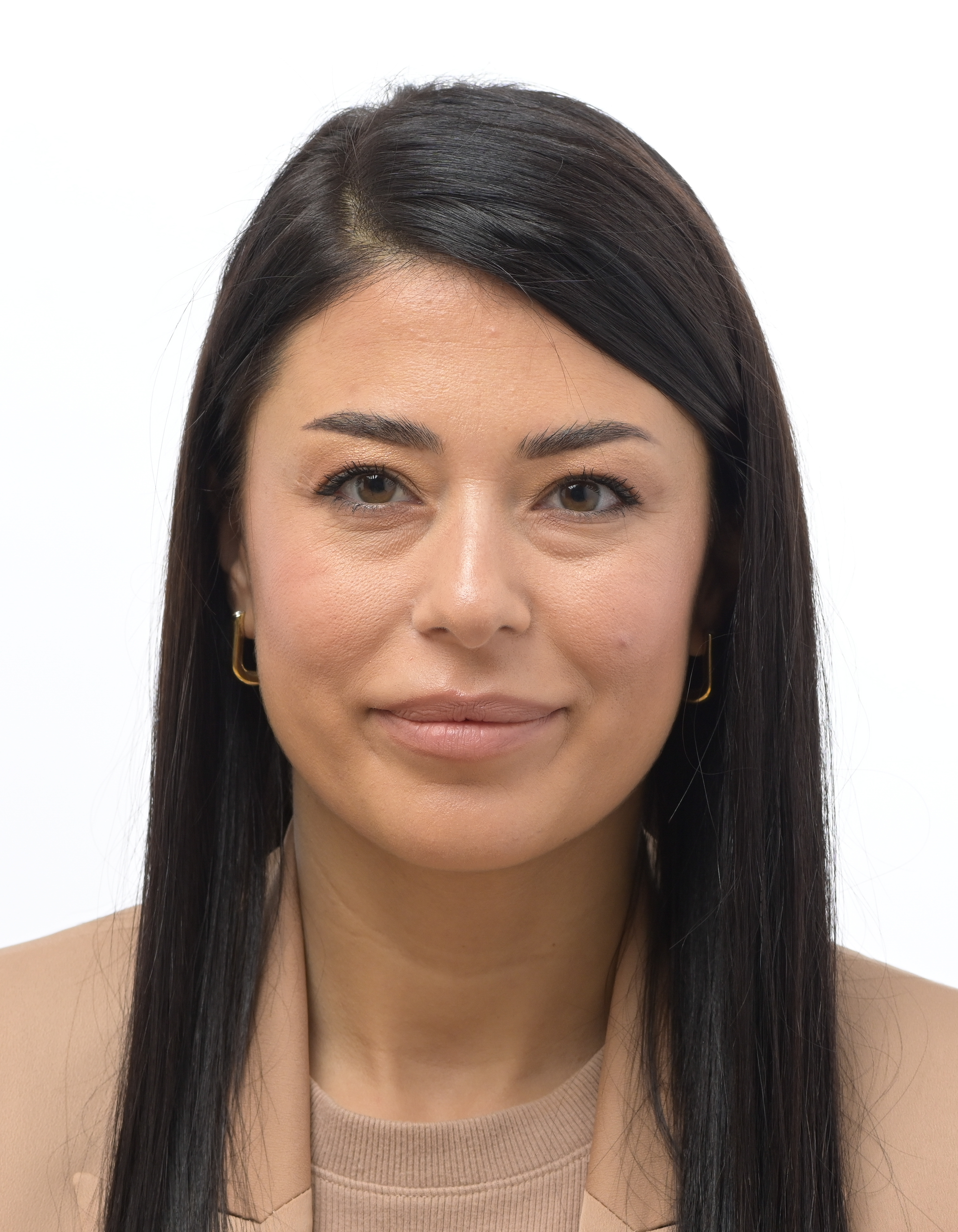
- Official portrait, 2024

President of Voice of Reason
- Incumbent
- Assumed office 23 March 2023
- Preceded by: Party established

Member of the European Parliament
- Incumbent
- Assumed office 16 July 2024
- Constituency: Greece

Personal details
- Born: 29 April 1991 (age 35) Thessaloniki, Greece
- Party: FL (2023–present)
- Other political affiliations: ND (2016–2022); ED (2022); PATRIDA (2022–2023)
- Education: Aristotle University of Thessaloniki
- Occupation: Politician; lawyer
- Website: https://latinopoulou.gr

Afroditi Latinopoulou (Greek: Αφροδίτη Λατινοπούλου; born 29 April 1991) is a Greek politician, founder and leader of the far-right political party Voice of Reason. She was elected as Member of the European Parliament in 2024 European Parliament election.

== Life ==
Afroditi Latinopoulou was born on 29 April 1991 in Thessaloniki. Her maternal roots are in Evros, a periphery in Thrace where she received the highest percentage of votes in the European elections. She was the first child in a family of secondary school teachers. From a young age, she was involved in tennis, a sport in which she won 15 Greek championships and 4 European championships. In 2010, she was ranked 1067th by the Women's Tennis Association. Her sporting career ended in 2013 due to an injury.

She studied at the Law School of Aristotle University of Thessaloniki, graduating in 2017. In 2016, she joined the youth organisation of the New Democracy party (ONNED) and was appointed Secretary of the District. Before her election to the European Parliament, Latinopoulou worked as a lawyer.

== Politics ==
In the legislative elections of 2019, she stood as a candidate for MP in Thessaloniki with the New Democracy. She received 5,297 votes, finishing in 18th place out of a total of 20 candidates.

Afroditi Latinopoulou has been very active on social media, where her posts on political and social issues often conflicted with the official policy of New Democracy. In the summer of 2022, after she made comments on the appearance of Greek TV presenter, Danae Barka, New Democracy issued a statement and proceeded to ban Latinopoulou from running with the party: "Afroditi Latinoopoulou holds no office or position in the organizational chart of New Democracy, either at the local or central level, and will not be a candidate in the next national elections."

In August 2022, Afroditi Latinopoulou announced that she would join the "Patriotic Force for Change" a party of Konstantinos Bogdanos as Vice President. In March 2023 when Bogdanos decided to cooperate for a joint election with the Patriots – Prodromos Emfietzoglou party, Latinoupoulou disagreed and was therefore removed from the coalition.

On 23 March 2023 she founded her own party, "PATRIDA − Afroditi Latinopoulou". However, by decision of the Supreme Civil and Criminal Court of Greece, to which Konstantinos Bogdanos appealed, her new party was excluded from participation in the elections of 21 May 2023 as it was considered that both the name and the symbol of the party were too closely similar to "Patriotic Force for Change".

On 25 May 2024, she announced the renaming of the party as the Voice of Reason and ran for the European Parlament election on 9 June 2024.

== Views ==
Latinopoulou's ideology has been described as ultranationalist, anti-communist, and far-right. She is against abortion rights, opposes LGBT rights, and has expressed homophobic, transphobic, and anti-immigrant views, repeatedly calling for the borders to be closed.

She has also supported the Great Replacement conspiracy theory. In June 2024, she called for Pride Parade to be dissolved, saying, "It is a celebration of vulgarity, emphasising the sexuality of sadomasochists and other various abnormalities in public view."

She has also described homosexuality as "unnatural" and argued that it contradicts religious beliefs, but also compared it to paedophilia. Latinopoulou also supports the death penalty.

She actively supports and collaborates with European politicians often associated with those accused by some of being of the extreme right, such as Marine Le Pen and Giorgia Meloni. She openly supports Donald Trump and has been seen as a representative of Trumpism in Greece. On 29 June 2024, she urged the French people to vote for Marine Le Pen and Jordan Bardella to combat "Islamization", halt immigration, and prevent the demographic "suicide of Europe." She has expressed admiration for Viktor Orbán, stating that he "has zero illegal migrants and listens to and respects his people."

She has repeatedly provoked controversy with her views on the nature of women and sex, and on other human rights issues—views that numerous Greek journalistic organisations have condemned as hate speech. Some highlighted how she conceals her far-right character through constant fearmongering and dog whistling. A notable incident occurred in 2022 when she was banned from running with New Democracy after making comments about Greek TV presenter Danae Barka. In 2022, she shared another video on Instagram condemning drag queen story hour after a kindergarten in Thessaloniki organised one. In November 2024, she delivered a speech in the European Parliament that has been criticised as transphobic. She condemned gender-affirming care, referring to educational content on gender diversity as "lies about 54 genders." Latinopoulou asserted that there are only two genders—male and female—and argued against exposing children to LGBTQ+ topics, stating, "Hands off the children."

In 2021, she was involved in supporting a controversial fertility conference that was cancelled. She has voiced her disagreement with the use of the term "femicide" and criticised left-wing parties for "exploiting victims", including the "glorification", as she referred to, of the two murdered activists Pavlos Fyssas and Zak Kostopoulos.

Latinopoulou, has also opposed the yearly celebration of the Athens Polytechnic Uprising, claiming that students are "brainwashed" about the events.

== Legal issues ==
In September 2025, it emerged that the European Public Prosecutor's Office (EPPO) was reportedly investigating whether her party, Voice of Reason, was lawfully established. Reports indicated that the complaint to the European authorities was filed by her former colleague and MP, Konstantinos Bogdanos.

In September 2026, the European Parliament voted to waive Latinopoulou’s parliamentary immunity, allowing judicial proceedings in Greece to continue over allegations concerning the establishment of Voice of Reason. The case relates to claims that fictitious or forged signatures were included among those submitted in the party’s founding declaration, which under Greek law requires the signatures of at least 200 eligible voters. The European Parliament did not rule on the substance of the allegations, but stated that it had found no evidence of fumus persecutionis, or indications that the proceedings had been initiated to damage Latinopoulou’s political activity, and approved the waiver on 15 September. Latinopoulou denied the allegations and stated that she wanted the case to be examined by the courts. The following day, during the European Parliament’s State of the Union debate, she delivered a strongly worded attack on European Commission president Ursula von der Leyen, accusing her of harming Europeans through the European Union’s migration, climate and social policies. Latinopoulou described von der Leyen as the “greatest racist against Europeans”, told her that she had “ruined” Europe, and criticised what she called the EU’s “green madness”, “woke agenda” and the “Islamisation” of Europe.
