= National Accord =

National Accord Εθνική Συμφωνία Ethniki Simfonia
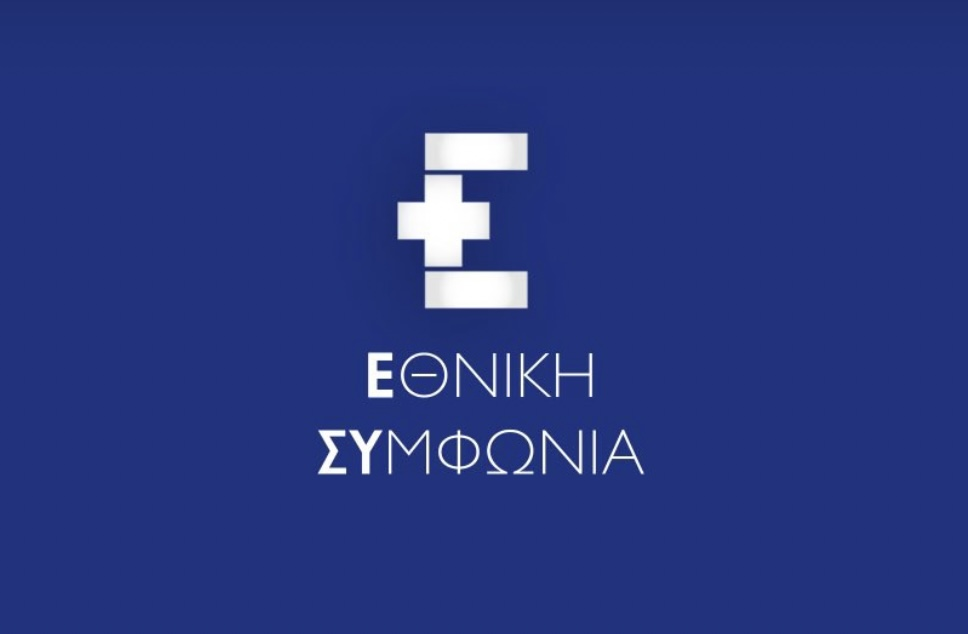
- Leader: Konstantinos Bogdanos
- Founded: 5 April 2022
- Dissolved: 26 September 2022
- Split from: New Democracy
- Succeeded by: Patriotic Force for Change
- Ideology: National conservatism; Right-wing populism; Conservatism; Anti-communism; Anti-Islam; Anti-immigration
- Political position: Right-wing to far-right
- National affiliation: National Creation

National Accord (Greek: Εθνική Συμφωνία) was a Greek political movement, initially founded in 2022 as a right-wing think tank by Konstantinos Bogdanos after he was expelled from the New Democracy parliamentary group. It later became a political party, the Patriotic Force for Change, after Bogdanos was expelled from the National Creation political alliance.
