= Patriots.eu =

Far-right European political party

- Abbreviation: Patriots.eu
- President: Santiago Abascal (ES)
- Founded: 2014; 12 years ago, as MENF
- Split from: European Alliance for Freedom
- Headquarters: 75 Boulevard Haussmann, 75008 Paris, France
- Think tank: Patriots for Europe Foundation
- Membership (22 December 2025): 5
- Ideology: Nationalism; Ultranationalism; National conservatism; Right-wing populism; Euroscepticism
- Political position: Far-right
- European Parliament group: Patriots for Europe (since 2024) (Note: The party was formerly part of Identity and Democracy (2019–2024) and Europe of Nations and Freedom (2014–2019).)
- Colours: Navy blue
- European Parliament: 81 / 720
- European Commission: 0 / 27
- European Council: 1 / 27
- EU lower/unicameral houses: 537 / 6,217
- EU upper houses: 82 / 1,459

Website
- patriots.eu

Patriots.eu (French: Patriotes.eu), formerly known as the Identity and Democracy Party (ID or ID Party) and the Movement for a Europe of Nations and Freedom (MENF), is a far-right nationalist, populist, and Eurosceptic European political party founded in 2014. Its Members of the European Parliament sat in the Europe of Nations and Freedom group from 2015 to 2019, then in the Identity and Democracy group between 2019 and 2024; following the 2024 European Parliament election, all of its MEPs sit within the Patriots for Europe group.

== History ==
=== 2010s ===
In the aftermath of the 2014 European Parliament election, parties affiliated with the European Alliance for Freedom unsuccessfully attempted to form a political group of the European Parliament. After unsuccessfully forming a group, National Rally, Northern League, Freedom Party of Austria, Vlaams Belang and the Civic Conservative Party formed MENF.

Later in 2014, they decided to create a new European-level structure, which became the Movement for a Europe of Nations and Freedom. The Dutch Party for Freedom (PVV) chose not to participate in this European political party, as it declined to be funded by the European Union. The Polish Congress of the New Right (KNP), initially claimed that it would be part of the new alliance, but was accused in a press release by the French National Rally of spreading false claims in the Polish and Austrian media. Ultimately the KNP took part in the creation of the party's new parliamentary group as its former leader Janusz Korwin-Mikke was evicted from the party to be replaced by Michal Marusik.

It was recognised by the European Parliament (EP) in 2015. Its maximum grant by the EP for this year is €1,170,746 plus €621,677 for its affiliated political foundation, the Fondation pour une Europe des Nations et des Libertés.

On 16 June 2015, the Europe of Nations and Freedom parliamentary group was created in the European Parliament with members of the MENF (RN, FPÖ, LN, VB) as well as the PVV, Poland's KNP and a former member of UKIP, Janice Atkinson.

The 1st congress of the movement was held on 28 June 2015 in Perpignan, France, gathering some MEPs from the National Rally as well as a few of its local and national representatives members; the objective of this meeting was mainly about making the 1st year of action of the National Rally's MEPs in review.

On 15 September 2015, the Flemish Vlaams Belang (VB) and the movement organised a colloquium dealing with sovereignty which took place in the Flemish Parliament with VB's leader Tom Van Grieken, MEP Gerolf Annemans, VB's member Barbara Pas and National Rally's leader Marine Le Pen. All of the Flemish parties approved Marine Le Pen's visit at the Flemish Parliament although the speaker of the Flemish Parliament Jan Peumans (N-VA) decided not to be part of this colloquium.

On 21 November 2015, MENF's think tank "Foundation for a Europe of Nations and Freedom" organised a colloquium ("L'euro, un échec inéluctable?") dealing with Euro and how it might be an inescapable failure. Jacques Sapir took part in this colloquium among others. The FENF, chaired by Gerolf Annemans, organised another colloquium on 2 April 2016 in Paris dealing with union representation and the development of professional organisations in France.

The third colloquium of the movement took place on 4 March 2016 in the Flemish Parliament with VB's leader Tom Van Grieken and PVV's leader Geert Wilders. This colloquium entitled "Freedom" ("Vrijheid") dealt with liberties in Europe and how they would be threatened by immigration from "countries with cultures which are fundamentally different [from the European ones]".

The movement's member parties and allies met in July 2016 in Vienna, in an event hosted by Austria's FPÖ. The French National Rally, Matteo Salvini's Northern League, the German AfD, Belgium's Vlaams Belang and the Dutch Party for Freedom were present, among other independent politicians and smaller European parties.

According to Politico, the movement owed in 2016 the European Parliament €535,818. The reasons given by Politico were the forbidden use of European grants by the MENF party to finance national political parties and referendum campaigns. The party strongly denied these allegations by saying that they just had to give the unused EU funds back to the European Parliament.

In 2019, the party expanded by including the Estonian Conservative People's Party in February, We Are Family in March and the League in September. After the 2019 European Parliament election the party re-branded to the Identity and Democracy Party as the European political party for the Identity and Democracy Group in the Ninth European Parliament.

=== 2020s ===
In July 2020, the Portuguese nationalist party, Chega joined.

In July 2023, Alternative for Germany (AfD) officially joined the ID Party, having been a member of the ID EU Parliament Group since 2019.

In January 2024, the Slovak National Party and the Bulgarian Revival joined the ID Party. However, the latter soon left.

In June 2024, the AfD left the ID Party to pre-empt its expulsion.

In August 2024, the ID Party renamed itself to Patriots.eu, with a new manifesto issued. The new statutes published by the European Parliament revealed that Vlaams Belang's Gerolf Annemans would continue as President, with the National Rally's Catherine Griset receiving the Treasurer position. Freedom and Direct Democracy and the Slovak National Party were no longer listed as members, with the former instead joining Europe of Sovereign Nations.

In September 2024, the Hungarian Fidesz, the Greek Voice of Reason, the Spanish Vox and Czech ANO were announced as new members of Patriots.eu.

At the Patriots.eu's general assembly in November 2024, Vox leader Santiago Abascal was elected the new president of the party, succeeding Gerolf Annemans, while the Polish National Movement and the Czech Přísaha and Motorists for Themselves parties were announced as new member parties.

In February 2025, Patriots.eu hosted a rally in Madrid with the theme 'Make Europe Great Again', which was addressed by Marine Le Pen, Geert Wilders, Santiago Abascal, Matteo Salvini, Andrej Babiš, Martin Helme, Krzysztof Bosak and other party leaders. Following the rally, Israeli ruling party Likud was announced as the first Observer member of Patriots.eu.

On 10 March 2025, the Danish People’s Party and Latvia First were added as members of Patriots.eu.

== Platform ==
The Patriots.eu's platform is based around building a Europe that is united, rejecting the complete dismantling of the European Union, however is critical of the current activities of the European Union which it accuses of being ultra-liberal and too bureaucratic. The party platform wishes to build a Europe that is composed of nations that maintain their sovereignty and identity.

== Membership ==
=== Full members ===
The following national delegations are part of the Patriots.eu:
Country	Party	Leader	Political group	European Parliament (Note: The number of MEPs listed below may not match the total number of MEPs of the European party, as it does not include MEPs who join as individual members.)	National lower house	National upper house	Position in national legislature
Austria	Freedom Party of Austria; Freiheitliche Partei Österreichs (FPÖ)	Herbert Kickl	Patriots for Europe	6 / 20	57 / 183	16 / 60	Opposition
Belgium	Flemish Interest; Vlaams Belang (VB)	Tom Van Grieken	Patriots for Europe	3 / 22	20 / 150	7 / 60	Opposition
Czech Republic	ANO 2011; ANO 2011 (ANO)	Andrej Babiš	Patriots for Europe	7 / 21	76 / 200	11 / 81	Government
Czech Republic	Motorists for Themselves; Motoristé sobě (AUTO)	Petr Macinka	Patriots for Europe	1 / 21	6 / 200	0 / 81	Government
Denmark	Danish People's Party; Dansk Folkeparti (DF)	Morten Messerschmidt	Patriots for Europe	1 / 15	16 / 179		Opposition
Estonia	Conservative People's Party of Estonia; Eesti Konservatiivne Rahvaerakond (EKRE)	Martin Helme	None	0 / 7	10 / 101		Opposition
France	National Rally; Rassemblement national (RN)	Jordan Bardella	Patriots for Europe	29 / 81	118 / 577	12 / 348	Opposition
Greece	Voice of Reason; Φωνή Λογικής (ΦΛ)	Afroditi Latinopoulou	Patriots for Europe	1 / 21	0 / 300		Extra-parliamentary
Hungary	Fidesz – Hungarian Civic Alliance; Fidesz – Magyar Polgári Szövetség	Viktor Orbán	Patriots for Europe	10 / 21	44 / 199		Opposition
Italy	League for Salvini Premier; Lega per Salvini Premier	Matteo Salvini	Patriots for Europe	8 / 76	61 / 400	29 / 200	Government
Italy	Northern League; Lega Nord	Matteo Salvini	Patriots for Europe	8 / 76	61 / 400	29 / 200	Government
Latvia	Latvia First; Latvija pirmajā vietā (LPV)	Ainārs Šlesers	Patriots for Europe	1 / 9	8 / 100		Opposition
Netherlands	Party for Freedom; Partij voor de Vrijheid (PVV)	Geert Wilders	Patriots for Europe	6 / 31	26 / 150	4 / 75	Opposition
Poland	National Movement; Ruch Narodowy (RN)	Krzysztof Bosak	Patriots for Europe	2 / 53	7 / 460	0 / 100	Opposition
Portugal	Enough! Chega (CH)	André Ventura	Patriots for Europe	2 / 21	60 / 230		Opposition
Spain	Vox; Vox	Santiago Abascal	Patriots for Europe	6 / 61	33 / 350	3 / 265	Opposition

=== Observer members ===
Country	Party	Leader	National lower houses	National upper houses	Position in national legislature
Israel	Likud – National Liberal Movement הַלִּיכּוּד – תנועה לאומית ליברלית (הַלִּיכּוּד)	Benjamin Netanyahu	32 / 120		Government

=== Former members ===
- Bulgaria: Volya (2018–2022)
- Bulgaria: Revival (2024)
- Czech Republic: Civic Conservative Party (2014–2016)
- Czech Republic: Freedom and Direct Democracy (2015–2024)
- Czech Republic: Přísaha Civic Movement (2024–2026)
- Germany: Alternative for Germany (2023–2024)
- Greece: New Right (2018–2023)
- Poland: Congress of the New Right (2014–2019)
- Slovakia: We Are Family (2019–2023)
- Slovakia: Slovak National Party (2024)
- United Kingdom: For Britain (2019–2022)

=== Individual members ===
Patriots.eu also includes a number of individual members, although, as most other European parties, it has not sought to develop mass individual membership.

Below is the evolution of individual membership of Patriots.eu since 2019.

== Funding ==
As a registered European political party, Patriots.eu is entitled to European public funding, which it has received continuously since its first application in 2015.

Below is the evolution of European public funding received by Patriots.eu.

In line with the Regulation on European political parties and European political foundations, Patriots.eu also raises private funds to co-finance its activities. As of 2025, European parties must raise at least 10% of their reimbursable expenditure from private sources, while the rest can be covered using European public funding. (Note: For the purpose of European party funding, "contributions" refer to financial or in-kind support provided by party members, while "donations" refer to the same but provided by non-members.)

Below is the evolution of contributions and donations received by Patriots.eu.

== Relations with other parties ==
The national conservative Civic Conservative Party was a founding member of the Movement for a Europe of Nations and Freedom, but left the group in 2016.

In February 2016, leader of the FPÖ Heinz-Christian Strache was invited by the anti-Euro and anti-immigration party AfD and its leader Frauke Petry to their congress in Düsseldorf, and the AfD also announced a cooperation pact with the FPÖ. In April 2016, AfD's vice-president Alexander Gauland also proposed an alliance with Marine Le Pen's National Rally. Therefore, AfD's MEP Marcus Pretzell joined the Europe of Nations and Freedom group on 30 April 2016. The AfD was a member of the ID Party's European Parliament political group, Identity and Democracy, until 2024. The Danish People's Party (DPP) and the Finns Party were also members of the Identity and Democracy political group, and the DPP has participated in ID Party events such as their 2019 Antwerp Conference.

The Dutch Party for Freedom (PVV), despite not being a member of MENF, participated in its previous political group in the European Parliament, ENF. Party leader Geert Wilders also attended ID Party events and appears in its promotional material. The Blue Party, led by former AfD leader Frauke Petry, and the UK Independence Party, then led by Gerard Batten, were both members of the ENF group. However, neither party became an official member of MENF despite being ideologically aligned.

Patriots.eu leaders also have public political relations of some kind with Brothers of Italy (FdI). On 24 October 2015, MENF's leader and vice-president of the National Rally Louis Aliot met the current president of Brothers of Italy, Giorgia Meloni in Trieste for a conference on immigration. Also in 2015 Marine Le Pen praised SVP's victory during the 2015 Swiss election although the Swiss party does not have official links with the movement. The movement launched an anti-immigration campaign in 2015 just like the SVP's campaign during Swiss referendum on immigration in 2014. In February 2017, French MEP Edouard Ferrand met with Vox's leaders during a meeting of the Spanish right-wing party. Back in 2016, Vox's president Santiago Abascal had already met with one of the National Rally's leaders, Louis Aliot, also one of MENF's MEPs in the European Parliament.

On 24 January 2020, the ID Party's think tank, the ID Foundation, held an event in London that was addressed by Brexit Party MEP Robert Rowland.

Patriots.eu have supported the Visegrád Group of Poland, Hungary, Czech Republic and Slovakia for their opposition to the European Union's migrant policies in response to the European migrant crisis. Then-ID Party launched a petition to support the ruling parties of these nations. Law and Justice and Fidesz expressed populist and anti-immigrant rhetoric similar to members of ID Party, resulting in mutual support, especially from Viktor Orbán and his party. Matteo Salvini and Marine Le Pen hoped to forge strong relations with Law and Justice and Fidesz prior to the 2019 European Parliament election. From July 2021 to January 2022, most ID Party members participated in a series of declarations and summits alongside Fidesz, Law and Justice, Vox, Greek Solution and other European nationalist parties.

In October 2021, a delegation of Identity and Democracy representatives visited Slovenian Prime Minister Janez Janša, the leader of the Slovenian Democratic Party.

In 2022, Fidesz sent representatives, including Justice Minister Judit Varga, to address ID Party events.

In October 2023, then-ID Party hosted a gathering in Rome with representatives of Fidesz, the U.S. Republican Party, the Polish National Movement and the Israeli Likud.

On 13 October 2023, Europe Elects revealed SOS Romania's intention to join the ID Group as well, although the party did not join any group in the European Parliament in the end. On 30 October 2023, the Croatian Homeland Movement also expressed openness to joining ID, following a meeting with leading figures within ID, though it ultimately joined European Conservatives and Reformists in July 2024.

In November 2023, ID member parties, along with Fidesz and Vox, participated in a conference hosted by the Serbian People's Party (SNP). A politician from the Serbian People's Party, Jovan Palalić, was later interviewed by the ID Foundation, stating that the SNP "works with the parties in the Identity and Democracy bloc".

In December 2023, Bulgarian Revival leader Kostadin Kostadinov, Alliance for the Union of Romanians (AUR) leader George Simion, and a representative from the Confederation of the Polish Crown addressed an ID rally in Florence. However, Simion clarified AUR's intention to join the European Conservatives and Reformists a day prior to the rally.

In March 2024, former U.S. Republican presidential candidate Vivek Ramaswamy addressed an ID rally in Rome.

In February 2025, a delegation from Patriots.eu visited Israel to reinforce ties with Likud, meeting with Transport Minister Miri Regev, Diaspora Affairs Minister Amichai Chikli, Agriculture Minister Avi Dichter, Chairman of the Shomron Regional Council Yossi Dagan and Speaker of the Knesset Amir Ohana.

In February 2025, Argentinian President Javier Milei of the La Libertad Avanza party, Vente Venezuela leader María Corina Machado, and Kevin Roberts, president of the Heritage Foundation, addressed a Patriots.eu rally in Madrid.

In February 2025, a delegation from Patriots.eu's think tank, the Patriots for Europe Foundation, visited India to meet with officials from the Bharatiya Janata Party. Following this, the Patriots for Europe Foundation hosted BJP National Spokesperson Shazia Ilmi for a conference on EU-India relations in Brussels in June 2025.

In March 2026, Georgian Foreign Minister Maka Bochorishvili of the Georgian Dream party addressed a panel during the first Patriots.eu Assembly in Budapest. Georgian Dream subsequently joined the newly formed Patriots for Europe group in the Congress of Local and Regional Authorities.

== Structure ==
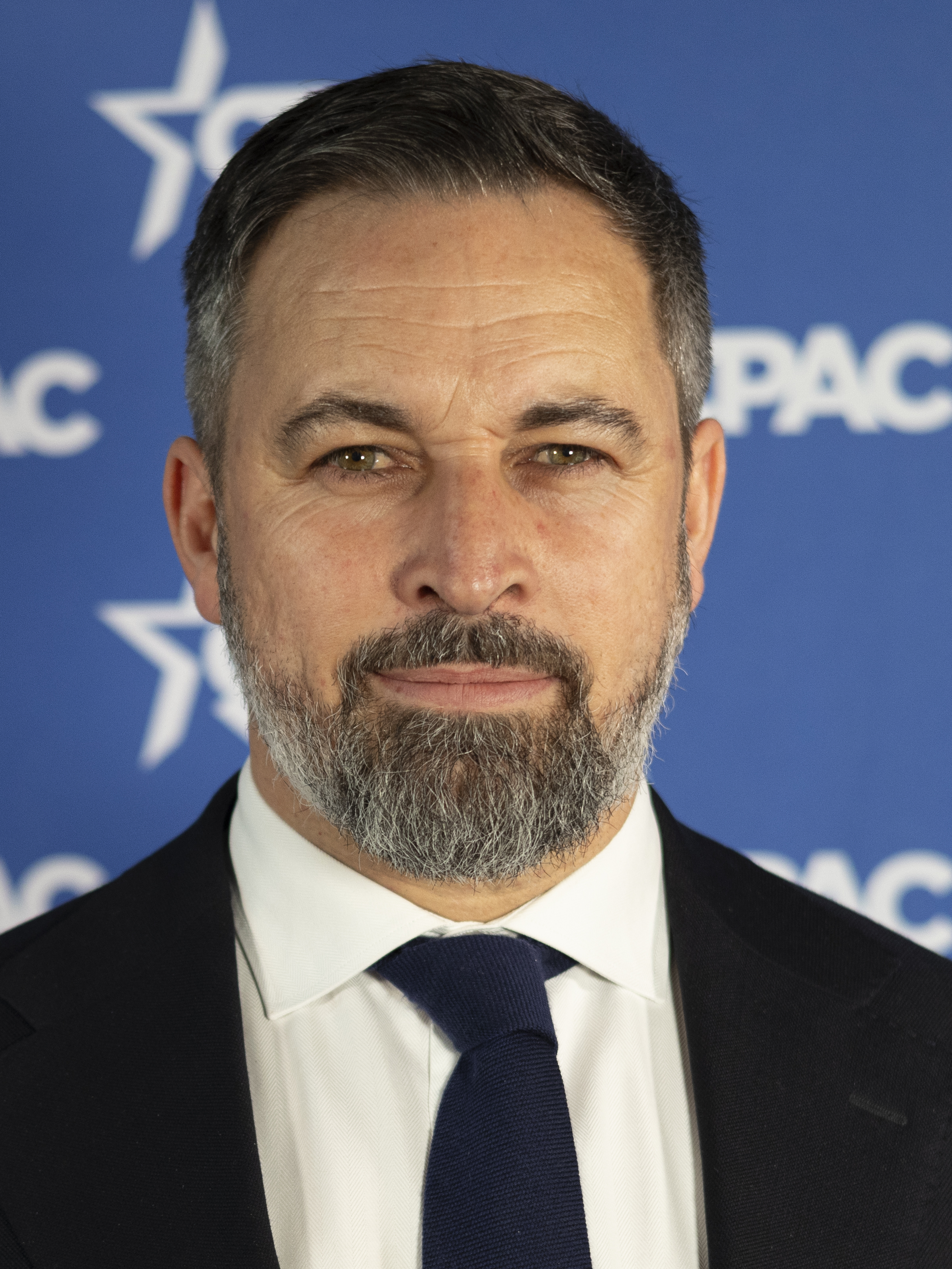
Santiago Abascal, president of Patriots.eu

=== Party leadership ===
==== President ====
- Santiago Abascal (Vox, Spain)

==== Vice President ====
- Kinga Gál (Fidesz, Hungary)

==== Treasurer ====
- Catherine Griset (RN, France)

==== Members of the Bureau ====
The current members of the party Bureau are:

- Marine Le Pen (RN, France)
- Harald Vilimsky (FPÖ, Austria)
- Marco Campomenosi (Lega, Italy)
- Gerolf Annemans (VB, Belgium)
- Ricardo Dias Pinto (Chega, Portugal)
- Ondřej Knotek (ANO, Czech Republic)
- Sebastiaan Stöteler (PVV, Netherlands)
- Martin Helme (EKRE, Estonia)
- Jorge Martin Frias (Vox, Spain)
- Michał Wawer (RN, Poland)
- Anders Vistisen, (DF, Denmark)
- Afroditi Latinopoulou, (FL, Greece)

=== Foundation leadership ===
==== President ====
- András László (Fidesz, Hungary)

==== Treasurer ====
- Ľudovít Goga (We Are Family, Slovakia)

==== Members of the Office ====
- Mathilde Androuët (RN, France)
- Thierry Mariani (RN, France)
- Anders Vistisen (DF, Denmark)
- António Tânger Corrêa (Chega, Portugal)
- Susanna Ceccardi (Lega, Italy)
- Ádám Kavecsánszki (Fidesz, Hungary)
- Tom Vandendriessche (VB, Belgium)
- Harald Vilimsky (FPÖ, Austria)
- Tomasz Buczek (RN, Poland)
- Emmanouil Koulas (FL, Greece)
- Eduardo Cader (Vox, Spain)

=== History ===
==== Party presidents ====
- 2015–2017: Louis Aliot (France)
- 2017–2019: Jean-François Jalkh (France)
- 2019–2024: Gerolf Annemans (Belgium)
- 2024–present: Santiago Abascal (Spain)

== Representation in European institutions ==
Organisation	Institution	Number of seats
European Union	European Parliament	81 / 720 (11%)
European Union	European Commission	0 / 27 (0%)
European Union	European Council (Heads of Government)	1 / 27 (4%)
European Union	Council of the European Union (Participation in Government)	
European Union	Committee of the Regions	0 / 329 (0%)
Council of Europe (as part of ECPA)	Parliamentary Assembly	101 / 612 (17%)

== See also ==
- Patriots for Europe
- European political party
- Authority for European Political Parties and European Political Foundations
- European political foundation
