= Patriotic Force for Change =

Patriotic Force for Change Πατριωτική Δύναμη Αλλαγής
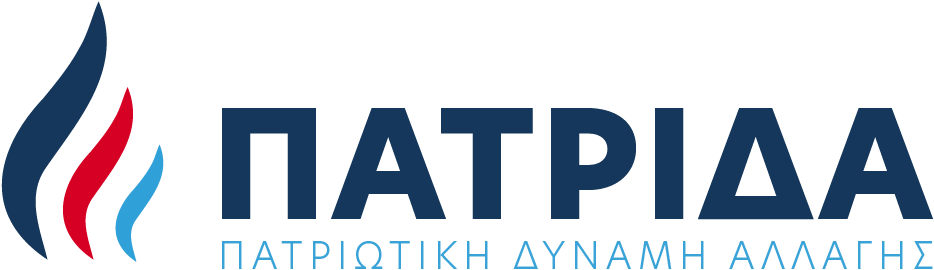
- Abbreviation: PATRIDA
- President: Konstantinos Bogdanos
- Founder: Konstantinos Bogdanos
- Founded: 26 September 2022
- Dissolved: 5 December 2023
- Split from: New Democracy; National Creation
- Preceded by: National Accord
- Youth wing: PATRIDA Youth
- Ideology: National conservatism Social conservatism Economic liberalism Right-wing populism Anti-immigration
- Political position: Right-wing to far-right
- Religion: Greek Orthodox Church
- National affiliation: Patriotic Coalition
- Colours: Dark blue Red; Light blue

The Patriotic Force for Change (Greek: Πατριωτική Δύναμη Αλλαγής, romanized: Patriotikí Dýnami Allagís, abbreviated to ΠΑΤΡΙΔΑ) was a Greek political party founded in September 2022. Its acronym is read πατρίδα (patrída), the Greek word for "fatherland".

Its president and founder was Konstantinos Bogdanos, a right-wing journalist who had been elected to the Hellenic Parliament at the 2019 election with New Democracy. Prior to the May 2023 election, the party was represented in parliament by Bogdanos, who sat as an independent for the Athens A constituency after his expulsion from the governing party in October 2021.

In January 2023, Bogdanos announced an electoral alliance with Wave of Hellenism, a political alliance originally established by nationalist parties including Front Line, LEPEN, National Popular Consciousness and Spartans.

In March 2023, a new electoral alliance with the Patriotic Union and several minor nationalist parties was announced, with Bogdanos assuming the role of vice-president. The Hellenism Committee, the Hellenic Section of the United States Republican Party and the Hellenic-Russian-Armenian Friendship Association expressed their support. Afroditi Latinopoulou, a lawyer and co-founder of the party, was expelled by Bogdanos after her refusal to participate in the new alliance. A few days later, Latinopoulou announced the creation of a new party called Πατρίδα (Patrída) with the support of Wave of Hellenism, leading to a dispute with Bogdanos over the party's name and symbol. The controversy resulted in both parties being excluded from the May 2023 election by the Supreme Court. They were subsequently permitted to participate in the June 2023 election, after Bogdanos announced his party's membership in the Patriotic Coalition and Latinopoulou changed her party's name to Voice of Reason.

After the Patriotic Coalition failed to meet the electoral threshold, Bogdanos announced the end of his political career and his return to journalism, thus leaving the party inactive without further details about its function.

== Ideology ==
The Patriotic Force for Change, according to its constitution, was defined as right-wing, conservative, bourgeois and economically liberal. Some media characterized it as far-right, a label rejected by Bogdanos, who said that "PATRIDA does not identify with Golden Dawn." It was considered a pro-Western and pro-European party, despite its affinity with the Eurosceptic European Conservatives and Reformists Party. The party slogan was "Homeland, Religion, Family and Economic Freedom."
