= Patriots – Prodromos Emfietzoglou =

Patriots Πατριώτες
- Abbreviation: P–PE
- Leader: Prodromos Eleftheros
- Founder: Prodromos Emfietzoglou
- Founded: 17 November 2021
- Dissolved: 2024
- Headquarters: Attica, Melissia, Sismanogliou Street 20
- Youth wing: National Youth of Patriots
- Ideology: National conservatism Anti-immigration
- Political position: Far-right
- Religion: Greek Orthodox Church
- Colours: Navy blue

Website
- www.patriotespe.gr

The Patriots (Greek: Πατριώτες, romanized: Patriótes), formerly known as Patriotic Force – Prodromos Emfietzoglou (PD; Greek: Πατριωτική Δύναμη – Πρόδρομος Εμφιετζόγλου, romanized: Patriotikí Dínami – Pródromos Emfietzóglou), and as Patriotic Union – Prodromos Emfietzoglou (PE; Greek: Πατριωτική Ένωση – Πρόδρομος Εμφιετζόγλου, romanized: Patriotikí Énosis – Pródromos Emfietzóglou), was a Greek political party founded on 17 November 2021 by industrialist Prodromos Emfietzoglou, who changed his name to Prodromos Eleftheros in January 2025.

== History ==
The party was founded with the name Panhellenic Patriotic Union (PPE, Greek: Πανελλήνια Πατριωτική Ένωση) by 84-year-old Prodromos Emfietzoglou on 17 November 2021. Previously, Emfietzoglou was the owner of the construction company "Mechaniki" until its bankruptcy in 2010.

In March 2023, the Patriotic Union and the Patriotic Force for Change party of Konstantinos Bogdanos decided to cooperate in the 2023 legislative election and thus was put vice-president of the coalition. Prior to this, the Hellenic Revolution, Patriotic Association, ELKIS, United Greece-New Europe and National Patriotic Party of Greece agreed to take part in the coalition of the Patriotic Union. The Greek section of the US Republican Party and Hellenic-Russian-Armenian Friendship Association also expressed support for the coalition. The cooperation of Bogdanos with the Patriotic Union caused a split in the Patriotic Force for Change.

The party's participation in the 2023 election was not accepted by the Supreme Civil and Criminal Court of Greece after an appeal by Patriotic Union-Greek Popular Rally, a minor party with an almost identical name that had participated in the 2014 European Parliament election. Another reason was the use of the Vergina Sun as the party's symbol, which is considered a national symbol and therefore can't be used as an identifying symbol of a political party.

Consequently, the party got renamed to Patriotic Force – Prodromos Emfietzoglou and changed its emblem from the star of Vergina to the initial letters of the leader's name into a square, in order to take part in the next election.

On May 31, 2023, the party created a new coalition with the parties Free Again, Movement 21 and Now All Together called Patriotic Coalition.

On October 31, 2023, the party was renamed to Patriots - Prodromos Emfietzoglou; the party also updated its logo to one that shows a nuclear family holding hands together.

In the 2024 European Parliament elections Ilias Kasidiaris declared that he would vote for retired artillery officer Charalambos Giotis, head of a municipal faction in the municipality of Athens that was on the Patriots party's ballot. Subsequently, the candidate received almost double the number of crosses from the party's president himself, Prodromos Emfietzoglou.

== Ideology ==
The party was described as far-right.

The party opposed the policies of both New Democracy and Syriza concerning immigration. "The Patriotic Union will not allow our country to become a country ruled by Muslims", Emfietzoglou said in a statement in March 2023.

== Election results ==
=== Hellenic Parliament ===
Election	Hellenic Parliament					Rank	Government	Leader
Election	Votes	%	±pp	Seats won	+/−	Rank	Government	Leader
Jun 2023 (Note: Run as part of the Patriotic Coalition (PD-PE, EX, K21 and TOLMA).)	25,990	0.50%	New	0 / 300	New	9th	Extra-parliamentary	Prodromos Emfietzoglou

=== European Parliament ===
European Parliament
Election	Votes	%	±pp	Seats won	+/−	Rank	Leader	EP Group
2024	56,100	1.41%	New	0 / 21	New	12th	Prodromos Emfietzoglou	−
