= Marco Zanni =

Italian politician (born 1986)

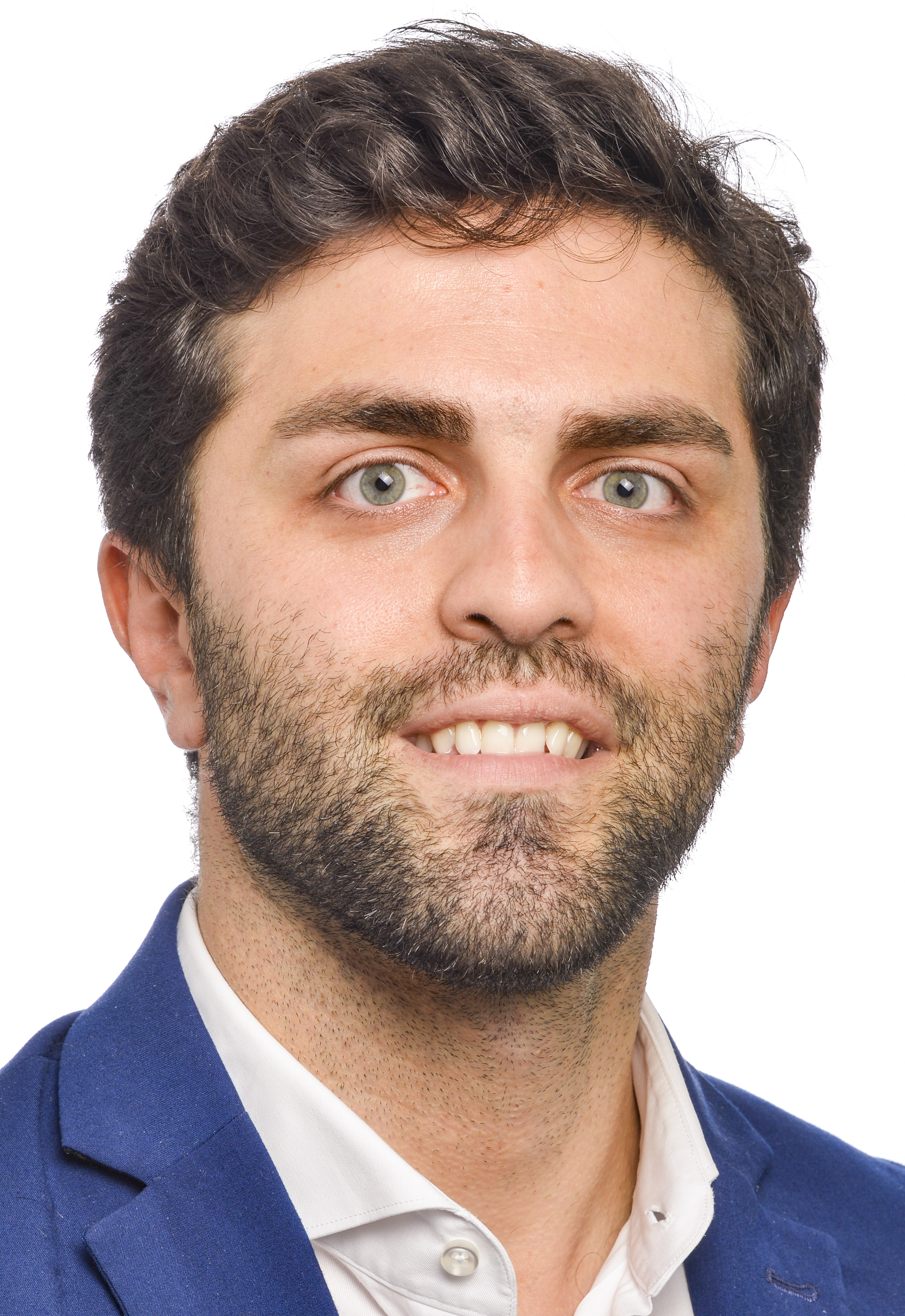

President of the Identity and Democracy group in the European Parliament
- In office 2 July 2019 – 15 July 2024
- Preceded by: Nicolas Bay (ENF)
- Succeeded by: Jordan Bardella (PfE)

Member of the European Parliament for North-West Italy
- In office 1 July 2014 – 15 July 2024
- Parliamentary group: EFDD (2014–2017); ENF (2017–2019); ID (2019–2024)

Personal details
- Born: 11 July 1986 (age 40) Lovere, Italy
- Party: League (since 2018)
- Other political affiliations: M5S (2014–2017)
- Education: Bocconi University; ESADE Business School

Marco Zanni (born 11 July 1986) is an Italian politician who presided over the Identity and Democracy (ID) group in the European Parliament between 2019 and 2024. He has served as a Member of the European Parliament (MEP) since 2014, first elected as a member of the Five Star Movement, then reelected for the League in 2019.

== Biography ==
Marco Zanni was born in Lovere, near Bergamo, in 1986. He graduated in business administration at the Bocconi University of Milan and then studied at the ESADE Business School in Barcelona. After completing his postgraduate degree, he was hired by Banca IMI, an Italian investment bank.

In May 2014, he stood in the European Parliament election for the populist and Eurosceptic Five Star Movement. He was elected in the North-West Italy constituency, with 16,940 personal preferences.

On 11 January 2017, after the failed attempt of the M5S to join the liberal ALDE group, Zanni left the movement, joining the right-wing Europe of Nations and Freedom (ENF) group. On 15 May 2018, he became a member of the League, the right-wing populist party led by Matteo Salvini.

Zanni was re-elected in the 2019 European election, with 18,019 votes. The election was characterized by a strong showing of the League, that became the most-voted party in Italy, with more than 34% of votes. On 13 June, he was appointed leader of the right wing Identity and Democracy (ID) group.

He did not run in the 2024 European elections. Later the Identity and Democracy group was dissolved and reformed into Patriots for Europe, the role of Chairman of the group would be taken by Jordan Bardella.
