= Voice of Reason (political party) =

Political party in Greece

Voice of Reason Φωνή Λογικής
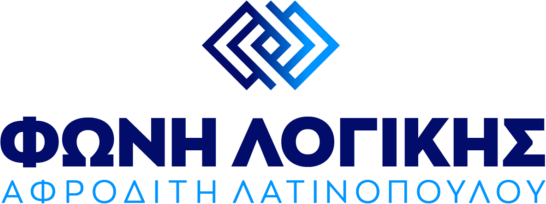
- Abbreviation: FL
- President: Afroditi Latinopoulou
- Founder: Afroditi Latinopoulou
- Founded: 23 March 2023; 3 years ago
- Split from: Patriotic Force for Change
- Ideology: Ultranationalism; Ultraconservatism; Euroscepticism
- Political position: Far-right
- European affiliation: Patriots.eu
- European Parliament group: Patriots for Europe
- Colors: Navy blue Light blue
- Hellenic Parliament: 0 / 300
- European Parliament: 1 / 21

Website
- fonilogikis.gr

Voice of Reason (Greek: Φωνή Λογικής, romanized: Foní Logikís, FL) is a far-right political party in Greece. It was established in 2023 by Afroditi Latinopoulou, a lawyer and former tennis player.

== History ==
The party was originally founded as "Homeland" (Greek: Πατρίδα, romanized: Patrída), but was excluded from the May 2023 Greek legislative election by the Supreme Court due to a dispute over the name and symbol of the Patriotic Force for Change (PATRIDA) party, to which Latinopoulou had previously belonged. The party was subsequently renamed and took part in the snap June 2023 Greek legislative election, receiving 0.43% of the vote. In the 2024 European Parliament election, it received just over the electoral threshold of 3%, electing its leader Afroditi Latinopoulou as an MEP. On 8 July 2024 the party joined the Patriots for Europe group in the European Parliament.

== Political positions ==
Immigration rates is a critical issue for supporters of Voice of Reason, whose party promotes closed controls and strict asylum criteria. The manifesto opposes granting citizenship to illegal migrants and emphasizes deportation for those without legal status. It also proposes bilateral agreements with culturally aligned countries for temporary labour needs. The demographic challenge is addressed through economic incentives for Greek families to have more children, such as no income tax for families of four or more children highlighting the importance of supporting large families while rejecting immigration as a long-term solution to population decline for reasons of avoiding ethnic Greek replacement in Greece. When it comes to matters concerning the legality of abortion, the party supports the current Greek laws, which restricts most abortion in the third trimester but allowing it for any and all cases in the first trimester and most cases for the second

The party manifesto addresses LGBTQ+ issues by recognizing societal acceptance of LGBTQ+ individuals and opposing discrimination in housing, employment and government hiring, while at the same time firmly rejecting same-sex marriage, adoption rights, pride parades and the inclusion of progressive gender theories in public education. It frames traditional family structures, defined by binary gender roles, as essential for societal stability and child-rearing, arguing that these reflect both natural order and societal consensus. The party manifesto resists expanding gender definitions and opposes their integration into school curriculums and government documents and official medical records, positioning its stance as a defence of traditional values and cultural norms. Some of the leader's comments on the "woke agenda" have been perceived by some as transphobic, misogynistic, and as employing dog-whistle rhetoric, whilst Latinopoulou has previously made remarks associating homosexuality with paedophilia amongst some gay rights activists as being a secret Trojan horse method for masking secret pedophilia legalization desires within the gay rights movement for some woke agenda advocates.

On the Gaza war, the party supports Israel and condemned the October 7th attack as an attack on Western civilisation, though Latinopoulou later emphasized that both sides should respect the rules of war, particularly considering the safety of women and children. The party also condemned the April 2024 Iranian strikes on Israel. The party condemned the court ban on the Spartans political party in contesting in the 2024 European Parliament election in Greece as a violation of free elections and democratic rights and the setting of a dangerous legal precedent.

The party supports the death penalty for heinous crimes such as murder, child rape and sex trafficking where and when evidence is overwhelming, which party leader Latinopoulou has repeatedly voiced support for in public interviews.

Latinopoulou has long accused New Democracy under Mitsotakis of being a center-left party masquerading as a center-right party and Mitsotakis as an "unrepentant socialist" and secret leftist, and that after over half a decade in government that the current state of homelessness, unsafe trains, and drug dealing and criminality in the public universities is something that after so many years in power New Democracy must support, since, according to Latinopoulou "What they tolerate they want") While refusing to vote for an EU inquiry into the Tempi case due to what she has argued would create a dangerous EU legal authority precedence in Greece, she has nonetheless called what she views as the Mitsotakis' government having done "nothing" to make the trains safer since the incident as a sign of their "heartlessness" and supports Greek legal inquiries but not EU legal inquiries into the matter. She has publicly stated as well that on the character of Kyriakos Velopoulos and as well on the case of Tempi that he is a "know-it-all geezer" who is a "fraud and a scammer" and that she is the only serious right-wing alternative to the "center left New Democracy party."

Latinopoulou, the party's leader, has also opposed the yearly celebration of the Athens Polytechnic Uprising, claiming that students are "brainwashed" about the events.

== Election results ==
=== Hellenic Parliament ===
Election	Leader	Votes	%	Seats	Rank	Status
June 2023	Afroditi Latinopoulou	22.347	0.43%	0 / 300	11th	Extra-parliamentary

=== European Parliament ===
Election	Leader	Votes	%	±pp	Seats won	+/−	Rank	EP Group
2024	Afroditi Latinopoulou	120,753	3.04%	New	1 / 21	New	8th	PfE
