= New Right (Greece) =

New Right Νέα Δεξιά (Nea Dexia)
- President: Failos Kranidiotis
- Vice President: Alkiviadis Kefalas
- Secretary General: Christos Christidis
- Founded: 13 May 2016
- Dissolved: 2023
- Split from: New Democracy
- Headquarters: 3-5 Apollonos Str., GR 105 57 Athens, Attiki
- Ideology: National conservatism
- Political position: Far-right
- European affiliation: Identity and Democracy Party (2018–2023)
- Colours: Blue Crimson
- Parliament: 0 / 300
- European Parliament: 0 / 21
- Regions: 0 / 703

Website
- neadexia.gr

The New Right (Greek: Νέα Δεξιά, Nea Dexia) was a national conservative and far-right political party in Greece. The party was formed in May 2016 by Failos Kranidiotis, a lawyer and former advisor to former prime minister Antonis Samaras, after Kranidiotis was ousted from the New Democracy party.

== History ==
Failos Kranidiotis, a lawyer and former advisor to ex-Prime Minister Antonis Samaras, founded the new party in May 2016, shortly after he was ousted from the conservative New Democracy party, by leader Kyriakos Mitsotakis over controversial online comments.

In June 2016, Kranidiotis announced the party's National Council (presidium).

In May 2022, the party announced a new coalition formed with Recreate Greece, and named National Creation.

The New Right was a member of the Movement for a Europe of Nations and Freedom from 2018 to 2023.

== Election results ==
=== Hellenic Parliament ===
Election	Hellenic Parliament					Rank	Government	Leader
Election	Votes	%	±pp	Seats won	+/−	Rank	Government	Leader
May 2023 (Note: Run as part of the National Creation coalition.)	48,087	0.81%	New	0 / 300	±0	#10	Extra-parliamentary	Failos Kranidiotis

=== European Parliament ===
European Parliament
Election	Votes	%	±pp	Seats won	+/−	Rank	Leader
2019	37,512	0.66%	New	0 / 21	▲	#19	Failos Kranidiotis
