= Failos Kranidiotis =

Greek politician, lawyer, and columnist, chairman of the political party New Right

President of the New Right (Greece)
- Vice President: Panayotis Doumas

Personal details
- Born: 16 October 1965 (age 61) Piraeus, Greece
- Profession: Politician, lawyer and columnist

Garoufail (Failos) Kranidiotis (Greek: Γαρουφαήλ (Φαήλος) Κρανιδιώτης; born 16 October 1965) is a Greek right-wing politician, lawyer and columnist, chairman of the political party New Right (Nea Dexia).

In March 2016, Kranidiotis, a close associate of former Prime Minister Antonis Samaras, was ousted from the conservative New Democracy by leader Kyriakos Mitsotakis over controversial online comments he posted in response to a diplomatic faux pas by Migration Minister Ioannis Mouzalas. Some of his previous comments have also been considered homophobic.

== Early life ==
Born in 1965 in Korydallos, a poor popular district of Piraeus. In 1999 he became known as the lawyer of Abdullah Öcalan, participating actively in the campaign of the Kurdish leader, which ended with his capture by Turkish agents in Nairobi, Kenya.

== Early political career ==
In the European Parliament elections of 1999 he was candidate MP for Political Spring. He also served as president of the nationalist organization Network 21 (Δίκτυο 21).

In the elections of 2012 he was a candidate MP for New Democracy at the Piraeus B District. Failure repeated in both 2015 National Elections, although he had doubled his votes.

In December 2015, he filed two lawsuits against Greek Education Minister Nikos Filis (SYRIZA) in connection with controversial comments regarding the 1914–23 genocide of Pontic Greeks by the Turks.

== New Right (Nea Dexia) ==
Shortly after being expelled by the newly elected New Democracy leader Kyriakos Mitsotakis, on 13 May 2016, Failos Kranidiotis founded the New Right political party, by submitting to the Supreme Court a founding declaration, signed by some 200 people.

Failos Kranidiotis and his vice president, Panayotis Doumas travelled several times to Brussels to achieve the participation of the party in the Movement for a Europe of Nations and Freedom (MENL). On 1 May 2018, Failos Kranidiotis was an official speaker at the Feast of the Nations Event in Nice France organized by the MENL and hosted by the Front national and Marine Le Pen.

== Assault ==
On 2 March 2014, a gas canister attack took place in the office of Failos Kranidiotis. The attack, which occurred in the early hours, involved the detonation of a number of small bombs at the entrance of the building in Plaka, central Athens, causing considerable damage. In a proclamation posted on the Zougla news website, the group said the gas canister attack was motivated by the fact that Kranidiotis was "a key link and main channel of communication between New Democracy and Golden Dawn," a neo-Nazi political party.

On 7 March 2017, Failos Kranidiotis reported to police that he was the victim of an attack by an unknown assailant while sitting in his car in central Athens.
