= Patriots for Europe =

Right-wing to far-right political group of the European Parliament

- European Parliament group
- English abbr.: PfE; Patriots
- Ideology: National conservatism; Right-wing populism; Euroscepticism
- Political position: Right-wing to far-right
- European parties: Patriots.eu
- From: 8 July 2024; 2 years ago
- Preceded by: Identity and Democracy
- Chaired by: Jordan Bardella
- MEP(s): 86 / 720 (12%)
- Website: www.patriotsforeurope.eu

Patriots for Europe (PfE or Patriots) is a right-wing to far-right sovereigntist political group, formed as the third-largest group ahead of the tenth European Parliament.

The group includes MEPs from all the parties of the former Identity and Democracy group (except AfD and SPD), as well as members from other groups. The group also seeks to coordinate the work of its members at the European Council and the Council of the European Union.

== History ==
=== Formation ===
Hungary's Fidesz had been unaffiliated at the European level since leaving the European People's Party Group (EPP Group) in March 2021. The Czech ANO MEPs belonged to the Alliance of Liberals and Democrats for Europe Party and its affiliated Renew Europe group since 2011, but left both organisations after the 2024 European Parliament elections, citing disagreements with the party's programme. The Freedom Party of Austria (FPÖ) belonged to the far-right Identity and Democracy (ID) group during the ninth term (2019–2024).

On 30 June 2024, the founding of the group was announced at a press conference in Vienna by Hungarian Prime Minister Viktor Orbán (Fidesz), former Czech Prime Minister Andrej Babiš (ANO 2011), and former Austrian Minister of the Interior Herbert Kickl and MEP Harald Vilimsky (both Freedom Party of Austria). Representatives of the three founding parties signed "A Patriotic Manifesto for a European Future", setting out the alliance's ideological positions, including limiting the powers and competences of the EU, a focus on European cultural identity, opposition to illegal immigration, and a revision of the European Green Deal.

On 1 July, the nationalist Portuguese party Chega, with two MEPs, became the fourth member of the Patriots for Europe. On 5 July, the Spanish Vox party also joined, leaving the European Conservatives and Reformists (ECR) group. The same day, the Dutch Party for Freedom (PVV), formerly part of the ID Group, also announced it would join. On 6 July, the Danish People's Party and Vlaams Belang, both part of the ID group, announced they would also join, bringing the group above the minimum number of member states required for an official European Parliament group. On 8 July, the National Rally (RN) and Lega were announced as new members of the group. The prerequisite for establishing a political group of the European Parliament is the membership of at least 23 MEPs from at least seven EU member states. The alliance met this criterion on 6 July 2024. According to Le Monde, the RN waited until after the second round of the 2024 French legislative election for the announcement "for fear of reviving suspicion of pro-Russian sympathies".

==== Potential members ====
During the formation process, parties previously speculated as possible members of the new EU Group included:

- Germany: Alternative for Germany (AfD), which has 15 MEPs (formerly part of the ID Group). However, due to previous tension between Fidesz and AfD, this was seen as unlikely, with AfD stating it had no current plans to join. AfD expressed interest in creating a group including Hungarian Fidesz rival Our Homeland Movement and the Bulgarian Revival. These parties eventually established a separate far-right grouping, Europe of Sovereign Nations. Fidesz leader Viktor Orbán later stated in an interview that the National Rally had objected to AfD joining the Patriots for Europe group.
- Poland: Law and Justice (PiS), which won 20 MEPs, initially negotiated with the Patriots for Europe, but later reached an agreement with Brothers of Italy allowing it to remain in the European Conservatives and Reformists (ECR).
- Slovakia: Republic Movement, with two MEPs, expressed interest in membership, but one MEP subsequently joined Europe of Sovereign Nations on 10 July.
- Slovakia: Smer–SD was speculated to join the alliance with its five MEPs; however, according to its junior coalition partner, Hlas–SD, Smer–SD expressed a preference for rejoining the S&D group. Although it was later rejected from S&D, Smer–SD declined to join Patriots for Europe, saying that it can not join the group that "has nothing to do with social democracy".
- Slovenia: The Slovenian Democratic Party (SDS), which won four MEPs, ultimately remained part of the EPP Group, while noting that not all SDS MEPs agreed with this decision. Branko Grims stated that while he preferred Patriots for Europe, two SDS MEPs preferred continued EPP membership, while one other supported ECR membership.
- Romania: The Democratic Alliance of Hungarians in Romania (RMDSZ), which won two MEPs, announced that the party will remain in the EPP group, because they believe that Hungarian interests can be asserted by being in separate factions, and because Fidesz has not approached them to join.

=== 10th European Parliament (2024–present) ===
On 8 July, Jordan Bardella, president of the French National Rally (RN), was named as the group's president.

The Polish Confederation's National Movement, which won two MEPs, announced in July 2024 that it was in negotiations with Patriots for Europe, while the three Confederation MEPs from New Hope joined the ESN group, and the one Confederation of the Polish Crown MEP was not seeking to join. Ultimately, the National Movement joined Patriots for Europe on 1 October.

Following the expulsion of Luxembourgish Alternative Democratic Reform Party (ADR) MEP Fernand Kartheiser from the ECR group, the Patriots for Europe group approached the ADR for talks. The ADR stated that while it was considering what group the party wanted to belong to if the whole party were fully expelled from the ECR Party, it was not yet actively discussing membership with any other political group.

After the expulsion of Smer-SD from the Party of European Socialists, Smer MEP Monika Beňová said the party had an offer from Patriots for Europe to join, and expressed her preference for this option. However, Smer MEP Katarína Roth Neveďalová stated it was "not true" that the party was seeking to join the Patriots group, noting that the party had so far only approved a mandate to join another group, which could be possibly be a new faction. Deputy Speaker of the Slovak Parliament Tibor Gašpar, a Smer MP, confirmed that the party was considering joining Patriots for Europe. During this time, Smer leader Robert Fico was reportedly in "ongoing consultations" with Fidesz leader Viktor Orbán about joining the group, though Fico remained undecided. Vox of Spain and Chega of Portugal signaled openness to including Smer. According to Beňová, the party ultimately decided to postpone its decision until September 2026.

On 21 October 2026, Kateřina Konečná, MEP and former leader of the Czech Communist Party, announced on social media that she had joined the Patriots for Europe group.

== MEPs ==
=== 10th European Parliament ===
Patriots for Europe has MEPs in 14 member states. Dark purple indicates member states sending multiple MEPs, light purple indicates member states sending a single MEP.

| State | National party | Former political group | European alliance | MEPs |
|---|---|---|---|---|
| Austria | Freedom Party of Austria; Freiheitliche Partei Österreichs (FPÖ) | ID | Patriots.eu | 6 / 20 |
| Belgium | Vlaams Belang (VB) | ID | Patriots.eu | 3 / 22 |
| Czech Republic | ANO 2011 (ANO) | Renew (Note: ANO announced its departure from ALDE and Renew Europe on 21 June 2024, with leader Andrej Babiš declaring that ANO would not be able to fulfill its program as part of those groups. ANO considered joining other EU political groups after its departure, before successfully negotiating the creation of the Patriots for Europe alliance with Fidesz and the FPÖ.) | Patriots.eu | 7 / 21 |
| Czech Republic | Motorists for Themselves; Motoristé sobě (AUTO) | N/A | Patriots.eu | 1 / 21 |
| Czech Republic | Independent (Note: Elected as Communist Party of Bohemia and Moravia but later left the party.); Kateřina Konečná | NI | Independent | 1 / 53 |
| Denmark | Danish People's Party; Dansk Folkeparti (DF) | ID | Patriots.eu | 1 / 15 |
| France | National Rally; Rassemblement National (RN) | ID | Patriots.eu | 29 / 81 |
| Greece | Voice of Reason; Φωνή Λογικής (ΦΛ) | N/A | Patriots.eu | 1 / 21 |
| Hungary | Fidesz – Hungarian Civic Alliance; Fidesz – Magyar Polgári Szövetség | NI | Patriots.eu | 10 / 21 |
| Hungary | Christian Democratic People's Party; Kereszténydemokrata Néppárt (KDNP) | EPP (Note: KDNP left the EPP party and the EPP group, after the EPP group decided to admit the TISZA party. After the creation of the Patriots for Europe alliance, KDNP decided to join.) | None | 1 / 21 |
| Italy | Lega | ID | Patriots.eu | 7 / 76 |
| Latvia | Latvia First; Latvija pirmajā vietā (LPV) | N/A | Patriots.eu | 1 / 9 |
| Netherlands | Party for Freedom; Partij voor de Vrijheid (PVV) | ID (Note: Their MEP left PVV and eventually the ID group.) | Patriots.eu | 6 / 31 |
| Poland | National Movement (Note: Part of the Confederation alliance. Its other members did not join.); Ruch Narodowy (RN) | NI | Patriots.eu | 2 / 53 |
| Poland | Independent (Note: Member of the Confederation alliance. Elected as New Hope but later removed from the party.); Ewa Zajączkowska-Hernik | ESN | Independent | 1 / 53 |
| Portugal | Chega | N/A (Note: The party contested the 2019 European Parliament election as a member of the ID Party, but failed to win any seats. After the 2024 election, the party gained representation and decided to join PfE.) | Patriots.eu | 2 / 21 |
| Slovenia | Slovenian Democratic Party (Note: Only Branko Grims joined. Its other members remain in the EPP Group.); Slovenska demokratska stranka (SDS) | NI | European People's Party | 1 / 9 |
| Spain | Vox | ECR (Note: Vox left the ECR Group on 5 July.) | Patriots.eu | 6 / 61 |
| European Union | Total | | | 86 / 720 |

== Organization ==
=== President ===
| President | Took office | Left office | State | Party |
|---|---|---|---|---|
| Jordan Bardella | 8 July 2024 | present | France | National Rally |

=== Bureau ===
==== 2024–present ====
Group bureau during the 10th European Parliament.

| Position | Name | State | National party | European alliance |
|---|---|---|---|---|
| President | Jordan Bardella | France | National Rally | Patriots.eu |
| First Vice-President | Kinga Gál | Hungary | Fidesz | Patriots.eu |
| Vice-President | Harald Vilimsky | Austria | Freedom Party of Austria | Patriots.eu |
| Vice-President | António Tânger Corrêa | Portugal | Chega | Patriots.eu |
| Vice-President | Sebastiaan Stöteler | Netherlands | Party for Freedom | Patriots.eu |
| Vice-President | Klára Dostálová | Czech Republic | ANO 2011 | Patriots.eu |
| Vice-President | Hermann Tertsch | Spain | Vox | Patriots.eu |
| Vice-President | Branko Grims | Slovenia | Slovenian Democratic Party | European People’s Party |
| Treasurer | Gerolf Annemans | Belgium | Vlaams Belang | Patriots.eu |
| Co-head of Czech delegation | Ondřej Knotek | Czech Republic | ANO 2011 | Patriots.eu |
| Co-head of Czech delegation | Filip Turek | Czech Republic | AUTO | Patriots.eu |
| Head of Belgian delegation | Tom Vandendriessche | Belgium | Vlaams Belang | Patriots.eu |
| Head of French delegation | Jean-Paul Garraud | France | National Rally | Patriots.eu |
| Head of Greek delegation | Afroditi Latinopoulou | Greece | Voice of Reason | Patriots.eu |
| Head of Hungarian delegation | Tamás Deutsch | Hungary | Fidesz | Patriots.eu |
| Head of Italian delegation | Paolo Borchia | Italy | League | Patriots.eu |
| Head of Latvian delegation | Vilis Krištopans | Latvia | Latvia First | Patriots.eu |
| Head of Polish delegation | Anna Bryłka | Poland | National Movement | Patriots.eu |
| Head of Spanish delegation | Jorge Buxadé | Spain | Vox | Patriots.eu |

== See also ==
- Europe of Sovereign Nations
