= Michał Wawer =

Polish politician (born 1989)

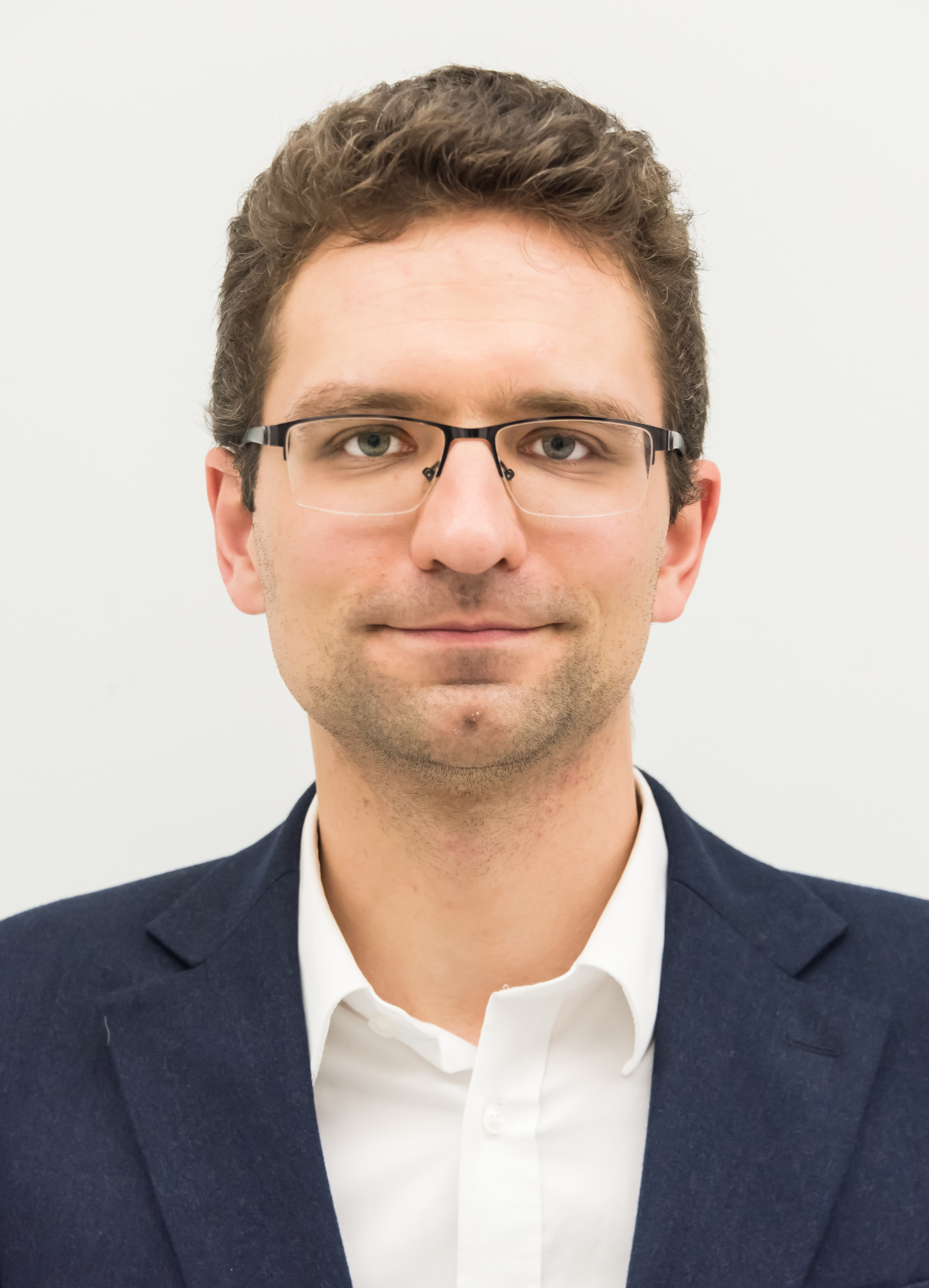
- Wawer in 2023

Member of the Sejm
- Incumbent
- Assumed office 13 November 2023
- Constituency: Kielce

Personal details
- Born: 1 April 1989 (age 37)
- Party: National Movement
- Other political affiliations: Confederation Liberty and Independence

Michał Wawer (born 1 April 1989) is a Polish politician serving as a member of the Sejm since 2023. He is the treasurer of the Confederation Liberty and Independence and a vice president of the National Movement.
