= Catherine Griset =

French politician

Catherine Griset MEP
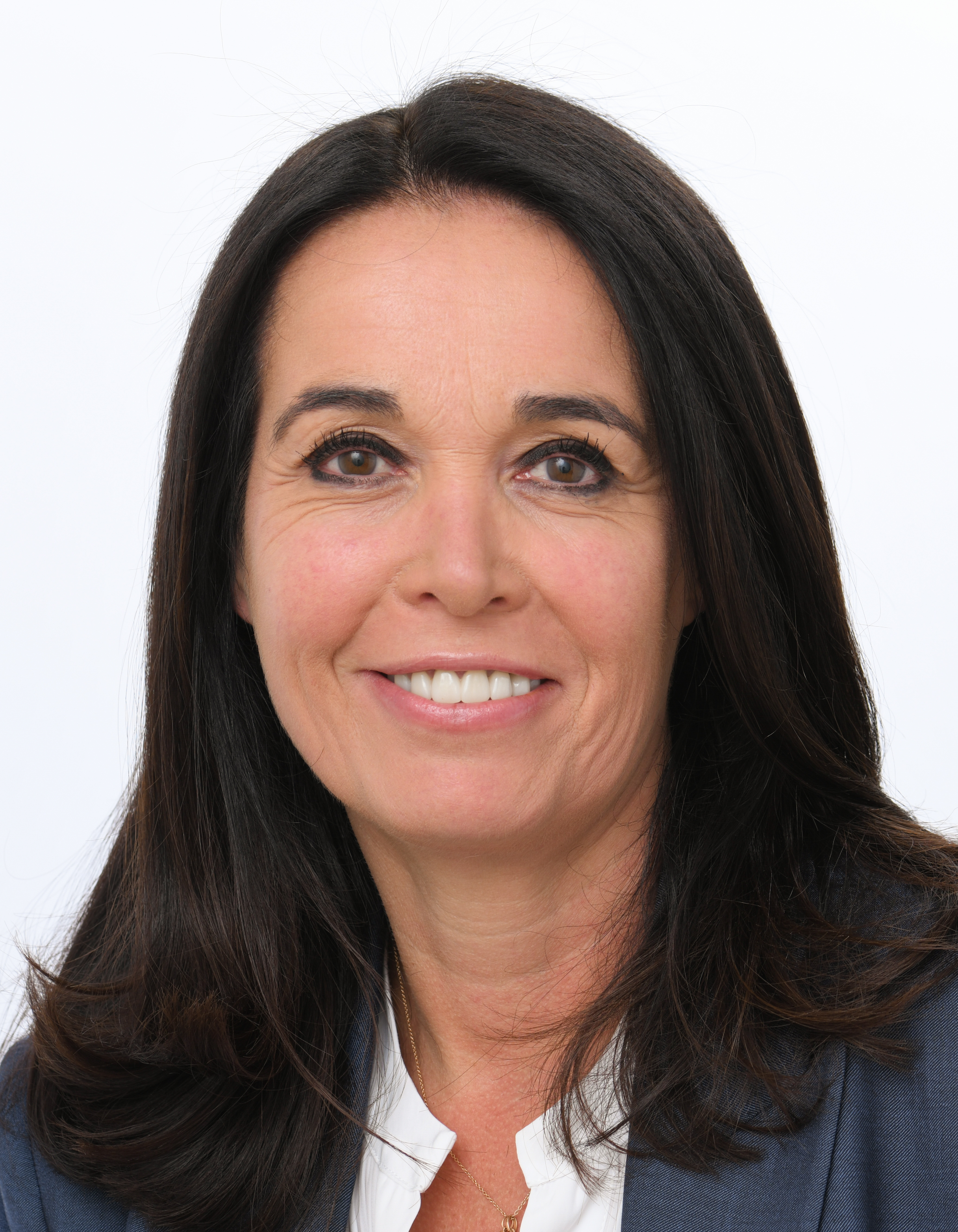

Member of the European Parliament for France
- Incumbent
- Assumed office 2 July 2019

Personal details
- Party: National Rally (France)

Catherine Griset is a French politician who was elected as a Member of the European Parliament in 2019 and re-elected in 2024.

== Biography ==
Catherine Griset was born in Boulogne-sur-Mer, France. After a brief period studying law she worked as a legal assistant to Jean-Marie Le Pen´s daughter.

Griset is divorced and has one child.
