= National Creation =

National Creation Εθνική Δημιουργία Ethniki Dimiourgia
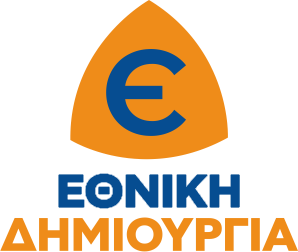
- President: Thanos Tzimeros
- Vice President: Failos Kranidiotis
- Founded: 19 May 2022
- Dissolved: 27 May 2023
- Ideology: Neoliberalism; Anti-communism; Anti-Islam; Atlanticism; Anti-immigration
- Political position: Right-wing
- Colours: Orange Blue

Website
- www.ethnikidimiourgia.gr

National Creation (Greek: Εθνική Δημιουργία) was a Greek political alliance, founded in 2022 and formed between Recreate Greece and New Right.

== History ==
Founded in May 2022, it is led by Thanos Tzimeros and is self-identified as a citizen-centered political movement, with emphasis on the rebuilding of the Greek state.

The party initially started as Dimiourgia (Creation) when Thanos Tzimeros and Failos Kranidiotis joined forces to create the party in early 2021. Then, after Constantinos Bogdanos was ousted from the New Democracy party, his political movement National Agreement merged with Dimiourgia. A few months later Bogdanos was expelled from National Creation by Tzimeros and Kranidiotis and founded the Patriotic Force for Change party.

After the party's failure to enter in the parliament in May 2023 general election, Thanos Tzimeros resigned as president of National Creation and Recreate Greece. Consequently, the coalition decided not to participate in the next election and dissolved.

== Ideology and leadership ==
The party identified as right-wing and it promotes conservative ideas as well as liberal ones with emphasis on free-market economics, as did Recreate Greece and Nea Dexia, as well as a focus on anti-migration and anti-communist sentiments. Tzimeros has described the Greek Communist Party as dangerous and stated that it must be outlawed. The party also classifies Islam as a threat. The party claimed it respects gay people, but has a conservative stance on LGBTQ+ right to marriage and adoption, even though the party's president does not reject them completely (the party's vice-president has voiced his opposition to such a change). Furthermore, the party was tough on corruption, supporting the rule of law, separation of church and state, digital governance for efficiency and transparency reasons. Lastly, the party supported atlanticism and European Federalism; however, the coalition took a soft Eurosceptic stance.

== Election results ==
=== Hellenic Parliament ===
Election	Hellenic Parliament					Rank	Government	Leader
Election	Votes	%	±pp	Seats won	+/−	Rank	Government	Leader
May 2023	48,087	0.81%	New	0 / 300	±0	#10	Extra-parliamentary	Thanos Tzimeros
