= Konstantinos Bogdanos =

Greek politician and journalist

Konstantinos Bogdanos Κωνσταντίνος Μπογδάνος MP

President of the Patriotic Force for Change
- Incumbent
- Assumed office 26 September 2022

Member of the Hellenic Parliament
- In office 7 July 2019 – 22 April 2023
- Constituency: Athens A

Personal details
- Born: December 27, 1979 (age 46) Marousi, Athens, Greece
- Other political affiliations: New Democracy (2019–21); Independent (2021–22); National Creation (2022); Patriotic Force for Change (2022-2023)
- Spouse(s): Gina Moscholiou (m. 2014; div. 2015) Eleni Karvela (m. 2019)
- Education: Panteion University (BA); King's College London (MA)
- Profession: Politician; Journalist; Writer

Konstantinos Bogdanos (Greek: Κωνσταντίνος Μπογδάνος, romanized: Konstantínos Bogdános; born 27 December 1979) is a Greek politician and journalist who served as a member of the Hellenic Parliament for the Athens A electoral district from 2019 to 2023. Elected on the New Democracy ticket, he was expelled from the party in October 2021, after he made an anti-communist rant.

From 2022 and until 2023, he led the Patriotic Force for Change, a national conservative party which he founded on 26 September 2022.

== Early life ==
Bogdanos was born in Marousi on December 27, 1979. He studied journalism and communication at Panteion University and completed postgraduate studies in philosophy at King's College London. He has undergone further training, attending seminars on economics at the London Business School (LBS).

== Media portrayal and ideology ==
Many media organizations have claimed that he belongs to the far right of the political spectrum. He identifies himself as right-wing, liberal and conservative, rejecting the "far-right" label. He is anti-communist.
