= May 2023 Greek parliamentary election =

- 21 May 2023

All 300 seats in the Hellenic Parliament 151 seats needed for a majority
- Opinion polls
- Registered: 9,946,082
- Turnout: 61.76% (▲3.98 pp)
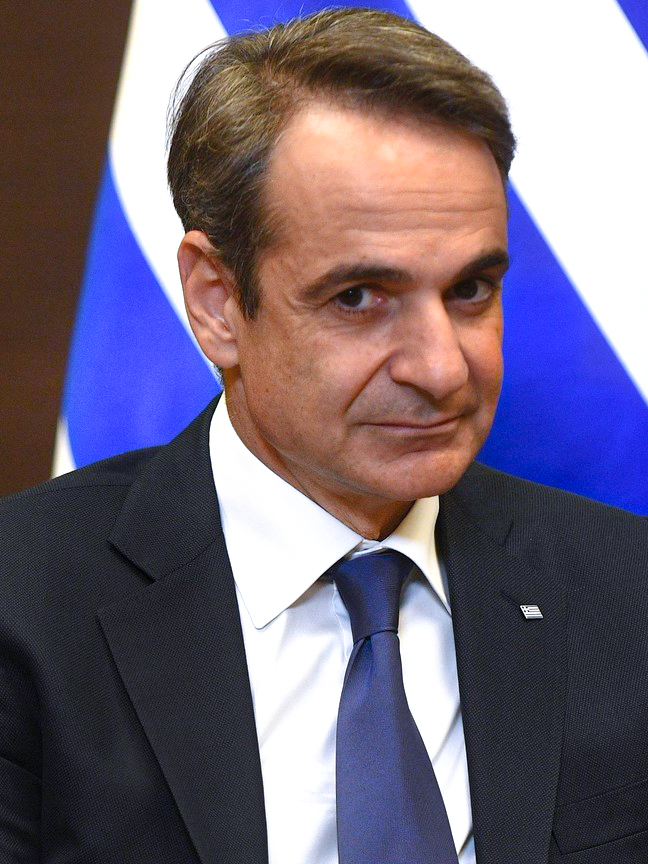

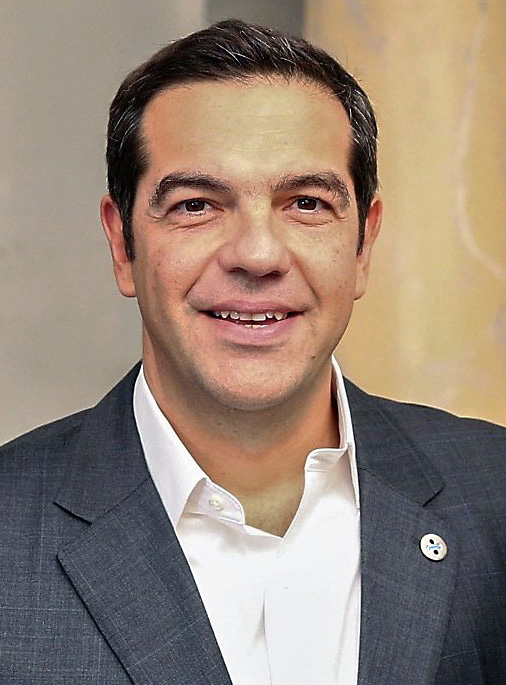

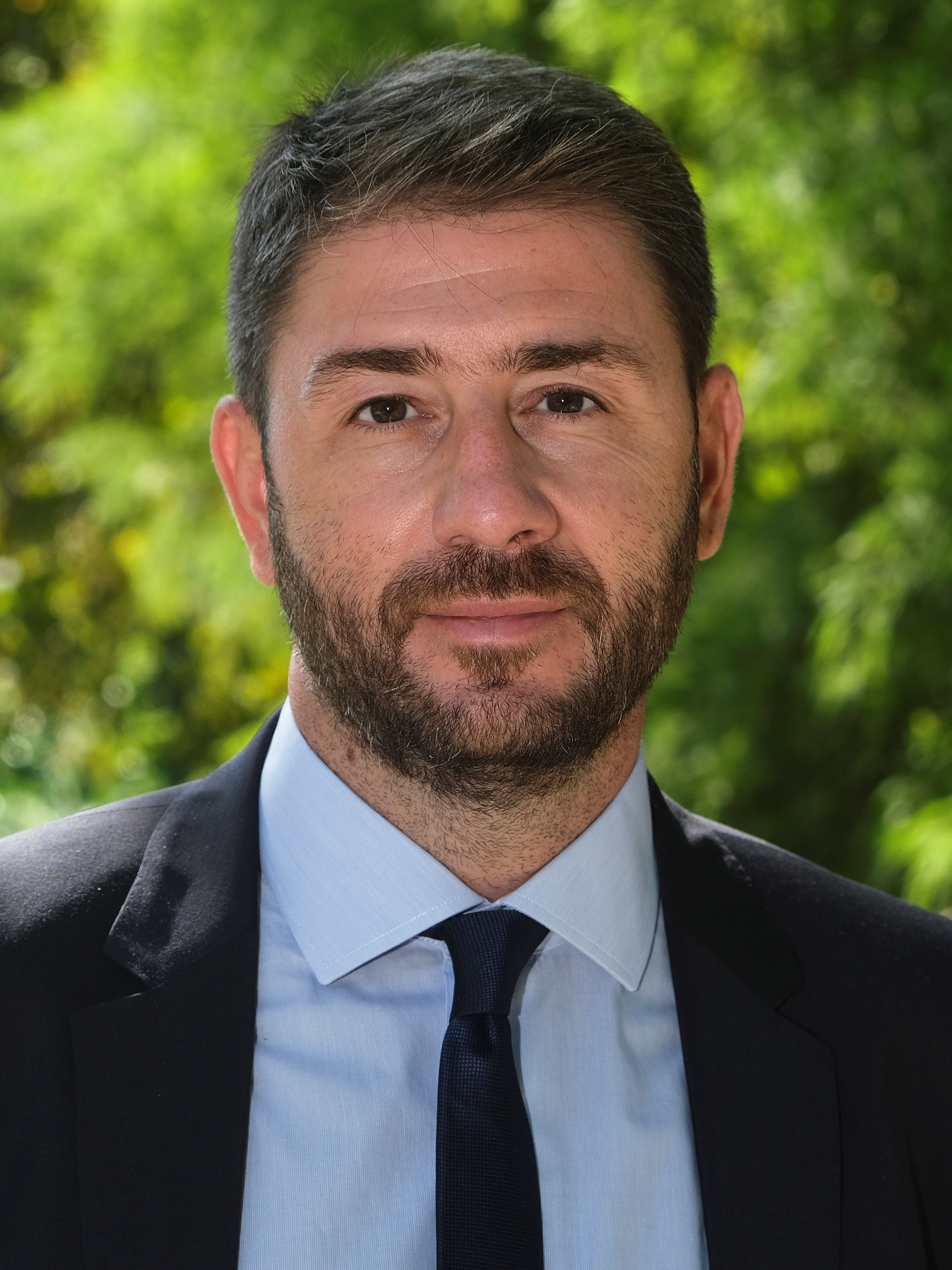

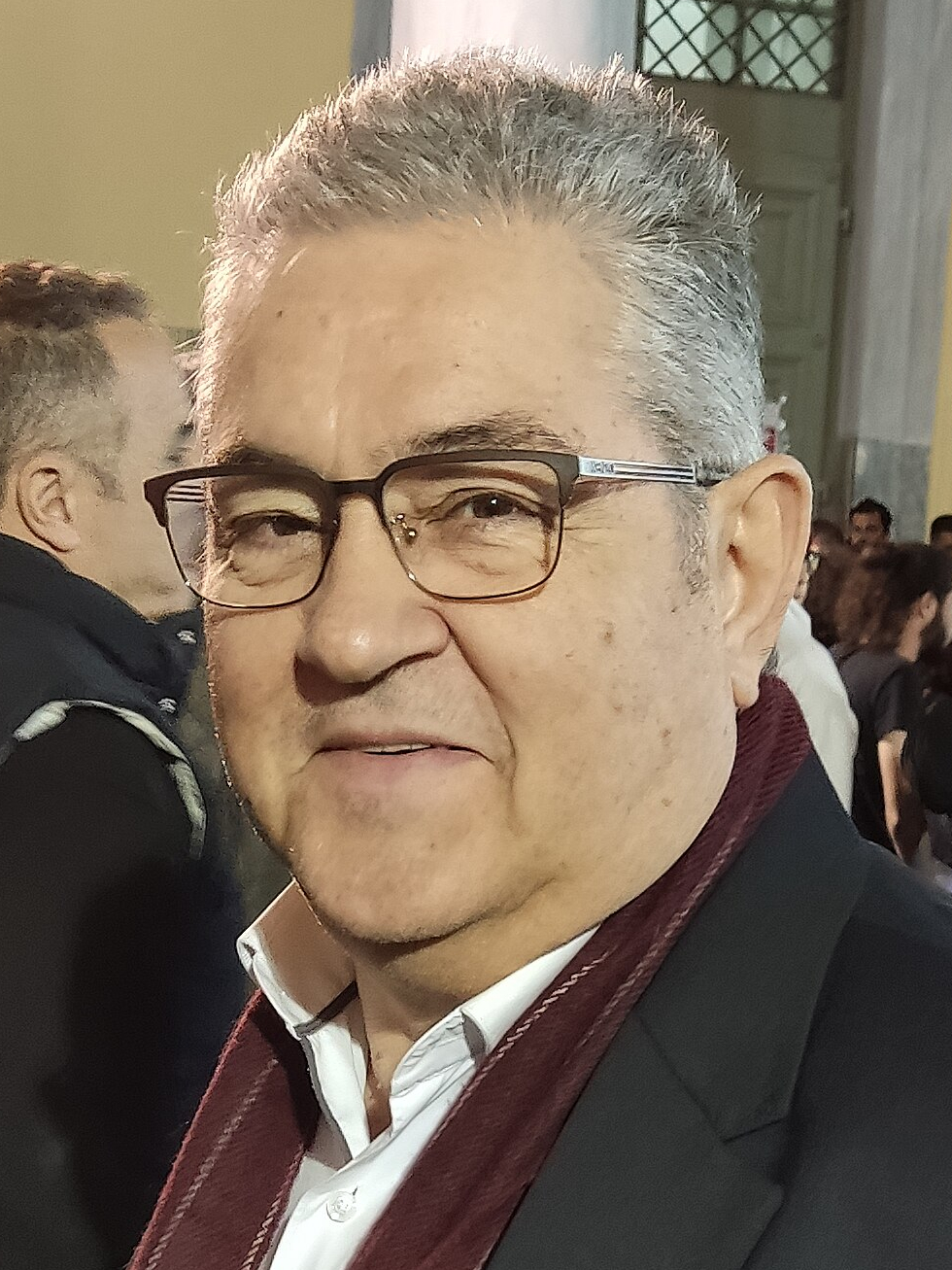

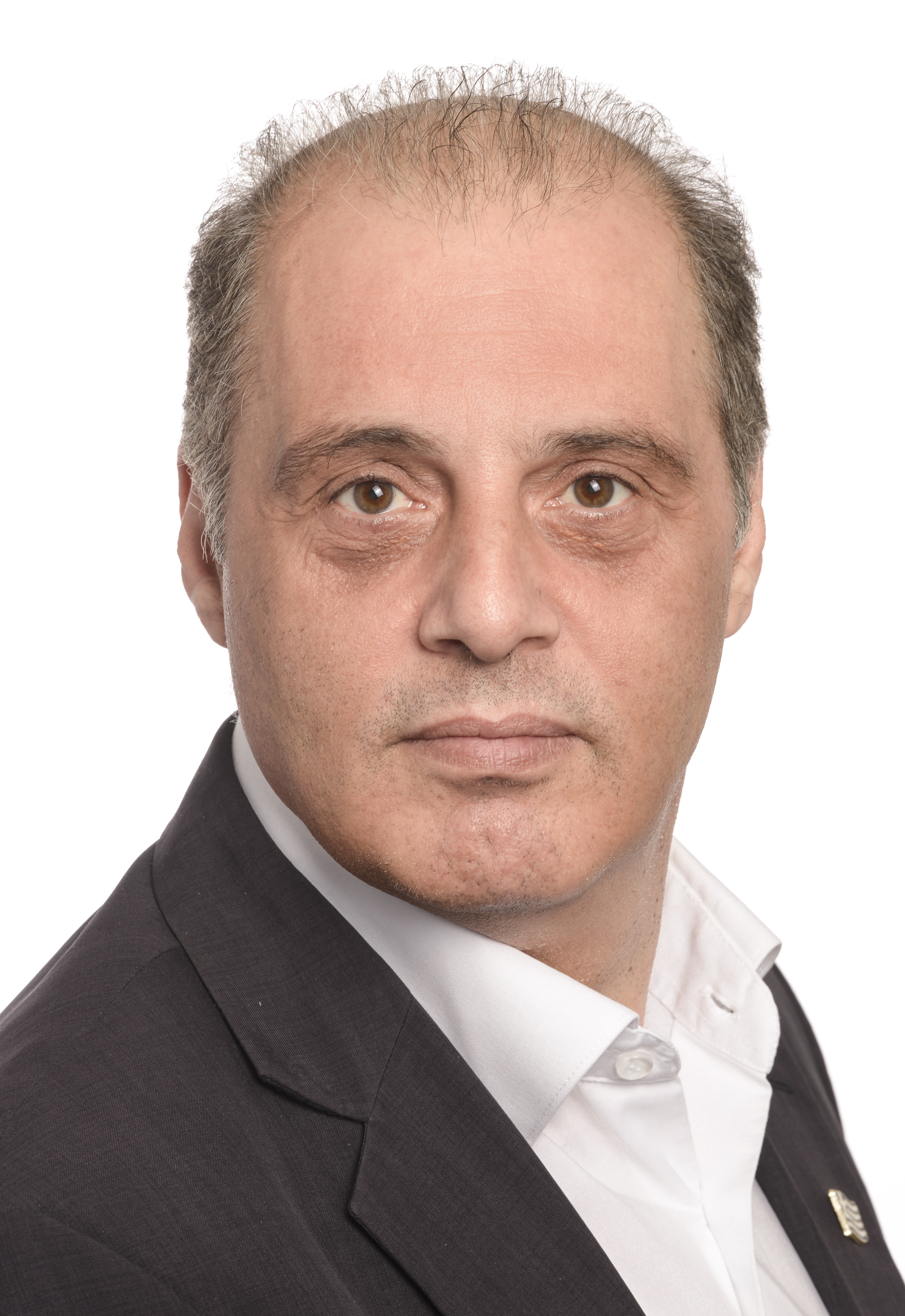
	First party	Second party	Third party
Leader	Kyriakos Mitsotakis	Alexis Tsipras	Nikos Androulakis
Party	ND	Syriza	PASOK–KINAL
Last election	39.85%, 158 seats	31.53%, 86 seats	8.10%, 22 seats
Seats won	146	71	41
Seat change	▼12	▼15	▲19
Popular vote	2,407,750	1,184,621	676,165
Percentage	40.79%	20.07%	11.46%
Swing	▲0.94 pp	▼11.46 pp	▲3.36 pp
	Fourth party	Fifth party
Leader	Dimitris Koutsoumpas	Kyriakos Velopoulos
Party	KKE	EL
Last election	5.30%, 15 seats	3.70%, 10 seats
Seats won	26	16
Seat change	▲11	▲6
Popular vote	426,628	262,498
Percentage	7.23%	4.45%
Swing	▲1.93 pp	▲0.75 pp
- Results by constituency
Prime Minister before election
Kyriakos Mitsotakis
ND
Prime Minister after election
Ioannis Sarmas
Caretaker

Snap parliamentary elections were held in Greece on 21 May 2023 to elect all 300 members of the Hellenic Parliament. They were the first elections since 1990 to be held without a seat bonus, due to amendments to the electoral law made in 2016. The elections instead used a system of proportional representation.

The New Democracy of Prime Minister Kyriakos Mitsotakis achieved victory, winning a plurality. As the election did not result in any party gaining a majority, and no coalition government was formed by any of the parties eligible to do so, Mitsotakis called for another snap election in June. On 24 May 2023, as required by Greece's constitution, President Katerina Sakellaropoulou appointed Ioannis Sarmas to be the caretaker prime minister for the interim.

== Background ==
On 8 February 2023 Parliament voted to prohibit parties led nominally or actually by convicts from running in the elections, a provision possibly applicable in the case of the National Party – Greeks party. New Democracy and PASOK voted for the law, while the Communist Party of Greece, Greek Solution and MeRA25 voted against, with Syriza voting present.

Prime Minister Kyriakos Mitsotakis visited President Katerina Sakellaropoulou on 22 April 2023 in order to request the dissolution of the Parliament due to a national issue of extraordinary importance (pursuant to Article 41 of the Constitution of Greece); the issue cited was the need of political stability for the achievement of investment-grade. The election day was set for Sunday 21 May, a day before the end of the 30-day period within which elections must be held following the dissolution of the Parliament.

A large number of parties, mostly of the far right, were stopped from running in the elections either because of legal or bureaucratic reasons.

== Electoral system ==
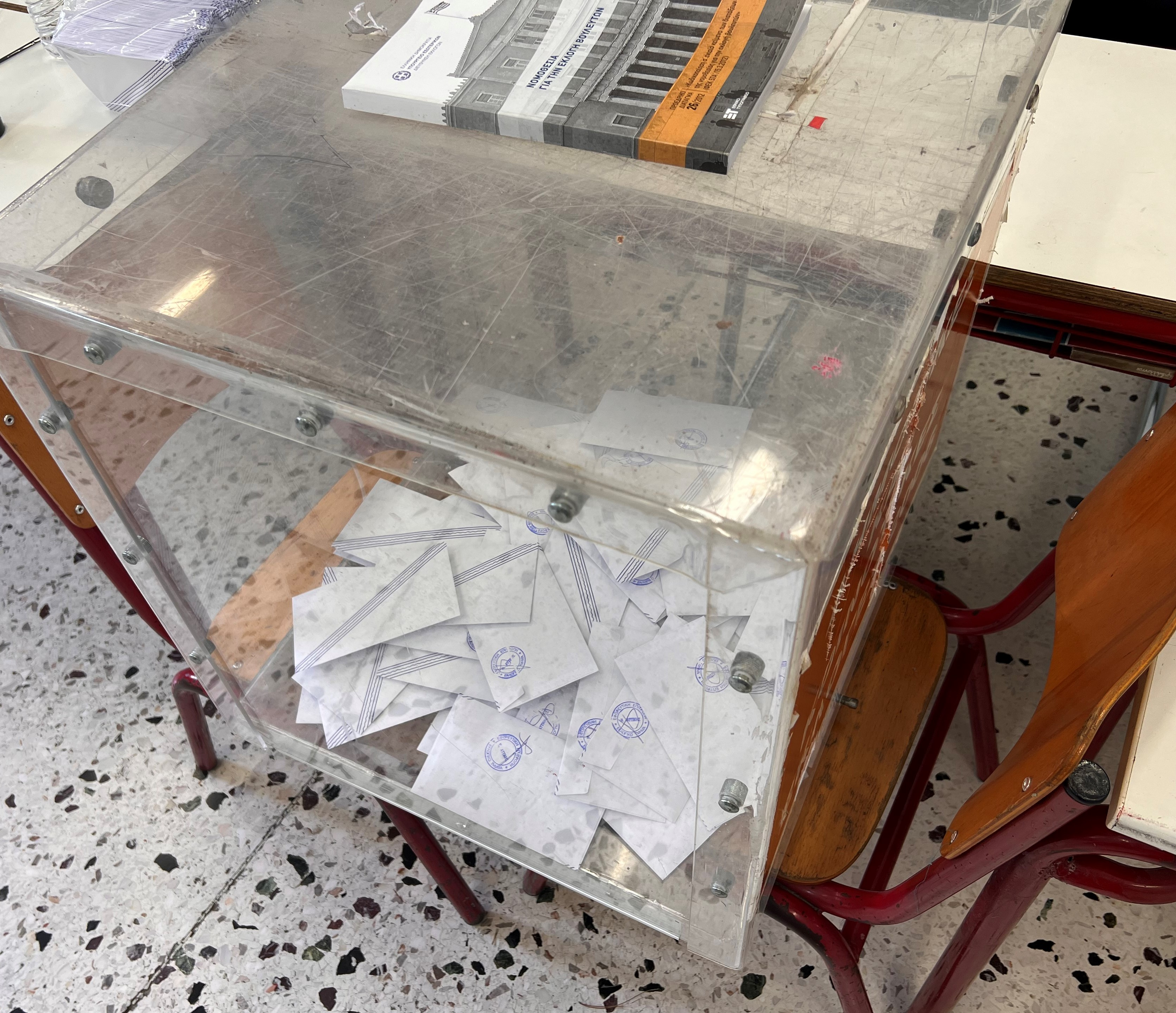
Ballot box in a Greek election centre

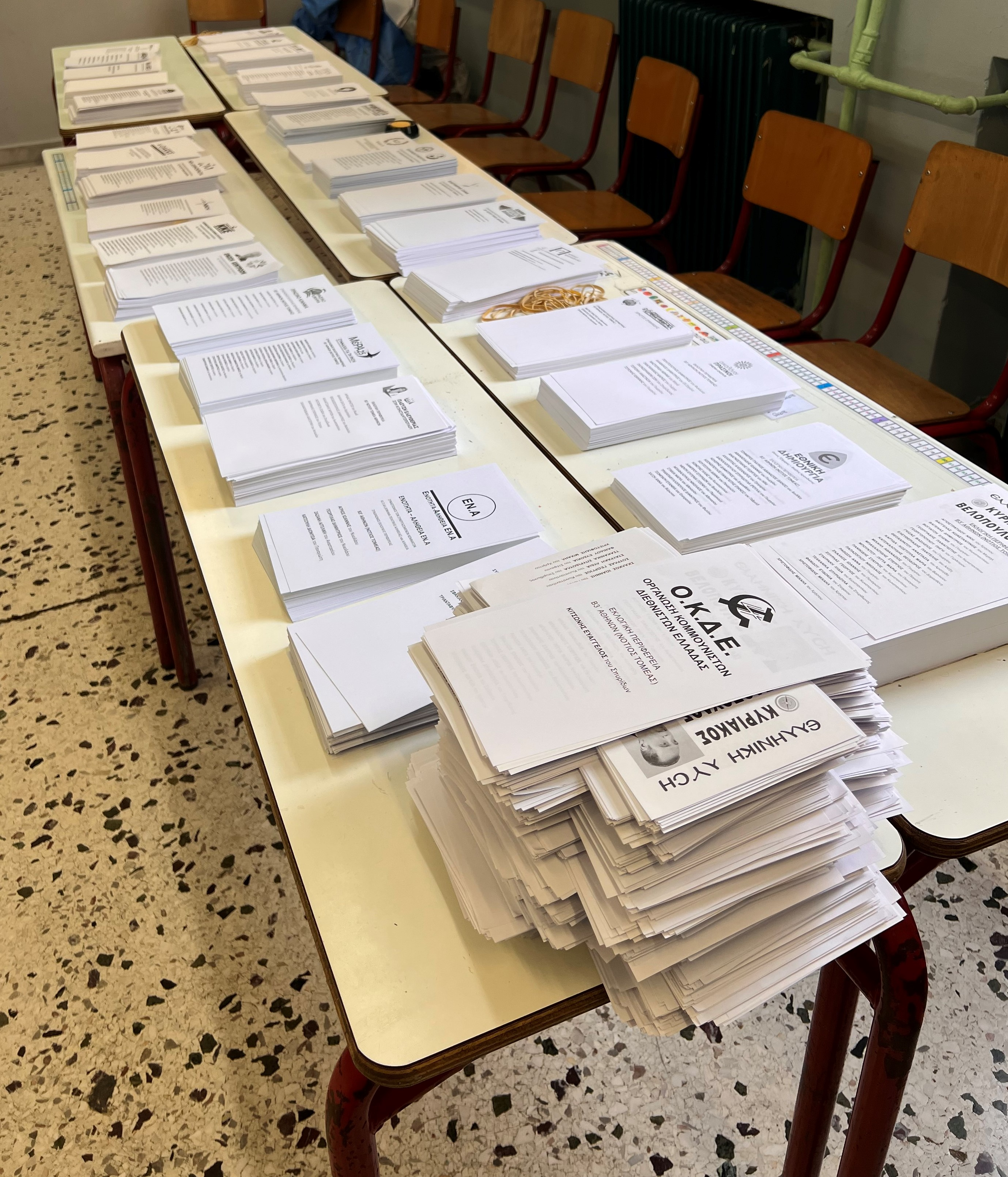
Ballots in a Greek election centre

The electoral law under which the 2023 elections were held was passed in 2016 by the SYRIZA-ANEL coalition government. Under the Constitution, amendments to the electoral law come into effect starting from the second election to be held following their passage, unless they pass with a supermajority.

SYRIZA-ANEL's 2016 law established a purely proportional system with a 3% electoral threshold. It ditched the 50-seat majority bonus, which had been in place since 1990.

In January 2020, soon after returning to power, New Democracy, which has always been a proponent of majority bonuses since 1974, passed a new electoral law to reinstate the bonus, albeit under a different formula. The party list with the most votes would receive up to 50 extra seats, benefitting disproportionally under a new sliding scale: It gets at least 20 extra seats (assuming it receives at least 25% of the vote) plus another extra seat for every half percentage point between 25% and 40%, for a total of 50 extra seats when reaching at least 40% of the vote. Only the remaining seats (at least 250) are proportionally distributed among all parties above 3% (including the largest party itself). This 2020 law would take effect starting from the next Greek election after the May 2023 election (which turned about to be just a month later in June 2023, as election winners New Democracy wanted the extra seats to gain an absolute majority of seats).

A 2019 law granted the right to vote for Greeks abroad which have lived for two years in Greece during the previous 35 years and who have submitted a tax return during the year of the election or the previous year. Voters from abroad choose the national-wide ballot of their desired party without choosing candidates, and their vote is counted equally in final results. In this election only 22,857 people from the Greek diaspora were registered as voters, much fewer than expected, because of the legal restrictions in place.

Voting was theoretically compulsory, with voter registration being automatic, but, just as it happened in previous years, none of the penalties and sanctions in place for those who did not vote were enforced.

== Campaign ==
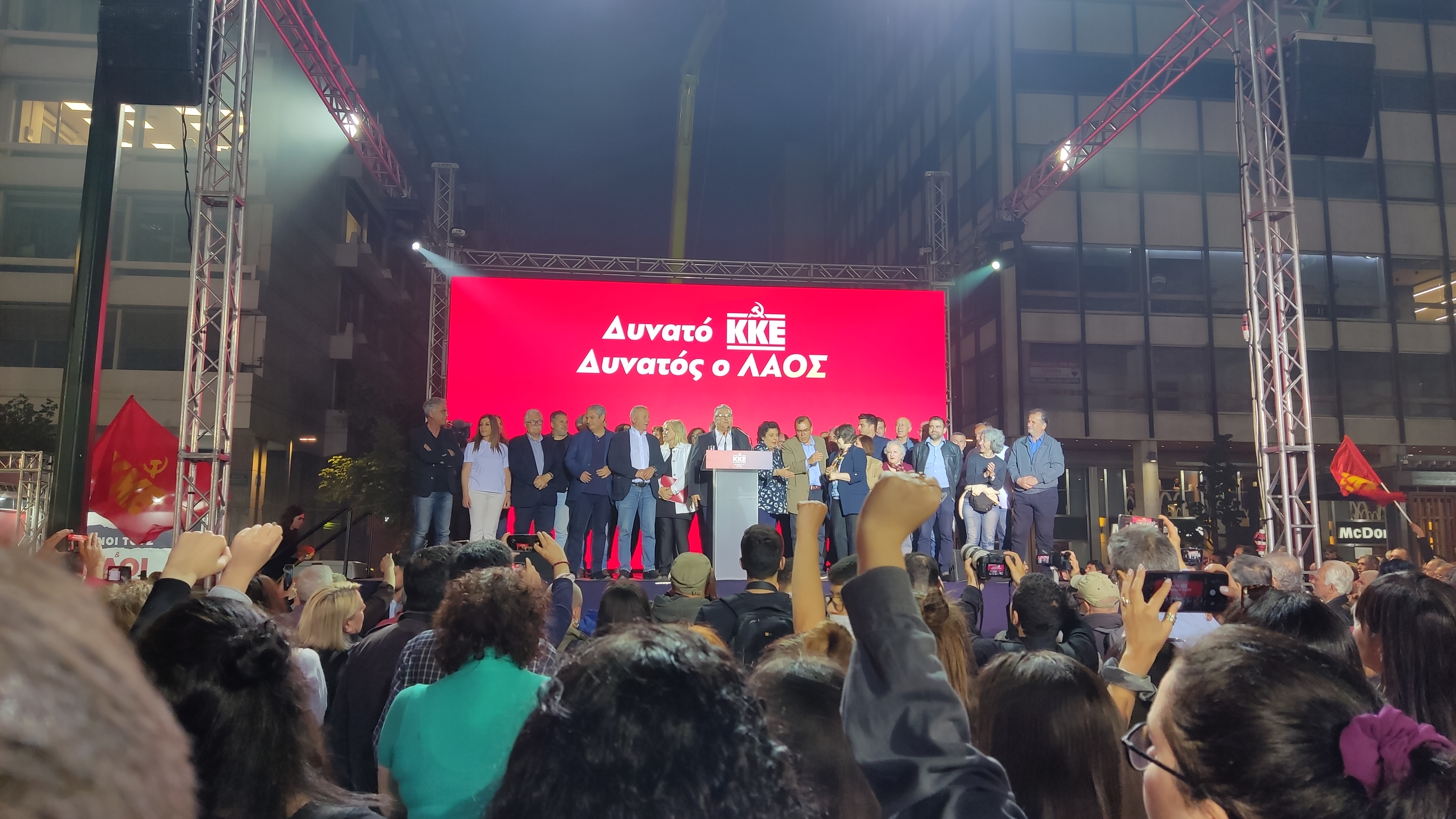
The general secretary of the Communist Party of Greece Dimitris Koutsoumpas in the general election gathering of the Communist Party in Syntagma square, Athens

Officially, the election period began on 22 April, although the parties had begun to intensify their campaigning in the days after the first announcement of the date of election. The Greek politicians have employed various methods to outreach their positions, such as town hall meetings, speeches in cafes and squares, methods which are employed both by Kyriakos Mitsotakis and Alexis Tsipras.

New Democracy campaigned on reform and opening of Greece worldwide, while associating Syriza, the rival party, with populism. New Democracy's campaign focuses on tax cuts, investment promises and lower unemployment promises, as well generically on the economy, bringing up their overall management of the Greek economy, with Greece being named the Top Economic Performer for 2022 by The Economist. This was in particular due to Greece in 2022 being able to repay ahead of schedule 2.7 billion euros ($2.87 billion) of loans owed to Eurozone countries under the first bailout it received during its decade-long debt crisis, along with being on the verge of reaching investment-grade rating.

Syriza's campaign focused on the 2022 wiretapping scandal, blaming New Democracy for the inadequate safety measures that resulted on the Tempi rail crash, as well as the housing crisis, the problems of the middle class, the lack of trust of the citizens in Mitsotakis, and other issues.

PASOK, once one of the two main parties, had a campaign focusing on meritocracy, green transition, a strong healthcare system and transparency. Its leader, Nikos Androulakis, decried both Mitsotakis and Tsipras because they supported austerity measures. He insisted that a coalition government, in order to participate in it, must have a nonpartisan leader voted on consensus.

The Communist Party of Greece campaigned on workers' issues, such as the exploitation of workers from employers and bad working conditions in many companies, the Tempi rail crash and the infrastructure from earlier governments, stopping Greek support to Ukraine, and the housing crisis and living standards. It also emphasized in their campaign that "each vote that goes to the Communist Party, remains there and strengthens the struggle". It opposed the border disputes with Turkey and any other country, which, according to the Communist Party, were encouraged by NATO, the United States, and the European Union. It supported the people-friendly energy planning, and claimed that under the 2023 circumstances, energy was a way of profit for the capital. It supported public education, the legalisation of illegal migrants living and working in the country, as well a free health system. It claimed that the justice system is subordinated in the logic that prioritises profit over human life.

Greek Solution supported economic patriotism, structural changes in the economy in order to reduce the dependency on tourism, the expansion of the territorial waters to 12 miles from the coast, green transition and the exploitation of the country's natural resources.

MeRA25 supported a "break off from the Brussels directives and the interests of the oligarchy", the introduction of a free savings system (Dimitra), the abolition of mandatory conscription, and a change in the status of NATO membership for Greece. It supported the abolition of the energy exchange, and opposed the division of the world in geopolitical blocks. It also opposed the exploitation of the natural resources of Greece. It supported an educational reform, an independent judicial system, public health and public education.

=== Main party slogans ===
Party or alliance	Original slogan	English translation
ND	«ΣΤΑΘΕΡΑ ΤΟΛΜΗΡΑ ΜΠΡΟΣΤΑ»	"FIRMLY BRAVELY FORWARD"
SYRIZA	«Δικαιοσύνη Παντού»	"Justice Everywhere"
PASOK-KINAL	«Η κοινωνία στο προσκήνιο!»	"Society at the forefront!"
KKE	«ΜΟΝΟΙ ΤΟΥΣ ΚΑΙ ΟΛΟΙ ΜΑΣ»	"THEM ALONE AND ALL OF US"
EL	«Πρώτα η Ελλάδα, Πρώτα οι Έλληνες»	"Greece First, Greeks First"
MERA25	«Όλα μπορούν να είναι αλλιώς!»	"Everything can be different!"
PE	«Δώσε Ζωή στην Βουλή»	"Give life to the parliament"
NIKH	«Διεκδικούμε την Ελλάδα που μας αξίζει»	"We claim the Greece we deserve"

New Democracy also used the motto Greek: Η Ελλάδα δε γυρίζει πίσω, lit. 'Greece is not going back', a prominent motto of the party under Konstantinos Mitsotakis' leadership during the 1993 parliamentary elections. Additionally, ΚΚΕ supplemented its main slogan with: Greek: #ΤΩΡΑ_ΚΚΕ, lit. '#NOW_ΚΚΕ', while PASOK-KINAL also used a secondary motto in speeches and TV spots: Greek: Απόφαση Αλλαγής, lit. 'Decision for Change' Also, Greek Solution occasionally used: Greek: Παίρνουμε την Ελλάδα στα χέρια μας!, lit. 'We take Greece onto our own hands!'

=== Candidates' debates ===
On 29 April, a cross-party meeting chaired by interim Interior Minister Calliope Spanou reached an agreement to hold a six party leaders' debate on 10 May. The debate took place at 10 May 2023, 11 days before the elections. In the debate, the leaders of all 6 political parties of the Greek Parliament participated, along with 6 journalists representing all major Greek TV networks. There were 6 rounds for 6 themes. The first (1st) theme concerned: Economy, Growth and Development, the second (2nd): Foreign policy and Defense, the third (3rd): State, Institutions and Transparency, the fourth (4th) Health, education and social welfare, the fifth (5th) Energy and the Environment, and the sixth (6th): New Generation (i.e., the youth). Each journalist had 30 seconds to make a question to a candidate and 15 seconds for a follow-up question. The candidates had 90 seconds to answer the first question and 45 seconds for the follow-up. The journalists asking the questions were Sia Kosioni, Antonis Sroiter, Mara Zacharea, Rania Tzima, Panagiotis Stathis and Georgios Papadakis.

2023 Greek parliamentary election debate
Date	Time	Organisers	Moderator(s)	P Present A Absent invitee N Non-invitee						
Date	Time	Organisers	Moderator(s)	ND Mitsotakis	Syriza Tsipras	PASOK-KINAL Androulakis	KKE Koutsoumpas	EL Velopoulos	MeRA25 Varoufakis	Refs
10 May 2023	9:00PM	ERT1 (Note: Was also broadcast on all 6 nationwide TV channels, Alpha TV, ANT1, Mega Channel, Open TV,Skai TV, Star Channel)	Giorgos Kouvaras	P	P	P	P	P	P	

== Opinion polls ==
Local regression trend line of poll results from 7 July 2019 to July 2023, with each line corresponding to a political party.

== Contesting parties, alliances and independents ==
On 2 May 2023, the Supreme Court ruled that 27 political parties, 8 alliances and one independent had met the criteria to contest the election. The names of the 36 entities are listed below in alphabetical order.

1. United Popular Front
2. Front of the Greek Anticapitalist Left (ANTARSYA)
3. Assembly of Greeks
4. Breath of Democracy
5. Communist Party of Greece
6. Communist Party of Greece (Marxist–Leninist)
7. Course of Freedom
8. Dimosthenis Vergis - Greek Ecologists
9. EAN
10. Ecologist Greens - Green Unity
11. European Realistic Disobedience Front - Alliance for the Rupture (MeRA25)
12. Free Again
13. Greek Solution
14. Greek Vision
15. Green Movement
16. Marxist–Leninist Communist Party of Greece
17. Movement 21
18. Movement of the Poor
19. National Creation
20. New Democracy
21. New Structure
22. Northern League – Krama
23. Now All Together
24. Organisation of Internationalist Communists of Greece
25. Organization for the Reconstruction of the Communist Party of Greece
26. PASOK – Movement for Change
27. Political Initiative
28. Smoking Groups for Art and Artistic Creation
29. Social
30. Society of Values – Liberal Alliance
31. Stefanos Proitsis (Independent)
32. Coalition of Radical Left – Progressive Alliance (SYRIZA)
33. Union of Centrists
34. Unite Freedom Alliance
35. Unity – Truth
36. Victory

== Results ==
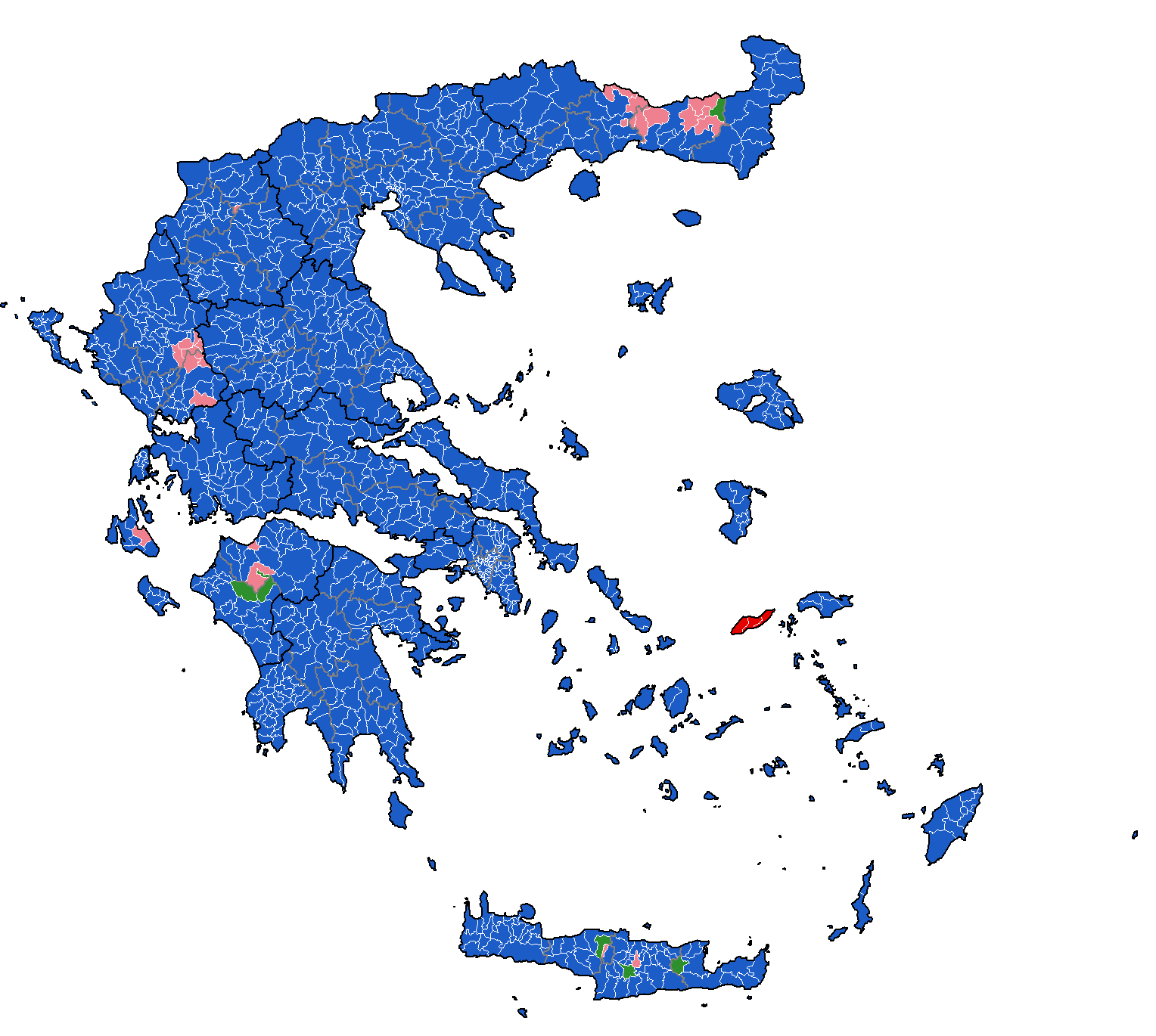
Results, showing the winning party in each municipal unit. New Democracy won a total of 990 units (97%), the largest number recorded since the Kapodistrias reform of 1998. ND (990) SYRIZA (24) PASOK (7) KKE (3)

Party	Votes	%	Seats	±
New Democracy	2,407,750	40.79	146	–12
Syriza	1,184,621	20.07	71	–15
PASOK – Movement for Change	676,165	11.46	41	+19
Communist Party of Greece	426,628	7.23	26	+11
Greek Solution	262,498	4.45	16	+6
Victory	172,260	2.92	0	New
Course of Freedom	170,424	2.89	0	0
MeRA25	155,107	2.63	0	–9
Alliance of Subversion (Note: Coalition of United Popular Front, Party of Justice, Party of Greek Hunters, Agricultural Livestock Party of Greece, Party of Greek Borrowers, Citizen Shield - Direct Democracy, Democratic Social Movement, Forward)	53,346	0.90	0	New
National Creation	48,036	0.81	0	New
Unite – Freedom Alliance	37,305	0.63	0	New
Ecologist Greens – Green Unity	35,201	0.60	0	New
Movement 21	34,914	0.59	0	New
Antarsya	31,759	0.54	0	0
Breath of Democracy	27,619	0.47	0	New
Union of Centrists	22,471	0.38	0	0
Free Again	20,443	0.35	0	New
Movement of the Poor of Greece	18,479	0.31	0	New
EAN...	15,174	0.26	0	New
Green Movement	14,627	0.25	0	New
Now All Together	14,036	0.24	0	New
Communist Party of Greece (Marxist–Leninist)	12,747	0.22	0	0
Assembly of Greeks	12,743	0.22	0	0
Smoking Groups for Art and Visual Composition	11,521	0.20	0	New
Unity – Truth	11,401	0.19	0	New
Political Initiative (Note: Coalition of Democratic Revival and Christian Democracy (Greece))	6,079	0.10	0	New
Society of Values–Liberal Alliance	5,866	0.10	0	New
Northern League – Krama	5,430	0.09	0	New
Marxist–Leninist Communist Party of Greece	3,922	0.07	0	0
Organisation of Internationalist Communists of Greece	1,930	0.03	0	0
SOCIAL – Modern Democratic Party	1,014	0.02	0	New
Organization for the Reconstruction of the KKE	1,010	0.02	0	0
New Structure	70	0.00	0	New
Greek Vision	12	0.00	0	New
Greek Ecologists	0	0.00	0	0
Independents	155	0.00	0	0
Total	5,902,763	100.00	300	0
Valid votes	5,902,763	97.39		
Invalid votes	123,318	2.03		
Blank votes	34,959	0.58		
Total votes	6,061,040	100.00		
Registered voters/turnout	9,813,595	61.76		
Source: Ministry of Interior

Vote share (in %)
ND	40.79%
Syriza	20.07%
PASOK-KINAL	11.46%
KKE	7.23%
EL	4.45%
NIKI	2.92%
PE	2.89%
MeRA25	2.63%
EPAM	0.90%
ED	0.81%
ESE	0.63%
OP	0.60%
K21	0.59%
ANT.AR.SY.A	0.54%
Others	3.49%

Parliamentary seats
ND	48.67%
Syriza	23.67%
PASOK-KINAL	13.67%
KKE	8.67%
EL	5.33%

=== Results by region ===
Constituency	ND		SYRIZA		PASOK		KKE		EL		Victory		PE		MERA25	
Constituency	%	±	%	±	%	± (Note: Compared to KINAL)	%	±	%	±	%	±	%	±	%	±
Achaea	33.95	▲1.52	27.01	▼13.26	12.42	▲3.51	6.80	▲1.35	3.68	▲0.44	3.72	New	2.93	▲1.33	2.50	▼0.64
Aetolia-Akarnania	39.48	▼1.47	25.84	▼8.09	13.53	▲3.29	6.28	▲1.35	2.51	▲0.82	3.03	New	1.73	▲0.84	1.69	▼0.44
Argolis	43.53	▲0.10	17.75	▼7.24	15.59	▲0.75	5.12	▲1.56	3.63	▲0.38	2.85	New	2.28	▲1.13	2.93	▼0.19
Arkadia	40.73	▼1.83	19.14	▼11.00	17.84	▲7.03	6.44	▲1.90	3.21	▲0.46	2.02	New	2.20	▲1.13	1.97	▼0.70
Arta	36.69	▼2.30	31.75	▼8.19	10.96	▲2.52	7.50	▲2.67	2.41	▲0.98	1.91	New	1.50	▲0.84	2.42	▲0.44
Athens A	42.18	▼0.14	22.55	▼8.74	6.70	▲1.54	8.60	▲2.23	3.02	▲0.44	1.96	New	3.35	▲1.84	3.60	▼0.24
Athens B1	46.02	▲0.21	18.76	▼9.46	7.42	▲1.83	8.63	▲2.44	2.69	▲0.15	2.07	New	3.18	▲1.79	3.50	▼0.65
Athens B2	34.46	▲4.77	22.73	▼15.87	8.80	▲2.80	11.40	▲2.75	4.09	▲0.58	2.24	New	4.01	▲2.28	3.32	▼0.96
Athens B3	41.56	▲2.07	20.54	▼11.49	7.54	▲1.82	9.68	▲2.55	3.36	▲0.37	2.06	New	3.44	▲1.93	3.41	▼1.03
East Attica	45.51	▲2.38	17.62	▼11.98	8.15	▲3.12	6.86	▲1.90	4.89	▲0.04	2.34	New	3.32	▲1.71	2.74	▼1.13
West Attica	41.90	▲7.62	18.20	▼18.04	7.43	▲2.19	9.13	▲3.20	6.69	▲1.45	2.56	New	3.09	▲1.51	2.19	▼1.01
Boeotia	37.26	▲1.01	20.85	▼11.42	13.97	▲4.27	8.90	▲1.89	4.00	▲0.61	2.63	New	2.82	▲1.38	2.27	▼1.14
Cephalonia	36.67	▼1.27	26.08	▼6.37	9.74	▲3.92	10.95	▲1.43	2.92	▲0.43	1.06	New	3.53	▲1.75	2.73	▼0.72
Chalkidiki	39.92	▼2.67	15.27	▼9.05	14.05	▲3.68	4.59	▲1.45	6.79	▲2.46	5.39	New	2.94	▲1.03	2.71	▼1.10
Chania	41.15	▲7.10	20.64	▼16.71	10.92	▲4.38	7.19	▲2.17	3.47	▲0.34	1.94	New	3.00	▲0.58	3.28	▼1.57
Chios	46.14	▲0.49	12.36	▼9.78	19.30	▲4.36	6.78	▲2.00	3.01	▲0.58	1.72	New	2.24	▲0.88	2.23	▼0.66
Corfu	37.08	▲1.94	19.99	▼14.42	12.32	▲4.82	8.66	▲1.67	3.37	▲0.97	1.76	New	5.09	▲2.96	3.15	▼1.69
Corinthia	41.60	▼0.20	19.85	▼10.88	14.14	▲5.67	4.14	▲1.34	3.97	▼0.14	3.58	New	2.75	▲1.22	2.46	▼1.22
Cyclades	47.55	▲4.00	15.95	▼12.37	11.28	▲2.76	5.63	▲1.43	3.64	▲0.76	2.24	New	2.87	▲1.02	2.88	▼1.22
Dodecanese	49.93	▲8.65	14.89	▼14.84	13.42	▲3.05	4.00	▲0.80	4.62	▲0.75	2.22	New	2.80	▲1.10	1.83	▼1.18
Drama	39.41	▼4.49	13.89	▼8.83	16.93	▲4.62	3.93	▲1.15	6.90	▲0.20	5.33	New	2.92	▲1.35	2.11	▼0.99
Elis	37.69	▲1.66	23.91	▼10.91	19.29	▲4.50	5.00	▲1.38	3.36	▲0.48	1.52	New	2.12	▲0.84	1.38	▼0.83
Euboea	37.16	▲0.55	18.85	▼16.06	15.23	▲6.70	7.14	▲2.16	5.22	▲1.06	2.26	New	3.42	▲1.46	2.48	▼0.66
Evros	43.31	▼1.68	18.67	▼8.88	12.34	▲4.17	3.88	▲0.93	8.72	▲2.86	2.82	New	1.64	▲0.83	1.61	▼0.78
Evrytania	45.17	▼3.70	22.82	▼6.72	11.24	▲1.30	5.48	▲2.69	2.91	▲0.77	3.21	New	1.55	▲0.70	1.79	▼0.05
Florina	38.12	▼0.90	24.74	▼10.77	13.12	▲6.88	4.89	▲1.82	4.71	▼2.56	4.02	New	2.05	▲0.95	2.34	▼0.44
Grevena	44.31	▲1.15	21.85	▼7.64	12.97	▲3.08	6.88	▲1.06	2.91	▲0.17	2.50	New	1.66	▲0.82	1.52	▼0.80
Imathia	40.87	▼1.05	17.65	▼9.33	11.33	▲3.09	5.81	▲1.13	7.81	▲2.18	4.57	New	2.83	▲1.12	1.94	▼1.12
Ioannina	37.93	▲0.51	24.36	▼11.94	14.51	▲4.98	7.15	▲2.16	2.95	▲0.61	2.48	New	1.74	▲0.72	2.15	▼0.64
Heraklion	35.47	▲5.32	22.93	▼20.29	21.81	▲10.43	5.12	▲1.55	2.25	▲0.07	1.34	New	1.76	▲0.76	2.90	▼1.13
Karditsa	46.38	▲1.47	19.81	▼10.64	13.70	▲4.28	7.27	▲1.67	2.71	▲0.22	1.88	New	1.53	▲0.78	1.50	▼0.37
Kastoria	46.84	▼3.39	21.00	▼6.10	8.61	▲1.61	3.81	▲1.28	5.06	▲2.33	3.91	New	2.17	▲1.16	2.51	▼0.47
Kavala	43.65	▲1.10	16.16	▼10.04	11.13	▲2.65	5.31	▲1.13	5.37	▼0.49	4.37	New	2.58	▲0.99	2.43	▼0.70
Kilkis	40.61	▼1.74	13.65	▼9.57	17.34	▲6.13	6.44	▲1.39	6.93	▲1.77	5.25	New	2.46	▲1.06	1.82	▼0.88
Kozani	38.63	▼0.76	20.74	▼10.65	13.21	▲2.91	6.13	▲1.49	4.48	▲0.47	4.89	New	2.25	▲0.86	2.26	▼0.70
Laconia	49.78	▼0.13	13.82	▼5.81	15.21	▲0.82	5.17	▲1.60	3.89	▲0.70	1.69	New	2.60	▲1.60	1.66	▼0.35
Larissa	40.23	▲0.93	19.83	▼11.42	11.91	▲3.12	8.60	▲2.35	4.02	▼0.32	3.31	New	2.13	▲0.94	2.50	▼0.31
Lasithi	39.98	▲5.56	17.76	▼16.81	21.48	▲6.08	4.68	▲1.75	2.36	▼0.28	1.61	New	2.23	▲0.91	2.70	▼0.38
Lefkada	42.43	▼1.94	19.92	▼8.27	12.00	▲2.40	11.40	▲3.24	1.64	▲0.34	1.46	New	2.13	▲1.09	2.53	▼0.28
Lesbos	40.51	▲1.52	15.92	▼13.09	14.54	▲5.97	13.00	▲2.96	3.42	▲0.80	2.16	New	1.77	▲0.73	1.84	▼0.41
Magnesia	43.59	▲4.83	19.24	▼12.92	8.10	▲1.52	7.22	▲1.89	4.13	▼0.21	3.13	New	3.54	▲2.05	2.81	▼0.97
Messenia	44.27	▼0.10	20.98	▼9.68	10.97	▲4.12	6.75	▲2.06	3.98	▲0.63	2.01	New	2.09	▲1.09	2.45	▼0.57
Pella	41.05	▼1.24	19.02	▼9.50	13.07	▲3.76	3.77	▲1.18	7.10	▲1.50	6.13	New	2.44	▲0.84	1.53	▼0.97
Phocis	46.23	▲1.48	19.31	▼9.85	9.82	▲2.47	8.01	▲1.97	3.13	▲0.12	1.90	New	2.40	▲1.17	1.93	▼1.07
Phthiotis	44.05	▲0.26	20.87	▼10.77	11.37	▲3.78	6.82	▲2.44	3.88	▲0.69	2.36	New	2.06	▲0.68	1.84	▼0.74
Pieria	41.09	▼6.36	15.33	▼8.00	12.44	▲3.92	5.20	▲1.22	7.56	▲1.83	7.46	New	2.44	▲0.94	2.06	▼0.72
Piraeus A	48.55	▲4.82	18.19	▼11.53	5.93	▲0.99	7.44	▲1.93	3.50	▲0.11	2.26	New	3.61	▲1.91	2.57	▼1.31
Piraeus B	37.44	▲7.25	20.75	▼17.47	7.41	▲2.32	10.83	▲2.81	4.70	▲0.50	2.34	New	4.28	▲2.22	2.93	▼1.47
Preveza	42.19	▼1.28	23.44	▼10.94	13.89	▲5.64	7.39	▲1.90	2.34	▲0.95	1.25	New	1.54	▲0.76	1.81	▼0.26
Rethymno	37.10	▲0.55	21.03	▼15.96	21.47	▲11.65	4.44	▲1.11	2.10	▼0.20	2.46	New	2.41	▲0.16	2.02	▼1.43
Rhodope	27.06	▼10.78	33.18	▲6.01	22.63	▲0.69	3.55	▼0.70	4.20	▲1.63	1.87	New	1.11	▲0.57	1.98	▲0.60
Samos	36.52	▲2.39	17.59	▼11.49	8.93	▲2.08	16.52	▲2.05	6.15	▲2.85	1.44	New	2.51	▲0.58	2.44	▼0.37
Serres	46.98	▼1.06	14.78	▼8.47	10.92	▲2.24	4.78	▲1.37	6.97	▲0.86	4.10	New	2.37	▲1.28	1.86	▼1.27
Thesprotia	42.66	▲1.52	22.67	▼8.87	14.77	▲1.49	5.49	▲1.76	2.58	▲0.77	1.76	New	1.73	▲0.94	1.81	▼0.69
Thessaloniki A	34.15	▼1.37	19.70	▼11.61	7.94	▲1.89	7.44	▲2.14	8.35	▲2.96	4.58	New	4.52	▲2.33	3.32	▼1.44
Thessaloniki B	40.07	▼2.95	15.15	▼9.99	10.17	▲3.52	6.20	▲1.59	7.93	▲2.28	5.63	New	3.67	▲1.95	2.45	▼1.61
Trikala	45.01	▲0.61	20.09	▼9.45	12.18	▲2.47	7.60	▲1.47	2.65	▼0.20	3.35	New	1.45	▲0.61	1.84	▼0.21
Xanthi	35.89	▼0.89	26.54	▼13.06	18.26	▲9.48	2.84	▲0.65	4.02	▲0.58	2.79	New	1.65	▲0.57	1.92	▼0.43
Zakynthos	40.96	▼0.95	20.90	▼10.54	10.87	▲5.50	10.81	▲1.77	2.50	▲0.29	1.54	New	1.99	▲0.77	2.39	▼0.93

=== Seat allocation with the current system ===
The seat allocation for the May 2023 election was done using purely proportional representation. Had a 50-seat bonus for the winning party been granted, as would have been the case in any other post-2007 election, the seats by region would have been allocated as following:

Region	ND		SYRIZA		PASOK		KKE		EL	
Region	S	±	S	±	S	±	S	±	S	±
Attica	50	▲3	17	▼2	5	▼1	11	0	6	0
Central Greece	9	▲3	3	0	2	▼1	1	▼1	–	▼1
Central Macedonia	31	▲7	8	▼4	4	▼2	2	0	4	▼1
Crete	8	▲1	3	0	4	0	1	▼1	–	0
Eastern Macedonia and Thrace	9	▲1	4	▼1	3	0	–	0	1	0
Epirus	5	▲1	3	▼1	1	0	1	0	–	0
Ionian Islands	4	0	1	0	1	0	–	0	–	0
North Aegean	3	0	1	0	2	0	–	0	–	0
Peloponnese	9	▲1	4	0	4	▼1	1	0	–	0
South Aegean	7	▲1	1	▼1	1	0	–	0	–	0
Thessaly	13	▲4	4	▼1	1	▼2	2	▼1	1	0
Western Greece	11	▲2	5	▼1	3	0	2	0	–	▼1
Western Macedonia	5	▲1	2	0	1	0	–	▼1	–	0
Greece	7	0	4	0	2	0	1	0	1	0
Total	171	▲25	60	▼11	34	▼7	22	▼4	13	▼3

== Analysis ==
Prime Minister Kyriakos Mitsotakis of centre-right party New Democracy routed his main rivals in the parliamentary election, unexpectedly increasing his party's share of the vote but falling just short of an outright majority. With half of votes counted, ruling New Democracy secured more than 40 per cent, building a lead of around 20 points over its nearest rival, Alexis Tsipras's Syriza party.

=== Aftermath ===
Mitsotakis declared victory, adding he would call a snap election. He said: "Greece needs a government that believes in reforms, and this cannot happen with a fragile government, New Democracy has the approval of the citizens to govern independently and strongly."

== See also ==
- List of members of the Hellenic Parliament, May 2023
