= June 2023 Greek parliamentary election =

- 25 June 2023

All 300 seats in the Hellenic Parliament 151 seats needed for a majority
- Opinion polls
- Registered: 9,813,595
- Turnout: 53.74% (▼7.36 pp)
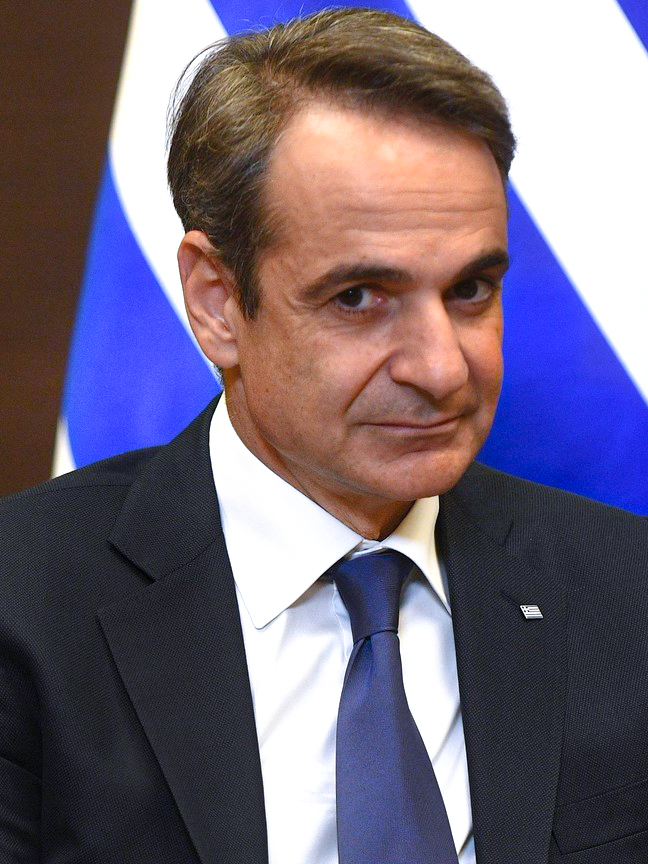

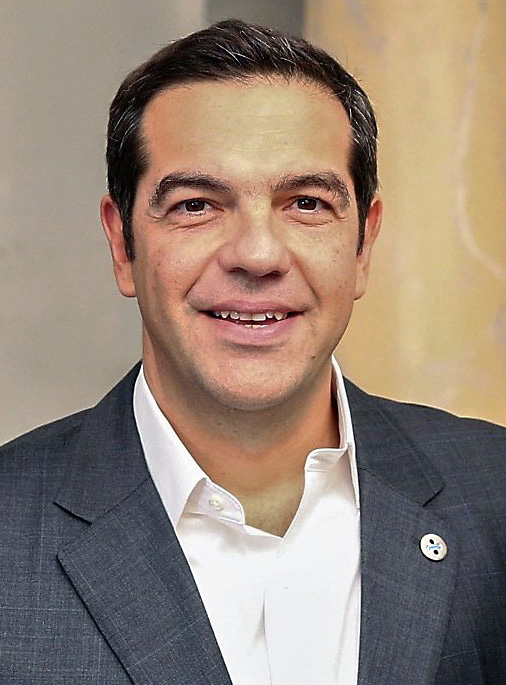

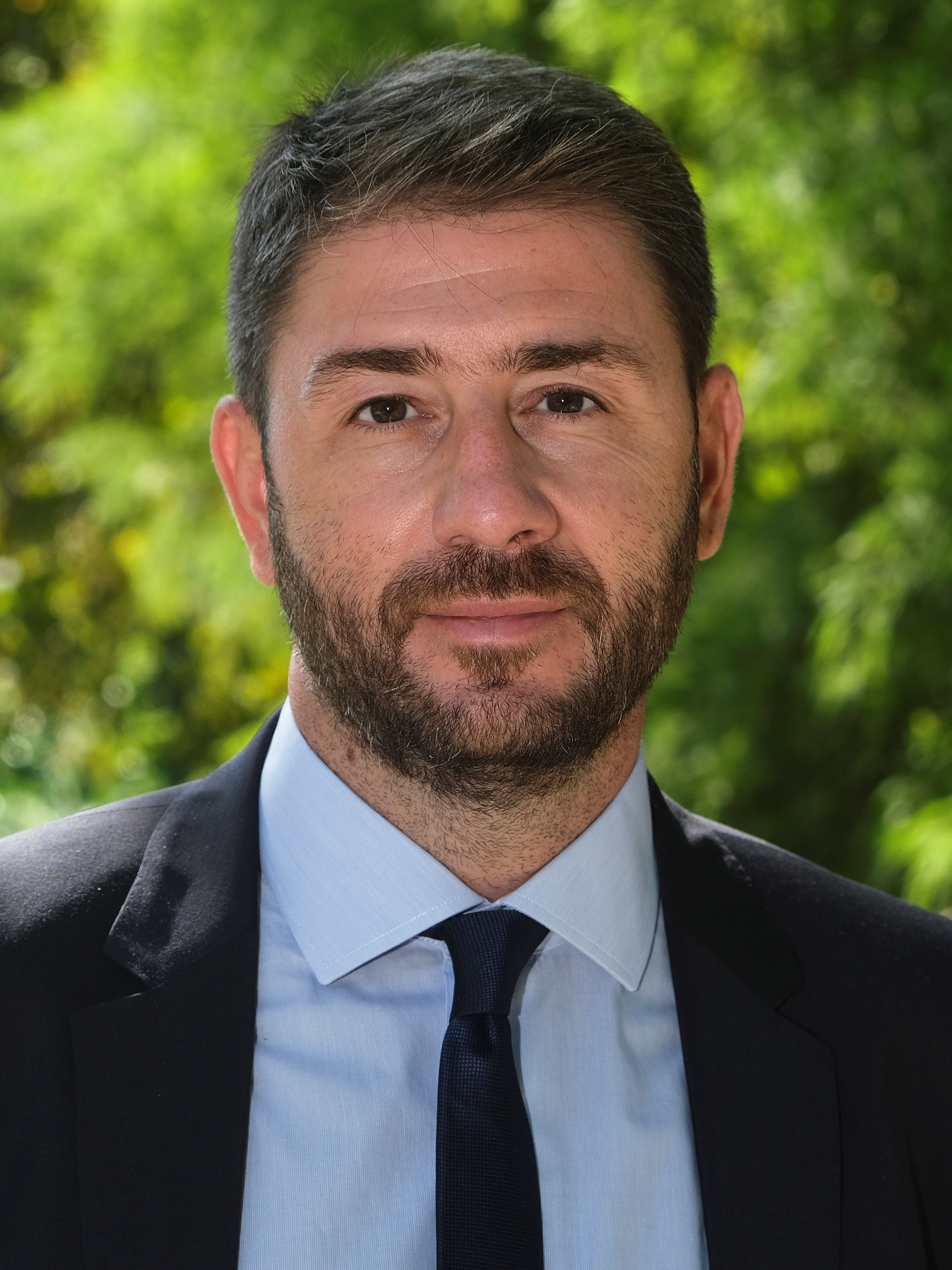

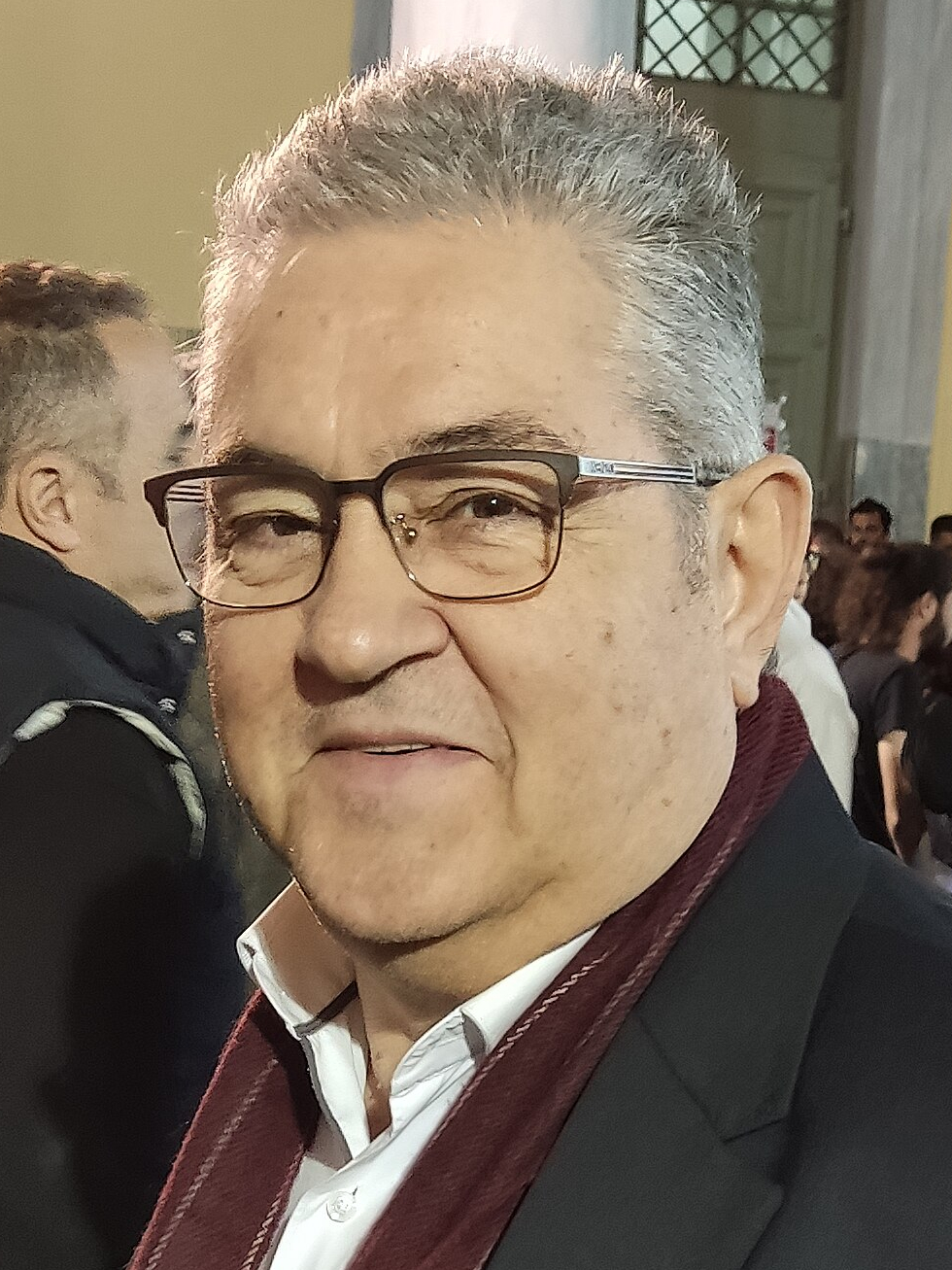

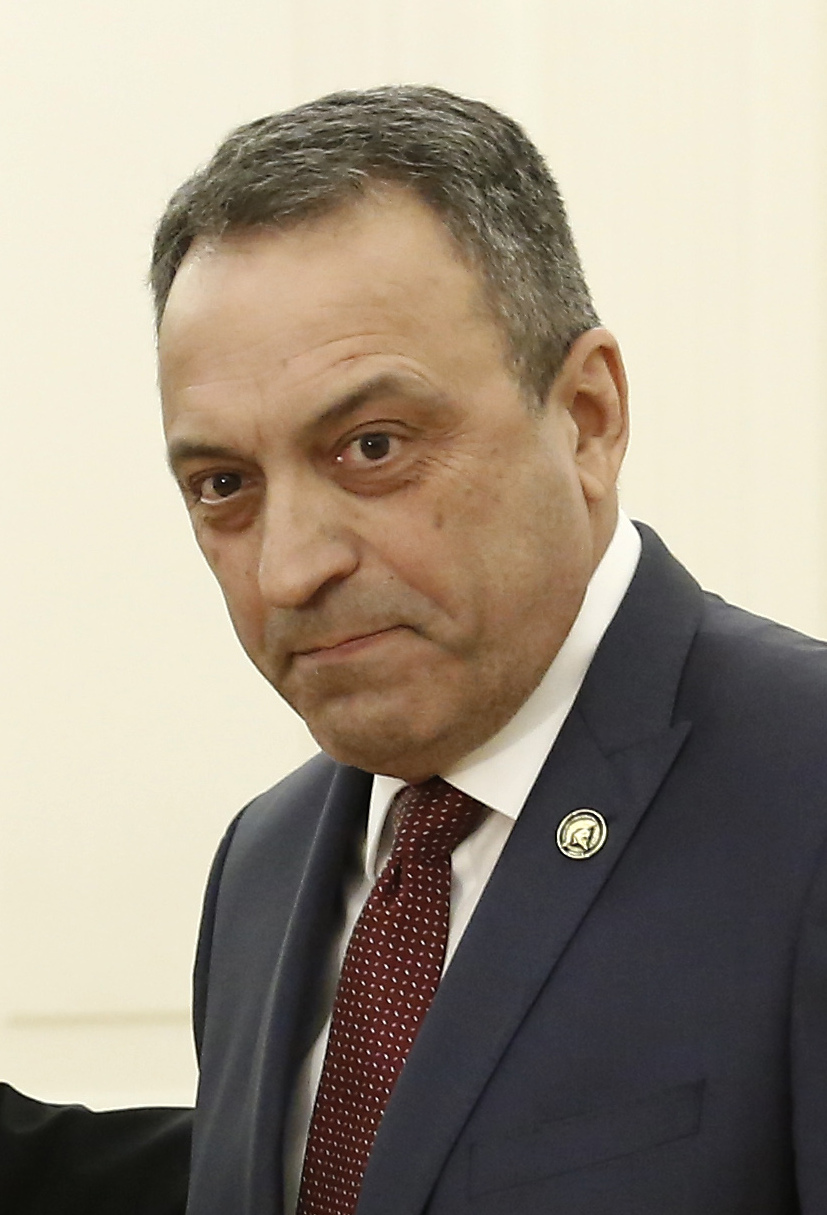

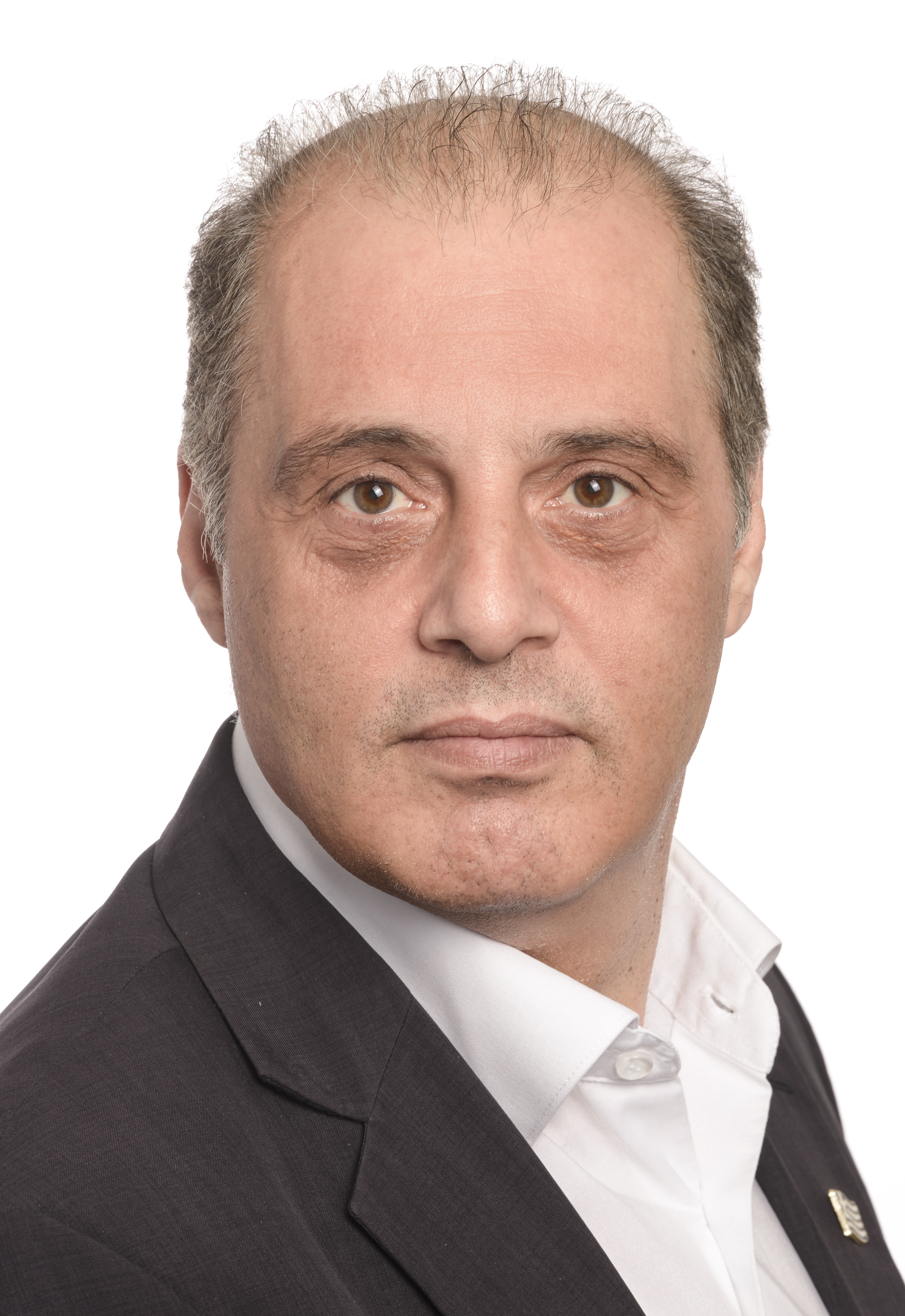

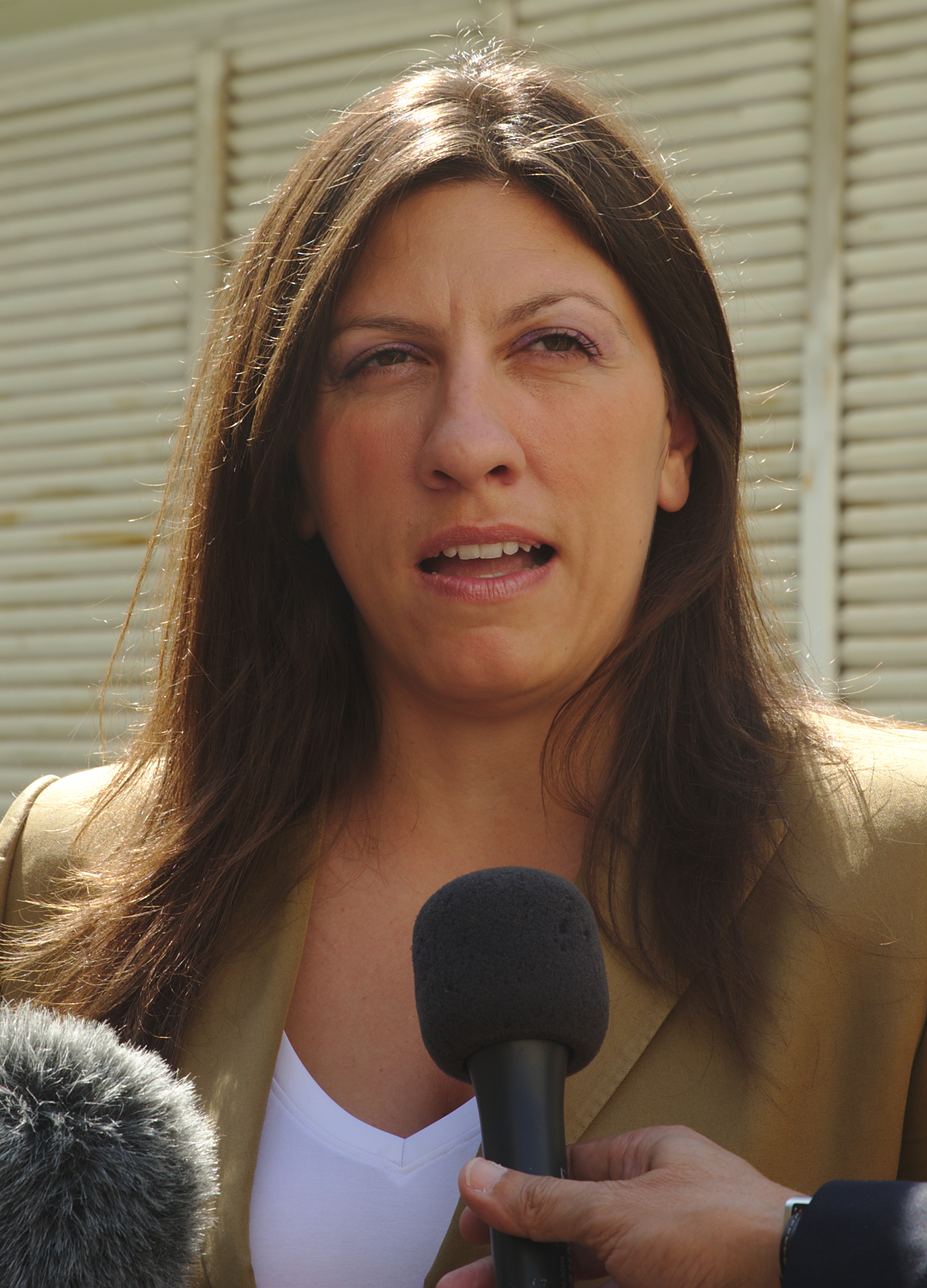
	First party	Second party	Third party
Leader	Kyriakos Mitsotakis	Alexis Tsipras	Nikos Androulakis
Party	New Democracy	Syriza	PASOK–KINAL
Last election	40.79%, 146 seats	20.07%, 71 seats	11.46%, 41 seats
Seats won	158	47	32
Seat change	▲12	▼24	▼9
Popular vote	2,115,322	930,013	617,487
Percentage	40.56%	17.83%	11.84%
Swing	▼0.23 pp	▼2.24 pp	▲0.38 pp
	Fourth party	Fifth party	Sixth party
Leader	Dimitris Koutsoumpas	Vasilis Stigkas	Kyriakos Velopoulos
Party	KKE	Spartans	EL
Last election	7.23%, 26 seats	–	4.45%, 16 seats
Seats won	21	12	12
Seat change	▼5	New	▼4
Popular vote	401,224	243,922	231,491
Percentage	7.69%	4.68%	4.44%
Swing	▲0.46 pp	New	▼0.01 pp
	Seventh party	Eighth party
Leader	Dimitris Natsios	Zoe Konstantopoulou
Party	NIKI	PE
Last election	2.92%, 0 seats	2.89%, 0 seats
Seats won	10	8
Seat change	▲10	▲8
Popular vote	193,124	165,523
Percentage	3.69%	3.17%
Swing	▲0.77 pp	▲0.28 pp
- Results by constituency
Prime Minister before election
Ioannis Sarmas
Independent
Prime Minister after election
Kyriakos Mitsotakis
ND

Snap parliamentary elections were held in Greece on 25 June 2023. All 300 seats in the Hellenic Parliament were contested. Prime Minister Kyriakos Mitsotakis called for the snap vote after the May 2023 elections did not result in any party gaining a majority, although his centre-right New Democracy made unanticipated gains and increased its share of the vote. As a result, no coalition government was formed by any of the parties eligible to do so.

In contrast to the May elections, the June vote used a majority bonus system, making a majority government more likely. On 25 May 2023, as required by Greece's constitution, President Katerina Sakellaropoulou appointed Ioannis Sarmas as caretaker prime minister until the formation of the next government following the elections.

New Democracy increased their number of seats in parliament, achieving a majority, while the main opposition Syriza lost seats. Minor parties Spartans, Victory, and Course of Freedom entered parliament for the first time.

== Electoral system ==
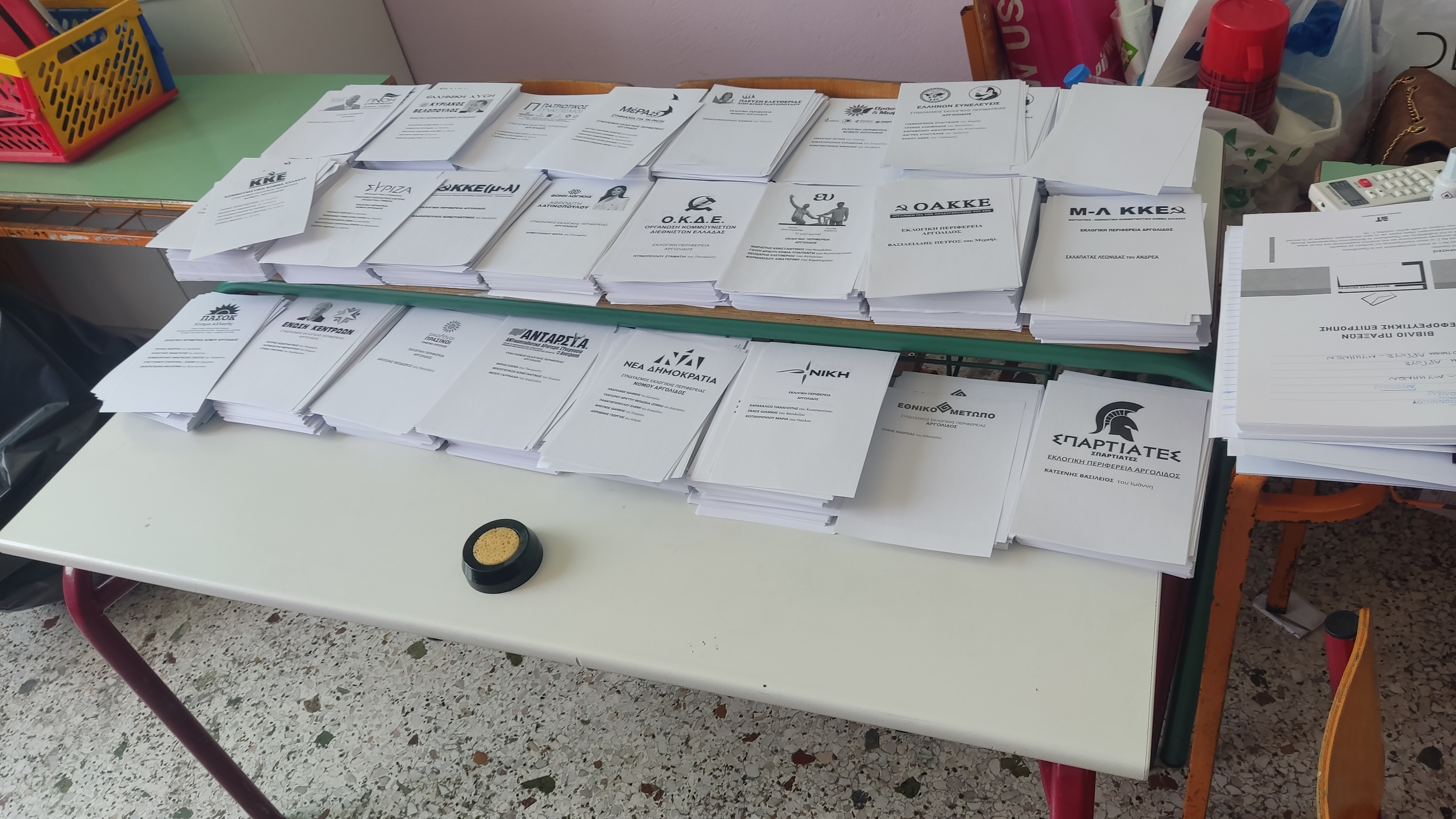
The ballots in a polling station in Argos

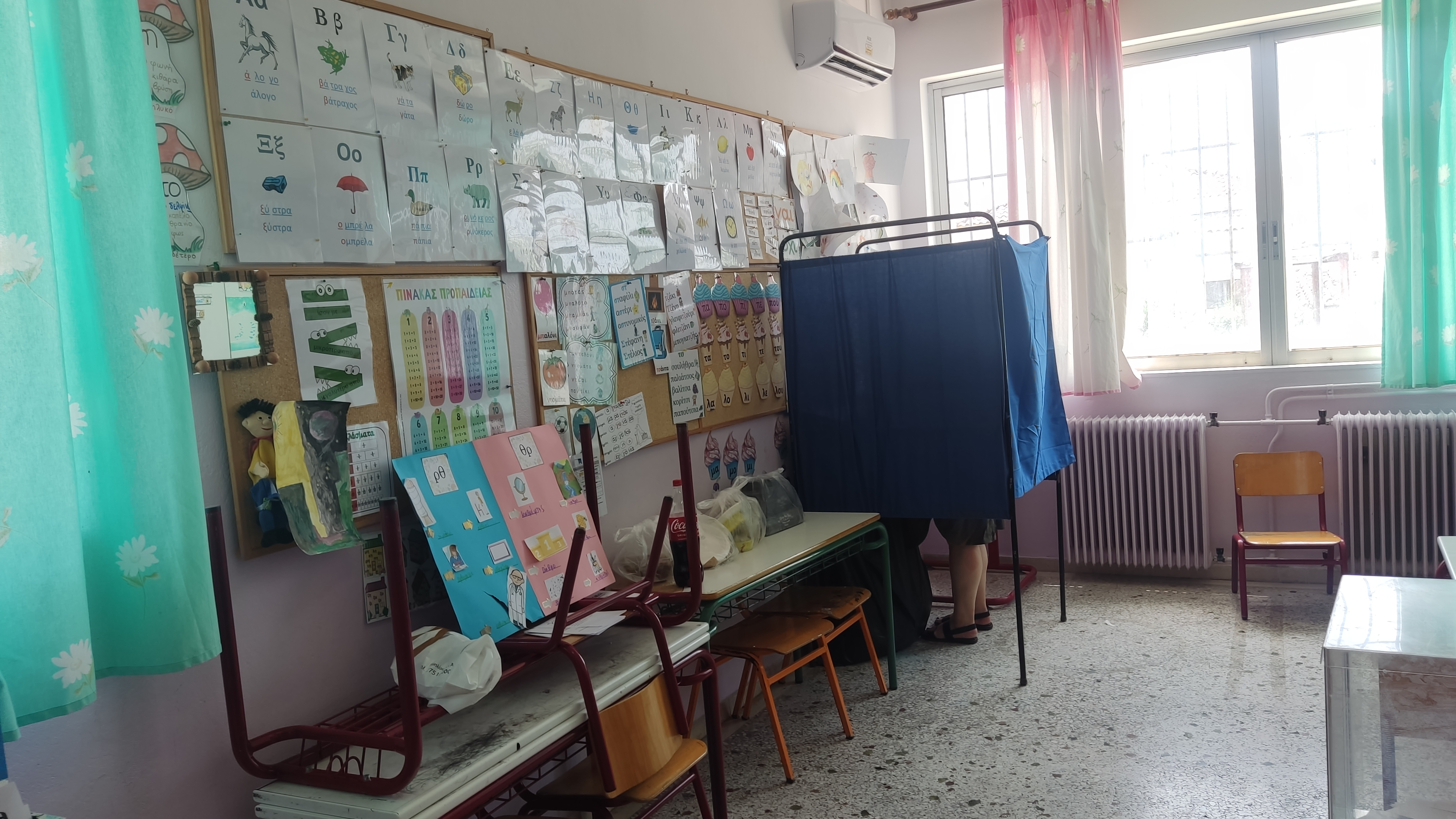
The polling booth in a polling station in Argos

New Democracy has been a proponent of majority bonuses since 1974. Soon after returning to power in the 2019 parliamentary election, they passed a new electoral law to reinstate the bonus that had been eliminated by the SYRIZA-ANEL coalition government's 2016 law (which established a purely proportional system with a 3% electoral threshold), albeit under a very different formula. The party list coming first with at least 25% of the votes would receive 20 extra seats, with one more seat for every half percentage point above 25%, to a maximum of 50 extra seats at 40% (or more) of the votes. Once this bonus has been attributed, the proper proportional distribution begins for the remaining seats, which can range from 250 if one party gathered at least 40%, to 300 if no party reached 25%. This 2020 law would take effect starting from the next Greek election after the May 2023 election.

A 2019 law granted the right to vote for Greeks abroad who have lived for two years in Greece during the previous 35 years and who have submitted a tax return during the year of the election or the previous year. Voters from abroad choose the national-wide ballot of their desired party without choosing candidates, and their vote is counted equally in final results. Voting is theoretically compulsory, with voter registration being automatic, but the penalties and sanctions in place for those who do not vote are unenforced.

== Contesting parties, alliances and independents ==
On 8 June 2023 the Supreme Court ruled that 26 political parties, 4 alliances and 2 independents had met the criteria to contest the election. Nineteen of these had also participated in the previous election. The names of the 32 entities are listed below in alphabetical order.

1. Anticapitalist Left Cooperation for the Overthrow
2. Assembly of Greeks
3. Athanasios Georgiou (Independent)
4. Breath of Democracy
5. Communist Party of Greece
6. Communist Party of Greece (Marxist–Leninist)
7. Course of Freedom
8. Digital Hellenism in the Whole
9. Ecologist Greens – Green Unity
10. Greek Ecologists
11. Greek Solution
12. Green & Purple
13. Marxist–Leninist Communist Party of Greece
14. European Realistic Disobedience Front 25
15. Movement of the Poor
16. National Front
17. New Democracy
18. Organization for the Reconstruction of the Communist Party of Greece
19. Organisation of Internationalist Communists of Greece
20. Panathinaikos Movement
21. Panhellenic Socialist Movement – Movement for Change
22. Patriotic Coalition
23. Popular European Party
24. Republican Party of Greece – Technocratic Republican Reforming Front of Patriots
25. Spartans
26. Spentzas Polykarpos, Radio Operator of the Ship "Pothiti", 1978 – Bermuda Triangle – UFO – USO Extraterrestrials – Einstein – Santorinis Pavlos (Independent)
27. Syriza – Progressive Alliance
28. Union of Centrists
29. Democratic Patriotic Movement – Victory
30. Vision for the Greek Renaissance
31. Voice of Reason
32. Well – Movement

=== Main Parties ===
Party or alliance	Leader	Ideology	Slogan	English translation
ND	Kyriakos Mitsotakis	Liberal conservatism	«Σταθερά, Τολμηρά, Μπροστά»	"Steady, Boldly, Forward"
SYRIZA	Alexis Tsipras	Social democracy	«Δίκαιη Κοινωνία. Ευημερία για Όλους»	"Just Society. Prosperity for All"
PASOK-KINAL	Nikos Androulakis	Social democracy	«Απόφαση αλλαγής»	"Decision for change"
KKE	Dimitris Koutsoumpas	Communism	«100% Λαϊκή, Μαχητική Αντιπολίτευση»	"100% People's, Fighting Opposition"
SP	Vasilis Stigkas	Ultranationalism	«Για την πιο ισχυρή Εθνική Αντιπολίτευση»	"For the strongest National Opposition"
EL	Kyriakos Velopoulos	National conservatism	«Πρώτα η Ελλάδα, Πρώτα οι Έλληνες»	"Greece First, Greeks First"
NIKI	Dimitris Natsios	Religious conservatism	«Διεκδικούμε την Ελλάδα που μας αξίζει»	"We claim the Greece we deserve"
PE	Zoe Konstantopoulou	Progressivism	«Δώσε Ζωή στην Βουλή»	"Give Life (Zoe) to the Parliament"
M25	Yanis Varoufakis	Progressivism	«Θέλεις αυτήν τη φωνή στη Βουλή;»	"Do you want this voice on in parliament?"

== Opinion polls ==
Local regression trend line of poll results from 21 May 2023 to the present day, with each line corresponding to a political party and a 7-day average compared to the May election

== Results ==
New Democracy won 41% of the vote, which allowed it to gain 50 bonus seats. This led to New Democracy winning a majority of seats. Syriza won nearly 18% of the vote. The newly created Spartans party won 4.7% of the vote, which allowed it to enter Parliament. Overall, eight parties crossed the 3% threshold to enter Parliament. The turnout was at 54%, which was 7 pp lower than the turnout in the May election. Reacting to his party's victory, Mitsotakis said, "The people have given us a safe majority. Major reforms will go ahead quickly." According to political analyst Nick Malkoutzis, "Mitsotakis has been rewarded by voters as the leader who has led Greece out of a severe debt crisis and three international bailouts back into a growth path. Someone who has kept, at least some, of his pledges which is more than many in Greece had previously done."

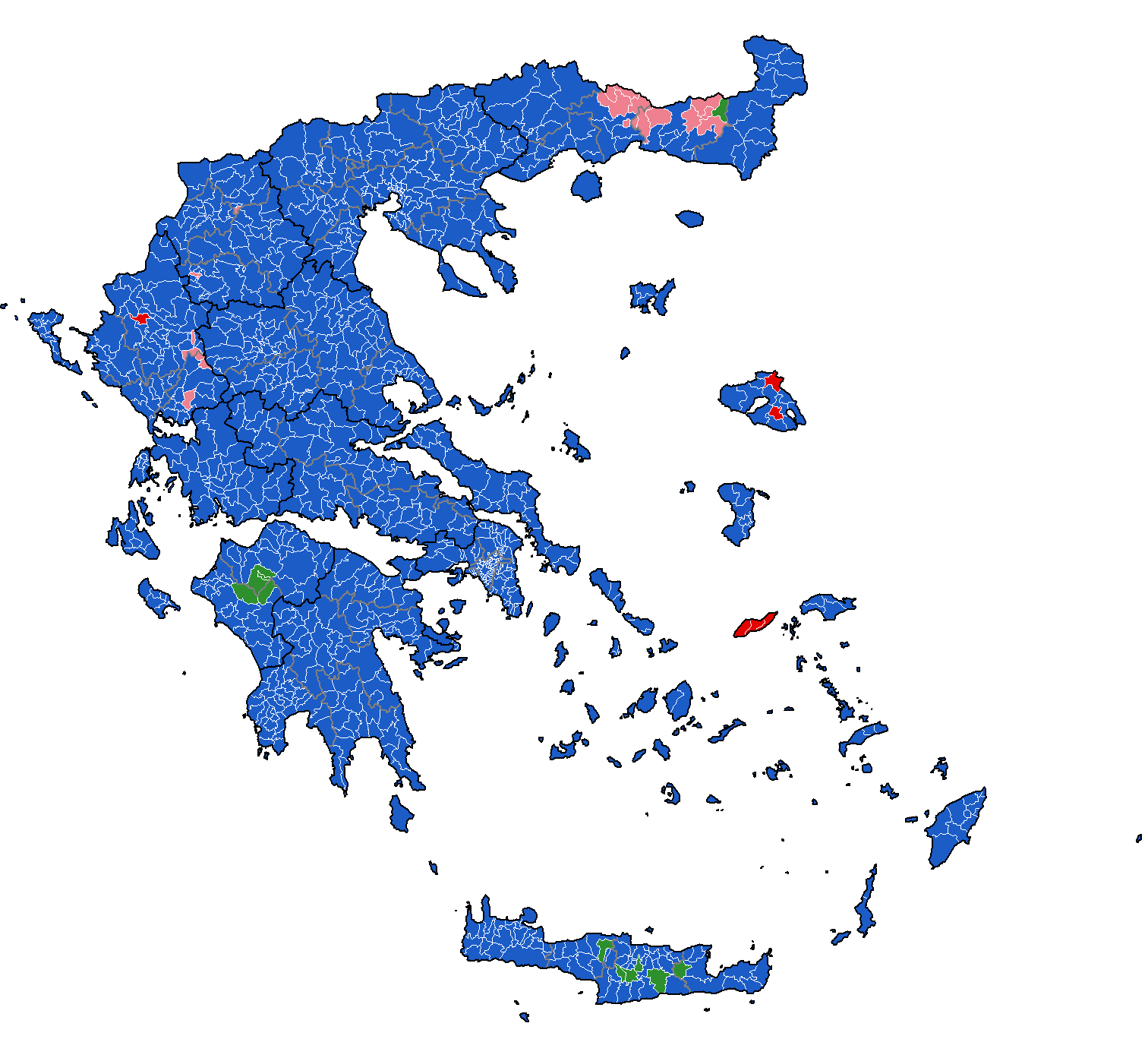
Results, showing the winning party in each municipal unit: ND (989) SYRIZA (18) PASOK (11) KKE (6)

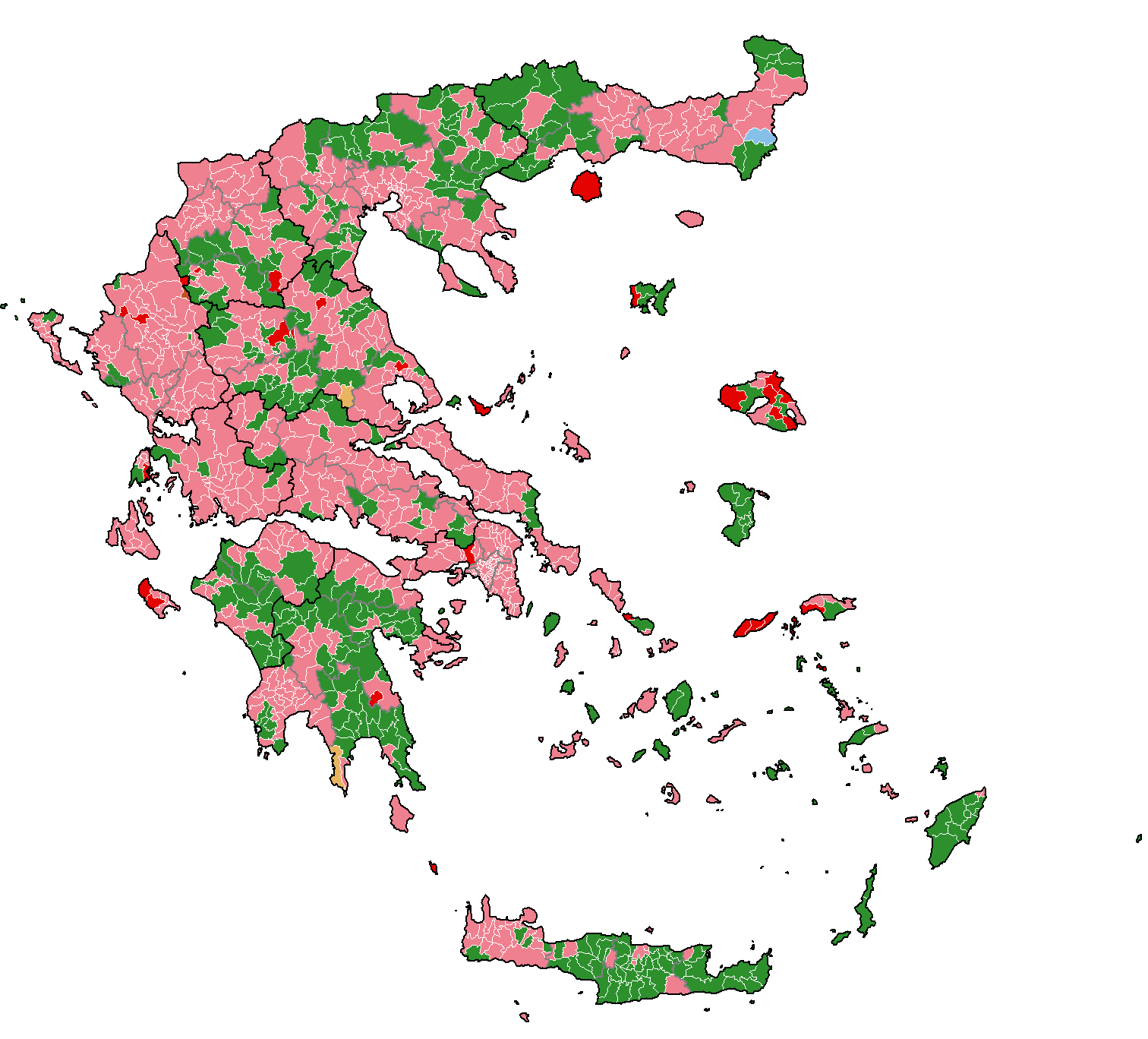
Results, showing the best-placed party in each municipal unit, other than New Democracy

=== Largest and smallest percentages for each elected party ===
Results, showing the winning party in each precinct. ND (6419) SYRIZA (373) PASOK (330) KKE (77) Spartiates (2) EL (2) Niki (2) PE (1) PS (1)

Party	Votes	%	Seats	±
New Democracy	2,115,322	40.56	158	+12
Syriza	930,013	17.83	47	–24
PASOK – Movement for Change	617,487	11.84	32	–9
Communist Party of Greece	401,224	7.69	21	–5
Spartans	243,922	4.68	12	New
Greek Solution	231,491	4.44	12	–4
Victory	193,124	3.70	10	+10
Course of Freedom	165,523	3.17	8	+8
MeRA25	130,378	2.50	0	0
Patriotic Coalition (Note: Coalition of Patriotic Force – Prodromos Emfietzoglou, Patriotic Force for Change, K21, ELXA, TOLMA, PS, and other smaller parties.)	25,858	0.50	0	New
Voice of Reason	22,347	0.43	0	New
Ecologist Greens – Green Unity	21,188	0.41	0	0
Ef Movement	17,181	0.33	0	New
Antarsya	15,887	0.30	0	0
Prasino & Mov	15,725	0.30	0	New
Breath of Democracy	14,781	0.28	0	0
Union of Centrists	14,286	0.27	0	0
Movement of the Poor of Greece	13,652	0.26	0	0
Communist Party of Greece (Marxist–Leninist)	9,420	0.18	0	0
Assembly of Greeks	6,408	0.12	0	0
Marxist–Leninist Communist Party of Greece	4,250	0.08	0	0
National Front	2,965	0.06	0	New
Organisation of Internationalist Communists of Greece	1,374	0.03	0	0
Organization for the Reconstruction of the KKE	1,104	0.02	0	0
Vision of the Renaissance of Greece	132	0.00	0	New
Panathinaikos Movement	122	0.00	0	0
Digital Hellenism in the Whole	23	0.00	0	New
People's European Party	17	0.00	0	New
Republican Party of Greece – TRAMP	3	0.00	0	New
Greek Ecologists	0	0.00	0	0
Independents	0	0.00	0	0
Total	5,215,207	100.00	300	0
Valid votes	5,215,207	98.89		
Invalid votes	32,219	0.61		
Blank votes	26,273	0.50		
Total votes	5,273,699	100.00		
Registered voters/turnout	9,813,595	53.74		
Source: Ministry of Interior

=== Parties' performance ===
New Democracy's vote share	SYRIZA's vote share	PASOK's vote share
Communist Party's vote share	Spartans' vote share	Greek Solution's vote share
Victory's vote share	Course of Freedom's vote share	MeRA25's vote share

=== By region ===
Region	ND		SYRIZA		PASOK		KKE		Spartans		EL		Victory		PE		MERA25	
Region	%	S	%	S	%	S	%	S	%	S	%	S	%	S	%	S	%	S
Attica	42.81	41	18.19	12	7.77	5	9.59	10	4.37	6	3.64	6	2.86	4	3.68	6	3.24	–
Central Greece	40.27	9	17.77	3	13.14	2	7.71	1	5.17	–	4.32	–	3.22	–	3.12	–	1.99	–
Central Macedonia	38.77	25	15.25	8	10.66	3	6.40	2	5.27	2	7.65	4	6.15	3	3.51	2	2.34	–
Crete	37.27	8	19.02	1	20.76	5	5.94	1	3.77	1	2.48	–	2.31	–	2.79	–	2.51	–
Eastern Macedonia and Thrace	37.85	10	20.21	3	15.15	3	4.03	–	4.95	–	6.01	1	4.23	–	2.22	–	1.70	–
Epirus	39.60	6	23.13	3	13.42	1	7.61	–	3.62	–	2.86	–	2.63	–	2.05	–	2.06	–
Ionian Islands	38.15	4	18.24	1	12.05	1	10.65	–	4.99	–	3.03	–	2.14	–	4.74	–	2.62	–
North Aegean	40.82	3	12.98	–	15.08	2	13.19	1	3.91	–	3.70	–	2.60	–	2.43	–	1.77	–
Peloponnese	43.44	11	16.27	4	13.77	3	5.84	–	5.77	–	3.86	–	3.15	–	2.72	–	2.12	–
South Aegean	46.85	8	13.52	–	13.64	1	4.94	–	5.04	–	4.23	–	3.00	–	3.29	–	1.99	–
Thessaly	41.18	13	17.24	3	12.81	1	8.49	2	4.80	1	3.56	–	3.91	1	2.55	–	1.99	–
Western Greece	36.43	9	21.97	4	15.24	3	6.93	2	4.56	2	3.50	–	3.72	1	2.94	–	1.86	–
Western Macedonia	38.04	5	18.18	2	14.48	1	6.53	–	4.37	–	4.77	–	5.54	–	2.46	–	2.05	–
Greece	40.56	7	17.83	3	11.84	2	7.69	1	4.68	–	4.44	1	3.70	1	3.17	–	2.50	–

=== By constituency ===
Constituency	ND		SYRIZA		PASOK		KKE		Spartans		EL		Victory		PE		MERA25	
Constituency	%	±	%	±	%	±	%	±	%	±	%	±	%	±	%	±	%	±
Achaea	34.04	▲0.09	23.20	▼3.81	13.70	▲1.28	7.57	▲0.77	4.19	New	3.90	▲0.22	4.33	▲0.61	3.51	▲0.58	2.38	▼0.12
Aetolia-Acarnania	38.85	▼0.63	21.64	▼4.20	14.20	▲0.67	7.09	▲0.81	5.01	New	2.81	▲0.30	3.96	▲0.93	2.23	▲0.50	1.60	▼0.09
Argolis	43.28	▼0.25	15.25	▼2.50	15.01	▼0.58	5.26	▲0.14	5.39	New	3.87	▲0.23	3.43	▲0.58	2.52	▲0.24	2.47	▼0.46
Arcadia	41.51	▲0.78	16.86	▼2.28	16.28	▼1.56	6.50	▲0.06	4.47	New	3.67	▲0.46	2.86	▲0.84	2.84	▲0.64	1.85	▼0.12
Arta	37.50	▲0.86	28.94	▼2.81	10.84	▼0.12	7.65	▲0.15	3.58	New	2.62	▲0.21	2.36	▲0.45	1.79	▲0.29	2.10	▼0.32
Athens A	43.27	▲1.09	19.97	▼2.58	6.86	▲0.16	8.90	▲0.30	4.22	New	2.95	▼0.07	2.63	▲0.67	3.39	▲0.04	4.03	▲0.43
Athens B1 – North Athens	47.32	▲1.30	16.95	▼1.81	7.64	▲0.24	8.98	▲0.35	3.08	New	2.64	▼0.05	2.73	▲0.66	3.42	▲0.24	3.71	▲0.21
Athens B2 – West Athens	34.66	▲0.20	21.13	▼1.60	8.92	▲0.12	12.14	▲0.74	5.02	New	4.02	▼0.07	2.81	▲0.57	4.05	▲0.04	3.05	▼0.27
Athens B3 – South Athens	42.32	▲0.76	18.66	▼1.88	7.91	▲0.37	10.17	▲0.49	3.76	New	3.35	▼0.01	2.73	▲0.67	3.68	▲0.24	3.57	▲0.16
East Attica	46.66	▲1.15	17.62	0.00	8.00	▼0.15	7.19	▲0.33	4.88	New	4.60	▼0.29	3.18	▲0.84	3.63	▲0.31	2.60	▼0.14
West Attica	39.74	▼2.16	15.83	▼2.37	8.04	▲0.61	10.11	▲0.98	7.61	New	5.95	▼0.74	3.44	▲0.88	3.15	▲0.06	1.87	▼0.32
Boeotia	37.12	▼0.14	18.31	▼2.54	14.07	▲0.10	8.89	▼0.01	5.37	New	4.35	▲0.35	3.42	▲0.79	3.12	▲0.30	2.05	▼0.22
Cephalonia	38.15	▲1.48	19.69	▼6.39	10.44	▲0.70	12.36	▲1.41	4.90	New	2.92	0.00	1.96	▲0.90	3.86	▲0.33	1.96	▼0.77
Chalkidiki	39.54	▼0.38	13.70	▼1.57	14.52	▲0.47	4.67	▲0.08	5.55	New	6.30	▼0.49	6.56	▲1.17	3.13	▲0.19	2.16	▼0.55
Chania	40.52	▼0.63	18.44	▼2.20	11.21	▲0.29	8.42	▲1.23	4.64	New	3.10	▼0.37	2.73	▲0.79	3.71	▲0.71	3.05	▼0.23
Chios	46.49	▲0.35	10.52	▼1.84	19.89	▲0.59	6.67	▼0.11	3.59	New	2.97	▼0.04	2.48	▲0.76	2.40	▲0.16	1.80	▼0.43
Corfu	36.74	▼0.34	18.56	▼1.43	12.06	▼0.26	8.74	▲0.08	5.36	New	3.34	▼0.03	2.38	▲0.62	6.39	▲1.30	2.98	▼0.17
Corinthia	41.83	▲0.23	17.27	▼2.58	13.66	▼0.48	4.37	▲0.23	5.64	New	4.26	▲0.29	4.39	▲0.81	3.16	▲0.41	2.32	▼0.14
Cyclades	46.68	▼0.87	14.14	▼1.81	12.44	▲1.16	5.74	▲0.11	3.99	New	3.93	▲0.29	2.96	▲0.72	3.75	▲0.88	2.59	▼0.29
Dodecanese	46.97	▼2.96	13.07	▼1.82	14.52	▲1.10	4.34	▲0.34	5.81	New	4.46	▼0.16	3.03	▲0.81	2.95	▲0.15	1.56	▼0.27
Drama	39.39	▼0.02	13.27	▼0.62	15.25	▼1.68	4.07	▲0.14	6.01	New	6.83	▼0.07	6.33	▲1.00	2.98	▲0.06	2.03	▼0.08
Elis	37.45	▼0.24	20.13	▼3.78	19.74	▲0.45	5.48	▲0.48	4.59	New	3.77	▲0.41	2.20	▲0.68	2.88	▲0.76	1.27	▼0.11
Euboea	38.63	▲1.47	17.77	▼1.08	12.99	▼2.24	7.64	▲0.50	5.30	New	4.89	▼0.33	3.21	▲0.95	3.89	▲0.47	2.18	▼0.30
Evros	44.18	▲0.87	15.00	▼3.67	12.56	▲0.22	3.78	▼0.10	5.46	New	8.72	0.00	3.47	▲0.65	1.76	▲0.12	1.38	▲0.23
Evrytania	41.22	▼3.95	19.51	▼3.31	15.98	▲4.74	5.38	▼0.10	3.79	New	3.05	▲0.14	4.43	▲1.22	2.49	▲0.94	1.76	▼0.03
Florina	34.42	▼3.70	21.81	▼2.93	15.12	▲2.00	5.65	▲0.76	4.31	New	5.13	▲0.42	5.37	▲1.35	2.34	▲0.29	1.93	▼0.41
Grevena	39.81	▼4.50	17.98	▼3.87	16.47	▲3.50	8.12	▲1.24	4.19	New	3.80	▲0.89	3.37	▲0.87	2.10	▲0.44	1.58	▲0.06
Heraklion	35.16	▼0.31	20.52	▼2.41	22.98	▲1.17	5.50	▲0.38	3.77	New	2.23	▼0.02	2.03	▲0.69	2.44	▲0.68	2.51	▼0.39
Imathia	39.18	▼1.69	14.73	▼2.92	11.75	▲0.42	5.98	▲0.17	5.81	New	8.21	▲0.40	5.48	▲0.91	3.14	▲0.31	1.79	▼0.15
Ioannina	38.71	▲0.78	22.42	▼1.94	13.53	▼0.98	8.01	▲0.86	3.49	New	3.06	▲0.11	3.16	▲0.68	2.18	▲0.44	2.20	▲0.05
Karditsa	43.09	▼3.29	16.67	▼3.14	16.58	▲2.88	7.51	▲0.24	4.88	New	2.82	▲0.11	2.74	▲0.86	1.71	▲0.18	1.34	▼0.16
Kastoria	44.79	▼2.05	16.61	▼4.39	11.52	▲2.91	4.09	▲0.28	4.78	New	5.32	▲0.26	4.99	▲1.08	2.39	▲0.22	2.33	▼0.18
Kavala	42.69	▼0.96	14.15	▼2.01	12.38	▲1.05	5.58	▲0.27	5.43	New	5.40	▲0.03	5.53	▲1.16	2.86	▲0.28	2.08	▼0.35
Kilkis	39.63	▼0.98	12.63	▼1.02	14.32	▼3.02	6.69	▲0.25	5.50	New	7.13	▲0.20	6.98	▲1.73	2.57	▲0.11	1.61	▼0.21
Kozani	36.69	▼1.94	17.48	▼3.26	14.75	▲1.54	7.26	▲1.13	4.30	New	4.69	▲0.21	6.27	▲1.38	2.61	▲0.36	2.11	▼0.15
Laconia	47.83	▼1.95	12.80	▼1.02	14.77	▼0.44	5.06	▼0.11	7.48	New	3.51	▼0.38	2.25	▲0.56	2.38	▼0.22	1.41	▼0.25
Larissa	39.35	▼0.88	17.53	▼2.30	12.25	▲0.34	9.29	▲0.69	5.13	New	3.88	▼0.14	4.10	▲0.79	2.57	▲0.44	2.05	▼0.45
Lasithi	39.75	▼0.23	14.62	▼3.14	25.58	▲4.10	4.76	▲0.08	2.94	New	2.57	▲0.21	2.08	▲0.47	2.52	▲0.29	2.36	▼0.34
Lefkada	41.71	▼0.72	17.52	▼2.40	12.39	▲0.39	11.80	▲0.40	3.46	New	1.98	▲0.34	1.91	▲0.45	2.71	▲0.58	2.92	▲0.39
Lesbos	39.81	▼0.70	13.49	▼2.43	14.69	▲0.15	14.64	▲1.64	4.11	New	3.47	▲0.05	2.84	▲0.68	2.06	▲0.29	1.46	▼0.38
Magnesia	42.39	▼1.20	17.25	▼1.99	9.37	▲1.27	7.90	▲0.68	4.90	New	4.09	▲0.04	4.04	▲0.91	3.67	▲0.13	2.62	▼0.19
Messenia	43.71	▼0.56	17.50	▼3.48	11.14	▲0.17	7.44	▲0.69	5.96	New	3.81	▼0.17	2.59	▲0.58	2.57	▲0.48	2.28	▼0.17
Pella	38.41	▼2.64	18.40	▼0.62	12.49	▼0.58	3.75	▼0.02	5.13	New	7.65	▲0.55	7.15	▲1.02	2.65	▲0.21	1.29	▼0.24
Phocis	44.65	▼1.58	16.10	▼3.21	11.60	▲1.78	8.09	▲0.08	4.58	New	3.65	▲0.52	2.77	▲0.87	3.11	▲0.71	2.20	▲0.27
Phthiotis	43.30	▼0.75	17.57	▼3.30	12.68	▲1.31	7.24	▲0.42	5.21	New	3.91	▲0.03	3.05	▲0.69	2.22	▲0.16	1.67	▼0.17
Pieria	38.80	▼2.29	13.63	▼1.70	13.11	▲0.67	5.13	▼0.07	5.56	New	7.00	▼0.56	9.26	▲1.80	2.63	▲0.19	1.67	▼0.39
Piraeus A	47.27	▼1.28	16.58	▼1.61	6.70	▲0.77	8.02	▲0.58	4.57	New	3.54	▲0.04	3.08	▲0.82	3.92	▲0.31	2.57	0.00
Piraeus B	37.24	▼0.20	19.36	▼1.39	7.60	▲0.19	11.49	▲0.66	5.60	New	4.53	▼0.17	3.01	▲0.67	4.41	▲0.13	2.54	▼0.39
Preveza	41.58	▼0.61	20.95	▼2.49	15.01	▲1.12	7.92	▲0.53	3.78	New	2.64	▲0.30	1.83	▲0.58	1.89	▲0.35	1.84	▲0.03
Rethymno	36.67	▼0.43	18.71	▼2.32	25.71	▲4.24	4.08	▼0.36	2.99	New	2.20	▲0.10	2.78	▲0.32	2.63	▲0.22	1.69	▼0.33
Rhodope	28.89	▲1.83	33.60	▲0.42	19.00	▼3.63	3.16	▼0.39	3.13	New	4.13	▼0.07	2.65	▲0.78	1.34	▲0.23	1.42	▼0.56
Samos	36.05	▼0.47	14.88	▼2.71	9.93	▲1.00	17.69	▲1.17	3.85	New	5.18	▼0.97	2.17	▲0.73	3.35	▲0.84	2.44	0.00
Serres	45.64	▼1.34	12.88	▼1.90	11.45	▲0.53	5.02	▲0.24	5.17	New	7.24	▲0.27	4.69	▲0.59	2.60	▲0.23	1.68	▼0.18
Thesprotia	43.33	▲0.67	19.13	▼3.54	15.07	▲0.30	5.83	▲0.34	3.86	New	2.89	▲0.31	2.34	▲0.58	2.21	▲0.48	1.77	▼0.04
Thessaloniki A	35.28	▲1.13	17.52	▼2.18	8.14	▲0.20	8.17	▲0.73	5.03	New	7.97	▼0.38	5.36	▲0.78	4.44	▼0.08	3.36	▲0.04
Thessaloniki B	40.11	▲0.04	13.58	▼1.57	9.85	▼0.32	6.62	▲0.42	5.29	New	7.95	▲0.02	6.49	▲0.86	3.78	▲0.11	2.27	▼0.18
Trikala	41.40	▼3.61	17.18	▼2.91	14.86	▲2.68	8.60	▲1.00	3.97	New	2.94	▲0.29	4.44	▲1.09	1.85	▲0.40	1.64	▼0.20
Xanthi	30.32	▼5.57	28.49	▲1.95	18.36	▲0.10	3.22	▲0.38	4.40	New	3.98	▼0.04	3.16	▲0.37	2.19	▲0.54	1.62	▼0.30
Zakynthos	39.21	▼1.75	16.40	▼4.50	13.47	▲2.60	12.82	▲2.01	5.17	New	2.88	▲0.38	1.87	▲0.33	2.92	▲0.93	2.22	▼0.17

== See also ==
- List of members of the Hellenic Parliament, June 2023
