= Opinion polling for the 2023 Greek legislative election =

The term Opinion polling for the 2023 Greek legislative election may refer to:

- Opinion polling for the May 2023 Greek legislative election
- Opinion polling for the June 2023 Greek legislative election
