= Afroditi Theopeftatou =

Greek politician and civil engineer

- Αφροδίτη Θεοπεφτάτου

Member of the Hellenic Parliament for Cephalonia
- In office 2012–2019

Personal details
- Born: 23 May 1957 (age 69)
- Party: SYRIZA
- Education: University of Patras

Afroditi Theopeftatou (Greek: Αφροδίτη Θεοπεφτάτου; born 23 May 1957) is a Greek civil engineer and politician, member of the Council of the Hellenes from 2012 until 11 January 2019. Born in Athens, she is a graduate of the Polytechnic School of the University of Patras and worked as a civil engineer.

During her student years she was a member of the Greek Communist Youth – Rigas Feraios. She was elected MP of Cephalonia with SYRIZA in the May and June 2012 elections and in the January and September 2015 elections.

She also was the secretary of the SYRIZA Parliamentary Group.
