= Evrytania (constituency) =

Parliamentary constituency of Greece

- Constituency for the Hellenic Parliament
- Evrytania within Central Greece

- Central Greece within Greece
- Region: Central Greece
- Electorate: 33,785 (May 2012)

Current constituency
- Number of members: One
- Member: Konstantinos Kontogeorgios New Democracy

Evrytania is a constituency in Central Greece represented in the Hellenic Parliament. This constituency corresponds to Evrytania prefecture. It elects one Member of Parliament (MP) by the Reinforced proportional representation system of election.

== Election Results ==
=== Parliamentary ===
2000

2004

2007

2009

5/2012

6/2012

1/2015

9/2015

2019

5/2023

6/2023

=== European ===
2009

2014

2019

2024

== Parliament members ==
=== Current members ===
- Konstantinos Kontogeorgos (New Democracy)

=== Members (Jan 2015 - Sep 2015) ===
- Thomas Kotsias (SYRIZA)
