= Phocis (constituency) =

Parliamentary constituency of Greece

- Electoral constituency for the Hellenic Parliament
- Phocis within Greece
- Regional units: Phocis

Current constituency
- Number of members: 1

The Phocis electoral constituency (Greek: Εκλογική περιφέρεια Φωκίδας) is a parliamentary constituency of Greece. As a single-member district it elects one member to the Hellenic Parliament. Its current representative is Ioannis Bougas from New Democracy.

== Election Results ==
=== Parliamentary ===
2000

2004

2007

2009

5/2012

6/2012

1/2015

9/2015

2019

5/2023

6/2023

=== European ===
2009

2014

2019

2024

== See also ==
- List of parliamentary constituencies of Greece
