= Opinion polling for the June 2023 Greek parliamentary election =

In the run-up to the June 2023 Greek parliamentary election, various organizations carry out opinion polling to gauge voting intention in Greece. Results of such polls are displayed in this article. The date range for these opinion polls is from the previous parliamentary election, held on 21 May 2023, to the present day.

Polls are listed in reverse chronological order, showing the most recent first and using the dates when the survey fieldwork was done, as opposed to the date of publication. Where the fieldwork dates are unknown, the date of publication is given instead. The highest percentage figure in each polling survey is displayed with its background shaded in the leading party's colour. If a tie ensues, this is applied to the figures with the highest percentages. The "Lead" columns on the right shows the percentage point difference between the parties with the highest percentages in a given poll.

== Voting intention estimates ==
=== Graphical summary ===
Local regression trend line of poll results from 21 May 2023 to the present day, with each line corresponding to a political party and a 7-day average compared to the May Election.

=== Polling ===
The table below lists nationwide voting intention estimates. Refusals are generally excluded from the party vote percentages, while question wording and the treatment of "don't know" responses and those not intending to vote may vary between polling organisations. Polls that show their results without disregarding those respondents who were undecided or said they would abstain from voting (either physically or by voting blank) have been re-calculated by disregarding these numbers from the totals offered through a simple rule of three in order to obtain results comparable to other polls and the official election results. When available, seat projections are displayed below the percentages in a smaller font. 151 seats are required for an absolute majority in the Hellenic Parliament.

Color key:

Exit poll

Polling firm/Commissioner	Fieldwork date	Sample size	ND	SYRIZA	PASOK	KKE	EL	NIKI	PE	MeRA25	Sp.	Lead
June 2023 parliamentary election	25 June 2023	—	40.6; 158	17.8; 47	11.8; 32	7.7; 21	4.4; 12	3.7; 10	3.2; 8	2.5; 0	4.6; 12	22.8
Pulse–Alco–GPO–Marc–Metron–MRB	25 Jun 2023 (20:00)	?	39.0– 42.0; 156	16.3– 19.3; 47	11.2– 13.2; 33	6.5– 8.5; 20	3.6– 5.6; 12	2.7– 4.7; 10	2.1– 4.1; 8	1.4– 3.4; 0	3.6– 5.6; 12	22.7
Pulse–Alco–GPO–Marc–Metron–MRB	25 Jun 2023 (19:00)	?	40.0– 44.0; 158	16.1– 19.1; 45	10.0– 13.0; 29	7.2– 9.2; 21	2.3– 4.3; 9	2.3– 4.3; 9	2.0– 4.0; 8	2.0– 4.0; 8	4.0– 6.0; 13	23.9– 24.9
GPO/Parapolitika	22–23 Jun 2023	1,000	43.7; 163	18.2; 50	12.7; 36	7.5; 22	4.0; 11	3.0; 9	3.3; 9	2.5; 0	2.8; 0	25.5
Pulse RC/Skai	20–22 Jun 2023	1,021	40.6; 158	20.0; 53	11.9; 32	7.6; 19	3.8; 10	3.8; 10	3.8; 10	2.1; 0	3.1; 8	20.6
Marc/Ant1	20–22 Jun 2023	1,506	42.3; 165	19.3; 53	11.9; 32	7.4; 21	4.0; 10	3.3; 9	3.8; 10	2.3; 0	2.8; 0	23.0
MRB/Open	20–22 Jun 2023	1,000	40.5; 158	20.1; 53	11.7; 31	7.5; 20	3.8; 10	3.5; 9	3.9; 10	2.7; 0	3.4; 9	20.4
Real Polls/One Voice	20–21 Jun 2023	4,626	42.9	20.2	11.7	6.0	3.0	2.2	2.5	2.8	5.5	22.7
Palmos Analysis/tvxs.gr	19–22 Jun 2023	1,023	41.8	18.6	13.3	7.4	3.5	3.6	3.8	2.2	2.9	23.2
Rass/iefimerida.gr	19–22 Jun 2023	1,005	43.0	17.1	13.8	8.1	3.8	2.9	4.1	2.7	2.5	25.9
GPO/Star	18–22 Jun 2023	?	43.9; 162	19.6; 55	11.8; 33	7.5; 20	4.1; 12	3.0; 9	3.3; 9	2.5; 0	2.7; 0	24.3
Pulse RC/Skai	18–20 Jun 2023	1,016	40.5; 162	20.0; 56	11.9; 33	7.0; 19	3.8; 10	3.8; 10	3.8; 10	2.1; 0	2.7; 0	20.5
Alco/Alpha	16–21 Jun 2023	1,403	42.3	19.7	11.1	7.2	3.7	3.0	3.6	2.1	2.2	22.6
Interview/Politic.gr	16–19 Jun 2023	2,005	42.1; 165	21.4; 60	10.0; 34	6.4; 19	4.6; 13	2.1; 0	3.6; 9	2.7; 0	–	20.7
Metron Analysis/Mega	15–21 Jun 2023	1,302	40.0; 161	20.7; 57	11.7; 32	7.4; 20	3.1; 9	3.6; 10	3.8; 11	2.9; 0	2.8; 0	19.3
MRB/Newsbomb	15–19 Jun 2023	1,000	41.0; 162	20.0; 55	11.5; 32	7.0; 19	4.0; 11	3.4; 9	4.4; 12	2.7; 0	2.5; 0	21.0
Rass/Action24	13–16 Jun 2023	1,110	42.9; 166	17.9; 49	12.3; 33	8.1; 22	4.1; 11	3.0; 8	4.0; 11	2.8; 0	2.4; 0	25.0
Metron Analysis/To Vima	9–16 Jun 2023	1,200	40.6; 161	19.6; 53	11.5; 31	6.8; 18	4.7; 13	3.9; 11	4.7; 13	2.5; 0	1.6; 0	21.0
Marc/Proto Thema	12–15 Jun 2023	1,853	42.7; 165	20.1; 55	11.6; 31	7.2; 19	3.4; 10	3.3; 9	4.1; 11	2.5; 0	2.4; 0	22.6
GPO/Parapolitika	12–14 Jun 2023	1,000	44.5; 164	18.9; 53	12.4; 35	6.9; 19	3.7; 10	3.1; 9	3.7; 10	2.7; 0	2.2; 0	25.6
Opinion Poll/The TOC	12–14 Jun 2023	1,001	41.4; 163	20.2; 55	11.0; 30	7.5; 20	4.1; 12	3.3; 9	3.9; 11	2.8; 0	1.5; 0	21.2
Pulse RC/Skai	8–12 Jun 2023	1,308	42.0; 163	19.5; 52	12.0; 32	7.0; 19	4.0; 11	4.0; 11	4.5; 12	1.8; 0	1.8; 0	22.5
Marc/ANT1	7–11 Jun 2023	1,501	42.0; 161	19.8; 54	11.2; 31	7.3; 20	4.0; 11	3.3; 9	5.2; 14	2.1; 0	1.5; 0	22.2
Metron Analysis/Mega	7–10 Jun 2023	1,200	40.3; 157	19.2; 51	11.1; 29	6.7; 18	5.0; 13	3.3; 9	5.5; 14	3.3; 9	–	21.1
Alco/Alpha	6–10 Jun 2023	1,200	43.1	19.7	11.5	6.6	3.6	3.8	4.7	1.8	–	23.4
GPO/Ta Nea	6–8 Jun 2023	1,000	43.9; 160	20.9; 57	12.2; 33	6.9; 20	3.2; 8	3.6; 10	4.7; 13	2.2; 0	–	23.0
MRB/Open	6–7 Jun 2023	1,000	41.2; 161	20.0; 54	11.4; 30	7.0; 19	4.4; 12	4.1; 11	4.8; 13	2.4; 0	–	21.2
GPO/Parapolitika	30–31 May 2023	1,000	43.9	22.1	12.2	6.7	3.9	3.3	4.6	1.7	–	21.8
Marc/Proto Thema	23–31 May 2023	3,008	42.2	20.9	11.4	7.4	4.1	3.8	4.7	2.4	–	21.3
Metron Analysis/Mega	25–30 May 2023	1,202	41.0; 162	19.1; 51	11.7; 32	7.6; 20	4.4; 12	3.8; 10	4.8; 13	2.5; 0	–	21.9
Kapa Research	22–23 May 2023	1,002	41.3	19.5	14.4	7.2	4.6	3.5	3.9	2.0	–	21.8
May 2023 parliamentary election	21 May 2023	—	40.8; 146	20.1; 71	11.5; 41	7.2; 26	4.5; 16	2.9; 0	2.9; 0	2.6; 0	–	20.7
