= Opinion polling for the May 2023 Greek parliamentary election =

In the run-up to the May 2023 Greek parliamentary election, various organizations carry out opinion polling to gauge voting intention in Greece during the term of the 18th Hellenic Parliament. Results of such polls are displayed in this article. The date range for these opinion polls is from the previous parliamentary election, held on 7 July 2019, to the day the next election was held, on 21 May 2023.

Polls are listed in reverse chronological order, showing the most recent first and using the dates when the survey fieldwork was done, as opposed to the date of publication. Where the fieldwork dates are unknown, the date of publication is given instead. The highest percentage figure in each polling survey is displayed with its background shaded in the leading party's colour. If a tie ensues, this is applied to the figures with the highest percentages. The "Lead" columns on the right shows the percentage point difference between the parties with the highest percentages in a given poll.

== Voting intention estimates ==
=== Graphical summary ===
Local regression trend line of poll results from 7 July 2019 to the present day, with each line corresponding to a political party.

=== Polling ===
The table below lists nationwide voting intention estimates. Refusals are generally excluded from the party vote percentages, while question wording and the treatment of "don't know" responses and those not intending to vote may vary between polling organisations. Polls that show their results without disregarding those respondents who were undecided or said they would abstain from voting (either physically or by voting blank) have been re-calculated by disregarding these numbers from the totals offered through a simple rule of three in order to obtain results comparable to other polls and the official election results. When available, seat projections are displayed below the percentages in a smaller font. 151 seats are required for an absolute majority in the Hellenic Parliament.

Color key:

Exit poll

Polling firm/Commissioner	Fieldwork date	Sample size	ND	SYRIZA	PASOK	KKE	EL	MeRA25	XA	PE	EKE	ED	NIKI	Lead
May 2023 parliamentary election	21 May 2023	—	40.8; 146	20.1; 71	11.5; 41	7.2; 26	4.5; 16	2.6; 0	–	2.9; 0	–	0.8; 0	2.9; 0	20.7
Kapa Research	21 May 2023 (20:00)	?	40.0– 43.0	21.0– 24.0	11.5– 13.5	7.0– 8.0	3.0– 4.5	2.5– 3.5	–	2.5– 3.5	–	0.7– 1.7	1.5– 2.5	19.0
Pulse–Alco–GPO–Marc–Metron–MRB	21 May 2023 (20:00)	?	37.5– 41.5	23.5– 27.5	11.5– 12.5	6.5– 7.5	4.3– 5.3	2.5– 3.5	–	2.5– 3.5	–	–	2.5– 3.5	14.0
Kapa Research	21 May 2023 (19:00)	?	37.5– 40.5; 123/128	25.5– 28.5; 85/88	10.0– 12.0; 35/36	6.0– 8.0; 22/23	3.5– 5.0; 14	3.0– 4.0; 11	–	2.5– 3.5; 0/10	–	0.7– 1.7; 0	–	12.0
Pulse–Alco–GPO–Marc–Metron–MRB	21 May 2023 (19:00)	?	36.0– 40.0; 121/125	25.0– 29.0; 86/89	9.5– 12.5; 35/36	6.0– 8.0; 22/23	3.5– 5.5; 15	2.5– 4.5; 11/12	–	2.2– 4.2; 0/10	–	–	–	11.0
Pulse RC/Skai	14–19 May 2023	1,425	36.0; 119	29.5; 98	10.0; 33	6.5; 22	4.0; 13	4.5; 15	–	1.5; 0	–	1.5; 0	2.0; 0	6.5
GPO/Star	18 May 2023	?	36.0	30.5	10.0	7.3	4.0	4.0	–	1.4	–	1.3	1.1	5.5
Marc/AΝΤ1	16–18 May 2023	1,266	36.0	29.6	9.0	6.5	3.8	3.8	–	2.6	–	1.1	2.3	6.4
Metron Analysis/Mega	12–17 May 2023	1,500	36.5; 120	28.5; 94	10.5; 35	7.0; 23	4.5; 15	4.0; 13	–	1.7; 0	–	–	1.4; 0	8.0
Interview/Politic.gr	12–17 May 2023	2,405	37.9; 125	30.7; 99	9.9; 30	6.1; 19	3.9; 11	4.4; 16	–	–	–	2.2; 0	2.1; 0	7.2
Marc/Proto Thema	10–13 May 2023	1,212	36.5; 121	29.5; 98	10.3; 34	6.8; 23	3.7; 12	3.7; 12	–	1.9; 0	–	–	1.6; 0	7.0
ProRata/Efimerida ton Sintakton	8–11 May 2023	1,000	35.0; 115	30.0; 99	10.5; 35	7.5; 25	3.5; 12	4.0; 14	–	–	–	–	–	5.0
Metron Analysis/Mega	4–11 May 2023	2,105	36.2; 121	28.0; 94	10.3; 34	7.4; 25	3.3; 11	4.4; 15	–	2.5; 0	–	1.3; 0	1.3; 0	8.2
Kapa Research/iEfimerida	5–9 May 2023	1,202	36.6	29.9	9.8	7.6	4.4	4.1	–	1.1	–	1.5	1.1	6.7
Marc/ANT1	5–9 May 2023	1,286	37.1	30.1	10.3	6.9	3.7	3.8	–	1.8	–	1.4	1.7	7.0
Pulse RC/Skai	4–7 May 2023	1,000	35.0– 36.5; 118/120	28.5– 29.5; 96/97	10.5; 34/35	7.0; 23/24	3.5; 11/12	4.5; 15	–	1.0; 0	–	1.0; 0	1.0; 0	6.5– 7.0
Alco/Alpha	3–6 May 2023	1,000	36.8	29.3	10.3	7.2	4.2	3.6	–	1.5	–	1.1	–	7.6
GPO/Ta Nea	2–3 May 2023	1,000	36.9; 121	30.4; 100	10.1; 33	7.0; 23	3.5; 11	3.6; 12	–	–	–	1.7; 0	–	6.5
Metron Analysis/Mega	25 Apr–2 May 2023	1,305	35.4; 121	27.7; 94	10.7; 36	6.6; 23	3.2; 11	4.5; 15	–	1.5; 0	–	–	1.0; 0	7.7
ProRata/Attica	27–30 Apr 2023	1,147	35.0	30.5	10.5	6.5	3.5	4.0	–	–	4.0	–	–	4.5
Interview/Politic.gr	27–30 Apr 2023	1,705	35.6	28.6	10.8	6.9	4.2	4.4	–	–	3.3	2.1	–	7.0
Rass/iefimerida	24–27 Apr 2023	1,030	34.4	27.6	12.0	8.3	4.1	4.3	–	–	4.4	–	–	6.8
MRB/Open	24–26 Apr 2023	1,000	34.1; 113/120	28.6; 95/100	9.5; 32/33	6.3; 21/22	3.4; 12	3.7; 12/13	–	1.3; 0	4.6; 0/15	1.1; 0	–	5.5
Pulse RC/Skai	19–23 Apr 2023	1,051	33.5– 35.5; 108/116	28.0– 28.5; 90/95	10.5– 11.0; 34/36	7.0; 22/24	4.5; 14/15	5.0– 5.5; 16/18	–	–	3.5– 4.5; 0/15	–	–	5.5– 7.0
Opinion Poll/The TOC	18–21 Apr 2023	1,003	36.4	29.5	11.2	5.9	4.8	3.7	–	1.1	3.6	1.1	–	6.9
Metron Analysis/To Vima	19–20 Apr 2023	1,007	33.8	26.9	10.3	7.3	4.9	5.4	–	–	4.2	–	–	6.9
GPO/Parapolitika	3–5 Apr 2023	1,000	35.6	30.2	10.8	7.1	4.1	3.6	–	–	3.1	1.4	–	5.4
Pulse RC/Skai	30 Mar–3 Apr 2023	1,107	35.0; 110/115	29.5; 93/97	11.5; 36/37	6.5; 20/21	4.5; 14/15	4.5; 14/15	–	–	4.0; 0/13	–	–	5.5
Interview/Politic.gr	28 Mar–1 Apr 2023	1,415	35.0	29.4	10.3	7.5	4.5	4.5	–	–	2.2	1.9	–	5.6
Rass/Action 24	27–31 Mar 2023	1,001	32.9	26.9	13.3	7.9	5.6	5.1	–	–	4.1	–	–	6.0
Marc/Proto Thema	27–30 Mar 2023	1,213	35.1	29.2	10.7	6.5	4.4	4.8	–	–	4.2	1.1	–	5.9
Palmos Analysis/Tvxs	27–30 Mar 2023	1,083	31.0	26.0	11.0	7.0	5.0	5.0	–	–	5.0	2.0	–	5.0
ProRata/Efimerida ton Sintakton	24–28 Mar 2023	1,085	34.0	30.5	10.5	6.5	4.0	3.5	–	–	3.5	–	–	3.5
MRB/Open	24–28 Mar 2023	1,000	33.3	29.4	9.5	6.1	5.5	4.5	–	–	4.8	–	–	3.9
Metron Analysis/Mega	22–28 Mar 2023	1,306	32.5; 105	26.7; 86	11.7; 38	7.1; 23	5.2; 17	4.7; 15	–	–	4.9; 16	–	–	5.8
GPO/Star	18–21 Mar 2023	1,200	35.6	30.7	10.8	7.7	4.0	3.7	–	–	2.4	1.2	–	4.9
Alco/Alpha	13–17 Mar 2023	1,001	32.9	28.8	10.8	7.0	4.4	3.9	–	–	3.9	1.3	–	4.1
Pulse RC/Skai	13–15 Mar 2023	1,125	34.5	30.0	11.5	7.0	4.5	4.0	–	–	3.5	1.0	–	4.5
Μetron Analysis/Mega	7–13 Mar 2023	1,201	33.7	26.3	11.8	7.5	5.2	4.5	–	–	4.6	–	–	7.4
MRB/Open	6–13 Mar 2023	1,450	33.2	29.7	10.9	6.2	5.4	4.7	1.2	–	4.8	–	–	3.5
ProRata/Attica	8–11 Mar 2023	1,102	34.0	31.0	11.5	6.0	4.0	3.5	–	–	3.0	–	–	3.0
Interview/Politic.gr	6–9 Mar 2023	1,000	33.7	29.4	10.8	6.6	5.1	4.2	–	–	1.9	1.8	–	4.3
GPO/Parapolitika	6–8 Mar 2023	1,000	35.2	30.6	11.0	8.0	3.6	3.9	–	–	1.7	1.7	–	4.6
Marc/ANT1	4–7 Mar 2023	1,241	34.7	29.3	11.4	6.6	4.6	4.1	–	–	3.5	1.5	–	5.4
Interview/Politic.gr	16–20 Feb 2023	1,505	36.6	29.2	11.0	5.5	4.9	3.8	–	–	1.7	1.8	–	7.4
Opinion Poll/The TOC	14–17 Feb 2023	1,004	38.5	29.6	11.5	5.2	4.6	2.7	–	–	3.0	1.3	–	8.9
Alco/Alpha	13–17 Feb 2023	1,001	36.6	28.7	11.2	6.7	4.2	3.1	–	–	2.9	1.4	–	7.9
Marc/Proto Thema	6–10 Feb 2023	1,130	37.5	29.0	11.4	6.1	4.2	3.1	–	–	3.9	1.4	–	8.5
GPO/Parapolitika	7–9 Feb 2023	1,000	38.3	29.9	11.1	7.2	3.4	2.7	–	–	–	–	–	8.4
Marc/ANT1	24–31 Jan 2023	1,585	37.5	28.9	11.2	6.1	4.5	3.2	–	–	3.9	1.1	–	8.6
MRB/Open	23–24 Jan 2023	1,000	36.0	28.9	12.5	5.9	5.3	3.4	–	–	3.0	1.2	–	7.1
GPO/Star	20–24 Jan 2023	1,200	38.1	30.0	11.0	7.2	3.9	2.5	–	–	2.1	1.4	–	8.1
ProRata/Attica	19–23 Jan 2023	1,018	36.5	31.0	10.5	5.5	4.0	3.5	–	–	2.5	–	–	5.5
Pulse RC/Skai	19–23 Jan 2023	1,205	37.0	29.0	12.0	6.5	4.5	3.0	1.0	–	3.0	1.0	–	8.0
Rass/Action 24	16–20 Jan 2023	1,003	34.7	27.8	15.7	6.9	3.7	3.5	–	–	3.4	–	–	6.9
Metron Analysis/Mega	11–17 Jan 2023	1,309	36.4	27.5	12.4	6.0	4.5	3.5	–	–	3.5	1.2	–	8.9
Interview/Politic.gr	12–16 Jan 2023	1,675	36.0	28.4	11.2	6.7	5.0	3.9	–	–	1.7	1.7	–	7.6
Opinion Poll/The TOC	11–13 Jan 2023	1,005	38.6	29.3	11.9	5.3	4.7	3.2	–	–	2.7	1.4	–	9.3
Alco/Alpha	9–13 Jan 2023	1,002	35.8	27.9	12.4	6.4	5.2	3.7	–	–	3.0	–	–	7.9
Μarc/Proto Thema	16–21 Dec 2022	1,003	37.0	28.0	11.6	6.4	4.6	3.4	–	–	3.1	1.4	–	9.0
Pulse RC/Skai	18–19 Dec 2022	1,103	37.5	28.5	11.5	5.5	4.5	3.5	–	–	3.0	1.0	–	9.0
Interview/Politic.gr	15–19 Dec 2022	1,655	36.7	27.1	11.3	5.6	5.3	3.4	–	–	1.7	1.8	–	9.6
GPO/Powergame.gr	13–15 Dec 2022	1,000	36.8	29.5	11.5	7.2	4.5	2.7	–	–	2.1	1.6	–	7.3
MRB/Open	1–9 Dec 2022	2,000	33.5	27.2	13.3	6.0	5.3	3.4	–	–	3.2	1.2	–	6.3
Opinion Poll/Lykavitos	29 Nov–2 Dec 2022	1,251	38.1	28.7	13.3	5.3	4.6	2.7	–	–	2.9	1.2	–	9.4
Rass/Action 24	28 Nov–2 Dec 2022	1,002	35.5	26.7	15.7	7.0	4.3	3.7	–	–	2.4	–	–	8.8
GPO/Star	24–28 Nov 2022	1,200	37.3	29.5	12.7	6.6	3.9	2.5	–	–	2.1	1.4	–	7.8
Μarc/ANT1	22–27 Nov 2022	1,030	36.8	27.6	13.0	6.4	4.7	3.5	–	–	2.6	1.2	–	9.2
ProRata/Efimerida ton Sintakton	19–22 Nov 2022	1,905	36.0	30.0	12.5	5.5	5.0	3.0	–	–	2.0	–	–	6.0
Pulse RC/Skai	19–22 Nov 2022	1,205	36.5	28.5	12.5	6.0	4.5	3.5	–	–	3.0	1.0	–	8.0
Metron Analysis/Mega	16–22 Nov 2022	1,000	36.5	26.3	14.2	6.0	4.3	4.5	–	–	2.3	–	–	10.2
Interview/Politic.gr	17–21 Nov 2022	1,605	35.7	28.0	11.3	6.7	5.3	3.9	–	–	1.4	1.7	–	7.7
Alco/Alpha TV	14–18 Nov 2022	1,000	35.3	26.8	13.3	6.1	5.7	3.1	–	–	2.4	–	–	8.5
GPO/Parapolitika	8–10 Nov 2022	1,000	36.6	29.9	12.2	6.8	4.2	2.7	–	–	2.0	1.7	–	6.7
MRB/Open	31 Oct–2 Nov 2022	1,000	35.5	28.0	14.0	6.1	5.5	3.7	–	–	3.2	1.5	–	7.5
Pulse RC/Skai	23–25 Oct 2022	1,207	37.0	28.5	12.5	6.0	4.5	3.0	1.0	–	2.0	1.5	–	8.5
Μarc/ANT1	18–22 Oct 2022	1,050	37.4	27.3	12.9	6.0	5.1	3.6	–	–	2.5	1.4	–	10.1
Interview/Politic.gr	13–19 Oct 2022	1,575	35.6	27.6	12.0	7.1	5.5	3.3	–	–	1.8	1.3	–	8.0
GPO/Powergame.gr	12–15 Oct 2022	1,200	37.6	29.4	11.8	6.3	4.4	3.0	–	–	1.8	–	–	8.2
Alco/Alpha TV	10–14 Oct 2022	1,002	35.5	26.1	13.0	6.4	5.8	3.6	–	–	2.3	–	–	9.4
MRB/Open	10–12 Oct 2022	1,000	35.6	27.4	13.5	5.9	5.2	3.7	–	–	2.9	1.3	–	8.2
Interview/Politic.gr	22–27 Sep 2022	1,455	35.3	26.2	11.6	6.7	5.6	3.9	–	–	1.3	1.9	–	9.1
Metron Analysis/Mega	22–26 Sep 2022	1,300	35.8	25.4	15.0	6.3	5.9	4.1	–	–	2.5	1.3	–	10.4
Marc/ANT1	20–24 Sep 2022	1,166	37.6	27.6	13.1	6.2	4.7	3.2	–	–	2.3	1.1	–	10.0
Palmos Analysis/The Caller	20–23 Sep 2022	1,027	36.5	25.4	14.1	7.0	5.0	4.8	–	–	2.5	–	–	11.1
Alco/Alpha TV	19–23 Sep 2022	1,001	35.8	26.8	13.6	6.3	4.9	3.6	–	–	2.5	–	–	9.0
GPO/Star	19–21 Sep 2022	1,200	37.4	29.1	12.5	6.1	4.3	2.5	–	–	1.9	1.7	–	8.3
MRB/Open	19–21 Sep 2022	1,000	35.7	27.2	13.4	6.1	5.0	4.2	–	–	2.6	1.3	–	8.5
Pulse RC/Skai	18–20 Sep 2022	1,012	37.5	29.0	13.0	5.5	4.5	3.5	–	–	2.0	1.0	–	8.5
Pulse RC/Skai	12–15 Sep 2022	1,105	38.0	28.5	12.5	6.0	4.5	2.5	–	–	2.0	1.0	–	9.5
GPO/Parapolitika	12–14 Sep 2022	1,000	37.2	28.3	13.0	6.4	4.6	2.4	–	–	1.9	1.7	–	8.9
Opinion Poll/Mononews.gr	12–14 Sep 2022	1,004	38.3	27.5	14.1	5.9	5.8	2.7	–	–	2.3	–	–	10.8
Pulse RC/Skai	8–9 Sep 2022	1,006	36.5	28.5	13.5	6.0	4.0	3.0	1.0	–	2.0	1.0	–	8.0
ProRata/Efimerida ton Sintakton	2–5 Sep 2022	1,010	35.5	30.0	13.0	6.0	4.0	3.0	–	–	2.5	–	–	5.5
MRB/Star	31 Aug–5 Sep 2022	1,000	34.5	26.7	14.6	6.1	5.4	4.9	–	–	2.4	–	–	7.8
Metron Analysis/Mega	25–31 Aug 2022	1,003	34.1	24.9	15.7	7.5	4.2	4.9	–	–	2.0	2.0	–	9.2
Interview/Politic.gr	23–29 Aug 2022	1,569	35.8	26.7	12.8	5.7	6.0	3.9	–	–	1.3	2.0	–	9.1
Marc/Proto Thema	22–25 Aug 2022	1,001	36.4	26.7	14.0	6.1	5.7	3.4	–	–	2.0	1.1	–	9.7
GPO/Ta Nea	22–24 Aug 2022	1,200	35.8	28.7	13.8	6.5	5.5	2.4	–	–	1.8	1.4	–	7.1
ProRata/Efimerida ton Sintakton	21–24 Jul 2022	1,300	35.5	29.5	13.0	6.5	4.0	3.0	–	–	2.5	–	–	6.0
Marc/Proto Thema	16–20 Jul 2022	1,009	37.1	26.6	13.7	6.3	5.6	3.2	–	–	2.1	1.1	–	10.5
Opinion Poll/To Manifesto	12–15 Jul 2022	1,015	36.9	26.5	13.7	5.9	5.6	2.9	–	–	2.6	1.2	–	10.6
Pulse RC/Skai	11–13 Jul 2022	1,351	37.0	28.5	15.0	6.0	4.5	3.5	–	–	2.0	1.0	–	8.5
Interview/Ρolitic.gr	4–6 Jul 2022	1,305	36.0	26.8	13.6	5.5	5.6	3.4	–	–	1.4	1.7	–	9.2
Alco/Open	27 Jun–4 Jul 2022	1,400	35.2	25.3	14.4	6.1	5.8	3.5	–	–	2.0	1.3	–	9.9
GPO/Powergame.gr	28 Jun–1 Jul 2022	1,200	37.8	27.6	12.7	6.6	5.3	2.6	–	–	2.2	–	–	10.2
MRB/Star	22–30 Jun 2022	1,000	34.1	25.7	14.2	5.5	5.2	3.6	–	–	2.2	1.4	–	8.4
Marc/ANT1	22–25 Jun 2022	1,059	37.1	25.7	14.6	6.2	5.3	3.3	–	–	2.4	1.6	–	11.4
Pulse RC/Skai	6–8 Jun 2022	1,206	36.0	27.0	15.0	6.0	5.0	3.0	–	–	2.0	–	–	9.0
ProRata/Efimerida ton Sintakton	30 May–1 Jun 2022	1,070	36.0	29.0	14.5	6.0	4.0	2.5	–	–	1.5	–	–	7.0
Kapa Research/iEfimerida	27 May–1 Jun 2022	1,004	37.6	28.1	14.1	7.2	4.7	3.3	–	–	1.4	–	–	9.5
Interview/Politic.gr	24–31 May 2022	1,485	35.3	24.5	14.5	6.4	5.9	3.3	–	–	1.6	1.8	–	10.8
Alco/Open	23–28 May 2022	1,000	35.5	25.8	14.5	6.1	5.3	4.0	–	–	2.5	–	–	9.7
Metron Analysis/Mega	16–23 May 2022	1,300	36.1	25.7	15.0	6.3	5.2	3.7	–	–	2.8	1.3	–	10.4
Marc/ANT1	18–22 May 2022	1,037	37.0	25.5	15.3	6.6	5.3	3.2	–	–	2.3	1.3	–	11.5
GPO/Ta Nea	16–18 May 2022	1,000	37.6	27.2	13.8	6.3	5.2	2.7	–	–	2.1	1.4	–	10.4
MRB/Star	16–18 May 2022	1,004	35.0	26.1	14.2	5.8	5.5	3.6	–	–	2.8	1.6	–	8.9
Opinion Poll/To Manifesto	11–13 May 2022	1,001	36.7	25.6	14.9	5.5	6.3	3.0	–	1.7	1.7	–	–	11.1
Pulse RC/Skai	9–11 May 2022	1,206	35.0	26.0	15.5	6.0	5.0	3.0	–	–	2.0	1.0	–	9.0
Marc/Proto Thema	7–11 May 2022	1,014	36.9	25.3	15.5	6.3	5.1	3.5	–	–	2.4	1.0	–	11.6
Interview/Politic.gr	4–9 May 2022	1,485	34.9	25.0	14.1	6.0	6.2	3.8	–	–	1.8	2.1	–	9.1
RealPolls/Dimokratia	6–8 May 2022	1,000	34.8	28.6	12.1	6.1	4.2	3.2	1.1	0.8	2.9	1.3	–	6.2
GPO/Powergame.gr	4–7 May 2022	1,200	36.1	26.7	14.8	6.9	5.4	2.8	–	–	2.2	–	–	9.4
Alco/Open	26–30 Apr 2022	1,000	35.6	26.2	15.1	7.0	5.7	3.5	–	1.2	2.1	–	–	9.4
Data Consultants/Peloponnese	28 Mar–15 Apr 2022	1,026	36.0	28.9	15.0	6.0	4.6	2.0	–	–	1.3	–	–	7.1
ProRata/Efimerida ton Sintakton	8–11 Apr 2022	1,236	35.5	29.0	14.0	6.0	4.0	2.5	–	–	2.5	–	–	6.5
Interview/Politic.gr	30 Mar–5 Apr 2022	1,410	34.2	24.3	16.1	7.2	5.6	3.4	–	–	1.6	1.9	–	9.9
RealPolls/Dimokratia	30 Mar–2 Apr 2022	2,096	34.4	29.0	12.1	5.5	4.2	2.4	–	–	–	–	–	5.4
Opinion Poll/Mononews.gr	30 Mar–1 Apr 2022	1,001	36.8	25.9	15.4	5.1	5.7	3.5	–	–	2.7	–	–	10.9
Pulse RC/Skai	27–29 Mar 2022	1,207	35.0	25.5	15.5	6.5	5.0	3.5	–	–	2.0	1.0	–	9.5
Alco/Open	21–26 Mar 2022	1,000	36.2	25.9	15.2	6.8	5.2	3.3	–	1.3	2.1	–	–	10.3
MRB/Star	18–26 Mar 2022	1,000	34.9	25.9	16.4	5.5	6.0	3.8	–	–	2.6	–	–	9.0
Metron Analysis/Mega	16–21 Mar 2022	1,304	34.1	24.6	16.7	6.3	5.9	4.4	–	–	2.9	–	–	9.5
Marc/ANT1	16–21 Mar 2022	1,070	35.6	24.9	16.2	6.4	5.4	3.4	–	–	2.5	–	–	10.7
ProRata/Efimerida ton Sintakton	11–14 Mar 2022	1,000	36.5	28.5	15.0	6.0	4.0	2.5	–	–	–	–	–	8.0
GPO/Powergame.gr	9–11 Mar 2022	1,000	37.6	26.3	16.3	6.5	4.9	2.7	–	–	2.0	–	–	11.3
Marc/Proto Thema	8–10 Mar 2022	1,026	37.3	24.3	16.6	6.7	5.4	2.8	–	–	2.2	–	–	13.0
Abacus/Alpha TV	2–8 Mar 2022	1,026	33.0– 36.0	22.0– 25.0	15.0– 18.0	5.0– 6.5	4.0– 5.0	2.5– 3.0	–	–	2.5– 3.0	–	–	11.0
Interview/Ρolitic.gr	2–6 Mar 2022	1,405	36.5	23.4	17.4	5.6	5.3	3.5	–	–	–	2.2	–	13.1
Pulse RC/Skai	25–28 Feb 2022	1,205	36.5	25.5	16.0	5.5	4.5	3.5	–	–	2.0	1.0	–	11.0
RealPolls/Dimokratia	16–20 Feb 2022	2,089	36.4	28.2	13.3	5.5	3.0	3.8	1.0	0.4	–	1.3	–	8.2
Alco/Open	14–18 Feb 2022	1,000	37.3	26.1	16.5	6.1	4.2	3.5	–	1.3	2.5	–	–	10.2
Αbout People/Eteron	13–17 Feb 2022	2,100	36.0	23.3	16.6	7.5	3.6	4.3	–	–	–	–	–	12.7
Interview/Ρolitic.gr	10–14 Feb 2022	1,406	36.8	24.3	16.3	5.7	5.6	3.3	–	–	–	2.2	–	12.5
Marc/ANT1	8–12 Feb 2022	1,037	37.3	24.9	17.3	6.2	5.4	3.0	–	–	2.0	–	–	12.4
Opinion Poll/To Manifesto	7–12 Feb 2022	1,251	38.5	24.1	17.5	5.8	5.0	3.2	–	–	–	–	–	14.4
GPO/Powergame.gr	31 Jan–3 Feb 2022	1,000	36.2	25.5	16.7	7.2	4.5	3.5	–	–	2.0	1.2	–	10.7
ProRata/Efimerida ton Sintakton	28–31 Jan 2022	1,000	37.0	29.0	15.0	6.0	4.0	2.5	–	–	–	–	–	8.0
Pulse RC/Skai	26–29 Jan 2022	1,308	35.5	24.5	16.0	6.0	5.0	3.5	–	–	1.5	1.0	–	11.0
Abacus/Alpha TV	19–23 Jan 2022	1,012	36.0– 39.0	20.0– 23.0	18.0– 21.0	6.5– 7.5	2.0– 2.5	2.0– 2.5	–	–	–	–	–	16.0
Marc/ANT1	18–22 Jan 2022	1,002	37.8	24.3	16.8	5.5	5.0	3.1	–	–	1.9	–	–	13.5
Metron Analysis/Mega	12–18 Jan 2022	1,306	36.0	24.2	18.5	5.4	5.0	4.1	–	–	1.9	1.5	–	11.8
ProRata/iEidiseis	14–16 Jan 2022	1,000	37.5	29.5	14.0	5.0	4.0	2.5	–	–	–	–	–	8.0
Interview/Politic.gr	10–12 Jan 2022	1,414	37.9	25.5	14.0	5.3	5.1	3.7	–	–	–	1.7	–	12.4
Alco/Open	13–18 Dec 2021	1,000	37.4	24.2	15.6	6.2	4.1	4.0	2.4	1.3	1.1	–	–	13.1
GPO/Powergame.gr	13–17 Dec 2021	1,000	38.0	25.4	15.5	6.5	4.5	3.4	–	–	–	1.2	–	12.6
Marc/Proto Thema	13–16 Dec 2021	1,010	38.5	22.4	17.7	6.2	5.4	2.5	–	–	1.5	–	–	16.1
ProRata/Efimerida ton Sintakton	14–15 Dec 2021	1,885	38.0	28.5	12.5	5.0	4.0	2.5	–	–	–	–	–	9.5
Interview/Vergina TV	13–15 Dec 2021	1,365	38.1	26.8	13.9	5.0	5.5	3.6	–	–	–	1.2	–	11.3
MRB/Star	13–14 Dec 2021	1,000	37.9	24.4	16.7	5.1	4.7	3.3	–	–	1.9	1.3	–	13.5
Kapa Research/iEfimerida	13–14 Dec 2021	1,003	39.3	27.3	13.5	7.0	4.3	3.5	–	–	–	–	–	12.0
MRB/Star	1–10 Dec 2021	1,500	38.2	25.9	12.8	5.6	4.8	3.7	–	–	2.3	–	–	12.3
GPO/Parapolitika	22–25 Nov 2021	1,000	40.4	27.8	11.1	6.4	4.1	3.5	–	–	1.8	–	–	12.6
Pulse RC/Skai	20–25 Nov 2021	4,012	38.5	26.5	11.0	6.0	4.5	3.5	–	–	1.5	–	–	12.0
Metron Analysis/Mega	16–23 Nov 2021	1,503	40.0	24.8	12.8	6.5	5.6	4.4	–	–	1.6	–	–	15.2
Alco/Open	15–20 Nov 2021	1,000	38.2	27.1	11.1	6.4	4.9	3.6	1.9	1.8	1.9	–	–	11.1
Marc/Proto Thema	14–18 Nov 2021	1,003	41.3	26.7	11.1	6.9	5.5	3.8	–	–	1.4	–	–	14.6
MRB/Star	12–17 Nov 2021	3,281	38.2	26.6	11.0	6.0	5.1	4.4	1.2	–	2.4	1.2	–	11.6
Marc/ANT1	8–13 Nov 2021	1,508	42.1	26.6	10.2	7.2	5.3	3.6	–	–	–	–	–	15.5
Metron Analysis/To Vima	1–9 Nov 2021	2,511	36.9	24.1	12.9	6.7	5.7	5.3	1.6	–	1.8	–	–	12.8
Interview/Politic.gr	3–8 Nov 2021	1,734	40.0	26.3	10.3	6.1	5.9	3.4	–	–	–	–	–	12.6
GPO/Powergame.gr	27–29 Oct 2021	1,000	41.6	28.7	8.3	6.8	4.1	3.4	–	–	2.1	1.3	–	12.9
Pulse RC/Skai	22–25 Oct 2021	1,907	40.0	27.0	9.5	6.0	4.5	3.5	–	–	1.5	–	–	13.0
Opinion Poll/Mononews.gr	13–19 Oct 2021	1,005	43.7	27.3	7.5	6.5	5.0	2.8	–	1.5	1.6	–	–	16.4
Alco/Open	11–16 Oct 2021	1,000	39.7	28.3	7.3	6.0	5.0	4.7	–	1.8	1.5	–	–	11.4
Interview/Political	11–14 Oct 2021	1,115	40.1	25.3	7.9	6.2	5.4	4.4	–	–	–	–	–	14.8
ProRata/Efimerida ton Sintakton	8–12 Oct 2021	1,131	40.5	31.0	8.0	5.5	3.5	2.5	–	–	–	–	–	9.5
Marc/ANT1	6–11 Oct 2021	1,007	41.0	27.5	8.0	6.5	5.5	3.5	–	–	–	–	–	13.5
Interview/Politic.gr	27–30 Sep 2021	1,105	39.9	27.2	8.0	5.6	4.8	4.4	–	–	–	–	–	12.7
Metron Analysis/Mega	21–27 Sep 2021	1,200	41.0	26.2	8.0	6.8	5.3	5.5	–	–	1.8	–	–	14.8
GPO/Powergame.gr	20–24 Sep 2021	1,000	41.3	29.3	7.0	7.3	4.0	3.4	–	–	1.9	1.5	–	12.0
Marc/Proto Thema	19–23 Sep 2021	1,029	42.2	28.2	7.4	6.7	5.5	3.5	–	–	–	–	–	14.0
MRB/Star	20–21 Sep 2021	1,000	40.6	28.6	8.1	5.9	4.6	4.2	1.2	1.3	2.1	–	–	12.0
Pulse RC/Skai	19–21 Sep 2021	2,018	40.0	27.5	7.5	6.5	5.0	3.5	–	–	1.5	–	–	12.5
Alco/Open	13–17 Sep 2021	1,000	39.2	27.4	8.1	6.5	5.3	3.5	1.4	1.8	–	–	–	11.8
GPO/Parapolitika	13–15 Sep 2021	1,000	41.3	29.1	7.5	6.8	4.2	3.5	–	–	1.3	1.8	–	12.2
MRB/Star	13–15 Sep 2021	1,000	41.4	28.4	8.4	6.4	4.4	3.6	–	–	–	–	–	13.0
Opinion Poll/Political	2–7 Sep 2021	1,002	44.6	26.9	7.9	7.0	4.5	4.1	–	–	–	–	–	17.7
Interview/Politic.gr	23–27 Aug 2021	1,325	39.7	25.4	7.0	6.0	5.1	4.3	–	–	–	–	–	14.3
GPO/Ta Nea	20–25 Aug 2021	1,000	40.2	28.4	7.5	7.0	4.8	3.5	–	–	1.7	2.3	–	11.8
ProRata/iEidiseis	23–24 Aug 2021	1,800	40.0	30.5	8.0	5.5	4.0	2.5	–	–	–	–	–	9.5
Alco/Open	12–17 Jul 2021	1,000	41.7	27.2	7.9	6.2	5.2	4.1	–	1.8	–	–	–	14.5
ProRata/Efimerida ton Sintakton	7–11 Jul 2021	1,735	41.5	29.5	8.5	5.0	3.5	3.0	–	–	–	–	–	12.0
GPO/Powergame.gr	7–10 Jul 2021	1,000	42.8	28.5	7.7	6.9	4.3	3.6	–	–	–	–	–	14.3
Pulse RC/Skai	5–7 Jul 2021	1,305	41.5	26.5	7.5	6.5	5.0	4.0	–	–	1.0	1.0	–	15.0
Opinion Poll/To Manifesto	30 Jun–7 Jul 2021	1,002	46.4	25.8	8.0	7.0	4.3	3.8	–	–	–	–	–	20.6
MRB/Star	23 Jun–1 Jul 2021	2,000	43.6	28.3	8.4	6.2	4.2	3.6	1.4	–	–	–	–	15.3
GPO/Ta Nea	26–29 Jun 2021	1,000	43.0	28.4	7.9	7.1	4.8	3.5	–	–	–	–	–	14.6
Marc/Proto Thema	18–24 Jun 2021	1,006	45.7	25.8	7.8	6.7	4.3	3.6	–	–	–	–	–	19.9
Interview/Vergina TV	17–23 Jun 2021	1,211	42.0	25.2	8.0	6.5	5.2	3.9	–	–	–	–	–	16.8
Alco/Open	15–19 Jun 2021	1,000	43.2	28.1	8.0	6.4	4.7	3.9	–	1.8	–	–	–	15.1
GPO/Powergame.gr	3–5 Jun 2021	1,000	42.6	27.8	8.2	7.2	4.1	4.1	–	–	–	–	–	14.8
Pulse RC/Skai	31 May–2 Jun 2021	1,304	42.5	27.0	7.5	6.0	4.5	4.0	–	–	1.0	–	–	15.5
Opinion Poll	18–28 May 2021	1,605	46.6	24.8	8.4	6.6	5.2	3.9	–	–	–	–	–	21.8
Metron Analysis/Mega	18–24 May 2021	1,000	43.1	25.5	7.6	6.7	5.1	6.0	–	–	1.8	–	–	17.6
Alco/Open	17–21 May 2021	1,000	43.3	27.9	7.9	6.0	4.7	3.4	–	1.3	–	–	–	15.4
Interview/Vergina TV	11–17 May 2021	1,405	42.0	24.4	8.1	6.4	5.8	4.2	–	–	–	–	–	17.6
GPO/Powergame.gr	5–7 May 2021	1,000	43.4	27.3	8.5	7.2	4.6	3.8	–	–	–	–	–	16.1
Marc/Proto Thema	22–27 Apr 2021	1,025	44.7	25.8	8.4	6.6	5.3	3.6	–	–	–	–	–	18.9
Pulse RC/Skai	23–25 Apr 2021	1,305	42.0	27.0	7.5	6.5	5.0	3.5	–	–	–	–	–	15.0
Opinion Poll/To Manifesto	19–23 Apr 2021	1,001	46.7	26.1	8.0	5.9	5.2	3.5	–	–	–	–	–	20.6
Interview/Politic.gr	19–22 Apr 2021	1,205	42.3	25.5	7.7	6.5	5.5	4.2	–	–	–	–	–	16.8
Interview/Vergina TV	13–19 Apr 2021	1,115	42.3	25.3	7.6	6.4	5.9	3.9	–	–	–	–	–	17.0
Alco/Open	12–16 Apr 2021	1,000	43.3	27.6	6.8	6.5	4.9	3.4	–	1.6	–	–	–	15.7
GPO/Powergame.gr	6–9 Apr 2021	1,000	42.5	27.8	8.3	7.6	4.7	4.0	–	–	–	–	–	14.7
ProRata/Efimerida ton Sintakton	31 Mar–6 Apr 2021	1,000	41.5	30.0	7.5	5.5	4.0	4.0	–	–	–	–	–	11.5
Pulse RC/Skai	26–28 Mar 2021	1,306	41.5	28.0	8.0	6.0	5.0	3.5	–	–	–	–	–	13.5
Metron Analysis/Mega	17–23 Mar 2021	1,000	43.4	27.5	8.1	5.9	5.8	4.6	–	–	–	–	–	15.9
Marc/Alpha	19–22 Mar 2021	1,003	45.2	25.7	8.1	6.5	5.3	3.5	–	–	–	–	–	19.5
Interview/Vergina TV	17–22 Mar 2021	1,105	42.7	25.4	7.5	5.0	5.9	4.0	–	–	–	–	–	17.3
Alco/Open	12–17 Mar 2021	1,000	42.8	26.7	7.0	6.9	4.9	3.3	–	1.7	–	–	–	16.1
GPO/Powergame.gr	3–5 Mar 2021	1,000	43.2	27.2	8.5	7.5	4.9	3.6	–	–	–	–	–	16.0
GPO/Ta Nea	1–3 Mar 2021	1,000	43.5	27.2	8.5	7.5	4.9	3.6	–	–	–	–	–	16.3
MRB/Star	1–3 Mar 2021	1,000	45.0	28.4	7.2	5.8	5.7	4.4	–	–	–	–	–	16.6
Pulse RC/Skai	26–28 Feb 2021	1,306	42.0	25.5	8.5	6.5	5.0	3.5	–	–	–	–	–	16.5
ProRata/Efimerida ton Sintakton	23–26 Feb 2021	1,000	42.0	30.5	7.0	5.5	3.0	4.5	–	–	–	–	–	11.5
Opinion Poll/Political	22–26 Feb 2021	1,001	46.4	25.1	8.4	6.6	5.2	3.6	–	–	–	–	–	21.3
Opinion Poll/Political	15–19 Feb 2021	1,003	46.3	25.1	8.8	6.6	5.5	3.8	–	–	–	–	–	21.2
Alco/Open	15–18 Feb 2021	1,000	43.2	26.7	7.5	6.3	5.2	3.4	–	1.5	–	–	–	16.5
Interview/Vergina TV	15–17 Feb 2021	1,205	43.2	23.5	9.1	6.0	5.7	3.9	–	–	–	–	–	19.7
Pulse RC/Skai	25–27 Jan 2021	1,506	43.0	25.5	8.0	7.0	5.0	3.5	–	–	–	–	–	17.5
Metron Analysis/Mega	19–25 Jan 2021	1,200	46.3	25.3	8.2	7.3	4.6	3.1	–	–	–	–	–	21.0
GPO/Parapolitika	19–22 Jan 2021	1,000	44.1	27.6	7.3	7.2	4.7	3.5	–	–	–	–	–	16.5
Alco/Open	14–19 Jan 2021	1,000	44.2	27.1	6.7	6.5	4.6	3.1	–	1.5	–	–	–	17.1
Marc/Alpha	7–11 Jan 2021	1,010	48.3	25.0	8.1	6.3	4.8	2.5	–	–	–	–	–	23.3
Opinion Poll/Political	4–8 Jan 2021	1,004	47.8	26.5	8.1	6.3	4.0	3.3	–	–	–	–	–	21.3
Pulse RC/Skai	14–16 Dec 2020	1,210	43.5	26.0	7.5	6.5	5.0	3.5	–	–	–	–	–	17.5
MRB/Star	27 Nov–11 Dec 2020	1,185	44.9	27.2	7.9	5.9	4.8	3.7	1.2	–	–	–	–	17.7
Alco/Open	3–9 Dec 2020	1,000	44.1	26.2	8.0	6.5	4.9	3.5	–	1.7	–	–	–	17.9
Interview/Political	3–8 Dec 2020	1,205	44.8	24.7	8.0	5.5	5.5	3.2	–	–	–	–	–	20.1
Interview/Vergina TV	26 Nov–2 Dec 2020	1,105	45.2	25.4	8.0	5.4	5.9	3.1	–	–	–	–	–	19.8
ProRata/Efimerida ton Sintakton	24–27 Nov 2020	2,726	44.0	29.5	6.0	5.5	3.5	3.5	–	–	–	–	–	14.5
Pulse RC/Skai	24–26 Nov 2020	1,312	44.0	25.5	7.5	6.5	6.0	3.5	–	–	–	–	–	18.5
MRB/Star	22–24 Nov 2020	1,004	47.0	27.1	7.1	5.6	5.3	3.4	–	–	–	–	–	19.9
Kapa Research/iEfimerida	20–24 Nov 2020	1,054	45.7	28.6	7.3	6.2	4.2	3.4	–	–	–	–	–	17.1
Metron Analysis/Mega	18–24 Nov 2020	1,205	45.8	24.8	8.0	6.3	5.5	3.8	–	–	–	–	–	21.0
Opinion Poll/To Manifesto	14–16 Nov 2020	1,000	48.6	24.4	8.4	6.5	4.0	3.6	–	–	–	–	–	24.2
GPO/Parapolitika	10–13 Nov 2020	1,000	44.5	28.9	7.6	6.5	4.3	2.5	–	–	–	–	–	15.6
Alco/Open	6–11 Nov 2020	1,000	43.4	25.9	8.3	6.7	3.6	3.5	1.3	1.3	–	–	–	17.5
GPO/Action24	26–28 Oct 2020	1,000	45.6	28.1	8.3	6.3	3.7	3.1	–	–	–	–	–	17.5
Pulse RC/Skai	19–21 Oct 2020	1,306	45.0	25.5	7.5	6.5	5.0	3.5	–	–	–	–	–	19.5
Interview/Vergina TV	16–21 Oct 2020	1,184	45.5	22.1	8.4	5.8	5.2	3.5	–	–	–	–	–	23.4
Opinion Poll/To Manifesto	11–15 Oct 2020	1,000	49.9	23.8	8.8	6.8	4.2	3.7	–	–	–	–	–	26.1
Marc/Alpha	10–14 Oct 2020	1,007	48.9	24.3	8.1	6.6	4.1	3.1	–	–	–	–	–	24.6
Alco/Open	6–10 Oct 2020	1,000	43.1	25.8	7.6	6.0	4.8	4.2	2.1	1.4	–	–	–	17.3
Metron Analysis/Mega	28–30 Sep 2020	1,388	47.9	25.5	6.9	5.9	5.7	3.4	–	–	1.5	–	–	23.5
Pulse RC/Skai	21–23 Sep 2020	1,407	45.5	26.5	7.5	6.5	4.5	3.0	–	–	–	–	–	19.0
MRB/Star	21–23 Sep 2020	1,009	48.0	25.8	6.2	5.8	5.0	3.6	–	–	–	–	–	22.2
Interview/Vergina TV	21–23 Sep 2020	1,075	45.4	23.0	8.6	5.3	5.2	3.4	–	–	–	–	–	22.4
GPO/Parapolitika	14–16 Sep 2020	1,000	46.6	26.8	8.1	6.6	3.9	3.1	–	–	–	–	–	19.8
Alco/Open	14–16 Sep 2020	1,000	44.4	25.2	7.8	6.1	5.2	3.4	2.0	1.7	–	–	–	19.2
Marc/Proto Thema	10–12 Sep 2020	1,527	49.9	24.6	8.0	6.3	3.7	1.9	–	–	1.6	–	–	25.3
Opinion Poll/To Manifesto	8–10 Sep 2020	1,000	51.1	24.7	7.4	6.3	3.8	2.8	–	–	–	–	–	26.4
GPO/Ta Nea	30 Aug–2 Sep 2020	1,000	46.9	26.7	8.3	6.2	4.2	3.0	–	–	–	–	–	20.2
Interview/Vergina TV	13–15 Jul 2020	1,114	47.4	24.1	7.4	5.2	5.2	4.0	–	–	–	–	–	23.3
Marc/Alpha	10–13 Jul 2020	1,020	50.1	24.6	6.9	6.0	4.1	2.3	1.2	–	1.2	–	–	25.5
Pulse RC/Skai	6–8 Jul 2020	1,305	46.5	26.0	7.0	6.0	4.0	3.0	1.0	–	1.0	–	–	20.5
Alco/Open	29 Jun–4 Jul 2020	1,000	46.1	27.7	6.9	6.0	3.7	3.5	–	1.3	–	–	–	18.4
Opinion Poll/To Manifesto	1–3 Jul 2020	1,100	49.1	24.7	6.9	6.0	4.2	3.0	1.4	1.4	–	–	–	24.4
Kapa Research/iEfimerida	1–2 Jul 2020	1,000	47.3	27.0	6.5	5.2	3.8	3.1	1.7	–	2.2	–	–	20.3
Marc/Proto Thema	1–2 Jul 2020	2,000	52.2	25.5	7.0	6.0	4.4	2.5	–	–	–	–	–	26.7
Metron Analysis/To Vima	24–29 Jun 2020	1,388	48.1	24.6	6.6	7.3	3.7	3.8	–	–	1.8	–	–	23.5
ProRata/Efimerida ton Sintakton	22–26 Jun 2020	2,200	46.0	28.5	6.0	5.0	3.5	3.0	1.0	–	2.0	–	–	17.5
GPO/Ta Nea	22–26 Jun 2020	1,500	49.0	26.0	7.0	6.5	5.0	3.0	–	–	–	–	–	23.0
MRB/Star	17–25 Jun 2020	2,200	46.2	25.2	7.6	6.0	4.4	3.2	1.7	–	–	–	–	21.0
Interview/Vergina TV	4–9 Jun 2020	1,100	47.1	23.6	7.7	5.0	5.2	3.7	–	–	–	–	–	23.5
Alco/Open	2–8 Jun 2020	1,000	46.1	26.8	7.4	6.1	4.2	3.0	1.6	–	–	–	–	19.3
Opinion Poll/Paraskhnio	1–3 Jun 2020	1,060	50.9	24.3	6.4	5.9	4.4	3.3	2.5	–	–	–	–	26.6
Pulse RC/Skai	1–3 Jun 2020	1,208	48.0	26.0	6.5	5.5	4.0	3.5	–	–	–	–	–	22.0
GPO/Parapolitika	22–27 May 2020	1,000	50.2	24.1	7.2	6.5	4.8	3.0	–	–	–	–	–	26.1
Metron Analysis/Mega	22–27 May 2020	1,201	49.6	25.7	6.3	5.7	3.2	3.1	2.0	–	–	–	–	23.9
MRB/Star	8–13 May 2020	1,228	49.7	25.2	6.2	5.3	4.8	3.7	–	–	–	–	–	24.5
Alco/Open	5–10 May 2020	1,000	46.2	26.1	6.8	6.4	4.4	2.5	2.8	1.2	–	–	–	20.1
Opinion Poll/To Manifesto	7–9 May 2020	1,080	50.4	25.1	5.6	6.3	5.0	3.8	1.4	–	–	–	–	25.3
Pulse RC/Skai	4–6 May 2020	1,207	48.0	25.0	7.0	6.0	4.5	3.0	1.5	–	–	–	–	23.0
Interview/Vergina TV	3–6 May 2020	1,105	49.0	23.1	7.4	5.3	5.2	3.4	–	–	–	–	–	25.9
ProRata/Efimerida ton Sintakton	24–29 Apr 2020	2,500	46.0	28.0	6.0	6.0	5.0	3.0	2.0	–	–	–	–	18.0
Metron Analysis/Mega	22–28 Apr 2020	1,204	50.4	25.4	5.9	5.6	3.4	3.8	1.8	–	–	–	–	25.0
GPO/Parapolitika	14–22 Apr 2020	1,000	49.8	25.8	7.3	5.5	4.9	3.0	–	–	–	–	–	24.0
Kapa Research/iEfimerida	15–17 Apr 2020	1,060	49.0	27.3	5.9	5.1	3.8	3.3	2.4	–	–	–	–	21.7
Marc/Alpha	11–13 Apr 2020	1,020	52.7	24.5	6.5	5.8	3.7	2.4	1.8	–	–	–	–	28.2
Pulse RC/Skai	30 Mar–1 Apr 2020	1,250	50.5	24.5	6.0	5.5	5.0	3.0	1.0	–	–	–	–	26.0
Opinion Poll/To Manifesto	23–26 Mar 2020	1,095	50.5	25.5	6.3	6.9	5.7	2.5	–	–	–	–	–	25.0
Opinion Poll/Proto Thema	6–7 Mar 2020	1,200	48.7	26.1	5.7	6.3	5.7	3.4	–	–	–	–	–	22.6
Alco/Open	2–7 Mar 2020	1,000	43.9	28.1	7.2	6.6	6.2	2.7	3.6	1.5	–	–	–	15.8
Pulse RC/Skai	3–4 Mar 2020	1,258	43.5	28.0	7.5	5.5	6.0	3.0	1.5	–	–	–	–	15.5
Opinion Poll/To Manifesto	22–27 Jan 2020	1,098	48.1	26.7	6.3	5.8	5.4	3.4	–	–	–	–	–	21.4
Metron Analysis/To Vima	20–22 Jan 2020	1,203	45.2	26.8	7.1	6.1	5.8	4.9	–	–	–	–	–	18.4
Pulse RC/Skai	21–22 Jan 2020	1,210	43.0	29.0	7.5	5.5	5.0	3.5	1.5	–	–	–	–	14.0
MRB/Star	13–17 Jan 2020	1,436	43.5	26.4	7.5	6.2	5.3	4.1	1.7	–	–	–	–	17.1
Interview/Vergina TV	7–8 Jan 2020	1,005	45.8	28.1	5.4	5.4	4.7	3.5	–	–	–	–	–	17.7
Pulse RC/Skai	16–18 Dec 2019	1,202	42.5	28.0	7.5	6.0	5.0	3.5	2.5	–	–	–	–	14.5
MRB/Star	27 Nov–5 Dec 2019	2,000	41.5	27.6	8.7	6.2	4.8	3.6	3.0	–	–	–	–	13.9
Opinion Poll/To Manifesto	25–28 Nov 2019	1,058	49.0	27.8	6.4	6.2	5.4	3.6	–	–	–	–	–	21.2
Metron Analysis/To Vima	18–20 Nov 2019	1,000	45.4	25.7	7.5	5.8	5.1	4.6	1.7	–	–	–	–	19.7
Pulse RC/Skai	18–20 Nov 2019	1,211	43.5	27.5	7.0	6.0	4.5	4.0	1.0	–	–	–	–	16.0
Palmos Analysis/GUE–NGL	11–14 Nov 2019	1,013	40.6	27.4	6.4	6.8	4.3	3.5	3.9	1.3	–	–	–	13.2
Marc/Proto Thema	29–31 Oct 2019	1,003	47.6	27.5	6.7	6.0	3.4	3.4	2.2	1.4	–	–	–	20.1
Pulse RC/Skai	22–23 Oct 2019	1,103	44.0	28.5	7.0	5.5	4.0	4.5	1.5	–	–	–	–	15.5
Pulse RC/Skai	17–18 Sep 2019	1,110	44.5	29.5	7.0	5.0	3.5	4.5	–	–	–	–	–	15.0
Metron Analysis/To Vima	16–18 Sep 2019	1,202	46.1	26.8	7.1	6.8	3.9	4.4	1.8	–	–	–	–	19.3
MRB/Star	14–16 Sep 2019	1,020	44.4	26.7	7.8	5.9	3.8	5.2	–	–	–	–	–	17.7
Marc/Proto Thema	2–5 Sep 2019	1,001	45.9	28.2	7.4	5.8	3.3	3.3	1.8	1.3	–	–	–	17.7
Opinion Poll/To Manifesto	2–4 Sep 2019	1,102	48.3	26.6	6.2	5.1	3.7	3.8	2.4	1.6	–	–	–	21.7
2019 parliamentary election	7 Jul 2019	—	39.9; 158	31.5; 86	8.1; 22	5.3; 15	3.7; 10	3.4; 9	2.9; 0	1.5; 0	–	0.7; 0	–	8.4
