= Grevena (constituency) =

Parliamentary constituency of Greece

- Electoral constituency for the Hellenic Parliament
- Grevena within Greece
- Regional units: Grevena
- Administrative region: Western Macedonia
- Population: 43,603 (2015)

Current constituency
- Created: 2012
- Number of members: 1

The Grevena electoral constituency (Greek: περιφέρεια Γρεβενών) is a parliamentary constituency of Greece.

== Election Results ==
=== Parliamentary ===
2000

2004

2007

2009

5/2012

6/2012

1/2015

9/2015

2019

5/2023

6/2023

=== European ===
2009

2014

2019

2024

== See also ==
- List of parliamentary constituencies of Greece
