= Cephalonia (constituency) =

Parliamentary constituency of Greece

- Electoral constituency for the Hellenic Parliament
- Location within Greece
- Regional units: Cephalonia, Ithaca
- Administrative region: Ionian Islands
- Electorate: 57.640 (January 2015)

Current Electoral constituency
- Number of members: 1 Member of Parliament

Cephalonia (Greek: Κεφαλληνία, romanized: Kefallinia) is a parliamentary constituency returning one MP to the Greek Parliament. It comprises the Cephalonia Prefecture.

== Election results ==
=== Legislative Election ===
Cephalonia constituency results

| Election | 1st party | 2nd party | 3rd party | 4th party | 5th party | source |
|---|---|---|---|---|---|---|
| January 2015 | SYRIZA 38.25% | New Democracy 28.92% | KKE 9.34% | XA 6.04% | PASOK 4.44% | |
| September 2015 | SYRIZA 33.95% | New Democracy 27.55% | KKE 10.12% | XA 7.38% | PASOK 5.61% | |
| 2019 | New Democracy 37.94% | SYRIZA 32.45% | KKE 9.52% | PASOK 5.82% | MeRA25 3.45% | |
| May 2023 | New Democracy 36.67% | SYRIZA 26.08% | KKE 10.95% | PASOK 9.74% | PE 3.53% | |
| June 2023 | New Democracy 38.15% | SYRIZA 19.69% | KKE 12.36% | PASOK 10.44% | Spartans 4.90% | |

== Members of Parliament ==
| Election | Member | Party |
|---|---|---|
| 2007 | Alexandros Parissis | New Democracy |
| 2009 | Spyridon Moschopoulos | PASOK |
| May 2012 | Afroditi Theopeftatou | Syriza |
| Jun 2012 | Afroditi Theopeftatou | Syriza |
| Jan 2015 | Afroditi Theopeftatou | Syriza |
| Sep 2015 | Afroditi Theopeftatou | Syriza |
| 2019 | Panagis Kappatos | New Democracy |
