= Samos (constituency) =

Parliamentary constituency of Greece

- Electoral constituency for the Hellenic Parliament
- Samos constituency within Greece
- Regional units: Samos, Ikaria
- Administrative region: North Aegean
- Population: 52,723 (2015)

Current constituency
- Created: 2012
- Number of members: 1

The Samos electoral constituency (Greek: περιφέρεια Σάμου) is a parliamentary constituency of Greece. It is a single-member district and elected one MP to the Hellenic Parliament.

== See also ==
- List of parliamentary constituencies of Greece
