= Lefkada (constituency) =

Parliamentary constituency of Greece

- Electoral constituency for the Hellenic Parliament
- Zakynthos within Greece
- Regional units: Lefkada
- Administrative region: Ionian Islands
- Population: 29,176 (2011)

Current constituency
- Created: 2012
- Number of members: 1

The Lefkada electoral constituency (Greek: Εκλογική περιφέρεια Λευκάδας) is a parliamentary constituency of Greece. It is a single-member district and elected one MP to the Hellenic Parliament.

== See also ==
- List of parliamentary constituencies of Greece
