= Centrism by country =

Centrism is a range of political ideology associated with moderate politics placed between left-wing politics and right-wing politics on the left–right political spectrum. Various centrist movements have developed in different countries and regions, based on the specific country and region's political environment.

== Australia ==
There have been centrists on both sides of politics who serve alongside the various factions within the Liberal and Labor parties. Centrism is represented by the moderates in the Liberal Party and Labor Right in the Labor Party. The Australian Democrats are the most prominent centrist party in Australian history. The party had representation in the Senate from 1977 to 2007, frequently holding the balance of power. Formed by Don Chipp on a promise to "Keep the Bastards Honest", it was known to have represented the "middle ground". The party regained registration in 2019. In addition, many smaller groups have formed in response to the bipartisan system that upholds centrist ideals. South Australian Senator Nick Xenophon launched his centrist political party called the Nick Xenophon Team (NXT) in 2014, which was renamed the Centre Alliance in 2018.

== Bangladesh ==
Traditionally, in Bangladeshi politics, the term "centre" (as well as centre-left) is labelled with Bengali nationalism and secularism, in contrast to the right wing, which is labelled with Bangladeshi nationalism and Islamism. The Awami League is the oldest existing centrist political party in Bangladesh. It was originally founded as a centre-left party but moved towards centrism in the late 1970s. However, in recent years, the party has been cited as far-right due to its authoritarian tendency & human rights abuse. Other centrist political parties in Bangladesh include the National Citizen Party, Nationalist Democratic Movement, Liberal Democratic Party, and Bikalpa Dhara Bangladesh. Bangladesh Nationalist Party, one of the dominant parties of Bangladesh, also shows centrist tendency.

== Belgium ==
The traditional centrist party of Flanders was the People's Union, which embraced social liberalism and aimed to represent Dutch-speaking Belgians who felt culturally suppressed by Francophones. The New Flemish Alliance is the largest and, since 2009, the only extant successor of that party. It is, however, primarily composed of the right wing of the former People's Union and has adopted a more liberal-conservative ideology in recent years. Among French-speaking Belgians, the Humanist Democratic Centre is a centre party as it is considerably less conservative than its Flemish counterpart, Christian Democratic and Flemish. Other parties in the centre of the political spectrum are the liberal Reformist Movement and the French-speaking minority party DéFI.

== Brazil ==
There are several centrist parties in Brazil, such as the Brazilian Democratic Movement (MDB), a catch-all party and one of the largest political parties in Brazil. The Brazilian Social Democracy Party (PSDB) is another example of a centrist party in Brazilian politics. Other centrist parties include the Social Democratic Party (Brazil, 2011) (PSD), the Green Party (Brazil) (PV), Citizenship (Brazil) (CID), and the Republican Party of the Social Order (PROS). Due to the high number of centre parties in Brazil, they exert a major position in local politics, and due to that, parties that are not part of major parties of the right-wing or the left-wing are pejoratively called Centrão (meaning 'big centre').

== Canada ==
Throughout modern history, Canadian governments at the federal level have governed from a moderate, centrist political position, practicing "brokerage politics". (Note: Brokerage politics: "A Canadian term for successful big tent parties that embody a pluralistic catch-all approach to appeal to the median Canadian voter ... adopting centrist policies and electoral coalitions to satisfy the short-term preferences of a majority of electors who are not located on the ideological fringe.") Both the Liberal Party of Canada and the Conservative Party of Canada (or its predecessors) rely on attracting support from a broad spectrum of voters. As the historically dominant party, Liberals position themselves at the centre to centre-left of the Canadian political spectrum, being substantially more moderate and centrist than the right-wing Conservatives. In the late 1970s, Prime Minister Pierre Elliott Trudeau claimed that his Liberal Party of Canada adhered to the "radical centre". Far-left and far-right politics have never been prominent forces in Canadian society. In 2024, 65% of Canadians described themselves as "centrist".

== Croatia ==
The Croatian People's Party – Liberal Democrats and the People's Party – Reformists may be considered centrist parties. The agrarian Croatian Peasant Party became moderate and centrist during its last years, having been centre-right in the past.

== Czech Republic ==
The Czech Republic has many prominent centrist parties, including the syncretic populist movement ANO 2011, the civil libertarian Czech Pirate Party, the long-standing Christian and Democratic Union – Czechoslovak People's Party, and the localist party Mayors and Independents.

== France ==
France has a tradition of parties that call themselves "centriste", though the actual parties vary over time. When a new political issue emerges and a new political party breaks into the mainstream, the old centre-left party may be de facto pushed rightwards, but unable to consider itself a party of the right, it will embrace being the new centre. This process occurred with Orléanism, Moderate Républicanism, Radical Republicanism, and Radical-Socialism. The most notable centrist party is Renaissance (LREM), founded by Emmanuel Macron, who was elected President of France in May 2017. Macron prefers not to use the term "centrist" to describe himself, though his policies tend to be centrist. Anotherparty is the Democratic Movement of François Bayrou, founded in 2007, which was the successor of the Christian democratic Union for French Democracy.

== Germany ==
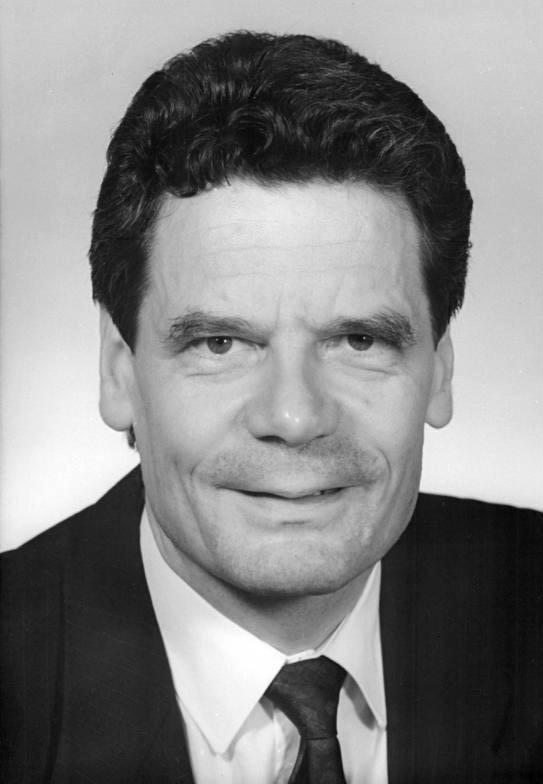
In 1990, Joachim Gauck (who is a former German President, centrist politician and activist without party affiliation) took part in the Alliance 90, which had become independent after its merger with The Greens.

Politische Mitte (German for 'political middle' / 'political centre') is used for the political centre and centrism. Historically, the German party with the most purely centrist nature among German parties to have had current or historical parliamentary representations was most likely the social-liberal German Democratic Party of the Weimar Republic (1918–1933).

During the Weimar Republic (and again after the Nazi period), there existed a Zentrum, a party of German Catholics founded in 1870. It was called the Centre Party not for being a proper centrist party but because it united left-wing and right-wing Catholics, because it was the first German party to be a Volkspartei (catch-all party), and because his elected representatives sat between the liberals (the left of the time) and the conservatives (the right of the time). However, it was distinctly right-wing conservative in that it was not neutral on religious issues (such as secular education), being markedly against more liberal and modernist positions.

The main successor of Zentrum after the return of democracy to West Germany in 1945, the Christian Democratic Union, has, throughout its history, alternated between describing itself as right-wing or centrist and sitting on the right-wing (with the Free Democratic Party in its social liberal moments sitting at its left, in the centre, and themselves sitting at the centre, with the FDP in its classical liberal moments sitting at its right, in the right-wing). The representatives of the Social Democratic Party of Germany, although they have referred to themselves as "the new middle" many times since the 1990s (under the influence of the Third Way of the time), feel less at ease describing their party as centrist due to their history and socialist identity.

Alliance 90/The Greens was founded in 1993 as a merger of the East German Alliance 90 (a group of centrist and transversalist civil rights activists) and the (West) German Greens. The latter was a coalition of various unorthodox-left politicians and more liberal "realists". This Bundestag party also hesitates to use the term centre, although it distances itself from the left, which identifies it for the moment as a transversalist party. The transversalist moderation of the party and its position in the Bundestag between the Social Democrats and the Christian Democrats also point somewhat to The Greens being a more or less centrist party.

In the state parliaments of specific German states, other specifically regional parties could be identified as centrist. The South Schleswig Voter Federation of the Danish and Frisian minorities in the state of Schleswig-Holstein currently has a centrist political position, although, in the past, the party usually leaned to the left. In the German presidential elections of 2009, 2010, and 2012, it supported the candidates of the Social Democrats and the Greens. In Bavaria, the Free Voters party at the state parliament may also be seen as a centrist party.

== Greece ==
In modern Greek politics, the roots of centrism can be traced to the centrist politician and founder of the Agricultural and Labour Party, Alexandros Papanastasiou. In 1961, Georgios Papandreou created, along with other political leaders, the coalition party of the Centre Union. Five parties were merged: the Liberal Party, the Progressive Agricultural Democratic Union, the National Progressive Centre Union, and the Popular Social Party, into one with a strong centrist agenda, opposed equally to the right-wing party of the National Radical Union and the left-wing party of the United Democratic Left. The Centre Union Party was the last Venizelist party to hold power in Greece. The party nominally continued to exist until 1977 (after the Junta, known as the Centre Union – New Forces), when its successor Union of the Democratic Centre (EDIK) party was created.

The Union of Centrists was created by Vassilis Leventis in 1992 under the title "Union of Centrists and Ecologists", though the name was changed shortly after. The Union of Centrists claims to be the ideological continuation of the old party Centre Union. The party strives to become "the political continuance of the centrist expression in Greece". Leventis aimed to become part of the Venizelist legacy of some great politicians of the past, such as Eleftherios Venizelos and George Papandreou Sr. However, the party's total influence had been marginal until 2015, with 1.8% of the total votes (in the January 2015 Greek legislative election) being its highest achievement before finally making its way to the Greek Parliament in September 2015 with 3.4% of the total votes and nine members elected. A short-lived social liberal party, The River, founded and led by Stavros Theodorakis, gained seats both in the Greek and European parliaments in 2015. The River dissolved in 2019.

== India ==
The Indian National Congress, the Aam Aadmi Party, and the Nationalist Congress Party are the centrist national parties. Three state parties, All India Trinamool Congress, Bharat Rashtra Samithi and Telugu Desam Party, are also described as centrists, along with actor-turned-politician Kamal Haasan's party named Makkal Needhi Maiam, meaning People's Centre for Justice.

== Indonesia ==
Golkar, a major political party in Indonesia, has established itself and also gained a reputation as a centrist party when it comes to addressing the challenges of the country's diversity. Pancasila and the unity of Indonesia has always been the fundamental norms in resolving various problems.

== Ireland ==
In Ireland, both Fine Gael and Fianna Fáil claim the political centre ground but lean to the centre-right. The two parties have broadly similar policies, with their division originating in Irish Civil War politics. Fine Gael is aligned with Christian democratic parties in Europe via its membership in the European People's Party.

== Israel ==
In Israel, centrism is represented by the Yesh Atid Party, led by Yair Lapid, the former Prime Minister of Israel. The party was founded in 2013 and has remained a major player on the political scene. It served in government between 2013 and 2015, with Lapid serving as Israel's Finance Minister and a member of the Security Cabinet. In 2020, after a year of political turmoil in Israel, Yair Lapid became the Leader of the Opposition to the fifth government of Benjamin Netanyahu, and in 2021, he was sworn in as Minister of Foreign Affairs in the government of Naftali Bennett. After that, he became the prime minister of Israel in June 2022.

== Japan ==
According to the Encyclopedia Britannica, the Constitutional Democratic Party (Rikken Minseitō), a major political party in pre-war Japan was a centrist party.

Following World War II, the official political ideology of the Japan Farmers Party was essentially centrist, aimed for a neither belonging to the left nor the right. Similarly, the Democratic Party (1947) was also considered as a centrist party, ideologically positioned between the left-wing Japan Socialist Party (JSP) and the right-wing Liberal Democratic Party (LDP). Since the 1960s, centrist parties have emerged, the old Komeito, the Democratic Socialist Party, and the Socialist Democratic Federation. In 1992, reformers left the right-wing LDP and founded the centre to centre-right liberal Japan New Party, but it was disbanded after two years.

Founded in 1998 by former members of the LDP, the Social Democratic Party, and the NFP, the Democratic Party of Japan (DPJ) billed itself as a "democratic centre" (民主中道, minshu-chūdō) of anti-LDP forces. Additionally, the DPJ was described as centrist by various sources. The Democratic Party for the People (DPFP), which continues the current DPJ trend, is advocating "reformist centrism" (改革中道). The Constitutional Democratic Party of Japan (CDP) is considered a centrist, also referred to as center-left.

== Nepal ==
The Rastriya Swatantra Party, fourth Largest National Party of Nepal is often described as a Centrist party.

== Netherlands ==
In the Netherlands, four moderate centrist to centre-right parties have sent members into the Third Rutte cabinet since 2017. From them, the Christian Democratic Appeal (CDA) and the People's Party for Freedom and Democracy (VVD) tend to be centre-right, whilst the social liberal Democrats 66 (D66) are more centrist. The Protestant Christian Union is a small Christian Democratic party with transversalist positions less typical of European centrist parties. They have participated in several coalitions due to their moderate centrist politics. Another centrist party is the populist Pensioners' interests party 50PLUS, which combines social democratic, social liberal, and social conservative positions. Livable Netherlands was originally a centrist political movement of local grass-roots parties with an anti-establishment touch similar to early D66. However, the party entered in 2002 national parliament with a right-wing populist programme based on security and immigration as the major issues.

In the 1980s and 1990s, two self-described "centre" parties, the Centre Party and the Centre Democrats, were represented in the Dutch parliament at some point. However, these parties were considered far right (in the case of the Centre Democrats) or even extreme right (in the case of the Centre Party) in their opinion about foreign immigration. Both parties denied being racist or extremist. The party slogan of the Centre Party was "Dutch: Niet rechts, niet links, lit. 'Neither rightist, nor leftist'", and in some respect could be seen as a centrist (or more correctly, Third Position) party since it borrowed ideas from the political (far) right (a tough stand on immigration combined with typical racial prejudice) and the political left (mixed economy, green politics). However, both parties did not have a coherent ideology; they were one-issue parties focused on what they perceived as mass immigration from non-European countries.

== New Zealand ==
Centrism in New Zealand has only been mainstream since New Zealand First was founded in 1993. The party platforms itself on a broad centrist position, mainly on economic issues and populism, while being generally conservative on social issues, favouring binding referendums instead of MPs making major social decisions. New Zealand First could be described as syncretic politically, or adopting key elements from the traditional left-right political spectrum. The party has twice found itself the kingmakers under the mixed-member proportional representation electoral system (MMP), meaning that they choose who will form the next government. This has happened in 1996 and in 2017.

Small centrist parties such as The Opportunities Party (TOP) have been formed in the past, but they have not gained major support and have never passed the 5% threshold to enter parliament. The role of centrism in New Zealand has been mainly to work with parties to form coalition governments and to provide alternatives to governments, and their ability to do so is mainly due to the MMP electoral system, which provides more ground for minor parties in Parliament. In the 2020 New Zealand general election, where Jacinda Ardern and the New Zealand Labour Party achieved a majority in the New Zealand House of Representatives, New Zealand First was not re-elected to Parliament due to the party's inability to reach the 5% threshold to enter parliament. After 2023 New Zealand general election, New Zealand First made a government coalition with National Party and ACT New Zealand.

== Nordic countries ==
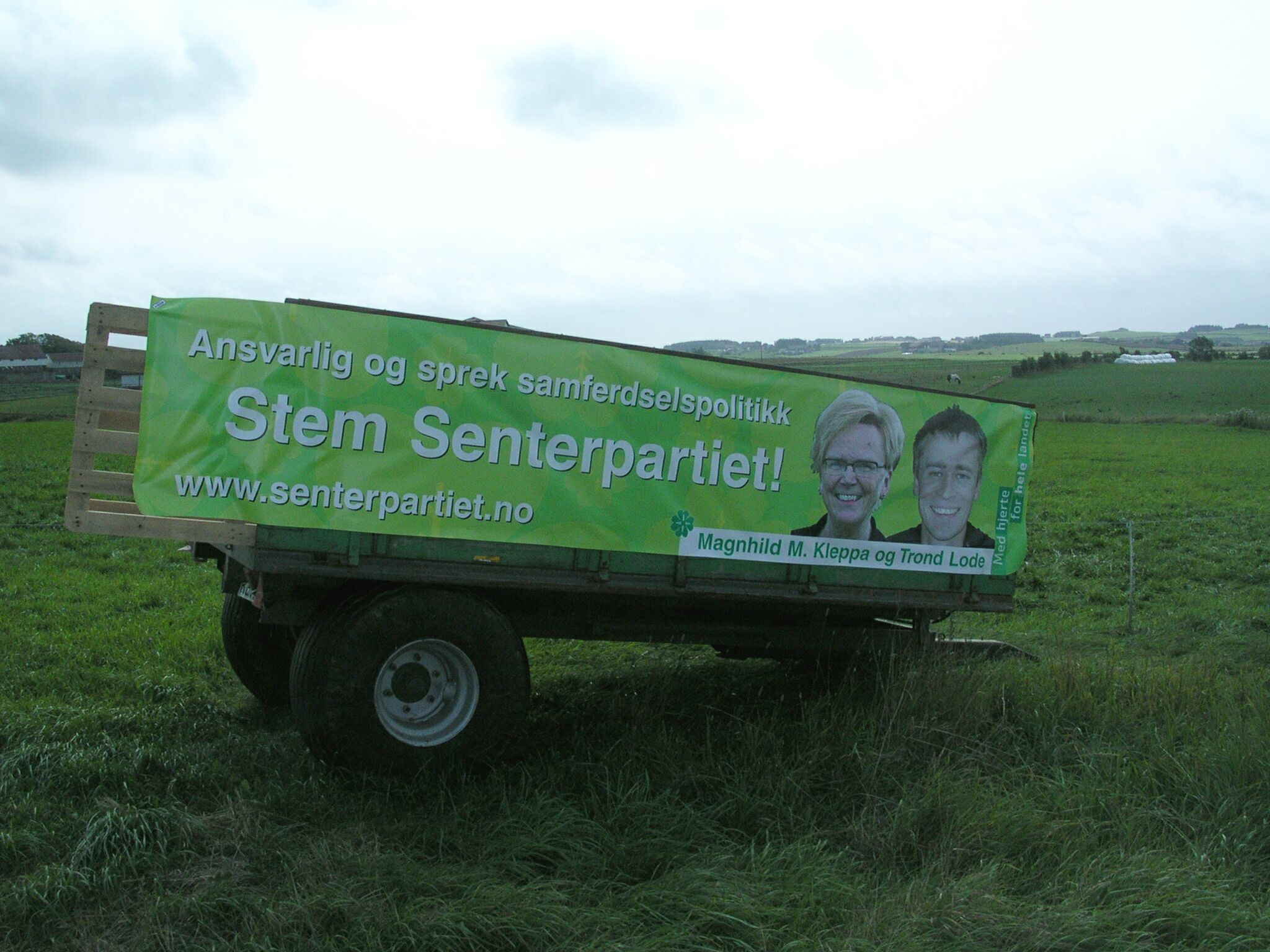
Campaign for the Norwegian Centre Party at Nærbø: like its Finnish and Swedish counterparts, the party has a strong focus on decentralisation and rural and agrarian issues.

In most of the Nordic countries, there are Nordic agrarian parties. In addition to the centrist position on the socio-economic left-right scale, these share a clear, separate ideology. Centrists have aligned themselves with the Liberal International and European Liberal Democrat and Reform Party. Historically, these parties were farmers' parties committed to maintaining rural life. In the 1960s, these parties broadened their scope to include non-farmer-related issues and renamed themselves the Centre Party in Sweden, Venstre in Denmark, Centre Party in Finland, Centre Party in Norway, and Progressive Party in Iceland.

Neither the Centre Democrats (a now-defunct centrist political party) nor the Liberal Alliance (a political party founded as a centrist social liberal party but that now is a classical liberal party), both of Denmark, are rooted in centrist agrarianism. Other political parties in the Nordic countries that deviate from the agrarian tradition are the Venstre in Norway and the Swedish People's Party in Finland.

== Pakistan ==
Pakistan Tehreek-e-Insaf (PTI), founded by Imran Khan, claims to be a centrist political party. Following the general election of 2013, PTI emerged as the second-largest political party in Pakistan by number of votes. In July 2018, it won the general elections of Pakistan and chairman Imran Khan became prime minister.

== Palestine ==
The Third Way is a small centrist Palestinian political party active in Palestinian politics. Founded on 16 December 2005, the party is led by Salam Fayyad and Hanan Ashrawi. In the January 2006 PLC elections, it received 2.4% of the popular vote and won two of the Council's 132 seats. The party presents itself as an alternative to the two-party system of Hamas and Fatah.

== Poland ==
Civic Platform (PO), ruling from 2007 to 2015, began in 2001 as a liberal conservative party but later, under the leadership of Donald Tusk, became typically centrist to attract left-leaning liberal voters. Depending on the context, it is described as either Christian democratic (it is a member of the European People's Party), conservative, liberal, or social. Its pragmatism, technocracy, and lack of ideology have nevertheless been criticized. Under Grzegorz Schetyna, it was announced that it had shifted to the right. Under its current leader, Borys Budka, as a part of the Civic Coalition, it turned to progressivism again, as seen by policies proposed by their candidate, Rafał Trzaskowski, in the 2020 presidential election. Other political groups, such as the Polish People's Party (PSL), may be described as centrist too. In contrast, the national-moral right-wing Law and Justice is socially conservative while usually at the same time being economically left-wing and favourable to protectionist policies). The most recent political party in the Polish parliament, Poland 2050, led by Szymon Hołownia, has been described as ideologically centrist with strong pragmatic influences.

== Spain ==
The only national party that defends itself as a centrist party is Citizens, whose platform is increasingly perceived as right-wing by Spanish citizens, as the Centro de Investigaciones Sociológicas surveys show. In April 2018, Ciudadanos obtained a 6.77 when ranging political parties from 1 to 10, where one was the farthest left and ten was its equivalent on the right. It first entered the Cortes Generales in 2015. In Catalonia, where the party was born, many people even consider it an extreme right-wing party, considering its fierce "opposition to nationalism". Not even the media agree on its place, and several newspapers from different ideologies manifest that Citizens is either left or right, depending on their political line. Regardless of subjective opinions, the truth is that Ciudadanos has always tried to reach agreements with Union, Progress and Democracy (UPyD), which Spanish voters most traditionally consider to be the closest to the centre, according to several opinion polls. This popular perception was pointed out by UPyD, which positions itself simultaneously on the political centre and cross-sectionalism, thus embracing ideas across the political spectrum. Electors also consider as centrists the Convergence and Union coalition from Catalonia and the Basque Nationalist Party from the Spanish Basque Country, although these two usually consider themselves as right-centrist parties.

== Switzerland ==
In Switzerland, the political centre (German: die Mitte; French: le Centre; Italian: il Centro) is traditionally occupied by the so-called "bourgeois" parties: FDP.The Liberals (centre-right (Note: The party itself rejects the left-right notion, stating on its FAQ-page that it is a centrist party.)), The Centre and its predecessors (centre to centre-right (Note: In urban and Protestant areas, the party tends to be more centrist than in rural, predominantly Catholic areas.)), and the much smaller Evangelical People's Party (centre to centre-left (Note: The party rejects the left-right classification, but it tends to be on the centre or centre-left on social and environmental issues, centrist on economic issues and centre-right on ethical issues.)). In Switzerland, the centrist parties tend to cooperate closely in cantonal parliaments and municipal councils. In the early decades of the 21st century, two newly founded parties have claimed to be part of the political centre: the Green Liberal Party (centre), split from the leftist Green Party, claims to represent the political centre. The Conservative Democratic Party (centre to centre-right), a splinter of the right-wing populist Swiss People's Party, was a self-styled centre party until its 2021 merger with The Centre. The Social Democratic Party is considered to be more left-wing than centrist.

== United Kingdom ==
In 1981, Roy Jenkins, David Owen, Shirley Williams, and Bill Rodgers, known collectively as the "Gang of Four", launched the Social Democratic Party, outlining their policies in what became known as the Limehouse Declaration. The "Gang of Four" were centrists who defected from the Labour Party because of what they perceived to be the influence of Militant and the "hard left" within it. The SDP merged with the Liberal Party in 1988 to create the centrist Liberal Democrats.

In the mid-to-late 1990s, Labour, under the leadership of Tony Blair, began to move towards a centrist Third Way policy platform, adopting the campaign name New Labour. The New Labour era ended when Blair's successor, Gordon Brown, lost the 2010 general election to the Conservatives. Brown's successor as leader, Ed Miliband, moved the party to the left of New Labour. The Blue Labour movement, launched in 2009, attempted to cultivate a new path for Labour centrism that would appeal to socially conservative working-class voters. The party later moved decisively to the left when the socialist Jeremy Corbyn became the leader in 2015 due to the introduction of a one member, one vote system under Miliband.

In 2011, Nick Clegg, then leader of the Liberal Democrats and Deputy Prime Minister of the United Kingdom, stated that he believed that his party belonged to the radical centre, mentioning John Maynard Keynes, William Beveridge, Jo Grimond, David Lloyd George, and John Stuart Mill as examples that preceded the Liberal Democrats' establishment in 1988. In the mid-to-late 2000s, David Cameron also moved the Conservative Party towards the centre and, following the 2010 general election, formed a coalition with the Liberal Democrats. In the 2015 general election, the Conservatives gained a majority, and the Liberal Democrats lost most of their seats. They regained a small number of seats in the 2017 general election. On her appointment as prime minister, Cameron's successor, Theresa May, stated her wish to tackle social inequality and adopted some of Ed Miliband's policies, such as regulating energy companies. However, the party's 2017 manifesto was seen as a sharp break from the centre ground, appealing to traditionally Tory heartland issues in the aftermath of the UK's Brexit referendum.

Following the Brexit referendum, politics in the UK was seen as having reverted to traditionally polarised "left and right" politics. For the 2017 election, the group More United was set up in the vein of the US Super PAC model to support candidates from multiple parties who meet its values; it supported primarily Labour and Lib Dem MPs and one Conservative. In 2018, a group set up by Simon Franks amassed £50 million to start a new centrist political party in the UK to field candidates at the next general election. It was reportedly named United for Change.

In early 2019, difficulties and party clashes regarding Brexit caused many Labour and Conservative MPs to leave their parties, forming a pro-European group named The Independent Group for Change. They later announced their intention to register as a formal party named Change UK. Most sources identified the party as centrist, with Change UK MP Chris Leslie describing the party as "offering a home to those on the centre-left". Former Change UK MP Chuka Umunna joined the Liberal Democrats shortly after the party's formation after disappointing results in the 2019 European Parliament election in the United Kingdom. After losing all its MPs in the 2019 general election, the party was disbanded.

== United States ==
One could argue the first centrist movement was the Tertium Quids, also called the "Old Republicans." While initially founded as a radical movement in its own right seeking to uphold the principles of '98, this political faction eventually moderated (especially in Pennsylvania and New York State) and sought to work with both moderate Republicans and Federalists. Unlike the Jeffersonian Republicans, who sought to build a society, as historian Andrew Shankman put it, "Naive, utopian hopes for a simple agrarian commercial economy without debt, a standing army, a navy, or a vigorous national state," the Tertium Quids sought to work with the Federalists, especially in Pennsylvania, to help build up a trade-centered and urban manufacturing-based commercial economy.

After World War II, centrism was a dominant political philosophy in the United States but lacked its own party in the traditionally two-party country. For example, historian Arthur Schlesinger Jr. characterised political moderation as a vigorous "Third Force" in his 1949 book, The Vital Center. The book defended liberal democracy and a state-regulated market economy against the totalitarianism of communism and fascism. Harry Truman, who served as U.S. president from 1945 until 1953, is regarded as a centrist Democrat, while Dwight Eisenhower, president from 1953 to 1961, is regarded as a centrist Republican.

The early 1990s were perhaps the high water mark of post-war centrist politics in America. Journalist and political commentator E. J. Dionne wrote in his book Why Americans Hate Politics, published on the eve of the 1992 presidential election, that he believes American voters are looking for a "New Political Center" that intermixes "liberal instincts" and "conservative values". He labelled people in this centre position as "tolerant traditionalists". He described them as believers in conventional social morals that ensure family stability, as tolerant within reason of those who challenge those morals, and as pragmatically supportive of government intervention in spheres such as education, child care, and health care, as long as budgets are balanced. Independent candidate H. Ross Perot, who focused on pragmatic issues like a balanced budget and was viewed as a populist centrist, garnered nearly 19% of the popular vote in the 1992 presidential election, even though he ran against Bill Clinton, a centrist Democrat, and George H. W. Bush, a centre-right Republican. Perot went on to form the Reform Party and run a second time in the 1996 presidential election, but with less success.

A late-2011 Gallup poll of Americans' attitudes towards government reported that 17% expressed conservative views, 22% expressed libertarian views, 20% expressed communitarian views, 17% expressed centrist views, and 24% expressed liberal views. Americans Elect, a coalition of American centrists funded by wealthy donors such as business magnate Michael Bloomberg, former junk-bond trader Peter Ackerman, and hedge fund manager John H. Burbank III, launched an effort in mid-2011 to create a national "virtual primary" that would challenge the current two-party system. The group aimed to nominate a presidential ticket of centrists with names that would be on ballots in all 50 states. The group banked on broad cultural dissatisfaction with the partisan gridlock in Washington, D.C. The Christian Science Monitor has stated that "the political climate couldn't be riper for a serious third-party alternative" such as their effort, but the "hurdles Americans Elect faces are daunting" to get on ballots.

Washington political journalist Linda Killian wrote in her 2012 book The Swing Vote that Americans are frustrated with Congress and its dysfunction and inability to do its job. Many Americans are unsatisfied with the political process because of many factors, such as the influx of money into politics and the influence of special interests and lobbyists. The book classifies four types of independent voters, including "NPR Republicans", "America First Democrats", "The Facebook Generation", and "Starbucks Moms and Dads", who were big determinates of swing votes in the 2012 presidential election. Journalist and author John Avlon wrote in his 2005 book Independent Nation that centrism is not a matter of compromise or reading polls; rather, it is an antidote to the politics of divisiveness, providing principled opposition to political extremes. Centrists in the two major U.S. political parties are often found in the New Democrat Coalition, the Blue Dog Coalition of the Democratic Party, the Republican Main Street Partnership of the Republican Party, and the bipartisan Problem Solvers Caucus. Barack Obama has been widely identified as a centrist Democratic president, as has Joe Biden. Outside the two major parties, some centrists inhabit the Libertarian Party, independent candidature movements such as Unite America, co-founded by Charles Wheelan, the Forward Party, established by Andrew Yang in 2021, and No Labels, a centrist political group that pursued a bipartisan third-party "unity ticket" for the 2024 presidential election, but abandoned the effort in April 2024 after failing to identify candidates it believed had a credible path to victory.
