= 2017 Greek centre-left leadership election =

12 November and 19 November 2017	2021 →
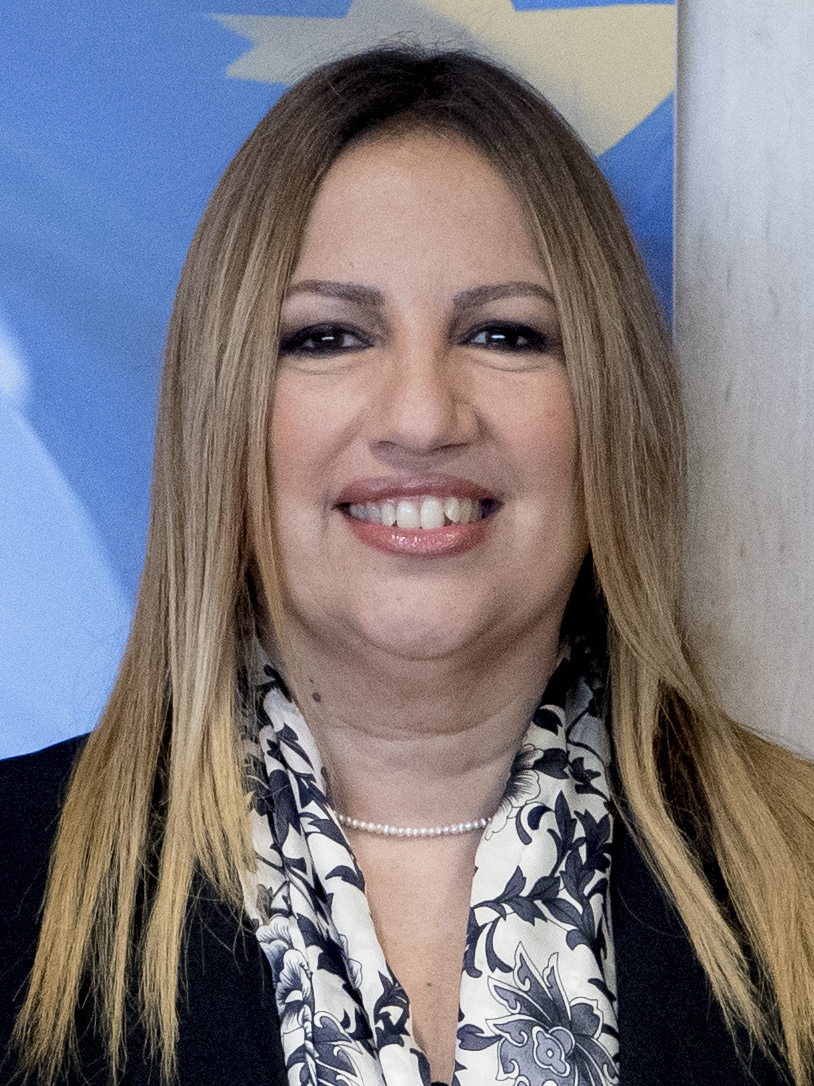

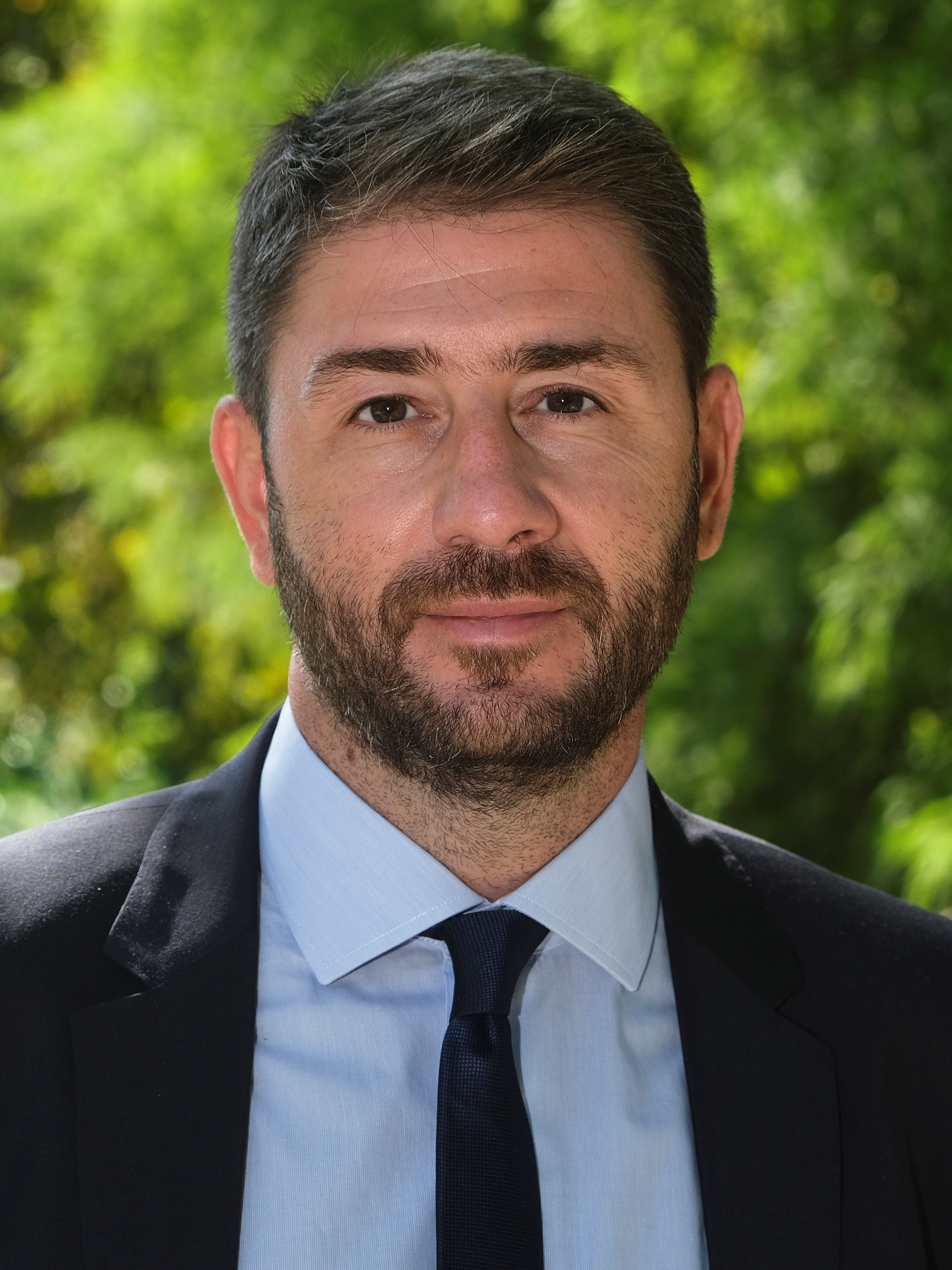

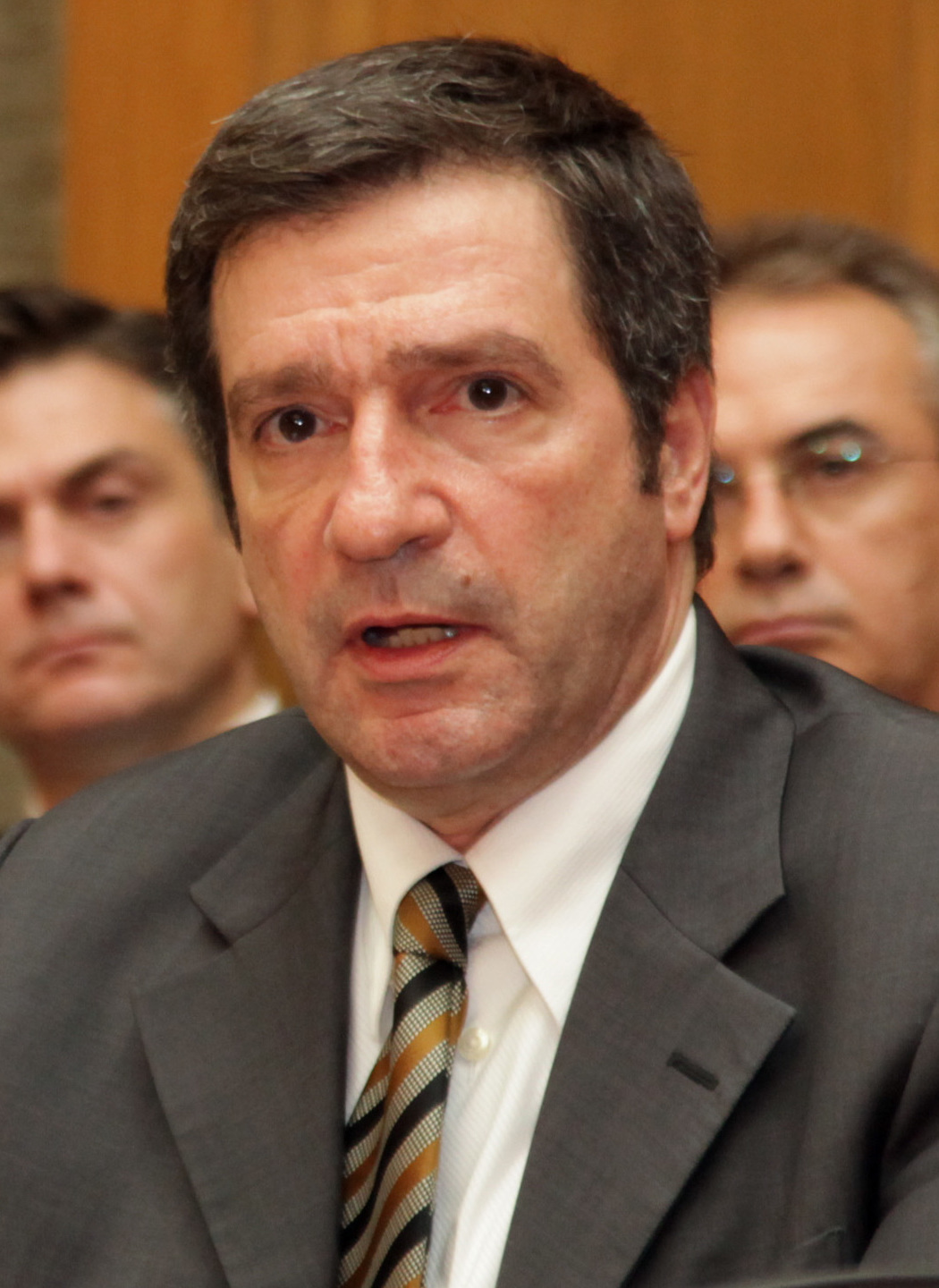

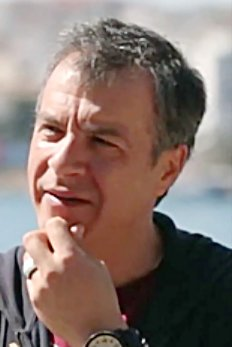
Candidate	Fofi Gennimata	Nikos Androulakis
Party	PASOK	PASOK
Popular vote	86.330 (1st round); 87.230 (2nd round)	51.736 (1st round); 66.483 (2nd round)
Percentage	41.27% (1st round); 56.75% (2nd round)	24.73% (1st round); 43.25% (2nd round)
Candidate	George Kaminis	Stavros Theodorakis
Party	Independent	To Potami
Popular vote	28.581 (1st round)	22.870 (1st round)
Percentage	13.66% (1st round)	10.93% (1st round)
Previous Movement for Change leader
Office established
Movement for Change leader
Fofi Gennimata

A leadership election was held on 12 November and 19 November 2017 by the centre-left political parties of Greece, with the participation of Panhellenic Socialist Movement (PASOK), Greece's main centre-left party and The River (Potami), another parliamentary party. The Movement of Democratic Socialists (KIDISO) and the Union of Democratic National Reform movement (EDEM) also supported the elections. The first round of election was held on 12 November. No candidate gained 50% of the votes, so a runoff vote was held on 19 November. The elections were regulated by an election committee under the presidency of Nikos Alivizatos.

More than 210,000 Greek citizens voted in the first round of elections. Mass media describes the elections as important in the current political situation, and as step for the formation of a new unified party of the centre-left.

== Candidates ==
Nine candidates took part in the elections. In addition to Fofi Gennimata, incumbent leader of PASOK and Potami founder Stavros Theodorakis, the candidates were PASOK MEP Nikos Androulakis, Athens Mayor Giorgos Kaminis, former PASOK ministers Yiannis Maniatis and Yiannis Ragousis, the leader of the EDEM, Apostolos Pontas, the former dean of the Athens University of Economics and Business, Constantinos Gatsios, and Dimitris Tziotis.

Each candidate submitted the 1,000 signatures required for their candidacy to be confirmed.

Odysseas Konstantinopoulos also nominated himself but later retired due to health issues.

== Debates ==
Two televised debates were held for the leadership candidates: The first on 30 October 2017, and the second on 6 November. Both were broadcast live by the national network of the public ERT2.

== Results ==
=== First round ===
Temportary results showed Fofi Gennimata, leader of PASOK to be ahead with 45% of the votes while Androulakis received 24%. On 175,565 votes out of 210,264 total, F. Gennimata received 42.5% while N. Androulakis 25.14%, G. Kaminis 13.52%, S. Theorodakis 9.81%, G. Maniatis 4.26%, G. Ragkousis 2.29%, C. Gatsios 1.65%, A. Pontas 0.53%, D. Tsiotis 0.20%.

The candidates reaching the second-round election were Gennimata, with 44.5% of the vote, and Androulakis, with 25.4%.

=== Run-off ===
The run-off on 19 November was won by Gennimata, who garnered 56% of the vote.

=== Summary ===
Summary of the results of the 2017 Greek centre-left leadership election
Candidates	Party	1st round		2nd round	
Candidates	Party	votes	%	votes	%
Fofi Gennimata	PASOK	86,330	41.27	87,230	56.75
Nikos Androulakis	PASOK	51,736	24.73	66,483	43.25
George Kaminis	Independent	28,581	13.66		
Stavros Theodorakis	To Potami	22,870	10.93		
Giannis Maniatis	PASOK	9,452	4.52		
Giannis Ragousis	Independent	5,084	2.43		
Constantinos Gatsos	Independent	3,579	1.71		
Apostolos Pontas	EDEM	1,131	0.54		
Dimitris Tsiotis	PASOK	412	0.20		
Valid Votes		209,175	99.05	153,713	98.47
Blank/Spoiled Votes		2,016	0.95	2,390	1.53
Total		211,191	100%	156,103	100%
Source: AEDD - 1st Round Results (In Greek), AEDD - 2nd Round Results (In Greek)

== See also ==
- PASOK leadership election (disambiguation)
