= Zoe Konstantopoulou =

Greek politician (born 1976)

- Ζωή Κωνσταντοπούλου
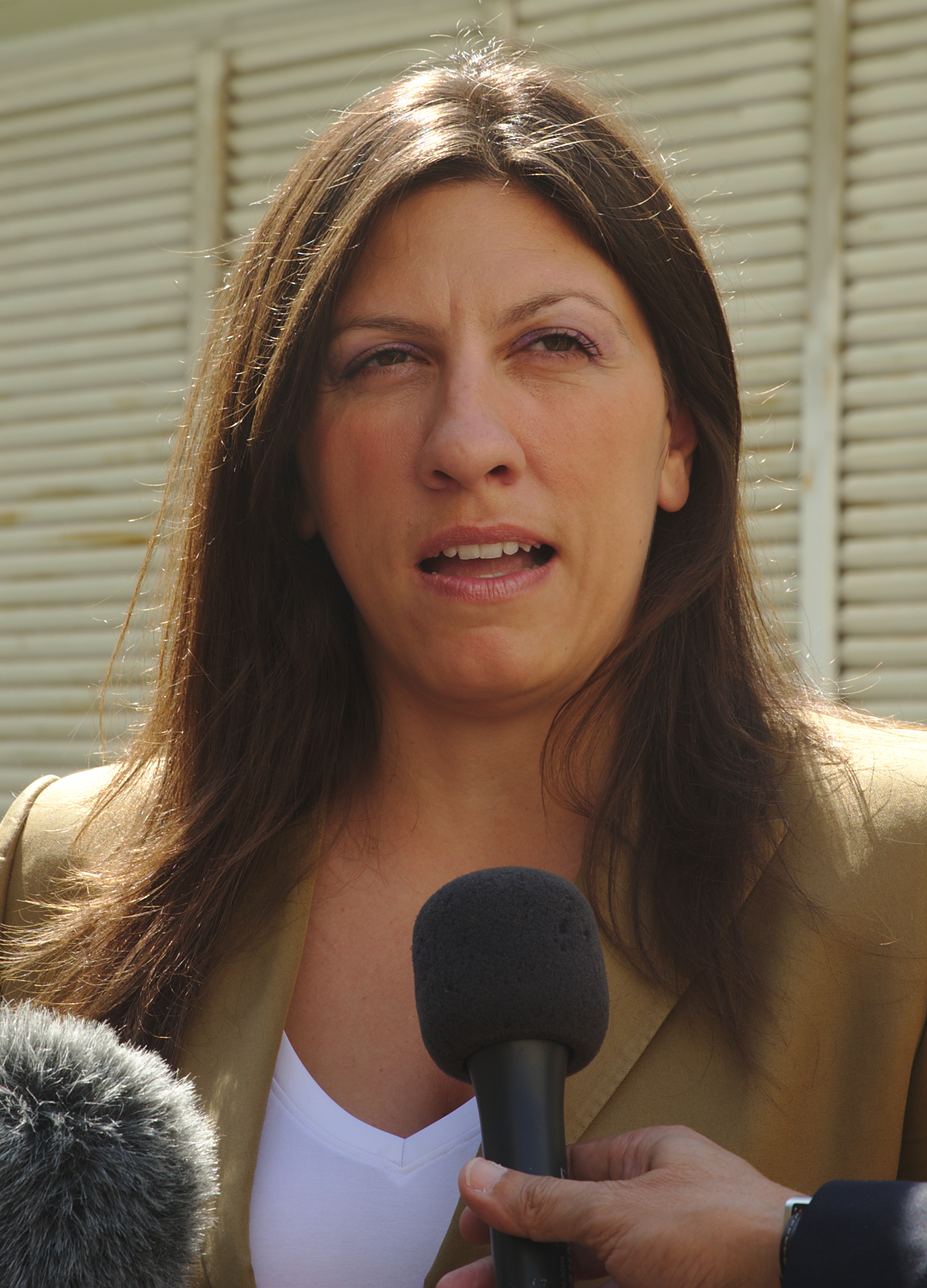
- Konstantopoulou in 2015

President of the Course of Freedom
- Incumbent
- Assumed office 5 July 2016
- Preceded by: Party established

11th Speaker of the Hellenic Parliament
- In office 6 February 2015 – 4 October 2015
- President: Karolos Papoulias; Prokopis Pavlopoulos
- Preceded by: Vangelis Meimarakis
- Succeeded by: Nikos Voutsis
Parliamentary offices
Member of the Hellenic Parliament
Incumbent
Assumed office 3 July 2023
Constituency	Athens B1
In office 6 May 2012 – 28 August 2015
Constituency	Athens A

Personal details
- Born: 8 December 1976 (age 49) Athens, Greece
- Party: Course of Freedom (since 2016)
- Other political affiliations: Popular Unity (2015–2016); Syriza (2012–2015)
- Spouse: Diamantis Karanastasis (m. 2016)
- Parent(s): Nikos Konstantopoulos, Lina Alexiou
- Education: National and Kapodistrian University of Athens; Paris Nanterre University; Pantheon-Sorbonne University; Columbia University
- Profession: Politician; Lawyer
- Website: zoikonstantopoulou.gr

Zoe Konstantopoulou (Greek: Ζωή Κωνσταντοπούλου; born 8 December 1976) is a Greek politician and lawyer who served as Speaker of the Hellenic Parliament from February to October 2015. Since 2016 she serves as the president of the Course of Freedom.

== Life ==
Born on 8 December 1976, in Athens, Konstantopoulou is the daughter of former Synaspismos leader and lawyer Nikos Konstantopoulos and journalist Lina Alexiou. Both her parents were leading figures in Greece's anti-dictatorship struggle.

She is a graduate of the Athens University and Paris Nanterre University law schools. She obtained a DEA at Paris 1 Panthéon-Sorbonne University on European criminal law and criminal policy in Europe and an LL.M. at Columbia Law School with a focus on international law, human rights and criminal law.

As a lawyer, Konstantopoulou was criticized by women's organisations and by the Greek branch of Helsinki Monitor for repeatedly delaying the trial of one of her clients, a rapist, by raising procedural obstacles. Originally to be held in 2006, the man was not finally convicted until 2012. The River leader and MP Stavros Theodorakis regularly taunted Konstantopoulou in parliament about her role in what became known as the "rapist with the tyropita (cheese pies)" scandal. According to Proto Thema, Konstantopoulou switched off Theodorakis's microphone when he was speaking about her role in the scandal in parliament.

== Parliamentary career (2012–2015, 2023–present) ==
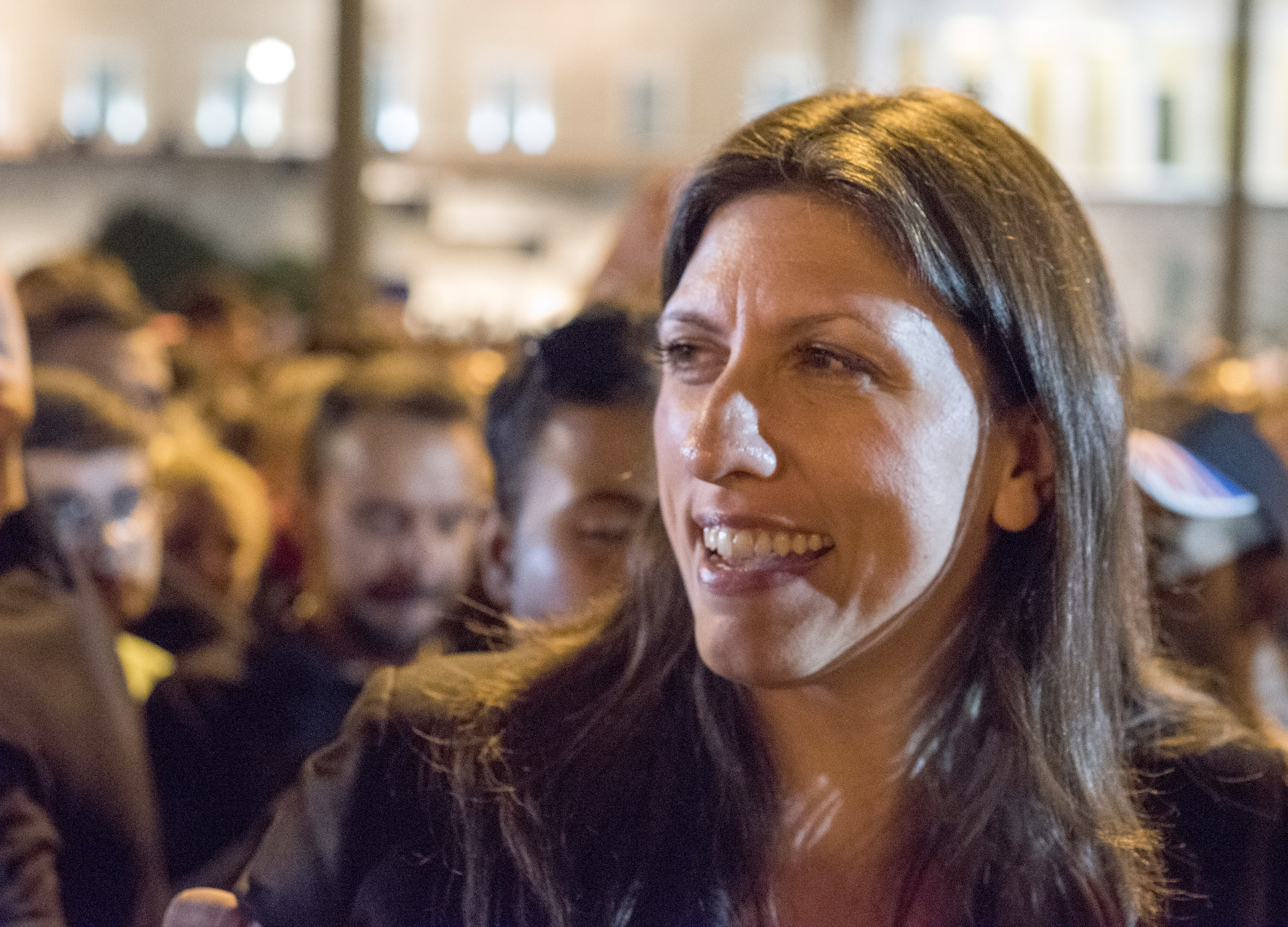
Konstantopoulou in July 2015 after the referendum

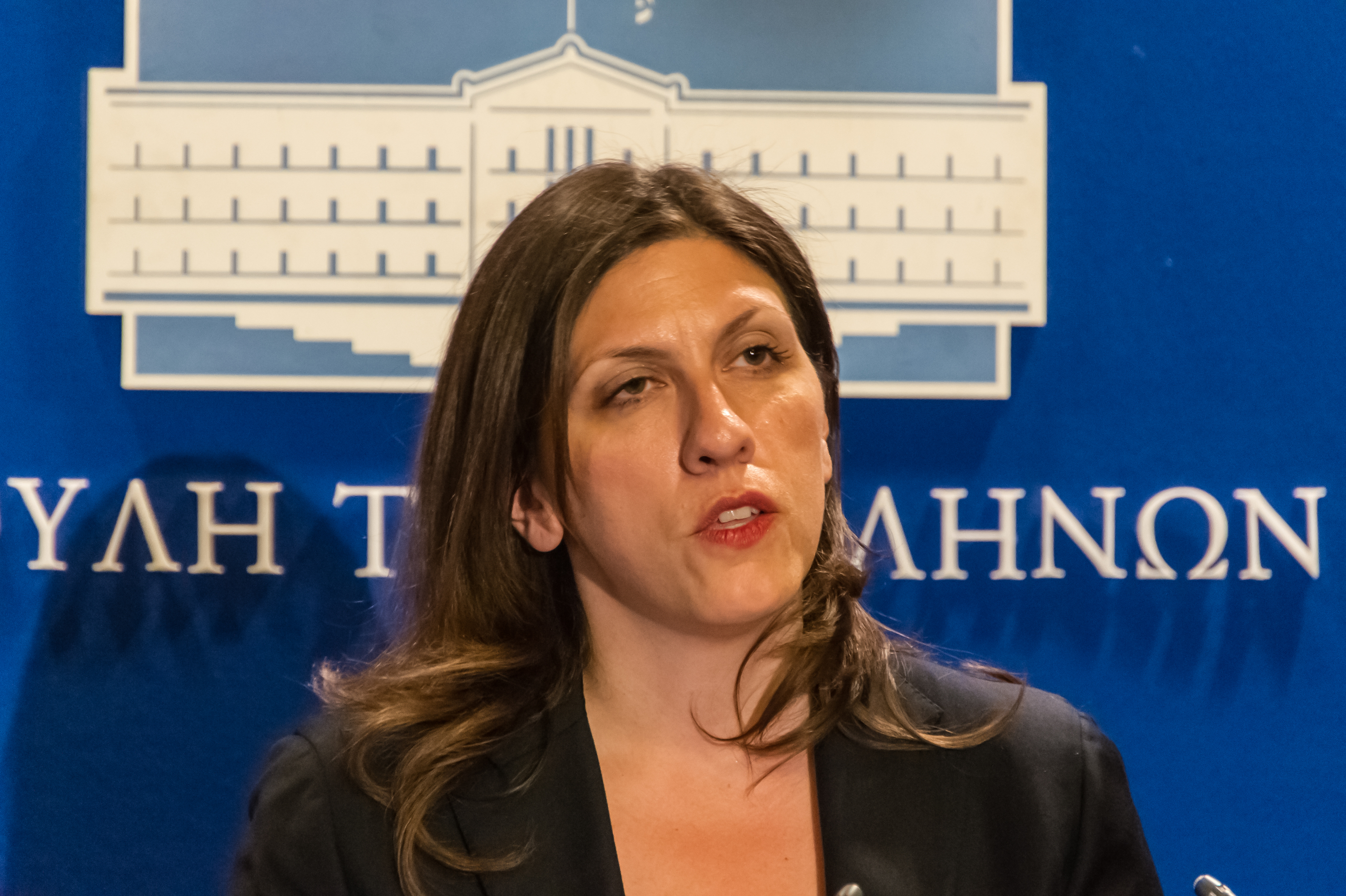
Konstantopoulou in 2015 as Speaker of the Hellenic Parliament

Konstantopoulou was elected to the Greek Parliament on her first attempt in May 2012 as a candidate with Syriza. She was re-elected in the June 2012 and January 2015 elections.

From 2012 to 2014, she was responsible for the justice, transparency and human rights brief for Syriza. She wrote the Black Book of Shame, which lists what Syriza considered political and financial scandals.

On 6 February 2015, she was elected parliamentary speaker, with a record number of 235 out of 300 votes, from her own as well as from the Independent Greeks, The River, PASOK and New Democracy parties.

During her tenure as "firebrand" Speaker of the Greek Parliament, Zoe Konstantopoulou used her office to set up three legal processes: a Greek Debt Truth committee, a committee to oversee Greek war reparations claims against Germany, and a pipeline of high-level corruption cases targeted around public sector contracts with German firms (such as the Siemens scandal and the Lagarde list scandal). After the agreement for the Third Economic Adjustment Programme for Greece by the first government of SYRIZA-ANEL in a U-turn from their anti-austerity identity and pre-election campaign promises, Zoe Konstantopoulou dissociated her views from the party in opposition to this, and raised a number of procedural hurdles to delay the bailout bill when it was brought for approval in the Parliament; voting against it along with rebellious anti-austerity and far-left SYRIZA MPs, she resigned as President of the Hellenic Parliament as part of a breakaway of a nationalist, Eurosceptic, hard left Syriza faction (which contained the pro-Grexit "Left Platform" of Panagiotis Lafazanis) and participated in the following legislative elections as a "collaborative independent" candidate of the pro-drachma Popular Unity party formed from said breakaway faction. However, the party did not manage to achieve the electoral threshold for representation in the legislature.

== Political activity (2015–present) ==
In the summer of 2015, she left Syriza. In the September 2015 Parliamentary Elections, she ran as an MP for Popular Unity but the party narrowly fell short of the parliamentary threshold.

In April 2016, Konstantopoulou launched a new party, Course of Freedom.

In the 2019 and May 2023 general elections, the party came in seventh and eighth place, respectively, but did not manage to enter Parliament. She was elected back to Parliament following the June 2023 elections, with her party winning 8 seats. In the 2024 EU elections the party raised its percentage from the previous EU election and slightly from the 2023 June election; electing one MEP (Maria Zacharia).

Political offices
Preceded by Vangelis Meimarakis	Speaker of the Hellenic Parliament; 2015	Succeeded by Nikos Voutsis
Order of precedence
Preceded by Dimitris Natsios as President of Democratic Patriotic Movement – Victory	Order of precedence of Greece; President of the Course of Freedom	Succeeded by Vasilis Stigkas as President of Spartans
