= Course of Freedom =

Political party in Greece

Course of Freedom Πλεύση Ελευθερίας
- President: Zoe Konstantopoulou
- Founder: Zoe Konstantopoulou
- Founded: 19 April 2016; 10 years ago
- Split from: Popular Unity
- Ideology: Left-wing nationalism Sovereigntism; Anti-austerity; Left-wing populism Progressivism; Hard Euroscepticism
- Political position: Left-wing to far-left
- European Parliament group: Non-Inscrits
- Colours: Purple; Turquoise
- Slogan: "We look neither right nor left. We look forward." "We will change the world with Love"
- Parliament: 5 / 300
- European Parliament: 1 / 21

Website
- plefsieleftherias.gr

Course of Freedom (Greek: Πλεύση Ελευθερίας, romanized: Plefsi Eleftherias) is a Greek anti-establishment political party founded in 2016 by the former President of the Hellenic Parliament, Zoe Konstantopoulou.

== History ==
On 19 April 2016, Zoe Konstantopoulou announced the founding of Course of Freedom. According to its founding declaration, the party's purpose of action consists of democracy, justice, transparency, rights, debt cancellation, and claim for World War II reparations.

Konstantopoulou, along with the party, had attended and called for support of the "Macedonia name" anti-Prespa Agreement mass protests of 2018 and 2019, with the slogan "I'm not ceding my homeland".

The party cooperates electorally with the I Don't Pay Movement, whose leaders were included in Course of Freedom's ballot to run in the European and Greek national elections of 2019.

Course of Freedom was able to enter the Hellenic Parliament at the June 2023 legislative election, scoring 3.17% and electing 8 members of Parliament.

The party condemned attacks on health facilities during the Gaza war after party president Konstantopoulou met with the Palestinian envoy, expressing her support for the Palestinian people; she vowed that Course of Freedom will "be the voice" of Palestine in Greece.

In the 2024 European election the party was able to elect one MEP, Maria Zacharia, who is a trade unionist and labourist.

Course of Freedom had a sitting Greek MP, Georgia Kefala, that participated in the March to Gaza and joined in the travel to Egypt.

In 2025, as part of its political program, the party put out a call for organizing a Constitutional convention through participatory means. Konstantopoulou called for adopting "a new Constitution of the 21st century" that will enshrine popular democracy and wipe all privileges for political personnel.

== Ideology ==
Course of Freedom was established on an anti-memoranda ideology, based on its founder's Zoe Konstantopoulou's hardliner opposition to austerity, neoliberalism, "tax inequality", Greece's creditors, and the Troika, and has been seen as "left-wing populist". Mattia Zulianello, the professor of political science at the University of Trieste, also classified the party as left-wing populist. The party has been described by political commentators as left-wing, "nominally left", or far-left, although Konstantopoulou describes it as anti-establishment and "neither left nor right" instead. The party's political position has also been considered to be "catch-all", accruing support from both left-wing and right-wing voters, including a component from the far-right, owing to its generalized anti-establishment positions. Course of Freedom is considered to be a sovereignist party and appeals to nationalist sentiments, and has been labelled as "nationalist left" or left-wing nationalist.

Course of Freedom's political position has also been evaluated as solely anti-establishment or simply populist "anti-systemic", considered difficult to be firmly placed on the political spectrum or transcending it due to its anti-corruption message. It is considered to be a radical formation, espousing a virulent rejection of all politicians while still embracing legalism and institutionalism.

Konstantopoulou has criticized privatizations, taxation increases, "media oligarchs", and auctioning off and bank seizures of homes of overindebted families and electronic auctions. The party has also come in support of refugees, the LGBT community, opponents to COVID-19 vaccination, and of victims of sexism and sexual violence.

Course of Freedom is a hard Eurosceptic party, with Konstantopoulou calling the European Union a "monstrous creation" lacking in democracy that is "not a union to belong to"; the party's founding declaration denounces "Eurobureaucracy" as totalitarianism. The party also believes the euro is "against the people", with Konstantopoulou calling it a "tool of enslavement and oppression".

Konstantopoulou and the party have also launched a "Don't Pay" movement and a campaign of "general disobedience" towards debts, taxes and insurance contributions since 2017.

=== Positions ===
The party's positions include the cancellation of the country's national debt (that Zoe Konstantopoulou has previously during her time in government affirmed as "illegal, illegitimate, odious", "unsustainable" and "unconstitutional" based on the report of the Hellenic Parliament's Greek Debt Truth Commission), opposition to the Prespa naming agreement on North Macedonia's name and calling for a referendum on it, claiming German war reparations and loans of up to €350 billion, additional compensation for Nazi atrocities, expanding Greece's territorial waters to 10 km, and opposition to mandatory vaccination.

The party's program includes confiscation of property of bankers and politicians who will be deemed responsible for the country's inclusion in the Memoranda, and also shutting down all media accused of "propaganda and entanglement" and doing away with the riot control known as MAT, replacing the last two with citizen collaboration/participation alternatives.

Course of Freedom openly impugnes the euro and the Eurozone, and is in favour of monetary sovereignty, with Konstantopoulou stating a clear "no" to the euro; Course of Freedom wants currency to function as a "tool of liberty" irrespective of whether its form will be electronic, digital or drachma. Konstantopoulou has simultaneously stated that she doesn't believe "drachma is a panacea" and that no currency alone can guarantee democracy and freedom. Course of Freedom is also in favour of alternative currencies and alternative means of payment and transactions, as a means to counter "monetary blackmail" and "the control of the banking system" In 2025, Konstantopoulou stated that she has never advocated for a return to the drachma, that no currency is "sacred" or "a panacea" and reiterated her position in favour of sovereignty and against "monetary blackmail", admonishing against currency restrictions and linking them to the events of 2015, believing that the country shouldn't be "blackmailed" into using any currency. She reiterated Course of Freedom's position in using digital currency as an alternative option to defend against "someone cutting off" liquidity.

Its founding declaration supports positions of popular democracy and participatory democracy, and includes proposals like the institutionalization of mandatory referendums, citizen participation in the justice system, renationalization of all public enterprises and public assets, the dissolution of the HRADF S.A, and an accountancy audit of Greek debt, insurance funds and state-owned institutions.

Ιn 2025, Konstantopoulou unveiled the party's program with a renewed focus on direct and participatory democracy, humanism, accountability and popular sovereignty. It includes proposals like enabling social legislative initiatives, enshrining referendums for all "major" issues and requiring popular verdict, turning the parliament into a "Live, Open Parliament" and allowing public participation in the parliamentary process, forbidding legislation from being voted without prior proven and timely notification of society and without substantial prior public consultation (both online and in-person through hearings in the Parliament), obligatory "Open Hearings" of stakeholders and citizens for all legislative bills of "big social importance" and making it obligatory for the government and the parliament to answer to the questions of stakeholders, preventing "irrelevant" amendments from being inserted into legislation, requiring all Ministers to show up once a week and answer questions from members of parliament and citizens, allowing citizens to participate through sortition in the parliamentary audit, and outlining constitutional amendments for abolishing the appointment of the heads of Justice by the executive branch and ending all parliamentary and ministerial immunities. It also includes the proposal to abolish the age limit for election (currently at 25) and match it with the voting age, allowing people between 17 and 25 years of age to be elected as members of parliament.

Konstantopoulou proposed the abolition of all funds in Greece, believing their nature to be predatory and lacking in constitutional legitimacy. The party has also called for taking back public funds that were directed to banks and for the strictest taxation of their excess profits.

Course of Freedom has supported and voted in favour of legalising same-sex marriage. It has also supported criminalizing femicide as a separate crime with special characteristics, and has proposed the creation of an official body to record femicides.

The party is pro-Palestinian. It supports a two-state solution and supports Palestinian statehood, wanting the Greek government to start internationally recognizing Palestine.

== Composition ==
=== Participating partners ===
Τhe following members are nationally affiliated by running in elections using Course of Freedom's ballot:

Party	Ideology	Position
I Don't Pay Movement; Κίνημα Δεν Πληρώνω (κόμμα)	Activism; Anti-austerity; Civil Disobedience; Anti-neoliberalism; Euroscepticism; Grassroots democracy	Far-left

== Election results ==
=== Hellenic Parliament ===
Election	Hellenic Parliament					Rank	Government	Leader
Election	Votes	%	±pp	Seats won	+/−	Rank	Government	Leader
2019	82,673	1.5%	New	0 / 300	New	8th	Extra-parliamentary	Zoe Konstantopoulou
May 2023	170,298	2.9%	+1.4	0 / 300	0	7th	Extra-parliamentary	Zoe Konstantopoulou
Jun 2023	165,210	3.2%	+0.3	8 / 300	▲8	8th	Opposition	Zoe Konstantopoulou

=== European Parliament ===
European Parliament
Election	Votes	%	±pp	Seats won	+/−	Rank	Leader	EP Group
2019	81,269	1.61%	New	0 / 21	New	8th	Zoe Konstantopoulou	−
2024	135,310	3.40%	+1.79	1 / 21	▲1	7th	Zoe Konstantopoulou	NI
