= Global Risks Report =

Publication of the World Economic Forum

The Risks Report is published by the World Economic Forum ahead of the Forum's Annual Meeting in Davos, Switzerland. Based on the work of the Global Risk Network, the report describes changes occurring in the global risks landscape from year to year. The report also explores the interconnectedness of risks, and considers how the strategies for the mitigation of global risks might be structured.

Sources for the report include an assessment by several major insurance and reinsurance companies and focus workshops, interviews and a survey of internationally recognised experts. The report is intended to raise awareness about the need for a multi-stakeholder approach to the mitigation of global risk.

== By year ==
=== 2026 ===
The Global Risks Report 2026 was released on 14th Jan 2026. The report analyses global risks through three timeframes to support decision-makers in balancing current crises and longer-term priorities. The report examines global risks across three distinct time horizons, providing a structured framework to assist decision-makers in balancing immediate crises with longer-term strategic priorities. Subsequent industry analyses, including commentary published by Swiss GRC, have emphasized the importance of integrating enterprise risk management frameworks to address interconnected and systemic global risks.

=== 2025 ===
The Global Risks Report 2025 was released on 15th Jan 2025. The report presents the findings of the Global Risks Perception Survey 2024-2025 (GRPS), which captures insights from over 900 experts worldwide.

=== 2024 ===
The Global Risks Report 2024 was released on 10th Jan 2024. The report explores some of the most severe risks we may face over the next decade, against a backdrop of rapid technological change, economic uncertainty, a warming planet and conflict.

=== 2023 ===
The Global Risks Report 2023 was released on 11th Jan 2023. The report lists cost of living crisis as the top global risk in the short term while failure to mitigate climate change is the top concern for the long term.

=== 2020 ===
The Global Risks Report 2020 highlights environmental pressures more than any of its predecessors. The report identifies five of the top five risks by likelihood and four of the top five by impact as environmental risks (if "water crisis" is also counted as an environmental risk, rather than a "societal risk" as classified in the report). The only non-environmental risk among the top five likely and top five impactful was "weapons of mass destruction". Pandemics did not receive a top spot in 2020, but were given one in the 2021 report. Pandemics could also be qualified as an environmental risks given the zoogenic nature of COVID-19.

=== 2019 ===
The Global Risks Report 2019 highlights environmental concerns, which "accounted for three of the top five risks by likelihood and four by impact". The second area of concern was the risk of data fraud and cyberattacks.

=== 2018 ===
The Global Risks Report 2018 highlights four concerns: (1) persistent inequality and unfairness, (2) domestic and international political tensions, (3) environmental dangers and (4) cyber-vulnerabilities. One recurring theme is humanity's inadequate competence in dealing with complex systems and the danger of complacency. The report was edited by Margareta Drzeniek Hanouz.

=== 2009 ===
The Global Risks Report 2009 identifies deteriorating fiscal positions, a hard landing in China, a collapse in asset prices, gaps in global governance and issues relating to natural resources and climate as the pivotal risks facing the world this year. While Global Risks 2008 highlighted food security, systemic financial risk and supply chain risk as areas of focus for the short term, Global Risks 2009 focuses on the impact of the 2008 financial crisis on levels of economic risk and its implications for other risk areas. The 2009 report stresses the importance of considering the long-term implications of many of the decisions taken today in response to immediate financial and economic challenges. The report also explores how the lack of effective global governance was a factor in the 2008 financial crisis and could potentially exacerbate a number of other global risks if not properly addressed.

== Global risk ==
The particularity of this Global Risks report is that it considers risks that are global in their nature and impact, such that they would have a widespread impact should they play out. The criteria for what constitutes a global risk have been set as follows:

- Global scope: To be considered global, a risk should have the potential to affect (including both primary and secondary impact) at least three world regions in at least two different continents. While these risks may have regional or even local origin, their impact can potentially be felt globally.
- Cross-industry relevance: The risk has to affect three or more industries (including both primary and secondary impact).
- Uncertainty: There is uncertainty about how the risk manifests itself within ten years combined with uncertainty about the magnitude of its impact (assessed in terms of likelihood and severity).
- Economic impact: The risk has the potential to cause economic damage of at 10 billion US$ or more; and/or Public Impact: The risk has the potential to cause major human suffering and to trigger considerable public pressure and global policy responses.
- Multi-stakeholder approach: The risk's complexity both in terms of its effects and its drivers as well as its inter-linkages with other risks require a multi-stakeholder approach for its mitigation.

== The Global Risk Network ==
The Global Risk Network was established in 2004 and tracks the evolution of a set of risks in five areas over a ten year time frame. The five areas are: Economics, Geopolitics, Environment, Society, Technology. In 2009, the set of risks totaled 36, up from 31 in the 2008 taxonomy. Each year, the risk set is assessed using quantitative and qualitative means in terms of likelihood and severity to come up with a 'Risk Landscape' of risks to watch in the short to medium term. These include high likelihood and high severity risks, but also low likelihood and high severity risks that constitute 'outliers' whose impact would be significant in the unlikely event they would occur. The Global Risk Network also publishes a selection of regional and topical reports each year. Its latest publications include: India@Risk 2008, Europe@Risk 2008, Global Growth@Risk 2008, and Africa@Risk 2008.
