= United for Change =

United for Change may refer to the following political parties:

- United for Change (Lesotho), founded by 'Malichaba Lekhoaba in 2020
- United for Change (United Kingdom), active 2018–2021

== See also ==
- Unite for Change, a South African political party
