= Spyros Lykoudis =

Greek politician

- Born: 1945 (age 80–81); Metaxourghio, Athens
- Occupation: Politician

Spyros Lykoudis

Member of the [[6th Vice-President of the Greek Parliament Parliament]] for 1st constituency of Athens
- Incumbent
- Assumed office January 26, 2015
- Incumbent
- Assumed office February 5, 2015

Spyros Lykoudis (born 1945), a Greek politician, has been a political activist of the Renewing Left for five decades. He was elected a Member of the Hellenic National Parliament with the Democratic Left (DIMAR), assuming office on May 27, 2012, in the 2012 elections. He declared his independence from the Democratic Left in September 2014 and in October 2014 he constituted the Reformers for Democracy and Development.

== Career ==
He was the Secretary of the first Central Committee of the Democratic Left and in the elections 2012 he was elected a State Member of the Hellenic Parliament. In June 2013 the Democratic Left (DIMAR) broke away from the coalition government, which signified a change of the political course of the party. Spyros Lykoudis disagreed in public with the way, the time and the triggering event of the departure. In September 2014 he declared his independence from DIMAR in Parliament. On 21 October 2014 he presented his new political initiative, the Reformers for Democracy and Development in a public event in the Benaki Museum.

On 24 December 2014 the cooperation of the Reformers with the political party The River (To Potani) was announced in a joint press conference with its Leader Stavros Theodorakis in the Old Parliament. Spyros Lykoudis represents the 1st constituency of Athens as an MP, elected in the 25th January 2015 general elections by The River (To Potami).

(1) (2) http://spyroslykoudis.gr (3) {http://topotami.gr} (4) http://hellenicparliament.gr
