= Public pensions in Greece =

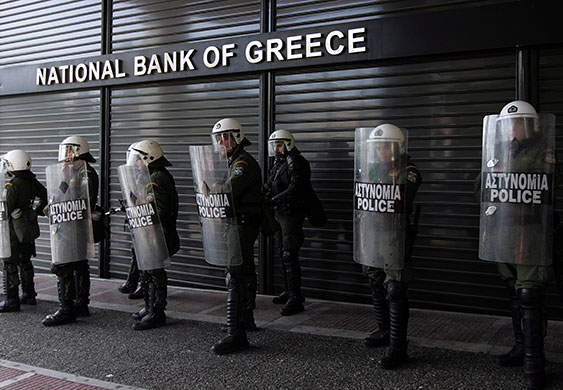
Greek police guard the National Bank of Greece during the imposition of capital controls

Public pensions in Greece are designed to provide incomes to Greek pensioners upon reaching retirement. For decades pensions in Greece were known to be among the most generous in the European Union, allowing many pensioners to retire earlier than pensioners in other European countries. This placed a heavy burden on Greece's public finances which, coupled with an aging workforce, made the Greek state increasingly vulnerable to external economic shocks, culminating in a recession due to the 2008 financial crisis and subsequent European debt crisis. This series of crises has forced the Greek government to implement economic reforms aimed at restructuring the pension system and eliminating inefficiencies within it. Measures in the Greek austerity packages imposed upon Greek citizens by the European Central Bank have achieved some success at reforming the pension system despite having stark ramifications for standards of living in Greece, which have seen a sharp decline since the beginning of the crisis.

In proportion to their respective GDPs, the Greek government has historically spent more on their pension system than other European countries. In 2014, Greece spent around fourteen billion euros from the state budget on the pension system. This amount accounts for 7 (or so) percent of its annual GDP. Despite the increased levels of government spending on the pension policy, Greek workers were still expected to heavily contribute to their pensions. The combination of government involvement and worker contributions created a Bismarckian welfare state in which the focus was on income maintenance based on employee and employer contribution (instead of poverty prevention). The mixture of economic crisis and inefficient social redistribution concentrated on pensions has decimated Greece's ability to pursue other forms of social insurance. Greece spends 2% of its GDP on benefits such as housing, family, and poverty relief, signifying that the Greek government spends around 3.5 times more on the public pension system than on other forms of welfare and social insurance. Furthermore, a significant portion of the Greek population relies on their pensions as the main form of income for their family. As of 2017, nearly one in two families in Greece stated that the money from pensions is the dominant source of salary.

While Greece has historically given generous pensions at early retirement ages compared to the European average, it has also historically suffered from unequal distribution of pensions and social benefits with already well-paid workers having a major advantage. Before the economic crisis, in 2008, social wealth redistribution mostly benefited pensioners and social insurance programs while low-income families received less than 10% of available cash benefits. Given that the 2010 pension reforms placed additional financial burden on impoverished and aging demographics, the full scope of the reforms could not be implemented due to the fear of further exclusion and impoverishment. Greece's pension reform in 2016 was partially intended to address these issues, and some analysts predict that it has opened the door to further reforms in the near future.

== The primary pension scheme ==
Public pensions in Greece are provided by public funds and pensioner's contributions during working years. Benefits are determined by a combination of factors: number of years worked (via contributions), and years of residency in Greece. The primary pension scheme consists of two components: a contributory component and a more supplemental residency-based component.

The first component of the scheme is funded entirely by pensioner's contributions. It incentivizes longer periods of contribution by providing higher accrual rates (the rate at which the pension accumulates annually) to pensioners who have worked for longer stretches of time. Pensioners with fifteen years or less worth of contributions only receive their pensions with an accrual rate of 0.77%, thus collecting less when reaching retirement age. This rate increases progressively based on the number of years worked to a maximum of 2% for those who have contributed a minimum of 40 years. These pensioners are rewarded by being able to retire at the minimum retirement age of 62 while collecting their pensions at the maximum aforementioned rate of 2%, instead of collecting full pension benefits at the normal retirement age of 67.

The other component is a state funded national pension based on years of residency. Pension amounts are determined by number of years of residency from age fifteen to the minimum age permitted to receive the pension (age 62). A maximum monthly payment amount of €384 is allocated to pensioners with forty years of residency and with a contribution history of twenty years. A minimum monthly payment of €345.50 is allocated to pensioners with a history of fifteen years of contributions. A 2% reduction (2% per year under 20 years spent contributing) to the maximum payment is applied to pensions collected by pensioners with histories between fifteen and twenty years spent contributing.

=== Historical rates ===
Prior to 2010, most employees had a contribution rate of 6.67%, while employers contributed 13.33% (double the employee rate), with a higher rate for hazardous occupations. As of 2016 when the Greek government reformed the pension scheme, the self-employed sector and other white-collar sectors have had their respective contribution rates equalized and unified, standing at 20% of their annual income (regardless of assumed earnings).

== European influences ==
European influences and domestic politics have both played a significant role in the welfare state reforms that have taken place in Greece over the past twenty five years. Although private interests and bureaucratic mechanisms have opposed widespread reform in the welfare system, the influence of the EU has been pervasive encompassing policies including social assistance and public pensions. Greece suffered from high public debt and deficit which it was unable to overcome despite strong economic growth in the years preceding the debt crisis. Funding the Greek government's budget and its deficits created a strong need for borrowing in international markets and Greece entered a Memorandum of Understanding with its prospective lenders, leading to the implementation of reforms sought by the European Commission, European Central Bank, and International Monetary Fund. The adoption of austerity measures and pro-market reforms created significant challenges to Greece's economy which economists have described as a 'political economy of generalized insecurity'. The impact these reforms have had on an already fragile familistic welfare capitalist economy has only deepened the European sovereign debt crisis.

With the Economy overwhelmed by a deficit of over 15%, Greece turned to its European allies for help, and was able to secure 110 billion euros. Although the government faced criticism for its decision to adopt the austerity measures, without the recommended economic reforms, particularly spending cuts and reforms to social welfare programs including public pensions, it was feared that Greece lacked the ability to repay these loans and would soon be in a similar or worse economic position, unable to fund its government. The effect of these reforms on pensions including raising the contribution rate of Greek pensioners and changing the eligibility age to collect pensions. The economic benefits of these changes included slowing the rise of the pension system's elderly dependency rate and reducing the number of years that retirees collect pensions, a strategy designed to successfully address the shrinking labor force problem. Greek economists and their European and international partners predicted a short recessionary period as a result of these adjustments, followed by a period of sustained economic growth. The effectiveness of these adjustments to the public pension system is still contested, although it is argued that their failure to achieve projected growth is a result of systematic weaknesses in the Greek economy as opposed to measures’ efficacy.

== Effects on the Greek population ==
The public pension system (and the austerity packages that have resulted from the pension scheme) have taken a heavy toll on the population of Greece overall. The continuous cuts of the pension system and the decreasing GDP has devastated the population of pensioners, with an estimated 1.5 million pensioners falling below the poverty threshold and a total income loss of 70%. Moreover, the calls for balancing the budgets and deficits through austerity cuts has led to decreases in the budget for other crucial social programs. With the Greek government focusing on funding the pension scheme, programs such as healthcare, unemployment benefits, and education have suffered. In terms of healthcare, Greece's budget for public hospitals was slashed by 25% between the years of 2009 and 2011, leaving up to 1 million citizens without access to sufficient healthcare. The Greek government has also been unable to provide unemployment benefits and opportunities for the unemployed to re-integrate into the workforce, as studies show nine out of ten unemployed Greek workers fail to receive unemployment benefits, with 74% of the unemployed remaining without work for a minimum of 12 months. Education (both primary and secondary) has felt the weight of the focus on pensions and austerity as well, creating a lack of skilled workers for the Greek economy. After accounting for inflation, the education system in Greece has faced similar budget cuts as the healthcare system, ranging from 20 to 25% (as of 2011). All of these budget cuts have led to Greece's score of Subjective Well-Being falling a total of one point over the past decade on OECD's scale (ranked 0 to 10); a sharper decrease than any other OECD country.

== See also ==
- Greek austerity packages
- Economy of Greece
- Greek government-debt crisis
- Greek government-debt crisis countermeasures
