= Involvement =

Involvement may refer to:

Synonyms

- Social:
  - Engagement (disambiguation)
  - Participation (disambiguation)
  - Stakeholder (disambiguation)
- Involution (disambiguation)

Specific senses

- "Involvement", 1980 episode of television series The Professionals
- Goal involvement, statistic in association football

== See also ==
- Involve (disambiguation)
- Parental involvement, require that one or more parents consent to or be notified before their minor child can legally engage in certain activities
- Patient and public involvement, medical research term, distinguished from participation
- Private sector involvement, the forced contribution of private sector creditors to a financial crisis resolution process
