= Methymna (Crete) =

Methymna or Methymne (Ancient Greek: Μηθύμνη) was a city in ancient Crete, near Rhocca, which Aelian mentions in connection with a curious story respecting a remedy for hydrophobia discovered by a Cretan fisherman. Writing in the 19th century, Robert Pashley considered that the remains near the chapel of Aghios Georghos, by Nopia, on the extreme eastern edge of the plain of Kastelli Kissamou, represent Methymna. In the modern day, the village of Drapanias is considered to be a potential site of the city, and the municipal unit of Mithymna, which encompasses it, is named after the site.
