= PASOK leadership election =

PASOK leadership election may refer to:

- 2007 PASOK leadership election
- 2012 PASOK leadership election
- 2015 PASOK leadership election

== See also ==
- 2017 Greek centre-left leadership election
- 2021 KINAL leadership election
- 2024 PASOK – KINAL leadership election
