= Involve =

Involve may refer to:

- Involve: A Journal of Mathematics

== See also ==
- Involvement (disambiguation)
