= Reformers for Democracy and Development =

Reformers for Democracy and Development Μεταρρυθμιστές για τη Δημοκρατία και την Ανάπτυξη
- Leader: Spyros Lykoudis
- Founded: 21 October 2014
- Dissolved: 18 March 2019
- Split from: Democratic Left
- Merged into: Movement for Change
- Ideology: Social democracy
- Political position: Centre-left
- National affiliation: To Potami
- European affiliation: None
- European Parliament group: No MEPs
- International affiliation: None
- Parliament: 1 / 300

Website
- metarrythmistes.gr

The Reformers for Democracy and Development (Greek: Μεταρρυθμιστές της Αριστεράς για τη Δημοκρατία και την Ανάπτυξη) was a Greek political movement founded on 21 October 2014 by Spyros Lykoudis, who, at the time was a State Deputy and a member of the Democratic Left (a Greek political party). The movement became independent from the party on 19 September 2014.

The foundation of the movement was announced on 21 October 2014 at an event held at the Benaki Museum. On 29 November 2014, the first nationwide congregation of the movement was held in the auditorium of the radio station "Athens 9.84" in Technopolis of Athens and welcomed, among others, Greek personages such as John Ragkousis, Pantelis Kapsis, Vassilis Oikonomou and Nikos Mouzelis. A Panhellenic Council was also elected on the day.
