= Mythimna =

Mythimna Μύθημνα
- Municipal unit
- Location within the regional unit

- Location within Greece
- Coordinates: 35°29′N 23°42′E
- Country: Greece
- Administrative region: Crete
- Regional unit: Chania
- Municipality: Kissamos

Area
  - Municipal unit: 55.3 km^{2} (21.4 sq mi)

Population (2021)
  - Municipal unit: 2,116
  - Municipal unit density: 38.3/km^{2} (99.1/sq mi)
- Time zone: UTC+2 (EET)
  - Summer (DST): UTC+3 (EEST)
- Postal code: 734 00
- Area code: 28220
- Vehicle registration: ΧΝ, XB
- Website: Mythimna Website

Mythimna (Greek: Μύθημνα, Δήμος Μυθήμνης) is a former municipality in the Chania regional unit, Crete, Greece. Since the 2011 local government reform it is part of the municipality Kissamos, of which it is a municipal unit. The municipal unit has an area of 55.268 km^{2} (21.339 sq mi). It was part of the former Kissamos province which covered the north west of Chania Prefecture.

The municipal unit of Mythimna extends from the north coast to the foothills of the White Mountains (Lefka Ori). The seat of the municipality was Drapanias.

== See also ==
- List of communities of Chania
