= Stakeholder =

Stakeholder may refer to:

- Stakeholder (corporate), a group, corporate, organization, member, or system that affects or can be affected by an organization's actions
- Project stakeholder, a person, group, or organization with an interest in a project

== See also ==
- Stakeholder analysis, the process of identifying those affected by a project or event
- Stakeholder approach
- Stakeholder engagement
- Stakeholder management
- Stakeholder theory, a theory that identifies and models the groups that are stakeholders of a project or corporation
- Escrow
- Multistakeholder governance
- Organizational stakeholders
