= Greece and the International Monetary Fund =

Greece is one of the original members of the International Monetary Fund, joining it on 27 December 1945. It has a quota of 2,428.90 million SDRs and 25,754 votes, 0.51% of the total IMF quota and votes. Greece has been represented on the IMF Board of Governors by Minister of Finance Christos Staikouras since 2019. Greece elects an Executive Director on the fund's Executive Board with Albania, Italy, Malta, Portugal and San Marino. Michail Psalidopoulos is the elected alternate director. Greece has signed two loan agreements with the IMF: a Stand-By Arrangement from 2010 to 2012 and an agreement under the Extended Fund Facility from 2012 to 2016, borrowing a total of 27,766.3 million SDR. In 2019 Greece owed the IMF 6,735.64 million SDR, and was at that time the fund's third-largest borrower (after Argentina and Ukraine). In 2018, the fund began conducting annual post-program monitoring of Greece in addition to its annual Article IV consultation. Nonetheless, repayment of Greece’s loans to the International Monetary Fund was completed two years ahead of schedule in 2022.

== Background ==
During the early 2000s, after the adoption of the euro, Greece obtained easier access to financial markets and experienced an economic boom. Indeed, Fitch upgraded Greece from BBB+ (March 2000) to A+ (October 2003). It developed an economy based on large deficits and high debt levels which were vulnerable to a halt in private-capital flow. At the beginning of the Great Recession in 2009, Greece had a public debt of 135.4 percent of gross domestic product (GDP) and a public expenditure of 54.08 percent of GDP. That year, new prime minister George Papandreou announced a 15.5-percent revision of the public deficit. Earlier data about public debt and deficit had been masked by former governments with the help of Goldman Sachs. Global markets began selling Greek bonds, and Fitch and S&P Global Ratings downgraded Greece to BBB+ with a negative watch. The country could no longer access the global market, and sought help from European institutions and the International Monetary Fund.

== Loan agreements ==
=== Stand-By Arrangement (2010-2012) ===
On 3 May 2010, the Greek government asked the IMF for a Stand-By Arrangement. The SBA was approved six days later by the Executive Board of the IMF using its Emergency Financing Mechanism. The SBA totaled 26.4 billion SDR, with 4.8 billion immediately available. The arrangement aimed to improve competitiveness and investment (making Greece an export-led growth model) and suppress domestic demand with wage and benefit cuts. The state would have a minor role in the economy, and a Financial Stability Fund (FSF) would be created. Improved market confidence and growth was expected.

On 5 August, after a visit to Athens, the European troika (the IMF, the European Central Bank and the European Commission) expressed satisfaction with the government's implementation of the program. According to the troika, the program "has made a strong start" with implementation in fiscal policy (the government "kept spending below the budget limit at the state level"), the financial sector (the FSF "will soon become operational") and structural reforms ("Parliament's approval of the landmark pension reform").

On 10 September, the IMF Executive Board completed its first review of Greece's performance under the SBA and authorized the disbursement of 2.16 billion SDR. The troika emphasized the need for more reforms, including cuts in health spending and wages, privatization and the abolition of trade barriers, on 23 November.

The second SBA review was completed on 17 December, and the IMF Executive Board approved a disbursement of 2.16 billion SDR. According to Deputy Managing Director and Acting Chair Murilo Portugal, "An arrangement for Greece under the Extended Fund Facility (...) will be brought forward for consideration by the IMF's Executive Board".

In their February 2011 Third Review Mission to Greece, the troika reported that all necessary reforms were being adopted and expressed their support for the Greek government. The third SBA review, completed on 14 March, allowed the government to draw 3.6 billion SDR. The troika acknowledged overall progress on 3 June, citing the need for fiscal structural reform to reduce Greece's deficit.

On 8 July, the Fourth Review Under Stand-By Arrangement was completed and the IMF disbursed SDR 2.9 billion SDR. The fund said on 11 October that "the recession will be deeper than was anticipated in June and a recovery is now expected only from 2013 onwards. There is no evidence yet of an improvement in investor sentiment and the related increase in investments (...) Overall, the authorities continue to make important progress". On 5 December 2011 The IMF completed its Fifth Review Under Stand-By Arrangement for Greece, approving a 1.9 billion SDR disbursement.

On 9 March 2012, the Greek government canceled the SBA and asked the IMF for an Extended Fund Facility (EFF) agreement. The government borrowed and repaid a total of 17.54 million of the initially agreed 26.43 million SDR.

=== Extended Fund Facility (2012-2016) ===
On 9 March 2012 (the same day the Greek government asked the IMF for an Extended Fund Facility (EFF) agreement), IMF managing director Christine Lagarde supported the agreement. It was approved on 15 March, with an immediate disbursement of 1.4 billion SDR and an overall commitment of 23.7853 billion SDR (2.159 percent of the Greek quota). The SBA's undisbursed funds were also cancelled. The program aimed to return to growth with improved competitiveness, a reduced minimum wage and public spending, and fighting tax evasion.

After a political crisis due to the Greek election, the IMF completed its First and Second Reviews Under Extended Fund Facility Arrangement and approved an €3.24 billion disbursement on 16 January 2013 with the new government. Policies were modified, such as the fiscal adjustment path and privatization targets. The Greek government liberalized product markets and improved bank recapitalization. According to the IMF, "Greece has made impressive progress under the new coalition government". Examples were a 15-percent drop in unit labor cost, an over-20-percent reduction in the minimum wage, and reforms which would reduce pension spending to about 14 percent of GDP. The Greek government also recapitalized important banks. Between 31 May 2013 and 30 May 2014, the IMF completed the third, fourth and fifth Reviews Under Extended Fund Facility Arrangement and Greece drew a total of €6.87 billion.

On 14 February 2015, after the Greek elections, IMF chair and managing director Christine Lagarde explained in a letter to the president of the Eurogroup problems with the new government's intentions. Lagarde noted that the Greek government was unwilling to reform its VAT policy and pension system and implement policies agreed to by the former government in areas such as privatization and the labor market.

On 30 June, Greece did not repay 1.2 billion SDR to the IMF—the first time a developed country missed an IMF payment. Another repayment, amounting to SDR 360 million, was missed on 13 July. The IMF published a 14 July study of Greece's public debt, calling it highly unsustainable and saying that it should peak at 200 percent of GDP in the next few years. Greece made the above payments to the IMF (1.6 billion SDR) on 20 July 2015, i.e., after a 20-day delay from its scheduled payment.

Discussions by the Greek government and IMF staff from 30 July – 12 August 2015, resulted in a new memorandum of understanding. According to Lagarde, it aimed "to restore fiscal sustainability, financial sector stability, and sustainable growth".

The EFF agreement was canceled in January 2016. The Greek government drew 10.2 billion SDR (instead of the 23.7 SDR initially agreed), and the IMF conducted five (instead of the initially agreed 16) program reviews.

== Proposed SBA (2017) ==
On 2 May 2017 the IMF said that it "reached a preliminary agreement with the Greek authorities on a policy package to support the recovery in Greece". On 7 July, the Greek government requested an approval in principle for an SBA to the IMF. The SBA would last for 13 month and 12 days, and 1.3 billion SDR (55 percent of the Greek quota) was requested. According to the government, the program would be active when Greece's European partners guaranteed debt relief.

The IMF approved a 1.3 billion SBA on principle on 20 July, awaiting assurances of Greece's debt sustainability. The Greek economic program was a macroeconomic stabilization with reforms including higher taxes on the middle class and pension cuts amounting to 3.5 percent of GDP (or surplus) until 2022. The Greek government promised to relax capital controls and preserve labor-market reforms, liberalizing Sunday trade and facilitating investment. The program was expected to create a steady-rate growth of one percent. However, the IMF said that "Greece's debt remains unsustainable". Despite its approval in principle, the SBA was never approved; on 21 June 2018, Lagarde said that "time has clearly run out to enter into a Stand-By Arrangement".

== Program outcomes ==
=== 2010–2012 Stand-By Arrangement ===
On 5 June 2013, the IMF published its report evaluating Greece's SBA. According to the report, the SBA improved long-term sustainability due to cuts in wages and pensions and a VAT increase; the Greek government significantly reduced its fiscal deficit and unit labor cost.

However, the IMF expressed disappointment at Greek privatization and labor-market flexibility; the government continued to spend more than the EU average on wages. The crisis was worse than expected; Greek GDP contracted 17 percent from 2009 to 2012 instead of the expected 5.5 percent, and the unemployment rate was 25 percent instead of the forecast 15 percent. The IMF had underestimated the impact of deflation, and said that the country's reforms "failed to boost growth". Greece met 32 of the IMF's 45 structural conditions.

=== 2012–2016 Extended Fund Facility ===
On 7 February 2017, the IMF published a report evaluating Greece's EFF. According to the report, the program's implementation was hindered by Greece's political instability and any program would have failed under the circumstances: "protracted recession and ... rapidly falling living standards". The IMF said that important reforms of public financial management and revenue administration had been implemented, and the Greek government reformed the minimum wage, barriers to competition, privatization and collective bargaining. Imports and unit labor costs were reduced, making a three-percent deficit in 2011 a 0.5 percent surplus in 2013. The banking system had been consolidated, and the 2012 debt decreased to 160 percent of GDP from 172 percent.

The IMF emphasized, however, that exports under-performed; Greece's governance indicators worsened during the program, and the debt was declared unsustainable in 2015. Growth, debt sustainability and competitiveness targets were not met; growth was less than expected, unemployment was higher and the recession was deeper, Nominal GDP in 2013 and 2015 was 12 and 20 percent lower than initial estimates, which "may have been too optimistic". The Greek government met 61 of 97 structural conditions; one was waived, and 16 were outstanding when the review was completed.

== Post-program monitoring ==
Greece is subject to post-program monitoring (PPM), focusing on its ability to repay the IMF, as a country which owes the fund more than 1.5 billion SDR or 200 percent of its quota. The first PPM was completed on 12 March 2019; the IMF concluded that "recovery in Greece is accelerating and broadening", with projected growth of 2.4 percent of GDP due to the export market, private consumption and investment. Although the country can repay its debt, the fund supports more reform for increased productivity and labor-market flexibility.

== Early repayment of Greece's loans ==
Repayment of Greece’s loans to the International Monetary Fund was completed two years ahead of schedule, in 2022.

== Criticism ==
The IMF's austerity policies were criticized as violating the Greek constitution and human rights. On 10 January 2014, the European Network of National Human Rights Institutions (ENNHRI) published a letter saying that privatization "complicated the access to essential public services such as water and sanitation and energy" and poor Greek citizens were denied healthcare because of government cuts. That year, the Greek Council of State declared austerity measures such as the 2012 wage cuts for academic personnel and the planned privatization of the Athens Water Supply and Sewerage Company unconstitutional.

A 2015 report by the European Parliament directorate-general for internal policies said that the austerity measures infringed the rights to a pension, to work, to healthcare and to justice. In October 2017, the Parliamentary Assembly of the Council of Europe reported that the austerity measures infringed the rights to healthcare, to an adequate standard of living, to work and to social security, with a "disproportionate impact on the most vulnerable".

According to a June 2018 report by the Council of Europe's Commissioner for Human Rights, the austerity measures negatively impacted the rights to adequate housing, healthcare and education. The report quoted a Greek National Commission for Human Rights (GNCHR) statement that "austerity measures undermine fundamental constitutional principles and violate constitutionally-guaranteed human rights". The IMF has been held responsible for violating Greek human rights by the Hellenic League for Human Rights (HLHR), the country's oldest human-rights organization.
