= Maria Zacharia =

Greek politician

Maria Zacharia MEP
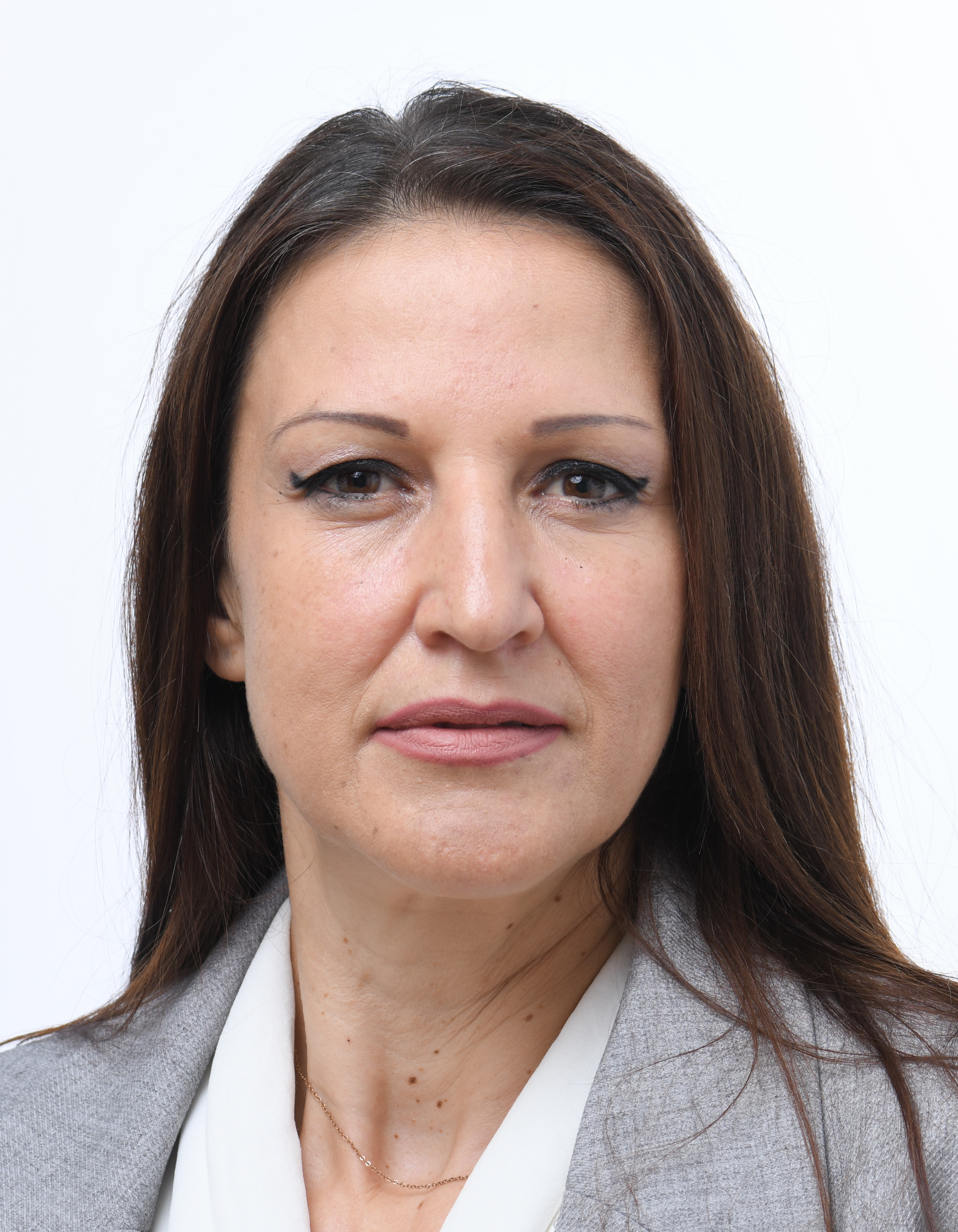

Member of the European Parliament for Greece
- Incumbent
- Assumed office 16 July 2024

Personal details
- Born: 1977 (age 47–48); Piraeus, Greece

Maria Zacharia (Greek: Μαρία Ζαχαρία) is a Greek politician for the Course of Freedom party. She is member of the European Parliament.
