= Brokerage politics =

The term "brokerage politics" is used to describe a style of governance practiced in Canada that emphasizes big tent ideology, opposed to staunch political polarization and rigorous political agendas, favouring moderate views. Historically, it has been incorporated into party platforms for broad voter appeal. Brokerage politics date back to the 1920s.
