= Drapanias =

Drapanias Δραπανιάς
- Community
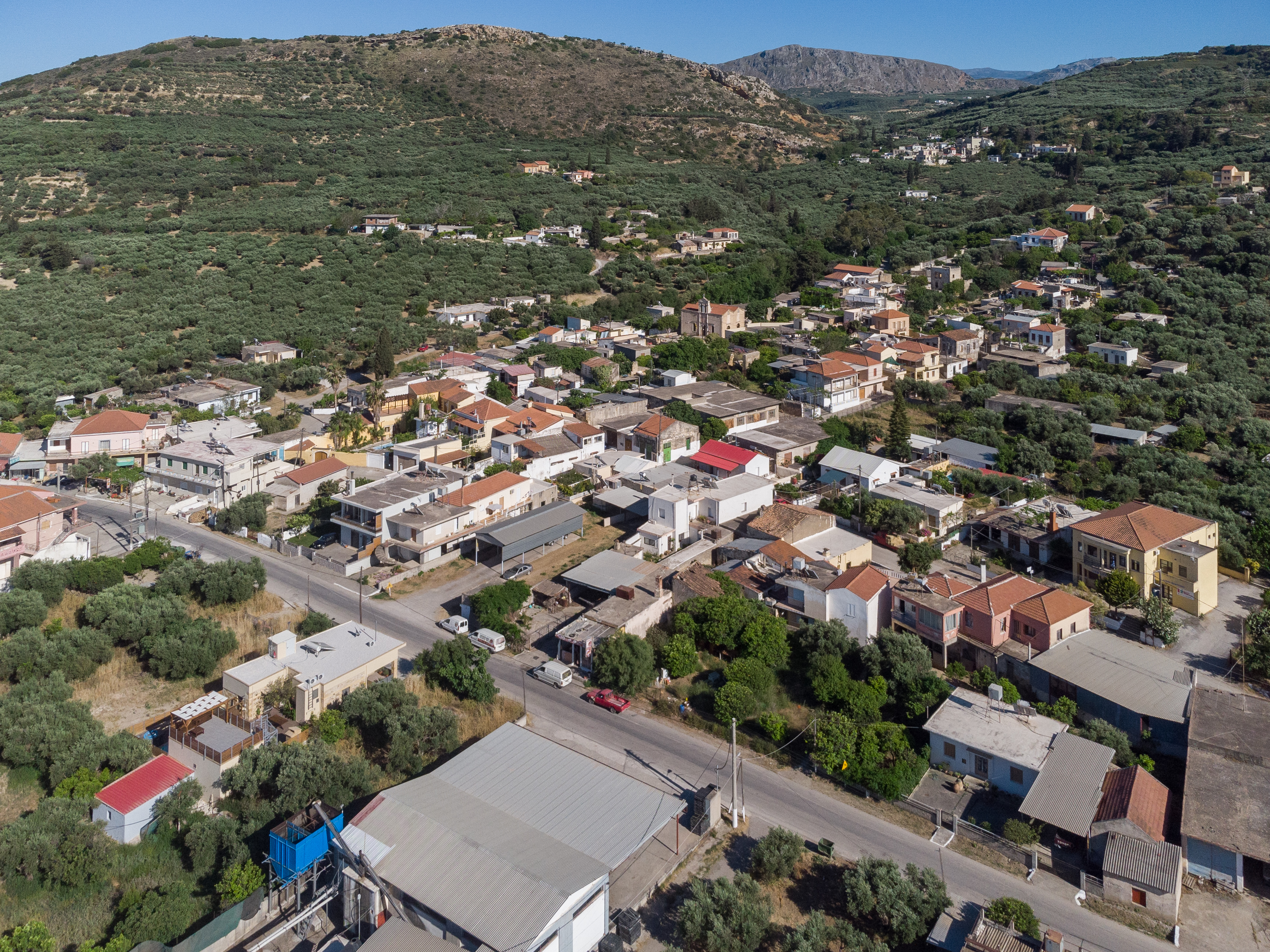
- Aerial view of Drapanias

- Location within Greece
- Coordinates: 35°29′31″N 23°42′18″E
- Country: Greece
- Administrative region: Crete
- Regional unit: Chania
- Municipality: Kissamos
- Municipal unit: Mythimna
- Elevation: 38 m (125 ft)

Population (2021)
  - Community: 409
- Time zone: UTC+2 (EET)
  - Summer (DST): UTC+3 (EEST)
- Postal code: 73400

Drapanias (Greek: Δραπανιάς) is a small village in northwestern Crete, in the regional unit of Chania. It was the principal town in the Cretan municipality of Kissamos. It was built in the ruins of the ancient town of Methymna.

The nearby village of Ano Drapanias ("Upper Drapanias") is sometimes considered to be part of Drapanias, with the northern beachside areas being referred to as Kato Drapanias ("Lower Drapanias").

Frequent KTEL buses connect the village with various locations, such as Kissamos and Chania.

The village and its people are memorialized in several works by the Cretan author Kimon Faradakis.

== Population ==
Historical population
Year	Pop.	±%
1981	515	—
1991	348	−32.4%
2001	462	+32.8%
2011	427	−7.6%
2021	409	−4.2%
Source: Population censuses

== History ==
Evidence of settlements at Drapanias dates back to circa 1600 BCE during the Greek Bronze Age, at the Minoan archaeological site of Nopigeia-Drapanias.

Drapanias is also considered to be a possible site of the Cretan city of Methymna, a settlement that survived into Roman times as well. A Roman bath on the site subsequently had a church dedicated to Saint George built into it, which has wall paintings dating to the early 15th century CE.

Along with the rest of Crete, from 1205 to 1669, Drapanias was under the control of Venice under the Kingdom of Candia. During this period, the Villa Trevisan was constructed 3 km (1.9 mi) outside the village limits.

Other surviving sites in the village include a tower and well dating to the Ottoman Greek period.

During the 1821 Greek War of Independence, the ship Terpsichore landed at Drapanias in order to besiege the Venetian fortress at Kissamos, which was ultimately successful in restoring Crete to Greek rule.

After the 2011 local government reform, Drapanias, which had been the seat of municipality of Mythimna, became part of the municipality of Kissamos as the Mythimna municipality was absorbed into it.

On January 25, 2022, the Egyptian freighter Manassa Rose M ran aground on the beach in the village and subsequently broke into two pieces.

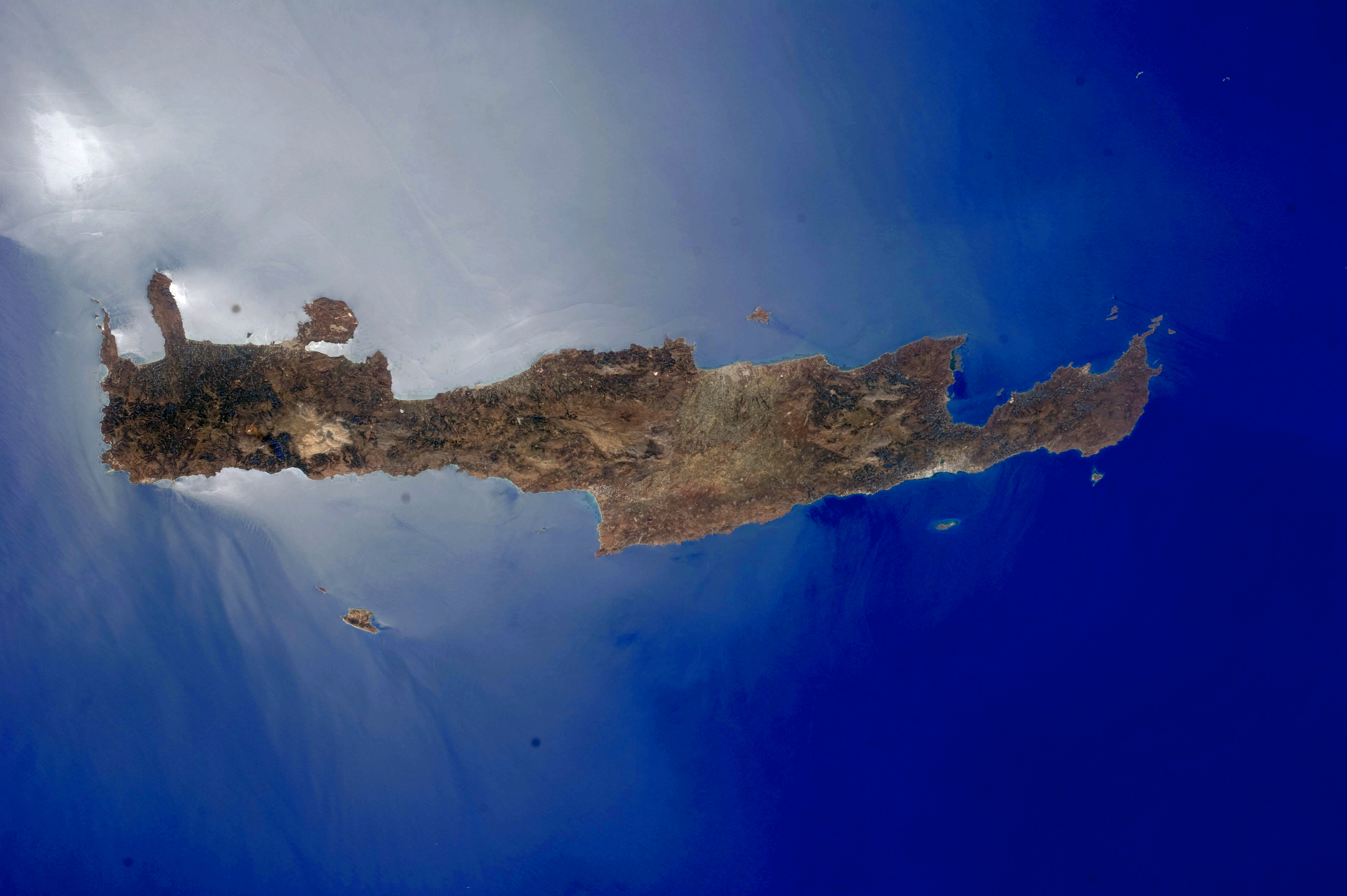
Crete from Satellite

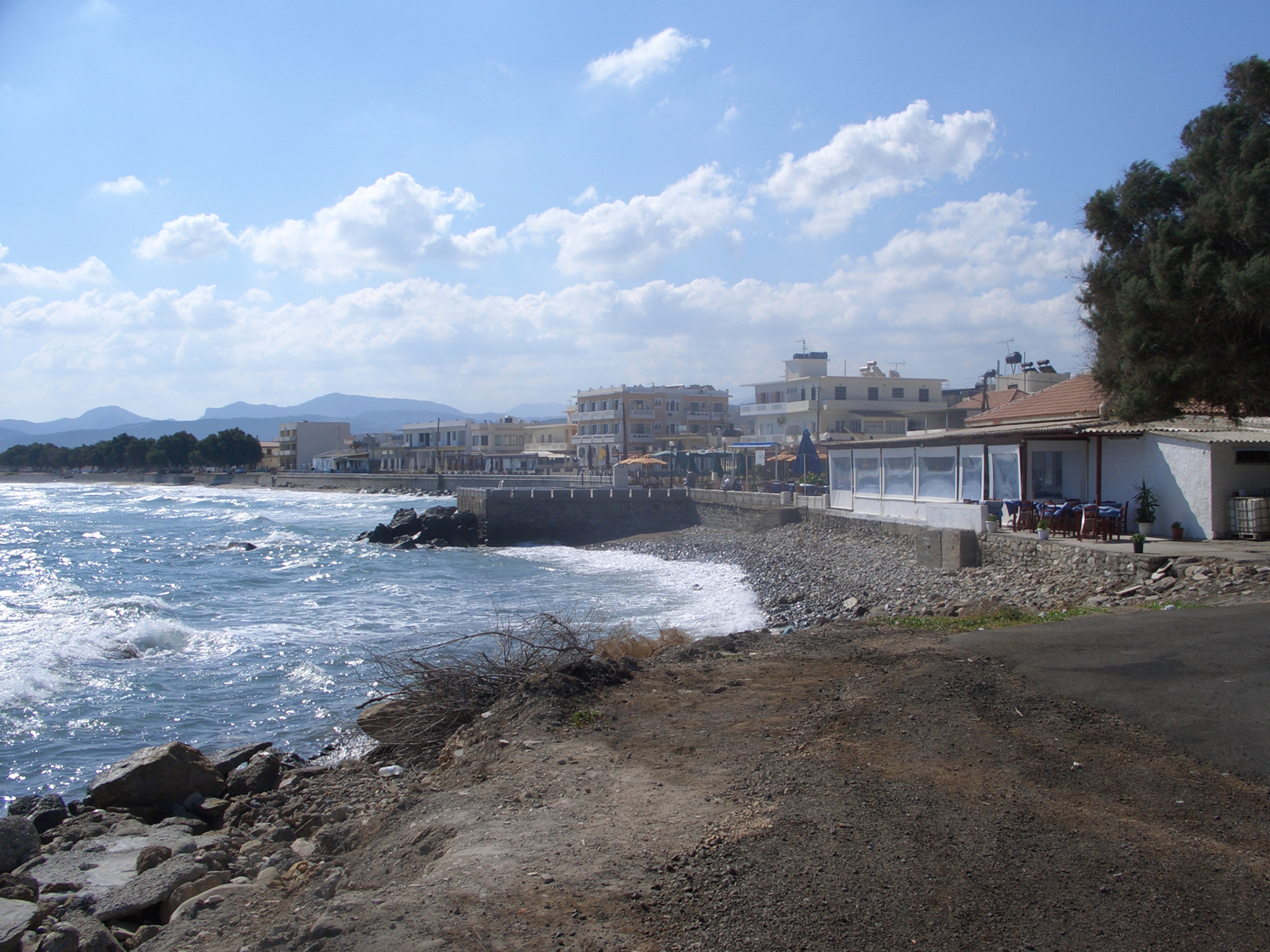
Kissamos
