= Dimitris Tziotis =

Dimitris Tziotis (Greek: Δημήτρης Τζιώτης) was a Panhellenic Socialist Movement (PASOK) mayoral candidate for Vouliagmeni in Athens and an entrepreneur.

== Education ==
Dimitris is a Political Science and Business Administration degree holder, majoring in International Relations and Marketing Management respectively. His post-graduate degree specializes in Olympic Studies. At the age of 25, he was awarded a mid career Masters of Arts from the Fletcher School of Law and Diplomacy at Tufts University in Medford, Massachusetts, 1995.

== Career ==
He is the president and CEO of Cleverbank, a strategy consultancy in Greece which has been awarded by the European Union as the best new enterprise for the year 2000. He is also the CEO of three tourism and development groups: Design Resorts, Riviera Greece and My Island. Furthermore, he established the future energy organization Green Tank.

== Marketing campaigns ==
Dimitris managed the successful Campaign of the Greek candidacy for bringing the 2004 Olympic Games in Athens. After that, he created the concept "Celebrate Humanity" for the International Olympic Committee, which ran for 8 years in 180 countries. He also developed the strategy for the Cultural Olympiad Organization and Olympic Truce, an institution aiming at ceasefire during the Olympic Games, a resolution voted for, by the record number of 202 member states of the United Nations Organization.

He was the first to introduce the need for branding Greece for the Ministry of Foreign Affairs, while he designed the global national tourism campaign. He has also provided strategic advisory to the Ministries of Culture, Public Administration, Development, Education, Sports, Health, Defence and the Cities of Athens, Moscow and Ancient Olympia.

In the International political arena, Dimitris advised the election campaign of Romano Prodi that led to his triumph against Silvio Berlusconi in the 2006 Elections in Italy. Furthermore, as an associate of Demos Think Tank, he contributed to the introduction of the Third Way into Politics. Moreover, he created the strategy for the 35th Reign Anniversary of HM Sultan Qaboos in Oman.

== Author ==
He is the author of Macedonia-the Greek Foreign Policy, 1994, International Olympic Academy, 1997, Hellas Trademark 2003, New Greece, 2008 and Green Change, 2009, ISBN 978-960-8386-82-2.

== Awards ==
His work has been awarded by the European Union, the Archbishop of Athens and Greece, the Greek Social Responsibility Organization, the Greek Advertising Association, Athens College, the American College of Greece and the Athens 2004 Olympic Games Organizing Committee. For his overall contribution to the successful organization of the Olympic Games, he has been awarded with the Medal of the City of Athens.
