= Stakeholder approach =

Internal and external Stakeholders

In management, a stakeholder approach is the practice that managers formulate and implement processes that satisfy stakeholders' needs to ensure long-term success. According to the degree of participation of the different groups, the company can take advantage of market imperfections to create valuable opportunities. It emphasizes active management of the business environment, relationships and the promotion of shared interests. This approach is based on stakeholder theory, which arises as a counterpart to business practices and management that focus on shareholders satisfaction. The implementation of this approach can reinforce the firm values and create competitive advantage. However, it has been criticized for overvaluing stakeholders and its difficulty to reach consensus.

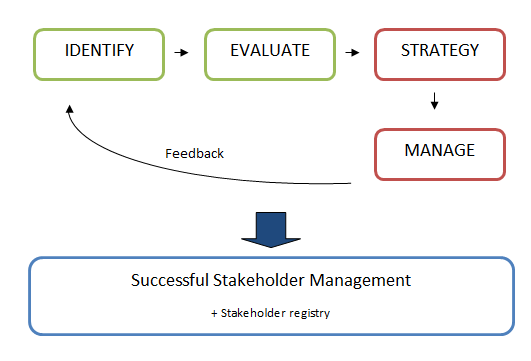
Stakeholder management process

== History ==
The stakeholder approach gained prominence with R. Edward Freeman's 1984 work, Strategic Management: A Stakeholder Approach, which challenged the traditional shareholder-centric view by advocating for the consideration of all parties affected by business decisions. This paradigm shift has influenced contemporary practices in corporate governance and social responsibility.

== Utility ==
=== Competitive advantage ===
This approach may create competitive advantage because it links the firm and stakeholders. The latter perceive the coherent application of the organizational values and relate to those. In that way, the company has the information about stakeholders it needs to treat them well and develop important initiatives. This reinforces the firm's reputation and loyalty among customers and other stakeholders, creates stronger brand recognition and increases trust in the firm. Even if there are limits in loyalty and reputation can be damaged, those two key elements can make a big difference creating barriers to other companies that may want to have information about stakeholder utility functions. Proponents maintain that a firm that follows the stakeholder approach gets the information it needs to satisfy the stakeholders' needs, making it easier to develop expertise. Those acquired skills can be transmitted, promoted and reinforced across the business operation of the firm creating core competencies. Over time, this approach can become an indispensable issue in the organizational culture.

=== Value creating through innovation ===
Firms that manage for stakeholders are more able to attract a higher-quality workforce. Employees' job satisfaction has an impact on the firm's ability to foster innovation. Workers who are satisfied with their jobs are more likely to engage in long-term thinking and generate potentially valuable ideas. Those firms can use information about stakeholder to devise new ways of satisfying them. Reciprocity is a key aspect in this approach: when stakeholders stand to benefit, they are more likely to reveal information about their utility function. That is why firms and firm managers can better meet consumers' needs by understanding their own customers and suppliers and using this information strategically and flexibly.

== Limits ==
=== Divergent interests ===
Trying to satisfy a large number of players complicates governance, and may make it difficult to reach consensus. The consideration of so many varying interests is likely to produce divergent opinions, while individual interests and self-motivated actors may warp decision-making outcomes. Moreover, this approach has been criticized for implying that all stakeholders negotiate on a level playing field, ignoring potential disparities between the various interested parties.

=== Overvaluing stakeholders ===
It has been suggested that obtaining information about stakeholders' utility functions may produce costs that can exceed the benefits. Therefore, in its intention to create value, managing for stakeholders can end up allocating too many resources to stakeholders. Further, taking into account that power among stakeholders is not evenly distributed, certain actors may be able to appropriate more of a firm's profit for themselves than other interested parties. This warps the distribution of value between shareholders, rather than maximizing returns.
