= Capital controls in Greece =

Monetary policy in Greece

Capital controls were introduced in Greece in June 2015, when Greece's government came to the end of its bailout extension period without having come to an agreement on a further extension with its creditors and the European Central Bank decided not to further increase the level of its Emergency Liquidity Assistance for Greek banks.

As a result, the Greek government was forced to immediately close Greek banks for almost 20 days and to implement controls on bank transfers from Greek banks to foreign banks, and limits on cash withdrawals (only €60 per day permitted), to avoid an uncontrolled bank run and a complete collapse of the Greek banking system. The capital controls were gradually minimized until their complete removal on the 1st of September 2019.

== Relaxation of capital controls in Greece ==
In September 2015, certain aspects of the imposed capital controls were relaxed. Four months after capital controls were imposed on 28 June 2015, two important modifications were published by the government: while still limiting withdrawals to €420 per week, account holders could withdraw the whole sum in one transaction instead of up to only €60 per day, thus significantly reducing the amount of time spent queueing at the banks and ATMs, and, furthermore, up to 10% could be withdrawn from funds deposited in Greece from abroad. To minimize the impact on tourism, people with foreign credit cards such as tourists could withdraw through ATMs higher amounts of cash. Other changes allowed time deposits to be terminated prematurely to cover real estate purchases and living expenses up to €1800 per month. Furthermore, resident Greeks making payments or remittances to foreign banks in which they had accounts in their name had the €1800 limit removed and businesses making payments abroad could send up to €5000 per day per client without seeking special permission. Still, the impact on business was dramatic as many exporters could not import the raw materials they needed for production as payments above the limits had to be approved by special committees who could approve imports of only €20 million per day in total with priority on medicines and food.

Six months into capital controls saw a further easing of the rules. While full or partial premature repayment of loans was still not generally allowed, the premature repayment of loans could be made by loan holders either through funds from abroad or by taking out a new loan to cover the amounts due on previous outstanding loans; additionally, loan holders could pay back the whole loan if the property was to be sold. Moreover, although still limited to €420 of withdrawals per week, special exemptions could be made to pay administration fees and debts to the state.

In December 2015, the finance ministry also signed off on measures that were designed to bolster the ailing Greek stock markets. Investors could now use "old money", (i.e. from their Greek bank accounts) to make transactions on the stock market in addition to the previously allowed "new money" from abroad or from the sale of stocks or other financial assets such as dividends from stocks.

Following the first successful review of Greece's 3rd bailout memorandum of August 2015 by the state's creditors in June 2016 and in its "11th ministerial decision on capital controls" since imposition, on 22 July 2016 the Greek government's Finance Ministry announced that "new cash" deposited in Greek banks from abroad would be free of any limit on withdrawals to encourage more of the money withdrawn (est. €50 billion, much of which found its way into safe deposit boxes or under mattresses) in the run-up to capital controls to find its way back into the Greek banking system which had already witnessed a €4.5 billion increase in deposits to €127 billion in the two months following the successful review as market jitters calmed. The decision also raised the limit on "old cash" withdrawals to €840 per two weeks instead of €420 per week. Finally, and in addition to first-year university students moving away from home to study and who already had previously been given permission to open bank accounts, Erasmus students and pensioners living abroad were also given permission to open new bank accounts in Greek banks. Still, the limit on cash for individuals travelling abroad remained at €2000.

== Effects of capital controls on card transactions ==
The effects of capital controls changed customer payment habits. Since the controls on withdrawals did not apply to the use of credit/debit cards to make purchases in Greek retail outlets, the average use of credit card transactions jumped from 4.5% to 19.5% in a relatively short time and up to 35% in supermarket transactions with more than 50% of people saying according to the Bank of Greece that they used their cards more than in the past, all of which left a paper trail that the Greek government was keen to encourage in its combat against tax evasion, despite the fact that the general use of credit transactions is believed to drive up the overhead for businesses and ultimately increase the price of goods and services for consumers. Before capital controls, in 2014, on average every Greek citizen used cards for transactions, not including ATMs, on average 8 times per year (€428 per year) against a 93-time European Union average (€3947 per year), while in 2015 the numbers rose to 20 times per year per citizen (€818 per year) and representing €9 billion, double that of the previous year.

== Prognosis on the end of capital controls ==
Despite positive pronouncements by bank insiders and the government that capital controls could be soon lifted or at least by the end of 2016, more than a year after their imposition, capital controls were still largely in place, unlike the example of Cyprus after the Cypriote crisis precipitated in March 2013 and who had largely eliminated their capital controls in April 2014 just over one year after the crisis had erupted. It must, however, be emphasized that the Cypriote crisis was more of a banking crisis than a state debt crisis and therefore not entirely analogous. Fears of a complete default of the Greek Banking system are still advanced by credit rating agencies despite continuing credit rating upgrades. The centre right government led by Prime Minsiter Kyriakos Mitsotakis lifted capitol controls on September 1, 2019.
