= United for Change (United Kingdom) =

- Founded: August 2018 (officially)
- Dissolved: October 2021
- Headquarters: 5th Floor Orwell House, 16-18 Berners Street, London, W1T 3LN
- Ideology: Centrism
- Political position: Centre

Website
- formerly: unitedforchange.org.uk www.unitedforchange.uk www.theunitedparty.org.uk

United for Change (UfC) was a short-lived British political movement, founded on a centrist platform. The movement gained attention after fundraising through large donations from philanthropists and donors was reported. Although only launched in August 2018, it had reportedly been in the process of development for at least a year. It was later rebranded as the United Party for its planned launch as a political party, however it was never formally registered as a party and the organisation was dissolved in 2021.

== History ==
In April 2018, British press reported that former Labour donor Simon Franks had set up a company, the Project One Movement, aimed at potentially forming a political party and fielding candidates at an election. It received commitments of roughly £5 million in funding from founders, and was compared to En Marche! in France. In August 2018, United for Change was launched as the political campaign name of the Project One Movement.

In late August 2018, one of the founders of the movement Adam Knight left to set up his own political organisation. He later voiced his support for the Liberal Democrats. The founders of United for Change were Simon Franks, Dr Saima Rana, Alex Chesterman OBE, Richard Reed CBE, Ceawlin Thynn, Ryan Wain, James Woolf.

United for Change was planned to be a grassroots movement, with the aim of launching as a registered political party after Brexit had concluded.

As of June 2019, it had reportedly scaled back its ambition to win the next general election as a new party but had indicated it still sought to launch fully as a political movement once Brexit was resolved, however Wain, the CEO, had indicated UfC was just a "digital platform" and not a political party. It did not subsequently launch as a party and contest the 2019 general election, and in October 2021, UfC was legally dissolved.
