= The River (Greece) =

Greek political party

The River Το Ποτάμι
- Leader: Stavros Theodorakis
- Founded: 26 February 2014
- Dissolved: 24 November 2019
- Ideology: Social liberalism Social democracy
- Political position: Centre to centre-left
- National affiliation: KINAL (2017–2019)
- European Parliament group: Progressive Alliance of Socialists and Democrats (2014–2019)
- Colours: Red, blue

Website
- topotami.gr

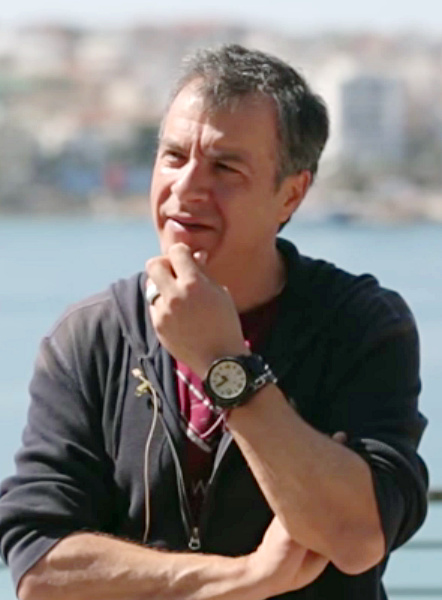
Journalist Stavros Theodorakis, founder of To Potami

Logo used by the party from its foundation until 2019

The River (Greek: Το Ποτάμι, romanized: To Potami, IPA: [to poˈtami]) was a centrist and social-liberal political party in Greece. The party was founded in February 2014 by Stavros Theodorakis. The party did not run in the 2019 elections and had no seats in the Hellenic Parliament.

== History ==
=== Party foundation ===
The party was launched on 11 March 2014 in Athens by TV presenter Stavros Theodorakis.

=== 2014 European Parliament election ===
In April 2014, representatives of The River met the President of the European Parliament, Martin Schulz, and with representatives of the Progressive Alliance of Socialists and Democrats (S&D), Alliance of Liberals and Democrats for Europe (ALDE) and The Greens–European Free Alliance (Greens/EFA) parliamentary groups.

In the 2014 European Parliament election held on 25 May 2014, the party received 6.6% of the national vote and the mandate to elect two MEPs, Giorgos Grammatikakis and Miltos Kyrkos.

On 27 May 2014, the two incoming MEPs announced their decision to sit with the S&D group in the European Parliament, whose intake included two MEPs from the Panhellenic Socialist Movement (PASOK), citing the group's commitment to "tackling the recession and unemployment in Greece and the South in general", while ruling out joining the Party of European Socialists.

=== 2015 legislative elections ===
On 24 December 2014, the newly founded party Reformers for Democracy and Development of former Democratic Left (DIMAR) MP Spyros Lykoudis announced an alliance with The River.

On 5 January 2015, the Liberal Alliance party suspended talks about a joint electoral list with The River after the participation of Liberal Alliance's president Gregory Vallianatos had reportedly been ruled out by The River officials. Later, The River's leader Theodorakis and Theodoros Skylakakis, the leader of the liberal party Drasi, gave a joint press conference announcing a joint electoral list for the forthcoming legislative election.

In the January 2015 legislative election on 25 January 2015, The River received 6.1% of the electoral vote, finishing fourth place with a mandate for 17 seats in the Hellenic Parliament. In the aftermath of the election party leader Theodorakis stressed that Greece needed to avoid another snap election, and, while ready to talk with SYRIZA leader Alexis Tsipras about forming a coalition government, he said they wouldn't support any coalition that includes anti-European forces. The River became part of the parliamentary opposition to the governing first Tsipras cabinet.

In the second election of the year, the September 2015 legislative election on 20 September 2015, the party received a reduced vote count of 4.1%, receiving 11 seats, remaining in opposition.

=== Resignations ===
On 19 April 2016, Yiannis Theoharis resigned from To Potami's parliamentary group.

On 18 October 2016, Iasonas Fotilas was expelled from the party. On 24 January 2017, he joined New Democracy.

On 21 November 2016, Katerina Markou declared herself an independent. On 27 February 2018, she joined New Democracy.

On 13 January 2017, Rodopi MP Ilhan Ahmet became the fourth MP elected in the September 2015 general election to resign from the party. He later announced he was joining the Democratic Alignment parliamentary group.

On 7 February 2017, Larissa MP Konstantinos Bargiotas resigned from the party, indicating that he would join the Democratic Alignment parliamentary group.

=== Movement for Change ===
In July 2017, PASOK leader Fofi Gennimata announced the formation of a new centre-left party before the end of the year. In the summer of 2017, Potami leader Stavros Theodorakis decided to participate in the creation of the party to provide an alternative to Syriza, led by prime minister Alexis Tsipras, and New Democracy, led by Kyriakos Mitsotakis. A leadership election for the new party will be held on 12 November and 19 November 2017, with initially 10 candidates declaring their participation, including Theodorakis. After the leadership election both Potami and PASOK–DIMAR will continue to have separate parliamentary groups until the new party's founding congress in spring 2018.

On the first stage open primary election on 12 November 2017, Theodorakis came in fourth place with 9.8% of the vote, failing to reach the second round. The run-off election on 19 November was won by Gennimata with 56% of the vote, with the new party's official foundation scheduled for 2018.

On 2 December 2017, Theodorakis was announced as being part of the six-member ruling council for the new party, the Movement for Change (KINAL).

=== Aftermath ===
On 1 July 2018, The River exited from KINAL due to issues including disagreements between Theodorakis and Gennimata over the Macedonia naming dispute.

In the 2019 European Parliament election on 26 May 2019, To Potami received just 1.5% of the national vote, failing to return any MEPs. Following the result, party leader Stavros Theodorakis announced that the party would not participate in the 2019 legislative election as well as his resignation as leader.

== Ideology ==
Following its launch, To Potami was initially described by the media as pro-European and centrist, inspired by social democracy and social liberalism and heavily reliant on Theodorakis' personal popularity to attract voters. It has been also described as liberal. The general description of the party's political position ranged from centrist to centre-left.

== Election results ==
=== Hellenic Parliament ===
Election	Hellenic Parliament					Rank	Government	Leader
Election	Votes	%	±pp	Seats won	+/−	Rank	Government	Leader
January 2015	373,868	6.1%	New	17 / 300	▲17	#4	Opposition	Stavros Theodorakis
September 2015	222,166	4.1%	-2.0	11 / 300	▼6	#6	Opposition	Stavros Theodorakis
2019	Did not run	–	-4.1	0 / 300	▼11	–	Extra-parliamentary	Stavros Theodorakis

=== European Parliament ===
European Parliament
Election	Votes	%	±pp	Seats won	+/−	Rank	Leader
2014	377,438	6.6%	New	2 / 21	▲2	#5	Stavros Theodorakis
2019	86,003	1.5%	-5.1	0 / 21	▼2	#9	Stavros Theodorakis
