= Stavros Theodorakis =

Greek journalist and politician

- Σταύρος Θεοδωράκης
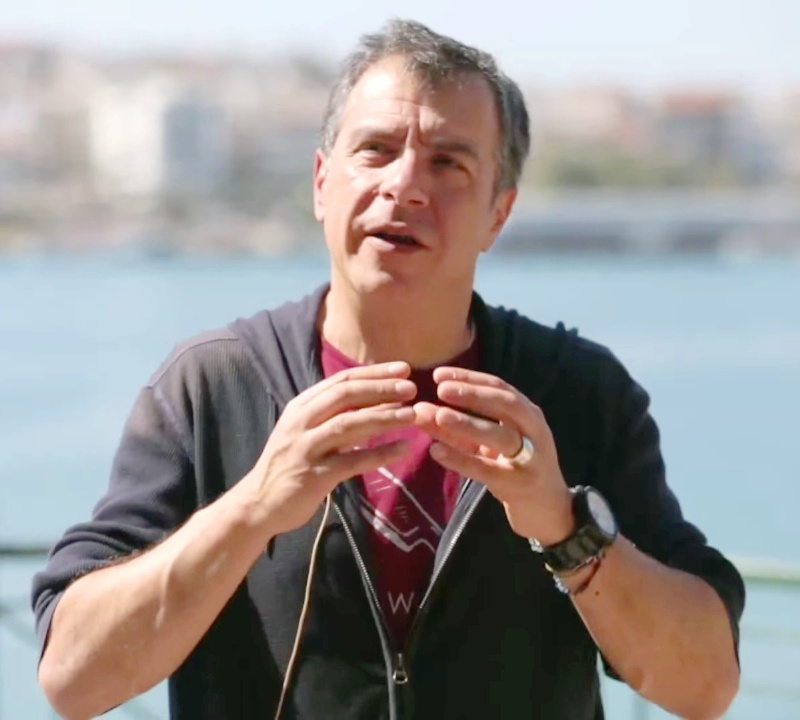
- Theodorakis in 2014

Leader of The River
- In office 26 February 2014 – 24 November 2019
- Preceded by: Position established
- Succeeded by: None

Personal details
- Born: 21 February 1963 (age 62) Drapanias, Greece
- Political party: The River (2014–2019)

Stavros Theodorakis (Greek: Σταύρος Θεοδωράκης [ˌstavros θeoðoˈracis]; born 1963) is a Greek journalist and politician, who founded and led the social liberal party To Potami (The River). In the January 2015 election he was elected to the Hellenic parliament, with his party receiving 6.1%, the fourth most votes, and gaining 17 seats. In the September 2015 election the party won only 11 seats with 4.09%. After the party's underwhelming performance in the 2019 European Parliament Elections (1.52% and no seats), Theodorakis stepped down as President of the party.

Born in 1963 in Drapanias near Chania on the island of Crete, Theodorakis was raised in Agia Varvara, western Attica.

His career as a journalist started in 1984 at the radio stations 902 FM and Skai 100.3, as well as the newspaper Eleftherotypia. Between 1985 and 1987 he was engaged in educating Roma. He also wrote three books.

In 2000, he started the show "Protagonists" at the former public TV channel NET, and in 2006 took it to the private station Mega TV. Every Saturday he wrote a column in the newspaper Ta Nea.

On 26 February 2014, he announced his decision to quit both his show at Mega TV and his column at Ta Nea in order to launch a new party. He also promised to take a back seat on the website Protagon.gr he is also involved in. Striving to "create a new European policy to foster a broader Leftist movement", he also stated that "the survival of a country cannot depend on the kindness of its creditors".

On 14 June 2017, he underwent surgery to remove a tumour at the Metropolitan Hospital Urological Clinic, led by surgeon Vasilis Poulakis. Doctors said the surgery went well.

Party political offices
New office	Leader of The River; 2015–2019	Incumbent
