= Stavros Kontonis =

Greek lawyer and politician (born 1963)

Stavros Kontonis MP
- Σταύρος Κοντονής

Minister of Justice, Transparency and Human Rights
- In office 5 November 2016 – 28 August 2018
- President: Prokopis Pavlopoulos
- Prime Minister: Alexis Tsipras
- Preceded by: Nikos Paraskevopoulos
- Succeeded by: Michalis Kalogirou

Member of the Hellenic Parliament for Zakynthos
- Incumbent
- Assumed office June 2012

Personal details
- Born: 1963 (age 62–63) Zakynthos
- Party: Syriza
- Education: National and Kapodistrian University of Athens

Haralambos-Stavros Kontonis (Greek: Χαράλαμπος - Σταύρος Κοντονής, b. 1963) is a Greek lawyer and politician, member of parliament from Zakynthos for Syriza since 2012, and was Deputy Minister for Sport in the Cabinet of Alexis Tsipras. He served as Minister of Justice, Transparency and Human Rights between 2016 and 2018.

He is the second person from Zakynthos to hold a seat in the Greek government since the Metapolitefsi, following the late-departed Dimitris Maroudas.

== Biography ==
He was born in 1963 on Zakynthos. He graduated from the law school of the National and Kapodistrian University of Athens in 1995. From then on he practiced as an attorney.

From the moment he completed his studies he identified strongly with political and trade union activity, and spent two terms as president of the Society of Law Students and had a spot as president of the central committee of the National Student Union of Greece. Likewise, he was nominated for a spot on the Senate of the University of Athens and a spot as secretary of the Central Council of Greek Communist Youth – Rigas Feraios (EKON), the then-youth organisation of the Communist Party of Greece (Interior).

Today he is a member of the Panhellenic Coordinating Committee of Syriza. Outside the party, he originated the Renewing Communist Ecological Left (AOKA), which he co-founded with Yiannis Banias.

He was elected member of parliament from Zakynthos for Syriza in 2012 and re-elected in 2015. He became Deputy Minister of Sport in the Cabinet of Alexis Tsipras.
