= 2008 SYN leadership election =

Internal Greek political party election

- 10 February 2008
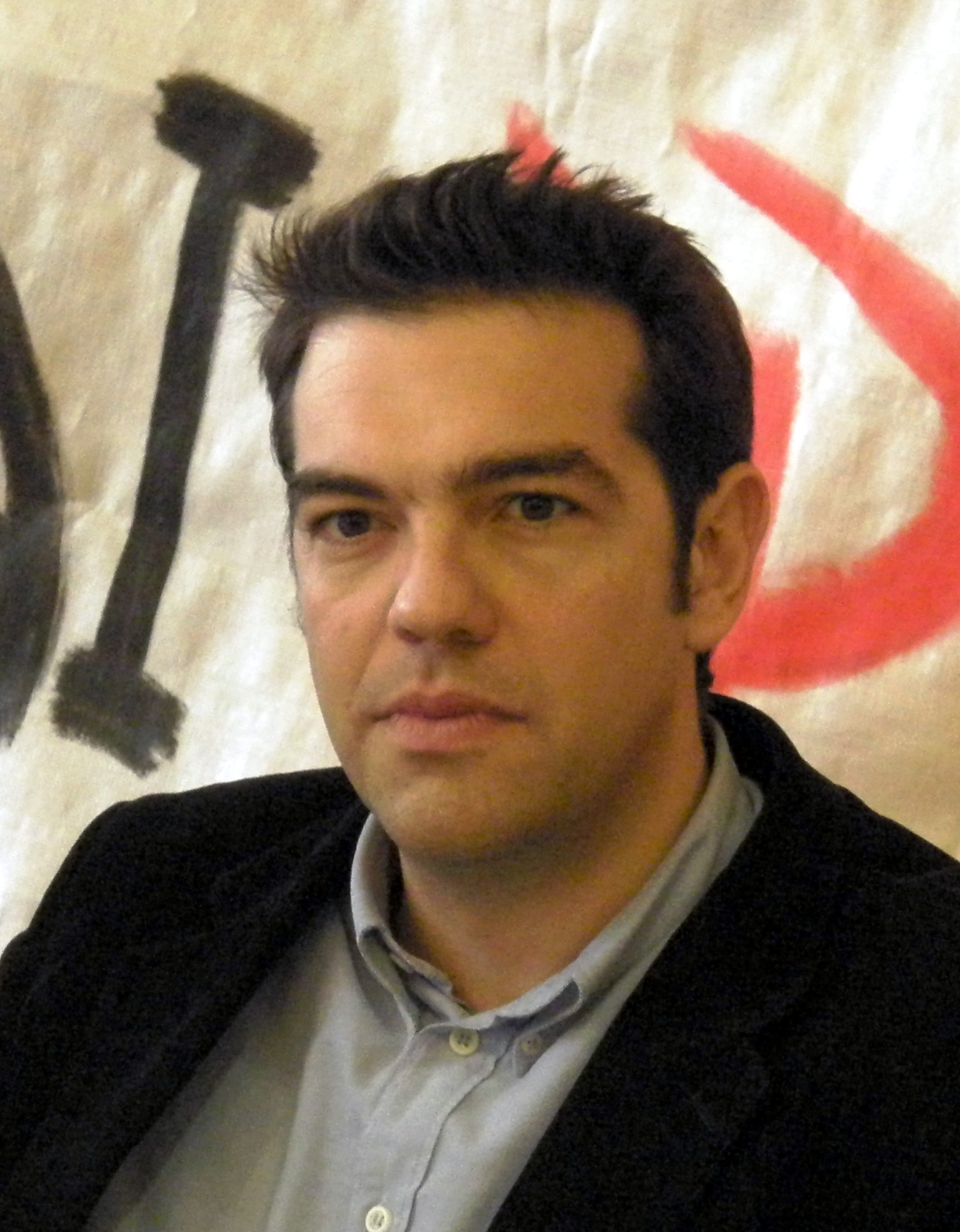

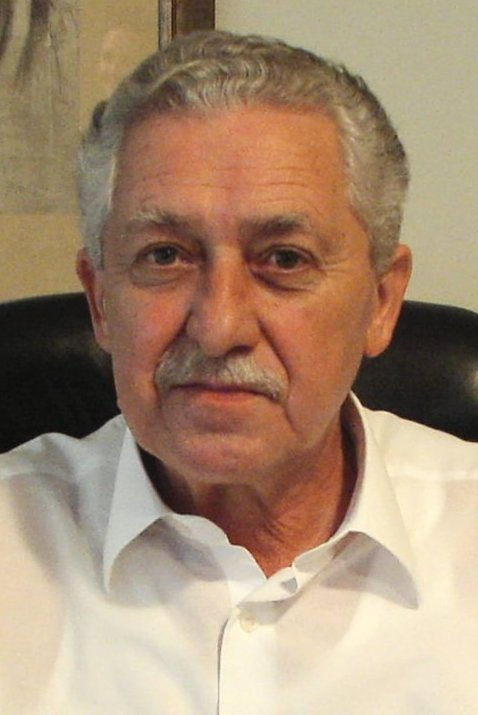
Candidate	A. Tsipras	F. Kouvelis
Delegate count	840	342
Percentage	70.41%	28.67%
Previous President of SYN
Alekos Alavanos
President of SYN
Alexis Tsipras

The 2008 Leadership election of Synaspismos took place on 10 February 2008, during its 5th Congress. The two candidates were: Alexis Tsipras and Fotis Kouvelis. Tsipras won with 840 votes, while Kouvelis earned 342 votes, while 14 members voted blank or invalid.

== Background ==
In October 2005, SYN President, Alekos Alavanos, endorsed Alexis Tsipras, known for taking part on the 1990–1991 student protests in Greece, in which he was part of the student group that held talks with the Mitsotakis government, to the party as a candidate for the Athens mayorship.

SYN members who backed Mihalis Papagiannakis for the mayor race protested against Alavanos' endorsement, who had previously supported Papagiannakis. A majority of the Political Secretariat decided to support Tsipras' candidacy, while the prefectural committee of Athens A' backed Papagiannakis on a knife-edge vote. On Alavanos' advice, the Central Committee rejected the prefectural Committee's decision with a two-thirds majority and Tsipras ended up as the Candidate for the Athens mayorship for SYN on the 2006 Greek local elections. He reached the 3rd place with a percentage of 10,51%, getting 4 seats on the city council.

== Candidates ==
Candidate	Position	Announcement
Fotis Kouvelis (59 years old)	Minister of Shipping and Island Policy (2018-2019) Other Positions: List: Alternate Minister of National Defence (2018); Minister of Justice (1989); Member of the Hellenic Parliament for Athens B (1989-1993, 1996-2014)	16 December 2007
Alexis Tsipras (33 years old)	Member of the Hellenic Parliament for Piraeus A (2023-) Other Positions: List: Member of the Hellenic Parliament for Achaea (2019-2023); Prime Minister of Greece (2015) (2015-2019); Minister for Foreign Affairs (2018-2019); Member of the Hellenic Parliament for Heraklion (2015-2019); Vice President of the Party of the European Left (2010-2016); Member of the Hellenic Parliament for Athens A (2009-2015)	18 December 2007

Fotis Kouvelis' candidancy was backed by members of the "Renewal Wing", Thanasis Leventis, Mihalis Papagiannakis, Nikos Tsoukalis και Anna Filini, SYN MEP, Dimitris Papadimoulis and the historical figure of the party, Leonidas Kyrkos

On the other camp, Alexis Tsipras' candidancy was backed by members of the "Left Shift", Nikos Voutsis, Giannis Dragasakis, Panagiotis Lafazanis, Dimitris Stratoulis and Nikos Hountis, and members of the "Red-Green Network" Christoforos Papadopoulos and Euclid Tsakalotos.

== Results ==
Summary of 10 February 2008 Synaspismos leadership election results
Candidate	Votes	%
Alexis Tsipras	840	70.41
Fotis Kouvelis	342	28.67
Valid votes	1182	
Invalid votes	3	
Blank votes	11	
Total votes	1196	100
Source: Official results as published in syn.gr

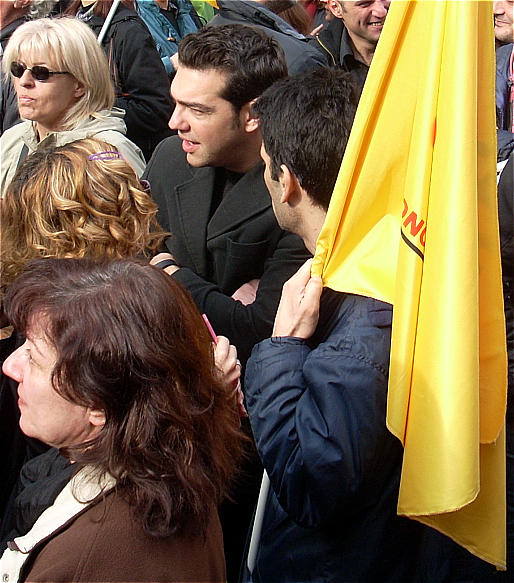
Tsipras at a demonstration for the pension system (2007).

== Subsequent events ==
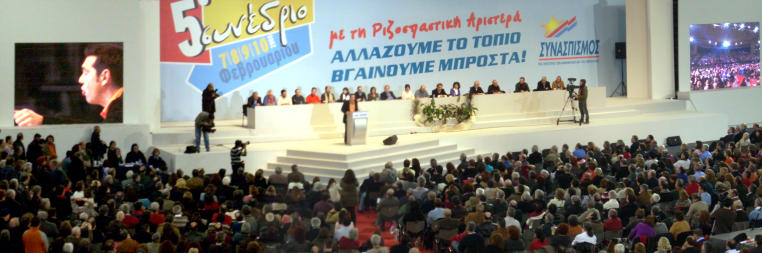
Alexis Tsipras speaking at the 5th Congress of SYN.

After the Congress, since Tsipras was not an MP, Alekos Alavanos remained as the President of the Parliamentary group of Syriza.

In the 2009 European Parliament election in Greece, Synaspismos, being part of Syriza, succeeded in electing Nikolaos Chountis to the European Parliament. The result was considered a failure, due to the stagnation of the percentage, and was criticized by the "Renewal Wing" of Synaspismos, with Leonidas Kyrkos calling for the dissolution of Syriza An internal party crisis followed, in which Alavanos announced his intention to resign as president of the parliamentary group of syriza and as an MP, which was not accepted and he recalled, a few days later.

In the coming months, and with the coming legislative elections of the same year, Alavanos decided to not take part in them. Syriza, led by Alexis Tsipras, received 4,60% of the vote and elected 13 MPs.

In June 2010, the 6th Congress of Synaspismos took place. The "Renewal Wing", led by Fotis Kouvelis, disagreeing with Synaspismos taking part in Syriza, left the party, founding the Democratic Left. Kouvelis was followed by 3 more MPs, that left the parliamentary group of SYN.

In the May 2012 Greek legislative elections and in the June 2012 Greek legislative elections, Syriza reached the second spot, and elected 52 και 71 MPs according.

In July 2013, with Syriza's first congress in sight, an emergency Synaspismos congress took place, in which a large majority decided to abolish and combine itself within Syriza
