= Fotis Kouvelis =

Greek lawyer and politician (born 1948)

- Φώτης Κουβέλης
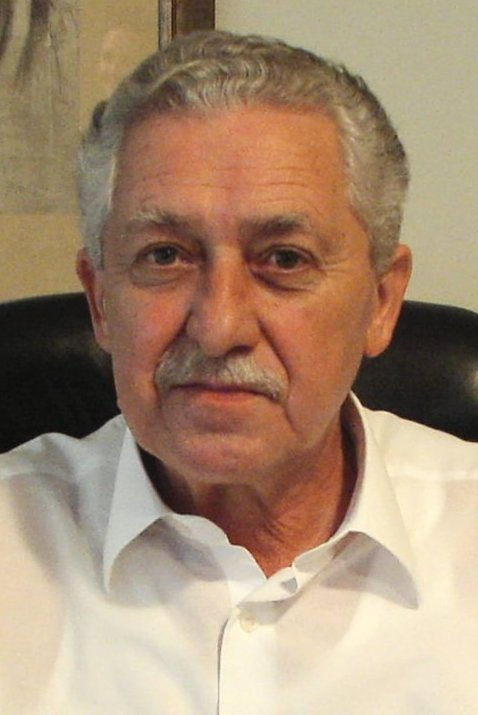
- Kouvelis in 2014

Minister of Shipping and Island Policy
- In office 29 August 2018 – 9 July 2019
- President: Prokopis Pavlopoulos
- Prime Minister: Alexis Tsipras
- Preceded by: Panagiotis Kouroumplis
- Succeeded by: Ioannis Plakiotakis

Deputy Minister of National Defence
- In office 28 February 2018 – 28 August 2018
- President: Prokopis Pavlopoulos
- Prime Minister: Alexis Tsipras

President of Democratic Left
- In office 27 June 2010 – 7 June 2015
- Succeeded by: Thanassis Theocharopoulos

Member of the Hellenic Parliament
- In office 8 November 1989 – 10 October 1993
- In office 25 September 1996 – 31 December 2014

Minister for Justice
- In office 2 July 1989 – 12 October 1989
- Preceded by: Konstantinos Stamatis
- Succeeded by: Konstantinos Stamatis

Personal details
- Born: 3 September 1948 (age 78) Volos, Greece
- Party: Democratic Left; Synaspismós (1992–2010); Greek Left (1987–1992); KKE Interior (1975–1986)
- Education: University of Athens
- Occupation: Politician
- Profession: Lawyer
- Website: www.kouvelis.gr

Fotis-Fanourios Kouvelis (Greek: Φώτης-Φανούριος Κουβέλης; born 3 September 1948) is a Greek lawyer and leftist politician.

== Biography ==
Kouvelis was born in Volos. He studied law and political science at the University of Athens.

A member of Lambrakis Youth, he was a founding member of the Communist Party of Greece (Interior), serving, from 1975 until the party's demise, on its central committee. He was a founding member of the Greek Left party, in 1987, and was elected its general secretary on 25 June 1989, remaining in this position until 1992. He was Minister for Justice in the 1989 government of Tzannis Tzannetakis and was responsible for the legal procedures for the Koskotas scandal. Kouvelis was a MP from 1989 until 2019.

He was the leader of the Democratic Left party from 27 June 2010 until 7 June 2015.

In March 2018, he started to support the second Alexis Tsipras government. On 28 February 2018, he became deputy minister of National Defense and served as the Minister of Shipping and Island Policy from 29 August 2018 to 9 July 2019.

== Footnotes ==
Political offices
Preceded by Konstantinos Stamatis	Minister for Justice; 2 July 1989 – 7 October 1989	Succeeded by Konstantinos Stamatis
Political offices
Preceded by Dimitris Vitsas	Deputy Minister of National Defence; 28 February – 28 August 2018	Succeeded by Panos Rigas
Party political offices
New political party	President of Democratic Left; 2010–2015	Succeeded by Thanasis Theocharopoulos
