= Kyrkos =

Kyrkos (Greek: Κύρκος) is a Greek surname. It is the surname of:

- Michail Kyrkos (1893–1967), Greek politician.
- Leonidas Kyrkos (1924–2011), Greek Resistance member, journalist and politician.
- Miltos Kyrkos (born 1959), Greek chemical engineer and politician.
