= Renewing Communist Ecological Left =

Renewing Communist Ecological Left Ανανεωτική Κομμουνιστική Οικολογική Αριστερά
- Abbreviation: ΑΚΟΑ
- Leader: Ioannis Banias
- Founded: 1987
- Dissolved: 2013
- Split from: KKE Interior
- Merged into: SYRIZA
- Headquarters: Akamidias 63, Athens, Greece
- Newspaper: Epohi
- Youth wing: Greek Communist Youth – Rigas Feraios
- Ideology: Eurocommunism; Marxism; Environmentalism
- National affiliation: Coalition of the Radical Left (SYRIZA)
- European affiliation: Party of the European Left (observer party)
- Colours: Red, white

Party flag
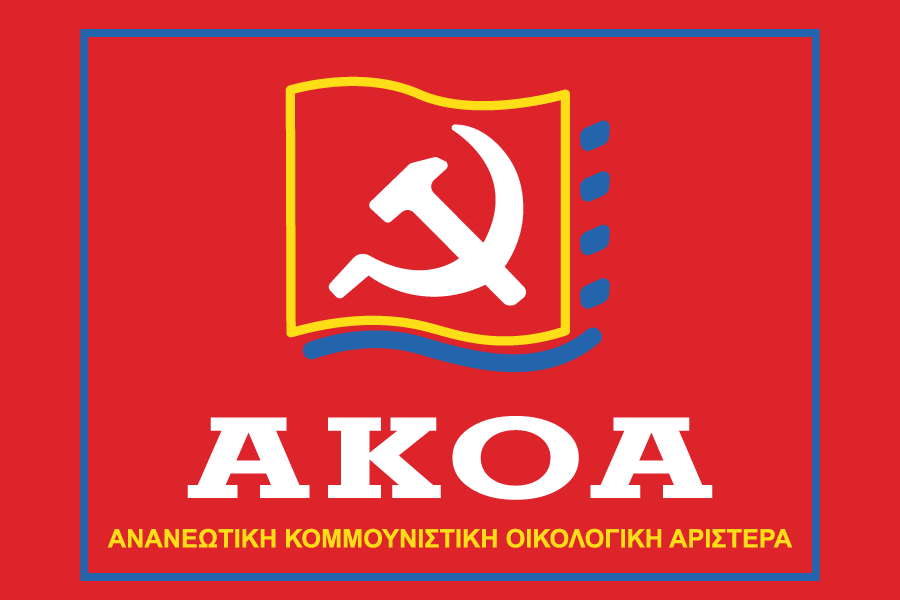

The Renewing Communist Ecological Left (Greek: Ανανεωτική Κομμουνιστική Οικολογική Αριστερά, ΑΚΟΑ; AKOA) was a Eurocommunist party in Greece.

Established in 1987 as KKE Interior – Renewing Left (ΚΚΕ εσωτερικού – Ανανεωτική Αριστερά, ΚΚΕσ–ΑΑ), the party resulted from the KKE Interior splitting in two. The party didn't play a major role in electoral politics during the 1990s. This would only change in 2000, when the party aligned with Synaspismos, and in 2004 became one of the founding forces of SYRIZA.

AKOA held the status of an observer in the Party of the European Left until it eventually dissolved into Syriza in 2013.

== History ==
=== Formation ===
Logo of KKE Interior – Renewing Left

In May 1986, on its 4th national congress, a majority of KKE Interior decided to reorganize into a broader leftist movement, thereby overruling party secretary Ioannis Banias' resistance to giving up Marxist-Leninist identity. When the majority faction, led by Leonidas Kyrkos, departed and at its April 1987 founding congress reconstituted as the Greek Left, the minority faction around Banias reorganized as KKE Interior – Renewing Left.

=== 1980s and 1990s ===
Banias' more orthodox wing was supported by KKE Interior's youth organization, the Greek Communist Youth – Rigas Feraios, which continued to play a relevant role in youth and students politics though losing the dominant status it once had. It was also affiliated with the weekly newspaper Epohi.

Unlike the Greek Left, which in the late 1980s strengthened ties with the KKE in becoming the driving force behind the formation of Synaspismos, AKOA largely stayed outside of coalitions. Following disappointing results in the three consecutive legislative elections of 1989 and 1990, the party abstained from further electoral participations during the 1990s.

It was only in the late 1990s that AKOA shortly approached the KKE, which in the meantime had left Synaspismos, to jointly contest the 1998 local elections. The results of the cooperation were however disappointing, leading AKOA to realign again, thereby losing the more hardline Communist Renewal faction that preferred remaining associated with the KKE.

=== Alignment with SYRIZA and dissolution ===
In the 2000 parliamentary elections the AKOA supported Synaspismos. Since 2004, the AKOA has been part of Coalition of the Radical Left (SYRIZA).

When in 2013, SYRIZA developed into a unitary party, AKOA decided to fully dissolve into the new structure.

== Electoral results ==
| June 1989 | Hellenic Parliament | 18,159 | 0.3 | 0 |
| June 1989 | European Parliament | 41.790 | 0.63 | 0 |
| November 1989 | Hellenic Parliament | 13,461 | 0.2 | 0 |
| 1990 | Hellenic Parliament | 8,827 | 0.1 | 0 |

*) as "Left Initiative of Communist Radical Ecologists" (with EKKE)
