= Dimitris Papangelopoulos =

Greek lawyer and politician (born 1954)

- Δημήτρης Παπαγγελόπουλος

Alternate Minister of Corruption Issues
- In office 23 September 2015 – 9 July 2019
- Prime Minister: Alexis Tsipras
- Preceded by: none (new post)
- Succeeded by: none (post abolished)

Minister of Justice, Transparency and Human Rights
- In office 28 August 2015 – 23 September 2015
- Prime Minister: Vassiliki Thanou-Christophilou
- Preceded by: Nikos Paraskevopoulos

Deputy Minister of Justice
- In office 6 May 2015 – 28 August 2015
- Prime Minister: Alexis Tsipras

Director General of the National Intelligence Service
- In office 14 July – 13 October 2009
- Prime Minister: Kostas Karamanlis
- Preceded by: Joannis Koradis
- Succeeded by: Konstantinos Bikas

Personal details
- Born: 1954 (age 71–72)
- Occupation: Lawyer

Dimitris Papangelopoulos (Greek: Δημήτρης Παπαγγελόπουλος; born 1954) is a Greek lawyer and politician who served as Alternate Minister of Corruption Issues in the Second Cabinet of Alexis Tsipras.

He has previously served as the Deputy Minister of Justice in the First Cabinet of Alexis Tsipras, from May to August 2015, and as interim Minister of Justice, Transparency and Human Rights in the Caretaker Cabinet of Vassiliki Thanou-Christophilou. Papangelopoulos was also the Director General of the National Intelligence Service for three months in 2009.

== Career ==
Papangelopoulos became a lower court prosecutor in 1983 and remained in this role until 2003, when his fellow prosecutors elected him head of the Athens office of lower court prosecutors. In 2006, he was appointed a special prosecutor responsible for supervising the police's organised crime and counter-terrorism activities.

Papangelopoulos called for a prompt investigation into the large-scale blackout that took place a month before the 2004 Summer Olympics in Athens. In 2007, Papangelopoulos was considering whether a series of arson attacks on Greece's forests could be tried under anti-terrorism law.

Under the premiership of Kostas Karamanlis, Papangelopoulos served as Director General of the National Intelligence Service. He served from 14 July 2009 to 13 October 2009, and was appointed as part of a major reshuffle.

In March 2015, he was appointed Secretary General of the Ministry of Justice, Transparency and Human Rights. On 6 May 2015, Papangelopoulos was sworn in as a Deputy Minister of Justice in the First Cabinet of Alexis Tsipras, serving under Nikos Paraskevopoulos as Minister. According to a statement, he was brought in to focus on increasing the transparency of the judiciary.

Papangelopoulos served as the interim Minister of Justice, Transparency and Human Rights in the Caretaker Cabinet of Vassiliki Thanou-Christophilou from August to September 2015 before returning to the Second Cabinet of Alexis Tsipras on 23 September as the Alternate Minister of Corruption Issues in the Ministry of Justice, Transparency and Human Rights.
