= Scotland-GDR Society =

The Scotland-GDR Society was an association based in Scotland, dedicated to promoting relations with the German Democratic Republic. The organisation was founded on 6 September 1986, as the six Scottish local branches of the Britain-GDR Society broke away and formed their own organisation.

The foundation of the Scotland-GDR Society had been preceded by tensions within the Britain-GDR Society in the 1980s. Whilst the Britain-GDR Society had failed to make any major inroads in British politics, its Scottish branches had managed to build a significant network among the Scottish left-wing movement. Led by Marlene Smith and Peter Smith, the Scottish branches of the society had a degree of autonomy. It had mainly been active in Glasgow, Dundee and Aberdeen. And the East Germans had become increasingly frustrated with the Eurocommunist leadership in the Britain-GDR Society, leading to splits in the organisation.

The Scotland-GDR Society held its first national congress on 20 March 1988. As of 1988, the organisation had 550 members. As of 1990, Peter Smith served as the secretary of the Scotland-GDR Society.
