= Nikos Paraskevopoulos =

Greek politician (born 1949)

Nikos Paraskevopoulos Νίκος Παρασκευόπουλος

Minister of Justice, Transparency and Human Rights
- In office 23 September 2015 – 4 November 2016
- Prime Minister: Alexis Tsipras
- Preceded by: Dimitris Papangelopoulos
- Succeeded by: Stavros Kontonis

Minister of Justice, Transparency and Human Rights
- In office 27 January – 28 August 2015
- Prime Minister: Alexis Tsipras
- Preceded by: Charalampos Athanasiou
- Succeeded by: Dimitris Papangelopoulos

Personal details
- Born: 1949 (age 76–77) Athens, Greece
- Party: Syriza
- Education: National Technical University of Athens

Nikos Paraskevopoulos (Greek: Νίκος Παρασκευόπουλος) is a Greek criminologist who is a former Greek Minister of Justice, Transparency and Human Rights. He was a professor of criminal law at the Aristotle University of Thessaloniki's Law School. In the September 2015 Greek legislative election, he was elected MP for the Thessaloniki A constituency with Syriza. He has also served as the Minister of Justice of Greece from 27 January to 28 August 2015.

Paraskevopoulos was responsible for criminal matters under former Minister of Justice George Kouvelakis (1993–95), and for prison inmates rehabilitation programs from 1988 to 1997. He is the vice president of KETHEA, the largest drug-addicts' rehabilitation and social reintegration network in Greece.

While in Syriza's 2012 shadow cabinet, Zoe Konstantopoulou had been nominated for justice, after the January 2015 legislative election it was decided to give the post to independent expert Paraskevopoulos.

Political offices
| Preceded by Charalampos Athanasiou | Minister of Justice, Transparency and Human Rights; 27 January 2015–28 August 2015 | Succeeded by Dimitris Papangelopoulos |
| Preceded by Dimitris Papangelopoulos | Minister of Justice, Transparency and Human Rights; 23 September 2015–2016 | Succeeded by Stavros Kontonis |
