= Ioannis Banias =

Greek politician (1939–2012)

Ioannis (Yannis) Banias (Greek: Γιάννης Μπανιάς) (27 September 1939 – 29 March 2012) was a Greek politician, and former member of the Hellenic Parliament for the Coalition of Radical Left (2007–2009).

Banias was born in Melissourgoi, Arta. He was a member of the Communist Party of Greece from the beginning of 1960s until its split in 1968 when he continued his activities in the Communist Party of Greece (Interior). He was elected president of the latter in 1982. He later participated in the formation of the Renewing Communist Ecological Left and was elected as the president of that group. He died in Athens on 28 March 2012, after a long battle with cancer.

== See also ==
- Politics of Greece
