= Greek Left =

Greek Left Ελληνική Αριστερά Elliniki Aristera
- General Secretary: Fotis Kouvelis
- Founder: Leonidas Kyrkos
- Founded: 1987
- Dissolved: 1992
- Preceded by: Communist Party of Greece (Interior)
- Merged into: Synaspismos
- Ideology: Eurocommunism
- Political position: Left-wing

Greek Left (Greek: Ελληνική Αριστερά, Elliniki Aristera, ΕΑΡ; EAR) was a Greek political party.

It emerged, in January 1987, from the split in the Communist Party of Greece (Interior) into the Communist Party of Greece (Interior)-Renewing Left and the Greek Left. Its ideology was Eurocommunism.

In December 1988, Greek Left signed a common report with the Communist Party of Greece (KKE) about the current political situation. This was the first step in the creation of Synaspismos, a coalition of parties, in February 1989. The common report was written by Mimis Androulakis and Giannis Dragasakis of the KKE and Grigoris Giannaros and Dimitrios Papadimoulis of the Greek Left. It was published in Rizospastis on 8 December 1988.

Greek Left was the main power in Synaspismos, after the KKE.

Its leader was Leonidas Kyrkos and its general secretary, from 1989 to 1992, was Fotis Kouvelis.

The Greek Left participated with Synaspismos in three parliamentary elections, once in the local elections and once in the elections for the European Parliament in 1989. In 1992, it merged into Synaspismos when the latter transformed from a coalition to a single party.

== See also ==
- Greek Left Alliance
