= Miltos Kyrkos =

Greek chemical engineer and politician

- Μίλτος Κύρκος
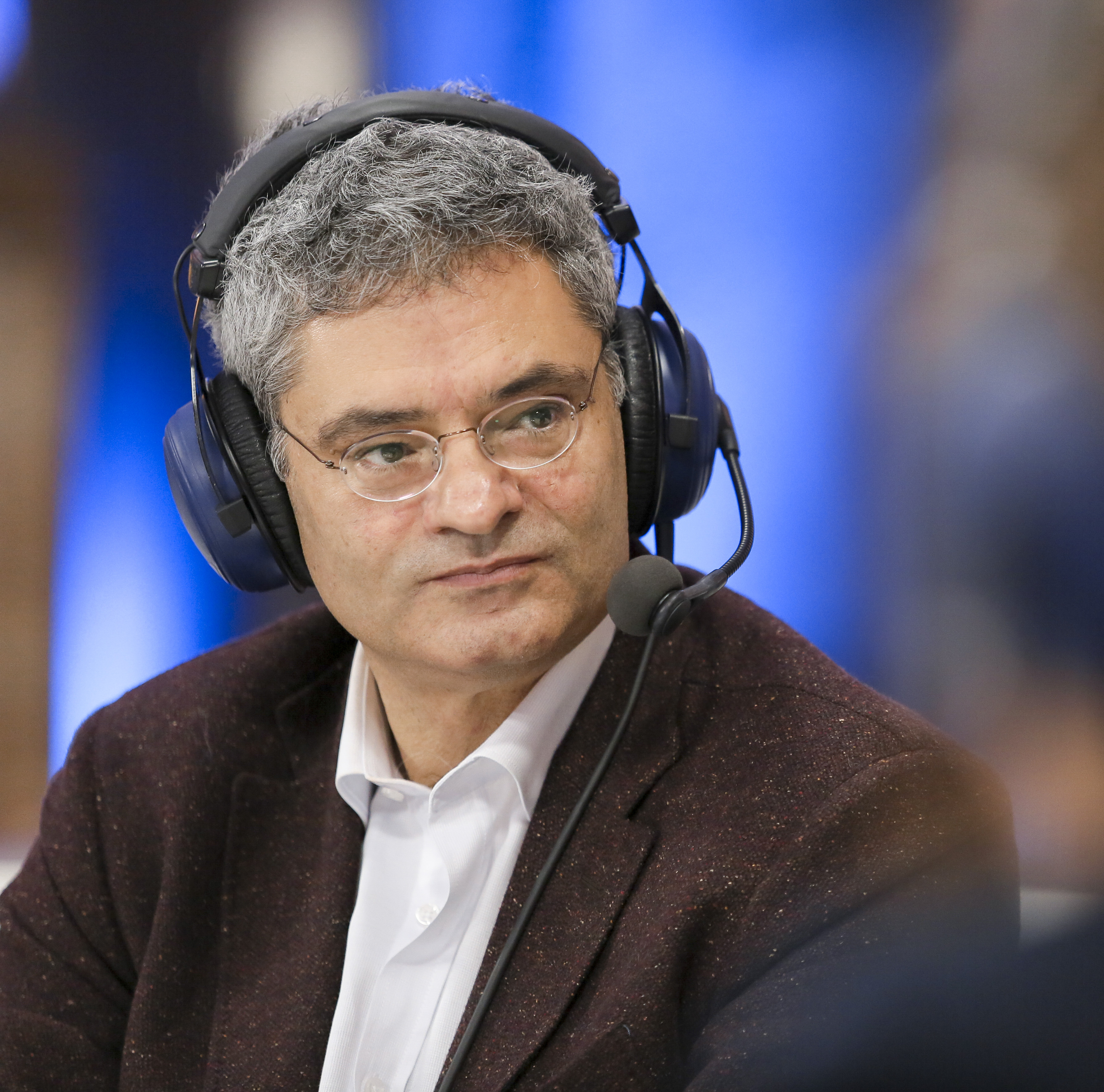

Member of the European Parliament for Greece
- In office 2014–2019

Personal details
- Born: April 1, 1959 (age 66); Athens, Greece
- Political party: To Potami
- Parent: Leonidas Kyrkos
- Profession: Chemical engineer
- Website: http://mkyrkos.gr

Miltos Kyrkos (Greek: Μίλτος Κύρκος; born 1 April 1959) is a Greek chemical engineer and politician of To Potami. In 2014, he was elected Member of the European Parliament (MEP).

== Life ==
Miltos Kyrkos was born in Athens as the son of the leftist politician and former Member of the Hellenic Parliament and the European Parliament, Leonidas Kyrkos, who in 2010 was one of the founding members of DIMAR. He graduated as a chemical engineer in Romania and was a member of the communist youth organization Rigas Feraios. Kyrkos lives in the predominantly leftist neighborhood of Athens, Exarchia.

=== Member of the European Parliament ===
In the 2014 European Parliament election, he was elected one of two MEPs on the list of the newly founded political party The River. He affiliates with the parliamentary group of the Progressive Alliance of Socialists and Democrats (S&D) and is member of the Committee on Transport and Tourism and vice-chair of the Delegation to the EU-Turkey Joint Parliamentary Committee.
