= Katerina Savvaidou =

- Κατερίνα Σαββαΐδου

Secretary General of Public Revenue
- In office 24 June 2014 – 22 October 2015
- Appointed by: Gikas Hardouvelis
- Prime Minister: Antonis Samaras; Alexis Tsipras
- Preceded by: Haris Theoharis

Personal details
- Born: 10 October 1972 (age 53) Athens
- Education: University of Athens; Panthéon-Assas University

Katerina Savvaidou (Greek: Κατερίνα Σαββαΐδου) is a Greek lawyer who served as the Secretary General of Public Revenue in the Ministry of Finance from 24 June 2014 to 22 October 2015, when she was dismissed from office by the cabinet in a unanimous decision. She was born in Athens on October 10, 1972.

== Education ==
Savvaidou studied law at the National and Kapodistrian University of Athens in 1995 before completing several postgraduate qualifications at the Panthéon-Assas University in Paris. Those included a diploma in French studies (DEUF), a Master's degree in public law (DEA de Droit Public Intern), a master's degree in public finance and tax law (DEA de Finances Publiques et Fiscalite) and a PhD with the thesis title: "The compulsory collection of taxes in French and Greek law". Her PhD was completed in 2003. From 2008 to 2009 she completed a postgraduate program on "Comparative Tax Policy and Administration" at Harvard University.

== Academic career ==
Savvaidou pursued post-doctoral research into corporate taxation at the University of Athens. She has also taught at the University of Athens, the National School of Public Administration and the National School of Judges. She is currently a lecturer at the Aristotle University of Thessaloniki as well as a visiting professor at University of Macedonia. She has been awarded by European Commission Jean Monnet Chair in European Tax Policy and Administration.

She has published numerous books and articles in tax policy and administration. These include the monograph entitled "Financial Transparency. Initiatives, Standards and Codes, Financial Management Assessment Tools, Financial Rules and Institutions, Greek Financial Reform ", for which she was awarded the Ioannis - Ionos Tsatsaroni Prize by the Academy of Athens.

== Professional career ==
Savvaidou has worked as an adviser to the Ministry of Finance and to the private sector over the issue of tax. Before becoming the Secretary General, she worked as a senior manager at PricewaterhouseCoopers.

Savvaidou became the Secretary General of Public Revenue on 24 June 2014, succeeding Haris Theoharis, who cited personal reasons for his resignation. The role effectively made Savvaidou the top tax official in Greece as she was made head of the public revenue authority, responsible for tax collection.

== Controversy ==
On 16 October 2015, the Minister of Finance, Euclid Tsakalotos, at the request of the Prime Minister of Greece, Alexis Tsipras, asked Savvaidou to resign. This took place because an anti-corruption prosecutor, Yiannis Dragatsis, had filed charges against her and she was expected to answer questions over them on 20 October.

- On 20 October, Savvaidou faced allegations from anti-corruption prosecutor Yiannis Dragatsis over two separate incidents: one concerned a decision to review a fine of €78 million imposed on an IT firm, whilst the second involved the extension of the time that television channels had to pay a special tax on advertising revenue. In a statement released on the same day, Savvaidou rebuffed both of the charges, claiming that neither of the charges leveled against her resulted in losses for the state.
- On 22 October, the "cabinet unanimously accepted the proposal of the Finance Minister to dismiss" Savvaidou from her role. There were some suspicions that the move was politically motivated. In a statement issued in response to her dismissal, Savvaidou said that: "I refused to resign from my post, because I cannot depart at a time when my attention to duties is being questioned in such an unfounded manner and my honesty and dignity is being slighted".
- On 14 April 2016, the Athens Inquiry Council, by its opinion (1338/2016), ruled that the first charge against Savvaidou was unfounded and ruled that no charges should be brought against her for her TV ad tax extension of payment. The Council considered that the decision did not harm the State. The Athens Appeals Council's vote became irrevocable as the appeal was dismissed. Indeed, according to the Appeals Chamber, she was wrongly prosecuted without any prior investigation and consequently her direct referral to the Athens Trial Chamber hearing, which was the reason for her dismissal before the expiry of her term was illegal.
- On July 6, 2017, Savvaidou was also acquitted of the second charge of attempted infidelity related to the decision to reaudit three companies by unanimous vote of the Athens Court of Appeals (1120/2017).
- On July 26, 2017, the Attorney of the Supreme Court of Appeal Xeni Demetriou appealed against the dismissal of the Athens Council of Appeals, finding that it had no full reason. However, there were spikes for the purposefullness of this Supreme Court decision.
- Finally, on August 10, 2018, the Criminal Chamber of the Supreme Court decided (1292/2018) to reject the appeal of the Supreme Court of Appeal, as the reasons presented to it by Xeni Dimitriou were thus unfounded so the decision by the Athens Appeals Council became irrevocable.
