= List of international prime ministerial trips made by Alexis Tsipras =

This is a list of international trips made by Alexis Tsipras, as Prime Minister of Greece from 2015 to 2019.

== Summary of international trips ==
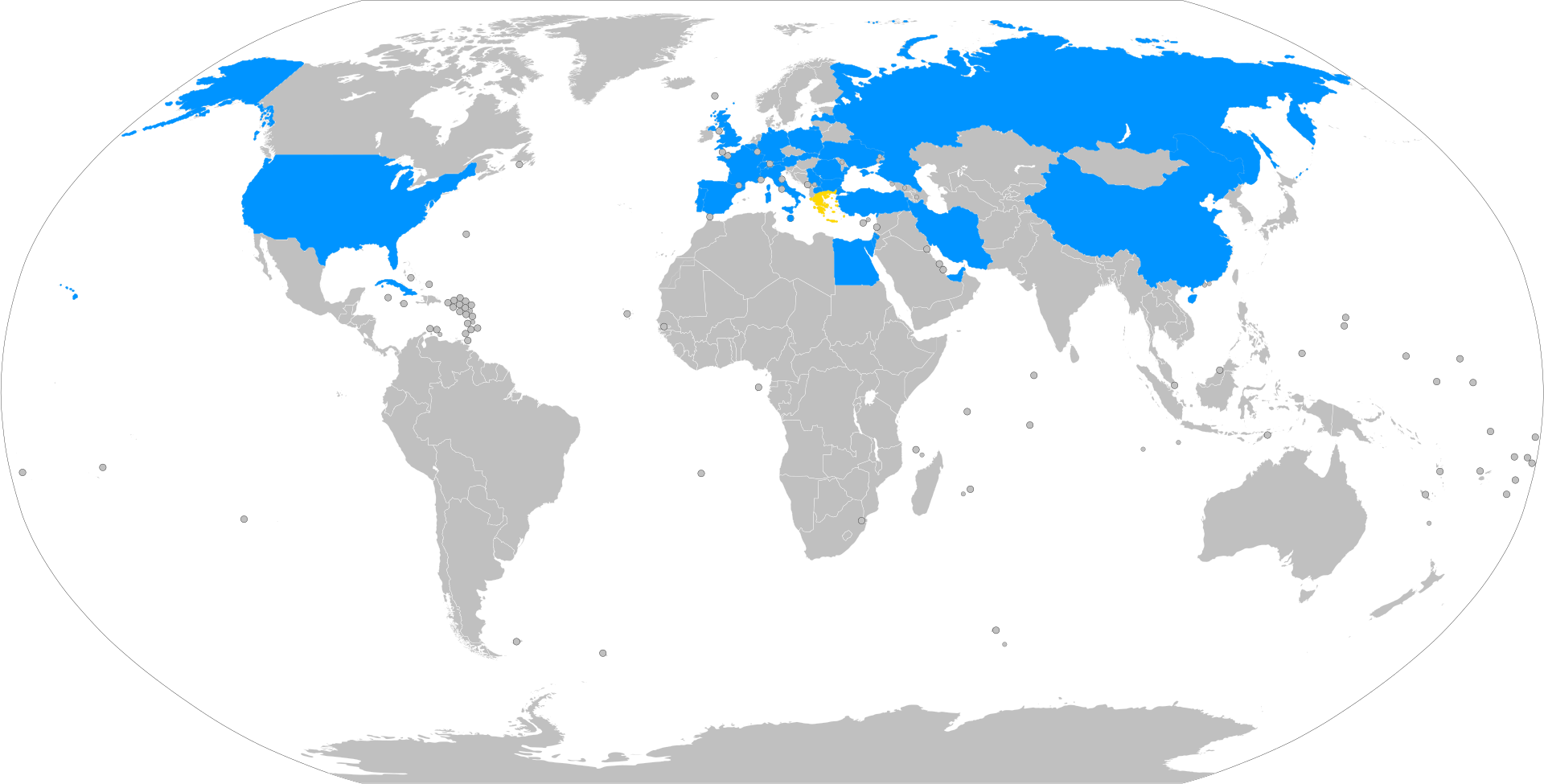
Map of international trips made by Alexis Tsipras as Prime Minister.

Number of visits	Country
32 visits	Belgium
5 visits	Cyprus
4 visits	France
3 visits	Bulgaria, Israel, Italy, Russia, Turkey, United Kingdom, United States
2 visits	Austria, Egypt, Malta, Romania, Serbia, Spain
1 visit	China, Cuba, Germany, Iran, North Macedonia, Latvia, Poland, Portugal, Slovakia, Switzerland, Ukraine, United Arab Emirates, State of Palestine

== 2015 ==
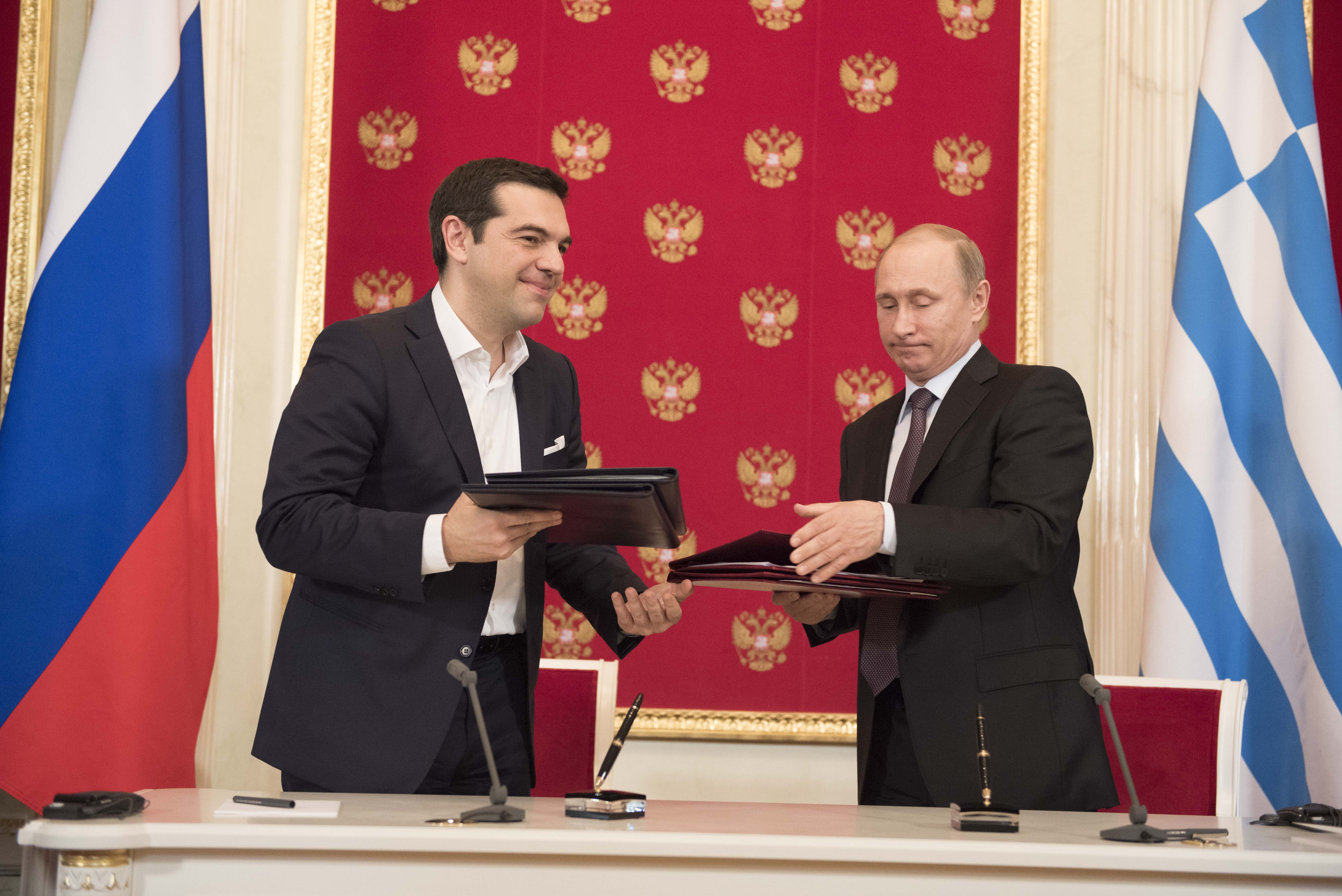
Alexis Tsipras and Russian President Vladimir Putin in Moscow.

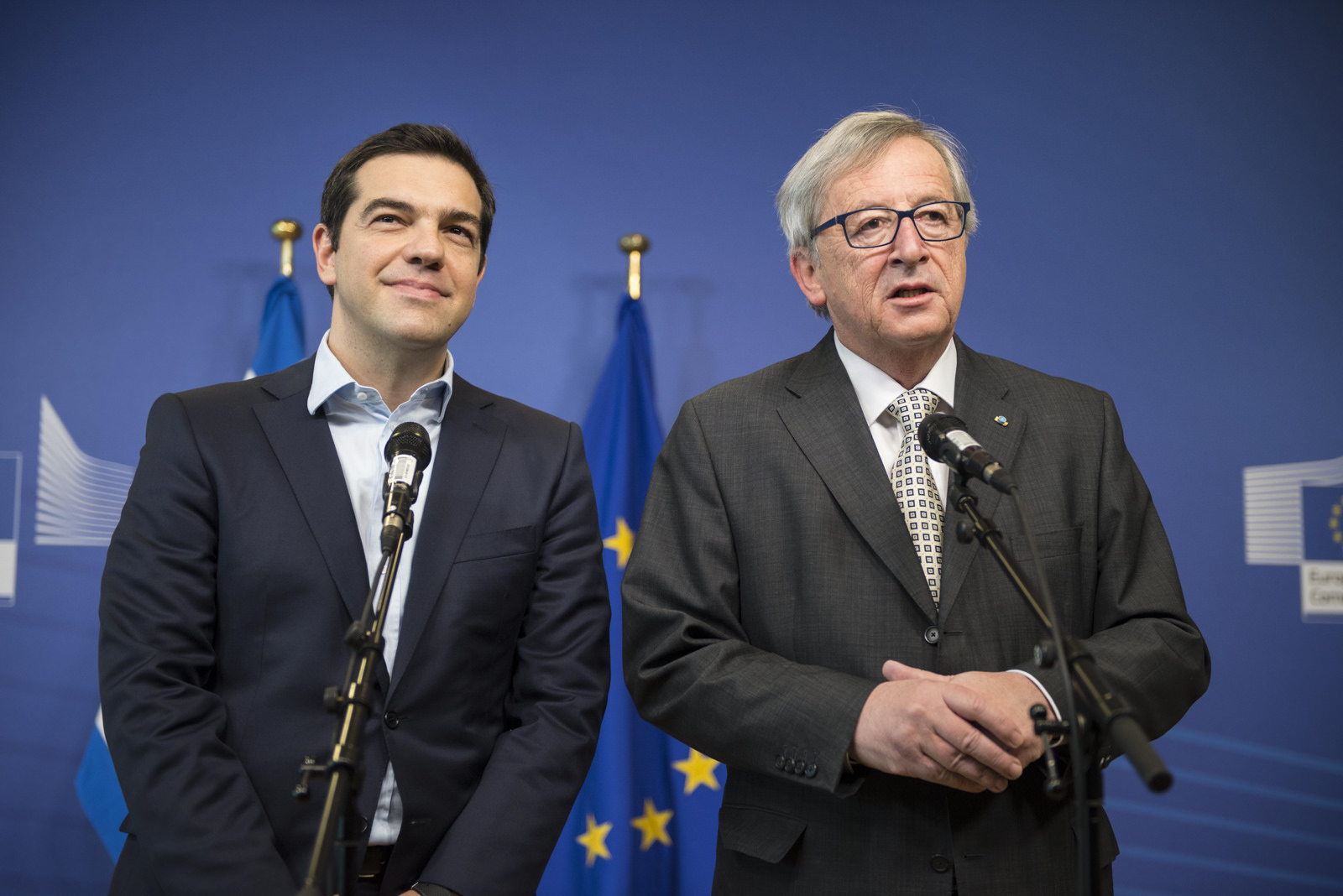
Alexis Tsipras and President of the European Commission Jean-Claude Juncker in Brussels.

Country	Areas visited	Date(s)	Details
Cyprus	Nicosia	2 February	Met with President Nicos Anastasiades. Also, delivered a speech to the Cypriot House of Representatives.
Italy	Rome	3 February	Met with Prime Minister Matteo Renzi.
France	Paris	4 February	Was invited and met with President François Hollande.
Belgium	Brussels	4 February	Met with President of the European Parliament Martin Schulz.
Austria	Vienna	9 February	Met with Chancellor Werner Faymann.
Belgium	Brussels	12-13 February	Joined the unofficial EU summit. Also met with Prime Minister Charles Michel.
Belgium	Brussels	13 March	Met with President of the European Parliament Martin Schulz and President of the European Commission Jean-Claude Juncker.
Germany	Berlin	23-24 March	Met with Chancellor Angela Merkel.
Russia	Moscow	7-9 April	Met with President Vladimir Putin and Prime Minister Dmitry Medvedev.
Belgium	Brussels	23-24 April	Joined the EU summit.
Cyprus	Nicosia	29 April	Joined the summit between Egypt-Greece-Cyprus.
Latvia	Riga	21-22 May	Joined the special EU summit. Also met with President François Hollande and Chancellor Angela Merkel.
Belgium	Brussels	4 June	Met with the President of the European Commission Jean-Claude Juncker.
Belgium	Brussels	10-11 June	Joined the EU-CELAC summit. Met with Angela Merkel, François Hollande, Michelle Bachelet, Dilma Rousseff, Evo Morales and Rafael Correa.
Russia	Saint Petersburg	18-19 June	Met with President Vladimir Putin.
Belgium	Brussels	21-22 June	Joined the emergency meeting of Eurozone. Met with President of the European Commission Jean-Claude Juncker.
Belgium	Brussels	25-26 June	Joined the EU summit.
France	Strasbourg	7-8 July	Delivered a speech in front of the European Parliament.
Belgium	Brussels	8 July	Joined the EU summit.
Belgium	Brussels	12-13 July	Joined the Eurozone summit.
Egypt	Suez	6-7 August	Joined the opening of the expanded Suez Canal. Met with François Hollande, Abdel Fattah el-Sisi, Dmitry Medvedev and Mahmoud Abbas.
USA	New York City	27 September-1 October	Joined the United Nations summit. Met with Rafael Correa, Dilma Rousseff, Xi Jinping, Abdel Fattah Al Sisi, Nicos Anastasiades, Ahmet Davutoğlu and Bill Clinton.
Belgium	Brussels	14-16 October	Joined the EU summit.
Malta	Valletta	13 November	Joined the EU summit.
Turkey	Istanbul Ankara	17-18 November	Met with Bartholomew I, Ahmet Davutoğlu and Recep Tayyip Erdoğan.
Israel	Tel Aviv Jerusalem	25-26 November	Met with President Reuven Rivlin and Prime Minister Benjamin Netanyahu.
Palestine	Jerusalem	26 November	Met with President Mahmoud Abbas.
Belgium	Brussels	29 November	Joined the EU-Turkey summit.
France	Paris	30 November	Joined the U.N. summit for the climate, in which he delivered a speech.
Belgium	Brussels	17-18 December	Joined the EU summit.

== 2016 ==
Country	Areas visited	Date(s)	Details
Switzerland	Davos	20-22 January	Joined the World Economic Forum. Met with the Vice President of the United States Joe Biden.
Israel	Tel Aviv	27-28 January	Joined the Israel-Greece-Cyprus summit.
UK	London	4 February	Joined the Syria Donors Conference. Met with German Chancellor Angela Merkel and Prime Minister of UK David Cameron.
Iran	Teheran	7-8 February	Met with Supreme Leader Ali Khamenei.
Belgium	Brussels	18-20 February	Joined the EU summit.
Turkey	Istanbul	23-24 May	Joined the World Humanitarian Summit.
France	Strasbourg	22 June	Delivered a speech in front of the Council of Europe parliament.
Belgium	Brussels	28-29 June	Joined the EU summit for Brexit.
China	Beijing Shanghai	2-6 July	Met with President Xi Jinping.
Poland	Warsaw	8-9 July	Joined the NATO summit. Met with US President Barack Obama.
Bulgaria	Sofia	1 August	Joined the Greece-Bulgaria summit for cooperation. Met with Prime Minister Boyko Borisov.
Slovakia	Bratislava Castle	16 September	Joined the unofficial EU summit.
USA	New York City	18-23 September	Joined the UN summit.
Austria	Vienna	24 September	Joined the summit for the European migrant crisis.
Egypt	Cairo	11 October	Joined the Egypt-Greece-Cyprus summit.
Belgium	Brussels	19-21 October	Joined the EU summit.
Cuba	Havana	23-25 November	Attended the funeral of Fidel Castro.
UAE	Abu Dhabi	3 December	Joined the World Heritage Protection summit.
Belgium	Brussels	15-16 December	Joined the EU summit.

== 2017 ==
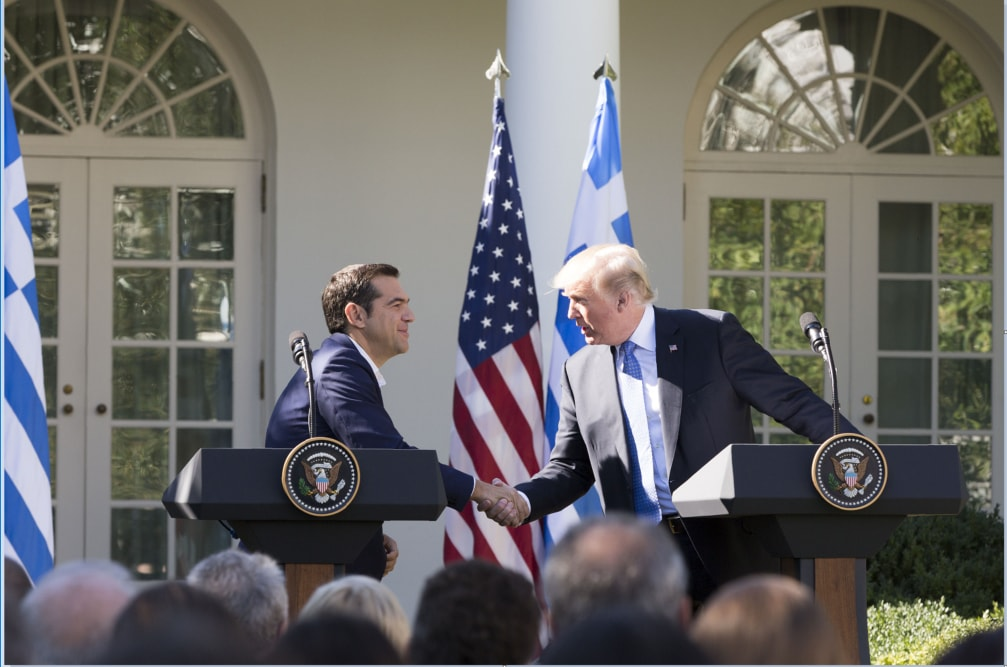
Alexis Tsipras and U.S. President Donald Trump outside the White House.

Country	Areas visited	Date(s)	Details
Portugal	Lisbon	28 January	Joined the 2nd South EU Countries summit.
Serbia	Belgrade	31 January	Met with Prime Minister Aleksandar Vučić and President Tomislav Nikolić.
Ukraine	Kyiv	8-9 February	Met with Prime Minister Volodymyr Groysman and President Petro Poroshenko.
Belgium	Brussels	9-10 March	Joined the EU summit.
Italy	Rome	25 March	Joined the celebrations for the 60th anniversary of the Treaty of Rome.
Spain	Madrid	10 April	Joined the 3rd summit of the South European Countries.
Belgium	Brussels	29 April	Joined the special EU summit.
Belgium	Brussels	22-23 June	Joined the EU summit.
Bulgaria	Varna	3 October	Joined the Greece-Bulgaria-Serbia-Romania summit.
USA	Washington, D.C.	17-19 October	Met with President Donald Trump.
Belgium	Brussels	20 October	Joined the EU summit.
Belgium	Brussels	17-18 November	Joined the EU summit.
Cyprus	Nicosia	21 November	Joined the 5th Egypt-Greece-Cyprus summit. Met with President Nicos Anastasiades.
Serbia	Belgrade	9 December	Joined the 2nd Greece-Bulgaria-Serbia-Romania summit.

== 2018 ==
Country	Areas visited	Date(s)	Details
Italy	Rome	11 January	Joined the 4th South European Countries summit.
Cyprus	Nicosia	16 January	Joined the 1st Greece-Cyprus-Jordan summit.
Belgium	Brussels	24 February	Joined the unofficial EU summit.
Belgium	Brussels	22-23 March	Joined the EU summit.
Romania	Bucharest	24 April	Joined the 3rd Greece-Bulgaria-Serbia-Romania summit.
Bulgaria	Sofia	17 May	Joined the EU-Western Balkans summit.
Belgium	Brussels	24 June	Joined the unofficial EU summit.
UK	London	26-27 June	Met with Prime Minister Theresa May.
Belgium	Brussels	29 June	Joined the EU summit for the refugee crisis.
UK	London	10 July	Joined the summit for the Western Balkans.
Belgium	Brussels	11-12 July	Joined the NATO summit.
Belgium	Brussels	11 September	Delivered a speech in front of the European Parliament. Met with President of the European Parliament Antonio Tajani.
Belgium	Brussels	18-19 October	Joined the EU summit.
Bulgaria	Varna	2 November	Joined the Greece-Bulgaria-Serbia-Romania summit.
Russia	Moscow	7-8 December	Met with President Vladimir Putin.
Belgium	Brussels	13-14 December	Joined the EU summit.
Israel	Beersheba	20 December	Joined the Greece-Cyprus-Israel summit.
Serbia	Belgrade	21-22 December	Joined the Greece-Serbia-Bulgaria-Romania summit.

== 2019 ==
Country	Areas visited	Date(s)	Details
Cyprus	Nicosia	28-29 January	Joined the South European Countries summit.
Turkey	Ankara; Istanbul	5-6 February	Met with President Recep Tayyip Erdoğan.
Belgium	Brussels	22 March	Joined the EU summit.
Romania	Bucharest	29 March	Joined the Greece-Bulgaria-Serbia-Romania summit.
North Macedonia	Skopje	2 April	Met with Prime Minister Zoran Zaev.
Belgium	Brussels	9 May	Joined the unofficial EU summit.
Belgium	Brussels	28 May	Joined the unofficial work dinner of the EU leaders.
Malta	Valletta	14 June	Joined the South European Countries summit.
Belgium	Brussels	20-21 June	Joined the EU summit.
