= Thanasis Theocharopoulos =

Greek agricultural economist and politician

Thanassis Theocharopoulos
- Θανάσης Θεοχαρόπουλος

Minister for Tourism
- In office 4 May 2019 – 9 July 2019
- Preceded by: Elena Kountoura
- Succeeded by: Harry Theocharis
- Prime Minister: Alexis Tsipras

Personal details
- Born: 5 November 1978 (age 47) Veria, Greece
- Party: Democratic Left (DIMAR) (2015-2019); Syriza (2019–)
- Education: Aristotle University of Thessaloniki
- Profession: Agricultural Economist

Thanassis Theocharopoulos (born 5 November 1978, Veria) is an agricultural economist, Greek politician and last chairman of the Democratic Left (DIMAR). In 2019 he served as Tourism Minister for Syriza.

== Early life ==
Thanasis Theocharopoulos was born on 5 November 1978 in Veria. He is an agronomist, doctor of agricultural economics. He has also participated in several European Commission research projects, and has written articles in scientific journals, conferences and scientific books.

He is married to Frida Gazarou, with whom he has two children.

== Political career ==
In the May 2012 legislative election DIMAR received 386,116 votes (6.1%) and elected 19 MPs in the Greek Parliament, making it the seventh biggest party in the Hellenic Parliament. In the June 2012 legislative election, the DIMAR won 6.3% of the vote and 17 seats, making it the sixth largest party by seat count. It joined the Samaras cabinet with New Democracy and PASOK.

On September 10, 2015, he was announced as the leader of the ballot box of the Democratic Coalition, which included PASOK, the Democratic Left and the Citizens' Movements for Social Democracy, for the September 2015 elections. Thanasis Theocharopoulos was elected Member of Parliament in the September 2015 elections and was a parliamentary representative of the Democratic Alliance.

On January 20, 2019, he was expelled from the parliamentary group, as he stated, following a decision of the Central Committee of DIMAR, that he would vote in favor of the Prespa agreement.

On April 6, 2019, DIMAR and its president Thanassis Theocharopoulos affiliated with Syriza, ahead of the 2019 European election. On May 4, 2019, Thanasis Theocharopoulos took over as Minister of Tourism in the Tsipras government. In the parliamentary elections of 2019, he was a candidate with SYRIZA in the B3 'Southern Sector of Athens, he received 13,757 votes but was not elected. In July 2019, he was appointed director of the SYRIZA parliamentary group.
