= Greek Communist Youth – Rigas Feraios =

Communist youth organization in Greece

The Greek Communist Youth "Rigas Feraios" (Greek: Ελληνική Κομμουνιστική Νεολαία «Ρήγας Φεραίος», abbreviated EKON Rigas Feraios, ΕΚΟΝ Ρήγας Φεραίος) was a communist youth organization in Greece. The organization was baptized after Rigas Feraios, a national hero from the Greek War of Independence. EKON Rigas Feraios was the youth wing of the Communist Party of Greece (Interior) and formed the backbone of the party. Rather than being merely a front of the mother party, the Rigas Feraios youth organization exercised significant influence over the party. At its peak, EKON Rigas Feraios had some 15,000-17,000 members.

The Rigas Feraios youth organization was established in 1967, shortly after the beginning of the Regime of the Colonels. It was the first illegal youth organization to emerge after the coup. The organization succeeded the now defunct Lambrakis Democratic Youth (DNL), the founders of Rigas Feraios had belonged to DNL. Rigas Feraios members were active in organizing resistance to the new regime, distributing leaflets and painting anti-junta graffiti around the country. By September 18, 1968 many Rigas Feraios organizers had been arrested by the junta. On October 29, 1968 the Rigas Feraios leadership was put on trial. The defendants were sentenced to jail, with sentences ranging from 5 to 21 years. A failed attempt to initiate low-scale armed struggle was launched with the formation of the 'Aris-Rigas Feraios' armed group.

The Rigas Feraios organization aligned with the New Left, although influenced by Eurocommunism. As the Communist Party of Greece split in 1968, Rigas Feraios became increasingly tied to the Communist Party of Greece (Interior). Rigas Feraios, which took a critical stance of the Soviet Union, would now compete with the pro-Soviet Communist Youth of Greece (KNE) over the influence of the leftwing youth movement in the country. By 1972 Rigas Feraios was the largest youth organization, although KNE eventually outgrew it. EKON Rigas Feraios had a key role in organizing the November 1973 Athens Polytechnic uprising against the military junta. The student wing of EKON Rigas Feraios was known as 'Democratic Struggle-Democratic Unity' (DA-DE). In 1974 DA-DE won 14.6% of the national student vote, in 1975 16.42%, in 1976 17.52%, in 1977 20.94% and in 1978 in 16.7%.

During the 1970s EKON Rigas Feraios underwent period of internal strife, which ended up in a formal split in 1978 as the minority wing formed the B Panelladiki. The influence of EKON Rigas Feraios declined towards the end of the 1970s. In 1979, DA-DE won 7.5% of the national student vote. In 1980 it obtained 8.9% and in 1981 10.1%.
