= Leonidas Kyrkos =

Greek politician

- Λεωνίδας Κύρκος
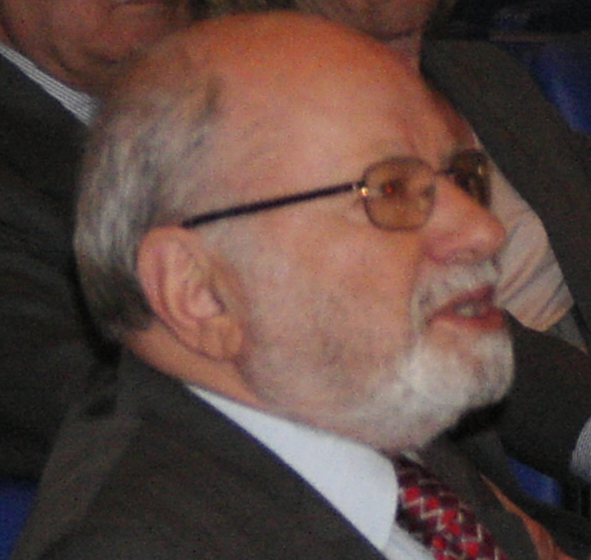

Member of the European Parliament for Greece
- In office 1984–1989
- In office 1981–1984

Personal details
- Born: October 12, 1924 Heraklion, Greece
- Died: August 28, 2011 (aged 86) Athens, Greece
- Party: United Democratic Left (–1968); KKE-Interior (1968–1987); Greek Left (1987–1992); Synaspismos (1991–2010); Democratic Left (2010–2011)
- Children: Miltos Kyrkos
- Parent: Michail Kyrkos

Leonidas Kyrkos (Greek: Λεωνίδας Κύρκος; 12 October 1924 – 28 August 2011) was a Greek leftist politician and member of the Hellenic Parliament and the European Parliament.

== Life ==
Leonidas Kyrkos was born in Heraklion, Crete, to Greek politician Michail Kyrkos, who went on to, along with Ioannis Pasalidis, form the United Democratic Left in 1951.

In his teens, Kyrkos joined the communist youth and in 1941, he joined the resistance against the German occupiers. He enrolled in Human medicine at the University of Athens but never came to graduate. In the Greek Civil War following Greece's liberation in 1944, Kyrkos was arrested for his membership in the Communist Party and was sentenced to death. Only international pressure helped him and a number of his comrades survive and eventually become free in 1953. He later worked as a journalist and from 1958 on as one of the editors of leftist newspaper I Avgi.

Kyrkos was elected MP to the Hellenic Parliament in the elections of 1961, 1963 and 1964. On 21 April 1967, during the coup d'état that installed the military junta, he was arrested and remained imprisoned for five years. After the restoration of democracy in 1974, he was elected MP in 1974 and 1977, and MEP in 1981 and 1984.

Kyrkos held the posts of president and general secretary of the Communist Party of Greece (Interior) until April 1987, when he left to become president of the Greek Left party. Along with Charilaos Florakis, leader of the Communist Party of Greece, he founded the Coalition of the Left and Progress (Synaspismós), of which was secretary until March 1991. He was an MP for the coalition from 1989 to 1993. In 2000, his party nominated him in the election for the position of President of Greece. In 2010, he offered his support in a letter for the Democratic Left.

Kyrkos died aged 86 on 28 August 2011, after a long illness. His funeral took place at the First Cemetery of Athens on August 31.

His son Miltos Kyrkos in 2014 was elected Member of the European Parliament for the party To Potami.
