= Eurocommunism =

Western European political ideology

Eurocommunism was a trend in the 1970s and 1980s within various Western European communist parties, which said that they had developed a theory and practice of social transformation more relevant for Western Europe than Marxism–Leninism. During the Cold War, they sought to reject the influence of the Soviet Union and its Communist Party. The trend was prominent in Italy, Spain, and, to a lesser extent, France. It is commonly considered to have been prompted by the Prague Spring. Although the various parties converged against the Soviet factor, their own doctrines remained as different at the dissolution of the movement as they originally were before 1968.

== Terminology ==
The origin of the term Eurocommunism was subject to great debate in the mid-1970s, being attributed to Zbigniew Brzezinski and Arrigo Levi, among others. Jean-François Revel once wrote that "one of the favourite amusements of 'political scientists' is to search for the author of the term Eurocommunism". In April 1977, Deutschland Archiv decided that the word was first used in the summer of 1975 by Croatian journalist Frane Barbieri, former editor of Belgrade's NIN news magazine. Outside Western Europe, it is sometimes referred to as neocommunism. This theory stresses greater independence from the Soviet Union.

== History ==
=== Background ===
==== Theoretical foundation and inspirations ====
According to Perry Anderson, the main theoretical foundation of Eurocommunism was Antonio Gramsci's writing about Marxist theory which questioned the sectarianism of the left and encouraged communist parties to develop social alliances to win hegemonic support for social reforms. Early inspirations can also be found in Austro-Marxism and the democratic road to socialism.

Eurocommunist parties expressed their fidelity to democratic institutions and attempted to widen their appeal by embracing public sector middle-class workers, new social movements such as feminism and gay liberation and more publicly questioning the Soviet Union. However, Eurocommunism did not go as far as the Anglosphere-centred New Left movement which had originally borrowed from the French nouvelle gauche, but in the course of the events went past their academic theorists, largely abandoning Marxist historical materialism, class struggle and its traditional institutions such as communist parties.

==== Legacy of the Prague Spring ====
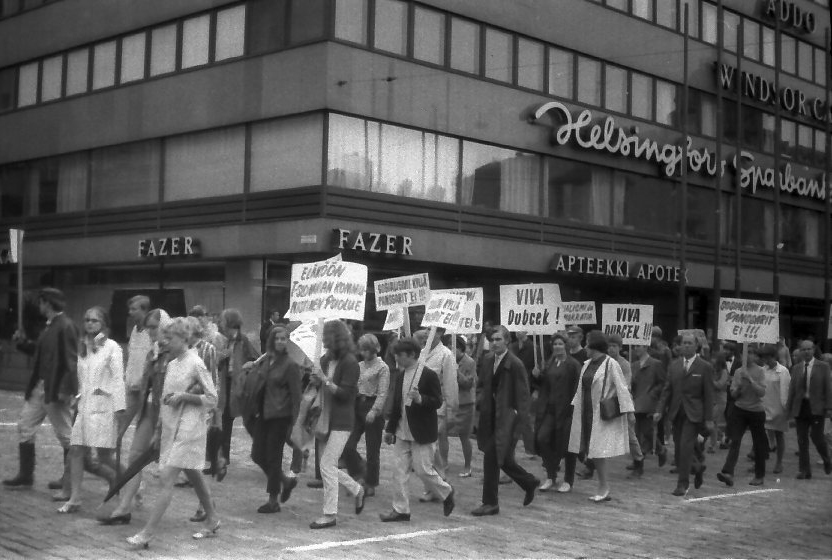
A demonstration in Helsinki against the 1968 Soviet invasion of Czechoslovakia

The Prague Spring and particularly its crushing by the Soviet Union in 1968 became a turning point for the communist world. Romanian leader Nicolae Ceaușescu staunchly criticized the Soviet invasion in a speech, explicitly declaring his support for the Czechoslovak leadership under Alexander Dubček. While the Portuguese Communist Party, the South African Communist Party and the Communist Party USA supported the Soviet position, the Italian Communist Party (PCI) and the Communist Party of Spain (PCE) firmly denounced the occupation.

The leadership of the Communist Party of Finland (SKP), the Swedish Left Communist Party (VPK) and the French Communist Party (PCF) which had pleaded for conciliation expressed their disapproval about the Soviet intervention, with the PCF thereby publicly criticizing a Soviet action for the first time in its history. The Communist Party of Greece (KKE) suffered a major split over the internal disputes regarding the Prague Spring, with the pro-Dubček faction breaking ties with the Soviet leadership and founding the KKE Interior. KKE's legal branch United Democratic Left (EDA) adopted a more moderate and democratic line over the years and was also described as Eurocommunist.

The emergence of Eurocommunism is often linked to the events in 1968. However this fails to explain the realignment between European communist parties and the Soviet Union from 1968 up to the early 1970s.

=== Early developments ===
==== Developments in Western European communist parties ====
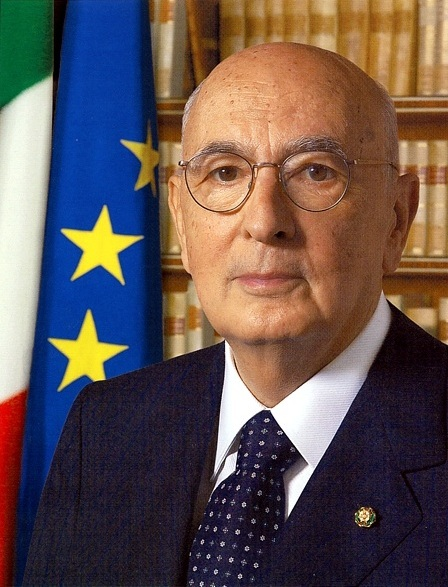
Giorgio Napolitano, prominent figure of the Italian Communist Party (until 1991) and President of Italy from 2006 to 2015

At least one mass party, the French PCF, as well as many smaller parties opposed Eurocommunism and stayed aligned to the positions of the Communist Party of the Soviet Union until the end of the Soviet Union, although the PCF did make a brief turn toward Eurocommunism in the mid-to-late 1970s. Some communist parties with strong popular support, notably the PCI and the PCE, adopted Eurocommunism most enthusiastically. The SKP was dominated by Eurocommunists.

The Finnish SKP changed its leadership in 1965 with leadership post changing from the Stalinist Aimo Aaltonen, who had even a picture of Lavrentiy Beria in his office, to a revisionist, quite popular trade unionist Aarne Saarinen. The same happened even more drastically when the Finnish People's Democratic League also changed its leadership with the reformist Ele Alenius leading it. In 1968, these were the only parties to directly oppose the actions of the Soviet militarship in Prague in 1968, therefore the two organizations split de facto into two different parties, with one reformist and one hard-line Soviet. The latter movement was also called Taistoism after its leader Taisto Sinisalo.

Progress was hard to make as the party accorded that the Taistoist movement had equal rights of power in the party, although it was a minority and the vast majority of the party was Eurocommunist. In 1984, with a strong Eurocommunist majority the hard-line organizations were massively expelled from the already weakened party. The Taistoist faction broke away, calling the main party revisionist and founded the Communist Party of Finland (Unity) (SKPy). Pro-Soviet hard-liners from SKPy formed their own cover-organization called Democratic Alternative. In 1990, the new Left Alliance integrated the parties, but Alenius chose not to be member of it because they also took hard-line Taistoists.

The Spanish PCE and its Catalan referent, the United Socialist Party of Catalonia, had already been committed to the liberal possibilist politics of the Popular Front during the Spanish Civil War. The PCE's leader Santiago Carrillo wrote Eurocommunism's defining book Eurocomunismo y estado (Eurocommunism and the State [1977]) and participated in the development of the liberal democratic constitution as Spain emerged from the dictatorship of Francisco Franco. The People's Alliance in Iceland, the Sammarinese Communist Party, the Communist Party of Austria, the Communist Party of Belgium, the Communist Party of Great Britain, the Socialist Party of Ireland and the Communist Party of the Netherlands also turned Eurocommunist to varying degrees.

The Danish Socialist People's Party, which already broke away from the Communist Party of Denmark after the Hungarian Revolution of 1956, was also sometimes described as Eurocommunist. The eurocommunist wing of NKP leader Reidar T. Larsen joined the Socialist Left Party. The Communist Party of Belgium flirted with Eurocommunism in the 1970s, but did not want to explicitly reject the Soviet model and engaged in a polemic with Carrillo for this reason. It also remained more critical towards the idea of a Western European power bloc. The main radical-left force in Belgium that rejected the Soviet model at the time was AMADA (the forerunner of the PVDA-PTB), but it did this from a Maoist viewpoint about Soviet "social imperialism", while also denouncing Eurocommunism.

The Italian PCI in particular had been developing an independent line from Moscow for many years prior which had already been exhibited in 1968, when the party refused to support the Soviet invasion of Prague. In 1975, the PCI and the PCE had made a declaration regarding the "march toward socialism" to be done in "peace and freedom". In 1976, the PCI's leader Enrico Berlinguer had spoken of a "pluralistic system" (sistema pluralistico translated by the interpreter as "multiform system") in Moscow and in front of 5,000 communist delegates described the PCI's intentions to build "a socialism that we believe necessary and possible only in Italy". The Historic Compromise (compromesso storico) with the Christian Democracy, stopped by the kidnapping and murder of Aldo Moro in 1978, was a consequence of this new policy.

Western European communists came to Eurocommunism via a variety of routes. For some, it was their direct experience of feminist and similar action, while for others it was a reaction to the political events of the Soviet Union at the apogee of what Mikhail Gorbachev later called the Era of Stagnation. This process was accelerated after the events of 1968, particularly the crushing of the Prague Spring. The politics of détente also played a part. With war less likely, Western communists were under less pressure to follow Soviet orthodoxy, yet also wanted to engage with a rise in Western proletarian militancy such as Italy's Hot Autumn and Britain's Shop Stewards Movement.

=== Further development ===
Eurocommunism was in many ways only a staging ground for changes in the political structure of the European left. Some, like the Italians, became social democrats, with the Democratic Party of the Left, while others, like the Dutch, moved into green politics and the French party during the 1980s reverted to a more pro-Soviet stance. Eurocommunism became a force across Europe in 1977, when the PCI's Enrico Berlinguer, the PCE's Santiago Carrillo and the PCF's Georges Marchais met in Madrid and laid out the fundamental lines of the "new way".

Eurocommunist ideas won at least partial acceptance outside of Western Europe. Prominent parties influenced by it outside of Europe were the Israeli Communist Party, the Communist Party of Australia, the Japanese Communist Party, the Mexican Communist Party, their successor the Unified Socialist Party of Mexico, and the Venezuelan Movement for Socialism. Soviet leader Mikhail Gorbachev also referred to Eurocommunism as a key influence on the ideas of glasnost and perestroika in his memoirs.

==== Soviet dissolution ====
The breakup of the Soviet Union and the end of the Cold War put practically all leftist parties in Europe on the defensive and made neoliberal reforms the order of the day. Many Eurocommunist parties split, with the right factions (such as the Democrats of the Left or the Initiative for Catalonia Greens) adopting social democracy more whole-heartedly while the left strove to preserve some identifiably communist positions (the Communist Refoundation Party or the PCE and the Living Unified Socialist Party of Catalonia). The successors of KKE Interior, Renewing Communist Ecological Left (AKOA) and Greek Left (EAR), alongside other left-wing groups and politicians including EDA's last leader Manolis Glezos would go on and form Synaspismos.

In 2017, the Communist Party of Spain nominally returned to Marxism–Leninism.

== Criticism ==
Several criticisms have been advanced against Eurocommunism. First, it is alleged by critics that Eurocommunists showed a lack of courage in sufficiently and definitively breaking off from the Soviet Union (for example, the Italian Communist Party took this step in 1981 after the repression of Solidarność in Poland). This has been explained as the fear of losing old members and supporters, many of whom admired the Soviet Union, or with a pragmatic desire to keep the support of a strong and powerful country.

Other critics point out the difficulties the Eurocommunist parties had in developing a clear and recognisable strategy. They observe that Eurocommunists have always claimed to be different—not only from Soviet communism, but also from social democracy—while in practice they were always very similar to at least one of these two tendencies. As a result, critics argue that Eurocommunism does not have a well-defined identity and cannot be regarded as a separate movement in its own right.

From a Trotskyist point of view in From Stalinism to Eurocommunism: The Bitter Fruits of 'Socialism in One Country', Ernest Mandel views Eurocommunism as a subsequent development of the decision taken by the Soviet Union in 1924 to abandon the goal of world revolution and concentrate on social and economic development of the Soviet Union, the doctrine of socialism in one country. According to this vision, the Eurocommunists of the Italian and French communist parties are considered to be nationalist movements, who together with the Soviet Union abandoned internationalism.

From an anti-revisionist point of view, Enver Hoxha argued in Eurocommunism is Anti-Communism that Eurocommunism is the result of Nikita Khrushchev's policy of peaceful coexistence. Khrushchev was accused of being a revisionist who encouraged conciliation with the bourgeoisie rather than adequately calling for its overthrow by the dictatorship of the proletariat. He also stated that the Soviet Union's refusal to reject Palmiro Togliatti's theory of polycentrism encouraged the various pro-Soviet communist parties to moderate their views in order to join cabinets which in turn forced them to abandon Marxism–Leninism as their leading ideology.

Henry Kissinger opposed the idea that communist parties in power in western Europe could be acceptable for the United States if they are independent from Moscow stating how "Tito is not under Moscow's control, yet his influence is felt all over the world" warning how a West European, communist ruled country, may potentially lead to "total redefinition" of the post-World War II order.

== See also ==
- American socialism
- Anarchist communism – Political school of thought
- Austromarxism – Worldview reconciling nationalism and social democracy with Marxism
- Communist party – Political party that promotes communist philosophy and values
- Democratic capitalism – Political and economic system
- Democratic socialism – Political philosophy
- Enrico Berlinguer – Italian communist politician (1922–1984)
- Freudo-Marxism – Philosophical perspectives informed by Freud and Marx
- Left communism – Left-wing variant of communism
- Left-libertarianism – Political philosophy
- Libertarian socialism – Political philosophy
- Marxist humanism – School of Marxism aligned with humanist philosophies
- New Times (politics) – Western Communist intellectual movement and ideology
- Popular socialism (Nordic countries) – Type of socialist ideology
- Social democracy – Centre-left political ideology
- Socialism in Canada
- Solidarity unionism – Model of labor organizing
- Western Marxism – Current of Marxist theory
- Yugo-nostalgia – Nostalgia for Yugoslavia among ex-Yugoslav populations
