= Communist Party of Greece (Interior) =

Communist Party of Greece (Interior) Κομμουνιστικό Κόμμα Ελλάδας Εσωτερικού
- Abbreviation: KKE Interior
- General Secretary: Babis Drakopoulos (1969-1982); Yiannis Banias(1982-1986); Leonidas Kyrkos (1986-1987)
- Founded: 1968
- Dissolved: 1987
- Split from: Communist Party of Greece
- Succeeded by: Greek Left; KKE Interior–Renewing Left
- Headquarters: Athens
- Newspaper: I Avgi
- Youth wing: Greek Communist Youth – Rigas Feraios
- Ideology: Eurocommunism
- Political position: Left-wing to far-left

Party flag
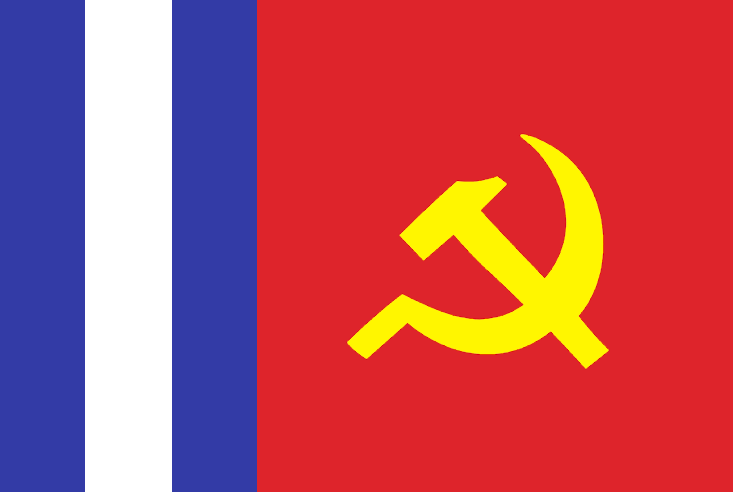

The Communist Party of Greece – Interior (Greek: Κομμουνιστικό Κόμμα Ελλάδας Εσωτερικού), usually abbreviated as KKE Interior (ΚΚΕ Εσωτερικού or ΚΚΕ εσ.; KKE int.), was a Eurocommunist party existing between 1968 and 1987 in Greece.

The party was formed after the Communist Party of Greece (KKE) suffered a major split following the 1968 Warsaw Pact invasion of Czechoslovakia and the suppression of the Prague Spring. KKE Interior essentially broke ties with KKE's ideological supervision by the Communist Party of the Soviet Union and later established bonds with parties such as the Italian Communist Party (PCI), adopting a Eurocommunist perspective.

KKE Interior was greatly active in the struggle against the Regime of the Colonels that ruled Greece from 1967 to 1974 through the Panhellenic Antidictatorial Front (Πανελλήνιο Αντιδικτατορικό Μέτωπο, abbrev. ΠΑΜ) and its youth wing, the Greek Communist Youth – Rigas Feraios. During the period that followed the overturn of the Regime of the Colonels, known as the Metapolitefsi, the party remained electorally active, either on its own or in broader leftist coalitions. KKE Interior was dissolved some months after its 4th Congress in 1986, splitting into two: the Communist Party of Greece (Interior)-Renewing Left and the Greek Left. Through different routes, both would end up part of the Coalition of the Radical Left (SYRIZA).

== Notable members ==
- Nicos Poulantzas

== Electoral results ==
Results from 1977 to 1985 (year links to election page)
Year	Parliament	Votes	%	Seats
1977	Hellenic Parliament	139,356	2.72	2
1981	European Parliament	275,731	5.15	1
1981	Hellenic Parliament	76,404	1.34	0
1984	European Parliament	203,813	3.42	1
1985	Hellenic Parliament	117,135	1.8	1
