= Democratic Left (Greece) =

Greek political party

Democratic Left Δημοκρατική Αριστερά (ΔΗΜΑΡ) Dimokratiki Aristera (DIMAR)
- Abbreviation: DIMAR
- Leader: Thanasis Theocharopoulos
- Founded: 27 June 2010
- Dissolved: June 2022
- Split from: Synaspismós
- Merged into: Syriza
- Headquarters: Plateia Viktorias 5, 10 434 Athens
- Ideology: Social democracy; Pro-Europeanism
- Political position: Centre-left to left-wing
- National affiliation: DISI (2015–2017); KINAL (2017–2019); SYRIZA (from 2019)

Website
- www.dim-ar.gr

Democratic Left (Greek: Δημοκρατική Αριστερά (ΔΗΜ.ΑΡ.), Dimokratiki Aristera, DIMAR) was a social-democratic political party in Greece. Formed as a split from Synaspismós, DIMAR was a minor party supporting the Samaras cabinet from 21 June 2012 to 21 June 2013. After being a member of the Democratic Alignment (DISI) and the Movement for Change (KINAL), it affiliated to Syriza in 2019. The party was dissolved in 2022.

== History ==
=== Foundation ===
DIMAR was founded on 27 June 2010 when the Renewal Wing platform of the left-wing party Synaspismós, a component of the Coalition of the Radical Left (Syriza)—among them MPs Fotis Kouvelis, Thanasis Leventis, Nikos Tsoukalis, and Grigoris Psarianos—exited Synaspismós at its 6th congress. They were joined by more than 550 individuals. At a subsequent national conference of the Renewal Wing, 170 members were elected to national policy committee of the new party.

The first conference of DIMAR was held on 31 March – 3 April 2011. It elected Fotis Kouvelis as the party's leader with 97.31% of the vote.

On 22 March 2012, six MPs from the Panhellenic Socialist Movement (PASOK) joined the party, which raised the number of Democratic Left MPs to 10, the party was eligible to form a parliamentary group. The minor party Free Citizens also joined the Democratic Left on 22 March 2012.

=== 2012 elections and governing coalition ===
In the May 2012 legislative election DIMAR received 386,116 votes (6.1%) and elected 19 MPs in the Greek Parliament, making it the seventh biggest party in the Hellenic Parliament. In the June 2012 legislative election, the DIMAR won 6.3% of the vote and 17 seats, making it the sixth largest party by seat count. It joined the Samaras cabinet with New Democracy (ND) and PASOK.

In November 2012, the party decided to vote abstained/present to the labor market reform and "Midterm fiscal plan 2013-16" as part of the sixth austerity package negotiated with the Troika, while they cast a supportive vote for the "Fiscal budget 2013". As the party did not vote directly against the crucial reforms, it was afterwards possible to continue being a part of the three-party coalition government with New Democracy and PASOK. Following this political line however came at the price. Three of its MPs voted against the party line on the reforms, and consequently were asked to leave the party, thus reducing the party's number of MPs from 17 to 14. Democratic Left’s political charter has no paragraphs enabling for the exclusion of MPs from the party, but the three MPs being asked to leave were expected to follow the request, as they fundamentally disagreed with the party's political line.

In April 2013, two former Democratic Left MPs, Odysseas Voudouris and Paris Moutsinas, were expelled from DIMAR's parliamentary group after having voted against the coalition government's seventh austerity package. They announced to form a new party, stating in a letter to party leader Fotis Kouvelis that their former party had "mutated" into a centrist one.

=== Back in opposition ===
On 21 June 2013, DIMAR left the governing coalition with ND and PASOK in protest of the unilateral closure of the state broadcasting corporation, Hellenic Broadcasting Corporation (ERT) which was opposed by both DIMAR and PASOK. The withdrawal left Samaras with a tiny majority with 153 New Democracy/PASOK MPs.

In the 2014 European elections on 25 May 2014, DIMAR's vote collapsed, with the party receiving less than one fifth of the popular support it had in the national elections two years before (1.20%, down from 6.25%) and failing to win any seats in the European Parliament.

=== 2015 legislative elections ===
On 4 January 2015 DIMAR announced it would contest the upcoming election in cooperation with the Greens. In the 25 January 2015 legislative election, the joint electoral list received a mere 0.49% of the vote, thus failing to return any DIMAR MPs to the Hellenic Parliament.

On 30 August 2015, ahead of the forthcoming September snap election, PASOK announced an electoral pact with DIMAR, named the Democratic Coalition.

In the September 2015 legislative election on 20 September 2015, the PASOK–DIMAR list received 6.3% of the vote, and returned 17 seats.

=== Opposition ===
DIMAR was one of the founding members of the Movement for Change (KINAL) in March 2018. However, DIMAR left KINAL in January 2019.

In April 2019, DIMAR affiliated with Syriza, ahead of the 2019 European election.

== Election results ==
=== Hellenic Parliament ===
Election	Hellenic Parliament					Rank	Government	Leader
Election	Votes	%	±pp	Seats won	+/−	Rank	Government	Leader
May 2012	386,394	6.1%	New	19 / 300	▲19	#7	Opposition	Fotis Kouvelis
June 2012	384,986	6.2%	+0.1	17 / 300	▼2	#6	Coalition gov't ND-PASOK-DIMAR	Fotis Kouvelis
January 2015	30,074	0.5%	-5.7	0 / 300	▼17	#13	No seats	Fotis Kouvelis
September 2015	w. Democratic Coalition			1 / 300	▲1	#4	Opposition	Thanasis Theocharopoulos

=== European Parliament ===
European Parliament
Election	Votes	%	±pp	Seats won	+/−	Rank	Leader
2014	68,873	1.2%	New	0 / 21	±0	#10	Fotis Kouvelis
