= Alexis Tsipras =

Prime Minister of Greece (2015; 2015–2019)

- Aλέξης Τσίπρας
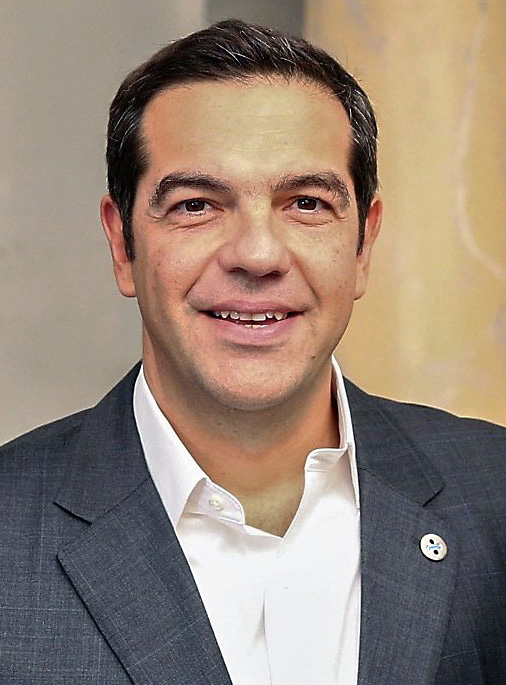
- Tsipras in 2017

Prime Minister of Greece
- In office 21 September 2015 – 8 July 2019
- President: Prokopis Pavlopoulos
- Deputy: Yannis Dragasakis
- Preceded by: Vassiliki Thanou-Christophilou (caretaker)
- Succeeded by: Kyriakos Mitsotakis
- In office 26 January 2015 – 27 August 2015
- President: Karolos Papoulias; Prokopis Pavlopoulos
- Deputy: Yannis Dragasakis
- Preceded by: Antonis Samaras
- Succeeded by: Vassiliki Thanou-Christophilou (caretaker)
Other political offices
Leader of the Opposition
In office 26 June 2023 – 29 June 2023
Prime Minister	Kyriakos Mitsotakis
Preceded by	Himself (May 2023)
Succeeded by	Sokratis Famellos
In office 8 July 2019 – 25 May 2023
Prime Minister	Kyriakos Mitsotakis
Preceded by	Kyriakos Mitsotakis
Succeeded by	Himself (June 2023)
In office 20 June 2012 – 26 January 2015
Prime Minister	Antonis Samaras
Preceded by	Antonis Samaras (May 2012)
Succeeded by	Antonis Samaras
President of Syriza
In office 7 October 2009 – 29 June 2023
Preceded by	Alekos Alavanos
Succeeded by	Stefanos Kasselakis
Vice President of the Party of the European Left
In office 5 December 2010 – 18 December 2016
President	Pierre Laurent
Acting Minister for Foreign Affairs
In office 20 October 2018 – 15 February 2019
Prime Minister	Himself
Preceded by	Nikos Kotzias
Succeeded by	Georgios Katrougalos
President of Synaspismos
In office 10 February 2008 – 10 July 2013
Preceded by	Alekos Alavanos
Succeeded by	Party abolished
Member of the Hellenic Parliament
In office 4 October 2009 – 6 October 2025
Constituency	Athens A (2009–2015); Heraklion (2015–2019); Achaea (2019–2023); Piraeus A (2023–2025)

President of ELAS
- Incumbent
- Assumed office 26 May 2026
- Preceded by: Office established

Personal details
- Born: 28 July 1974 (age 52) Athens, Greece
- Party: Greek Left Alliance (2026–present)
- Other political affiliations: Communist Party of Greece (1988–1991); Synaspismos (1991–2013); Syriza (2009–2025)
- Domestic partner: Peristera Baziana
- Children: 2
- Education: National Technical University of Athens
- Occupation: Politician; civil engineer
- Website: intsipras.gr

Alexis Tsipras (Greek: Αλέξης Τσίπρας [aˈleksis ˈt͡sipras]; born 28 July 1974) is a Greek politician who served as Prime Minister of Greece from 2015 to 2019. He is the founder and leader of the Greek Left Alliance political party. A prominent leftist figure, Tsipras served as the leader of the Greek political party Syriza (Coalition of the Radical Left) from 2008 to 2023. Tsipras is the fourth prime minister who has governed in the course of the 2010s Greek government-debt crisis. Originally an outspoken critic of the austerity policies implemented during the crisis, his tenure in office was marked by an intense austerity policy, mostly in the context of the third EU bailout to Greece (2015–18).

Born in Athens in 1974, Tsipras joined the Communist Youth of Greece in the late 1980s and in the 1990s was politically active in student protests against education reform plans, becoming the movement's spokesperson. He studied civil engineering at the National Technical University of Athens, graduating in 2000, and later undertook post-graduate studies in urban and regional planning. He worked as a civil engineer in the construction industry, based primarily in Athens. From 1999 to 2003, Tsipras served as the secretary of Synaspismos Youth. He was elected as a member of the Central Committee of Synaspismos in 2004 and later the Political Secretariat. In the 2006 local election, he ran as Syriza's candidate for Mayor of Athens, winning 10.5%. In 2008, he was elected as leader of Syriza, succeeding Alekos Alavanos. He was first elected to the Hellenic Parliament representing Athens A in the 2009 election and was re-elected in May and June 2012, subsequently becoming Leader of the Opposition and appointing his own shadow cabinet.

In January 2015, Tsipras led Syriza to victory in a snap legislative election, winning 149 out of 300 seats in the Hellenic Parliament and forming a coalition with the Independent Greeks. On 20 August 2015, seven months into his term as prime minister he lost his majority after intraparty defections after the 2015 Greek bailout referendum, announced his resignation, and called for a snap election to take place the following month. In the September 2015 election that followed, Tsipras led Syriza to another victory, winning 145 out of 300 seats and re-forming the coalition with the Independent Greeks. As prime minister, he oversaw negotiations regarding the Greek government-debt crisis, initiated the Greek bailout referendum, responded to the European migrant crisis, and signed the Prespa agreement. In 2015, he was named by Time as one of the 100 most influential people globally. By 2017, he was on the same magazine's list of the least popular (less than 40% approval rating) heads of government in the world.

After the double defeat of Syriza in both the May and the June 2023 snap elections, Tsipras decided to resign on 29 June 2023. In his resignation statement, he stressed that Syriza had come full circle and that the party needs a profound renewal in order to be able to regain its credibility among citizens, stating: "It would be hypocritical of me to propose the need for a process of profound renewal and refoundation only with my words, if I do not serve it at the same time with my attitude..." In October 2025, he resigned from his post as Syriza MP, and through this move heralded the founding of a new political party. In November 2025, Gutenberg Publications published his political autobiography titled Ithaca. In May 2026, he founded the Greek Left Alliance political party.

== Early life and career ==
Alexios (Alexis) Tsipras was born 28 July 1974 in Athens. His father, Pavlos, was from Athamania in Epirus and was a well-off public works contractor, while his mother, Aristi, was born in Eleftheroupoli, a town in Greek Macedonia. His maternal grandparents were from the village of Babaeski, Eastern Thrace, Turkey and moved to Eleftheroupoli as a result of the 1923 population exchange between Greece and Turkey.

Tsipras joined the Communist Youth of Greece in the late 1980s. In the early 1990s, as a student at Ampelokipoi Multi-disciplinary High School, he was politically active in the student uprising and the school occupations against the controversial law of Education Minister Vasilis Kontogiannopoulos. He rose to prominence as a representative of the student movement when he was featured as a guest on a television show hosted by journalist Anna Panagiotarea. During the interview, Panagiotarea implied that Tsipras was being disingenuous in defending middle and high school students' right to absenteeism without parental notification in the context of protests. Newspapers and opposition politicians contrasted his early activism for the free state education to his choice to enroll his children in private schools when he became prime-minister.

Tsipras studied civil engineering at the National Technical University of Athens, graduating in 2000, before undertaking postgraduate studies in Urban and Regional Planning following an inter-departmental MPhil at the School of Architecture of NTUA. Alongside his postgraduate studies, he began working as a civil engineer in the construction industry. He wrote three studies and projects on the theme of the city of Athens.

As a university student, Tsipras joined the ranks of the renascent left-wing movement, particularly the "Enceladus" (Greek: Εγκέλαδος) group, and as member of it, he was elected to the executive board of the students' union of the Civil Engineering School of NTUA and also served as student representative on the University Senate. From 1995 to 1997 he was an elected member of the Central Council of the National Students Union of Greece (EFEE).

== Political career ==
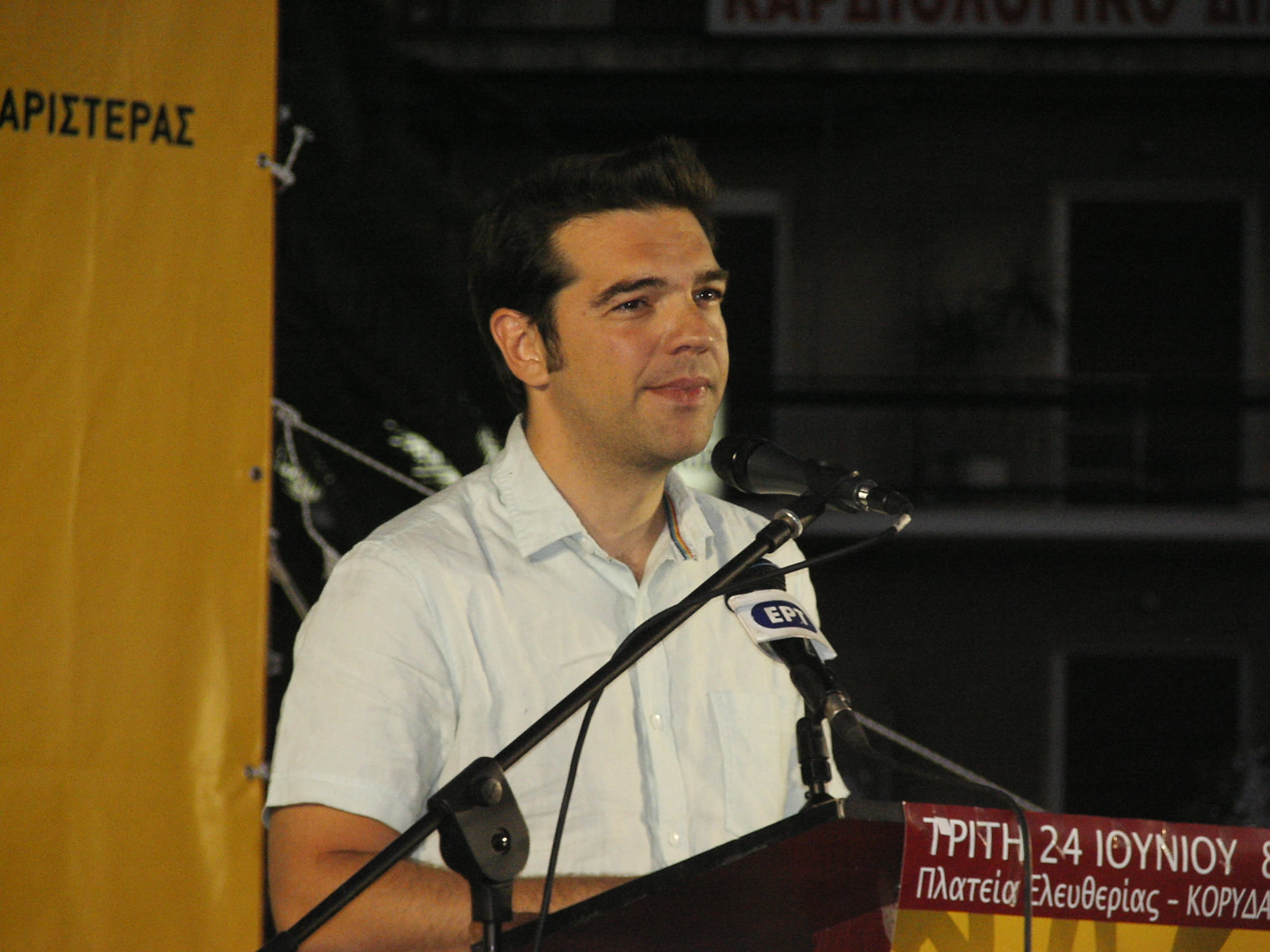
Tsipras in 2008

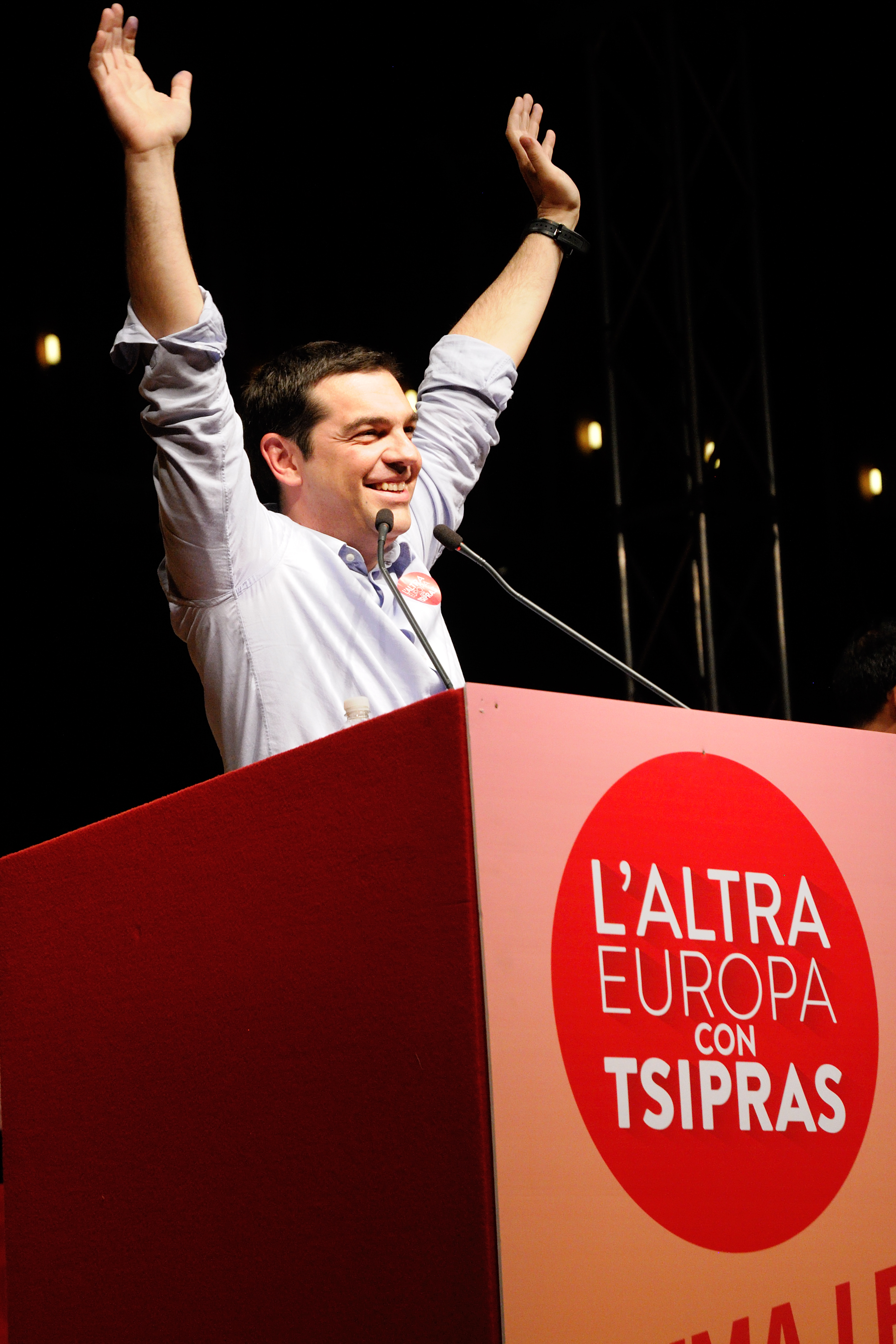
Tsipras in Bologna giving a speech for The Other Europe (L'Altra Europa) Alliance in 2014

After the departure of the Communist Party of Greece from Synaspismos in 1991, Tsipras remained in the coalition. In May 1999 he became the first political secretary of Synaspismos' youth-wing, the Synaspismos Youth. During this period he was described as a centrist, different from the very clear radical, left-wing profile he would later maintain as leader of Synaspismos. He won many awards during this time. In November 2003, he was succeeded by Tasos Koronakis and moved on to the mother party. He managed quite efficiently to maintain a strong adherence to the policy of the party, effectively out talking both the left and right political wings. As secretary of Synaspismos Youth, he took an active part in the process of creating the Greek Social Forum and attended many of the international protests and marches against neoliberal globalization. In December 2004, at the 4th Congress of Synaspismos, he was elected a member of the party's Central Political Committee and consequently to the Political Secretariat, where he was responsible for educational and youth issues.

Tsipras first entered the limelight of mainstream Greek politics during the 2006 local election when he ran for Mayor of Athens under the "Anoikhti Poli" (Greek: Ανοιχτή Πόλη, "Open City") Syriza ticket that gained 10.51% of the Athenian vote, finishing third overall. Tsipras won a seat on the Municipality of Athens council by virtue of him being first on the Syriza list. He did not run for the Greek Parliament in the 2007 election, choosing to continue the completion his term as a member of the municipal council of Athens.

Tsipras was elected Leader of Synaspismos during its 5th Congress on 10 February 2008, after its previous Leader Alekos Alavanos decided not to stand for election again for personal reasons. Tsipras became leader of Synaspismos at the age of 33, thus becoming the youngest leader of a Greek political party since 1931. In the 2009 election, he was elected to the Hellenic Parliament for Athens A and was subsequently voted unanimously to be the head of the Syriza parliamentary group. Tsipras led SYRIZA through the 2012 elections, overseeing a swing of over 22% to the party and becoming the Leader of the Opposition and head of the Shadow Cabinet of Alexis Tsipras.

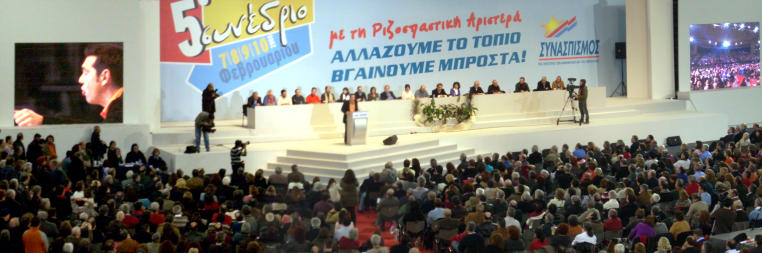
Alexis Tsipras giving his speech as a presidential candidate at the 5th Congress of Synaspismos.

In March 2013 Tsipras visited Karamanlis Foundation (Karamanlis was the founder of Nea Dimokratia)

In December 2013, Tsipras was the first candidate proposed for the position of president of the Commission of the European Union by the European United Left–Nordic Green Left (GUE/NGL). The vote was an EU member states election to the European Parliament in May 2014.

Tsipras campaigned as the only candidate of the south periphery countries. At the beginning of May 2014, in a speech in Berlin, he clarified many of his positions, in opposition to the allegedly Merkel-dominated neoliberal political course in Europe. Tsipras declared a substantial change for a better future for all Europeans is visible within 10 years. He addressed those who lost out in the fallout of the financial crises from 2008 to 2014, which produced unexpectedly high unemployment rates in most of the EU. The speech was given in English to a German audience and intended to be listened to throughout Europe. Although the GUE/NGL won in Greece, winning six of the 21 Greek seats in the European Parliament, it finished fifth in Europe overall.

== Prime minister (2015–2019) ==
=== First term (January–August 2015) ===
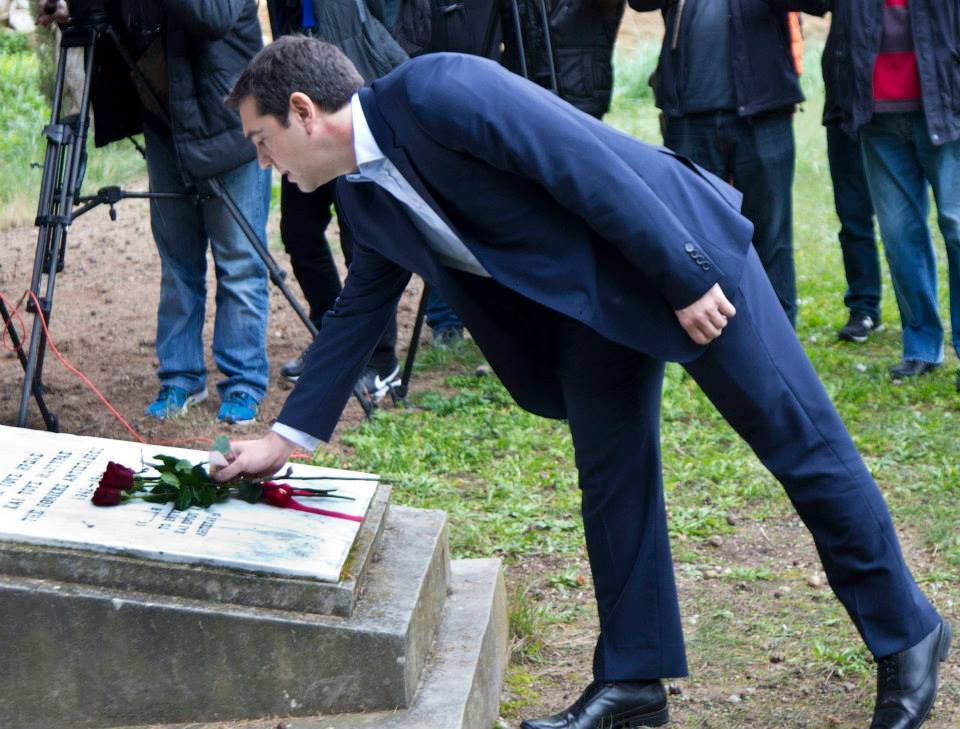
Alexis Tsipras laying down red roses at the Kaisariani Memorial.

Tsipras led Syriza to victory in the general election held on 25 January 2015, falling short of an outright majority in Parliament by just two seats. The following morning, Tsipras reached an agreement with the right-wing populist Independent Greeks party to form a coalition.

On the same day he was sworn in by President Karolos Papoulias as the youngest prime minister in Greek history, using the words "I declare in my name, honour and conscience to uphold the Constitution and its laws." Tsipras was also the first prime minister to take a civil oath rather than a religious oath of office, marking a rupture with Greek orthodox ceremonial culture. While reaffirming the good relations between his party and the Church, he generated further religious controversy during a meeting with Archbishop Ieronymos. Tsipras explained that as an atheist who neither married in a religious ceremony nor baptised his children, he would not take a religious oath of office.

In his first act after being sworn in, Tsipras visited the Resistance Memorial in Kaisariani, laying down red roses to commemorate the 200 members of the Greek Resistance executed by the German Wehrmacht on 1 May 1944.

During the first meeting of the new cabinet, Tsipras declared the priorities of his government to be the fight against the "humanitarian crisis" in Greece, negotiations with the EU and the International Monetary Fund on restructuring the Greek debt, and the implementation of promises made by SYRIZA such as the abolition of the previous government's privatization policies.

On 3 February, Tsipras made his first official state visit, meeting with his Italian counterpart Matteo Renzi in Rome. They held a joint press conference expressing concerns about austerity measures imposed by the Juncker Commission and stated that economic growth is the only way to exit from the crisis. After the press conference, Renzi presented Tsipras with an Italian tie as a gift. Tsipras, who is notable for never wearing ties, thanked Renzi and said that he would wear the gift in celebration when Greece had successfully renegotiated the austerity measures.

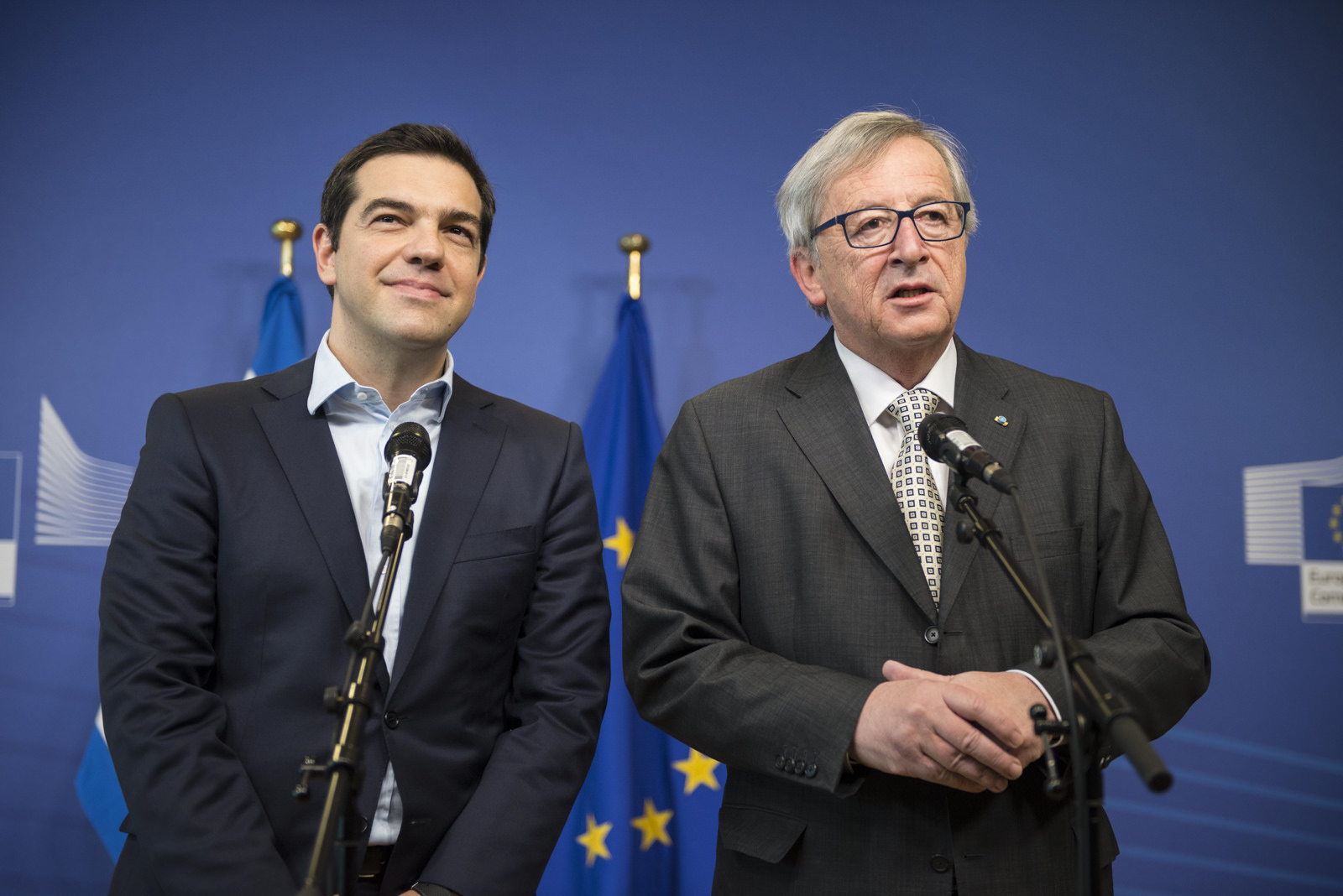
Tsipras and President of the European Commission Jean-Claude Juncker, 13 March 2015

On 20 February, the Eurogroup came to an agreement with Greece to extend the Greek bailout for four months. Tsipras had also announced a trip to Moscow on 8 April, in a bid to secure Russian support.

On 31 May, Tsipras laid out his complaints and outlined his plan in a recap of events since his election. He concluded that there were at least two competing visions for the integration of Europe, both of which he seemed to reject, and that certain unnamed institutional actors had "an obsession" with their own technocratic programme.

On 22 June, Tsipras presented a new Greek proposal, which included raising the retirement age gradually to 67 and curbing early retirement. It also offered to reform the value-added-tax system to set the main rate at 23 percent. On 29 June Greek banks stayed shut and Tsipras said they would remain so to impose capital control. Trading in Greek stocks and bonds halted as well.

==== Bailout referendum ====
On 27 June 2015, Tsipras announced a referendum to decide whether or not Greece should accept the bailout conditions proposed jointly by the Juncker Commission, the International Monetary Fund and the European Central Bank.

Tsipras recommended a "No" vote. On 3 July, during an address to at least 250,000 people gathered in the capital's Syntagma Square in front of parliament, he rejected some leaders' warnings that a "No" result in Sunday's plebiscite could see Greece forced to leave the eurozone. He declared "On Sunday, we are not simply deciding to remain in Europe—we are deciding to live with dignity in Europe". The result of the referendum was 61.3% voting "No."

==== Bailout agreement ====
After several days of negotiation, on 13 July 2015, Tsipras came to an agreement with lenders. Greece was to get a loan of 82 to 86 billion euros, which would be handed to Greece gradually from 2015 until June 2018. In return, Greece would have to increase the VAT, reform the pension system, assure the independence of ELSTAT, automatically cut public spending to get primary surpluses, reform justice so decisions can be made faster, follow the reforms proposed by OECD, revoke the laws passed by Tsipras except for the one concerning the "humanitarian crisis", recapitalize the banks, privatize 50 billion of state assets, and decrease the cost of the public sector. In return, Greece would be given the Juncker package, 35 billion euros, which is meant to help the Greek economy grow. The Syriza-led government of Greece accepted a bailout package that contains larger pension cuts and tax increases than the one rejected by Greek voters in the referendum.

On 14 August, the Greek parliament backed the country's new bailout deal, although more than 40 MPs from Syriza voted against the deal and Tsipras had to rely on the support of the pro-EU opposition: New Democracy, To Potami and PASOK. Tsipras told MPs they were facing a choice between "staying alive or suicide". He also said: "I have my conscience clear that it is the best we could achieve under the current balance of power in Europe, under conditions of economic and financial asphyxiation imposed upon us."

==== Resignation ====
On 20 August 2015, Tsipras resigned from his position as Prime Minister of Greece due to the rebellion of MPs from his own party and called for a snap election. He made the announcement in a televised state address. After opposition parties failed to form a government, Vassiliki Thanou-Christophilou was appointed as an interim prime minister until elections could be held.

=== Second term (September 2015 – July 2019) ===
==== Re-election ====
Despite a low turnout of only 57% versus 64% in previous elections, at the 20 September election, Tsipras received a solid vote of confidence, with Syriza achieving 35.50% of the vote, enough to form a coalition with ANEL. Among others, Tsipras appointed in his new government Dimitris Kammenos, a politician from ANEL, as deputy minister for infrastructure, transport and networks, causing reactions because of Kammenos's anti-Semitic, racist and homophobic comments on Twitter, such as accusations of 9/11 being a 'Jewish' plot. The outcry against him eventually forced Kammenos to resign, being a minister for less than 12 hours.

==== Second cabinet ====
In October 2015, Tsipras sacked Greece's top tax collection official, Katerina Savvaidou, because she had allegedly granted an extension to television stations to pay a 20% tax on advertising. The government's fiscal measures prompted some backlash, with farmers threatening to bring their tractors into Athens and pharmacists going on strike. In November 2015, Tsipras received an angry reception at a refugee camp in Lesbos by around a hundred protesters, wearing life jackets and brandishing placards calling on the European Union to stop deaths by allowing asylum seekers safe and legal passage to Europe.

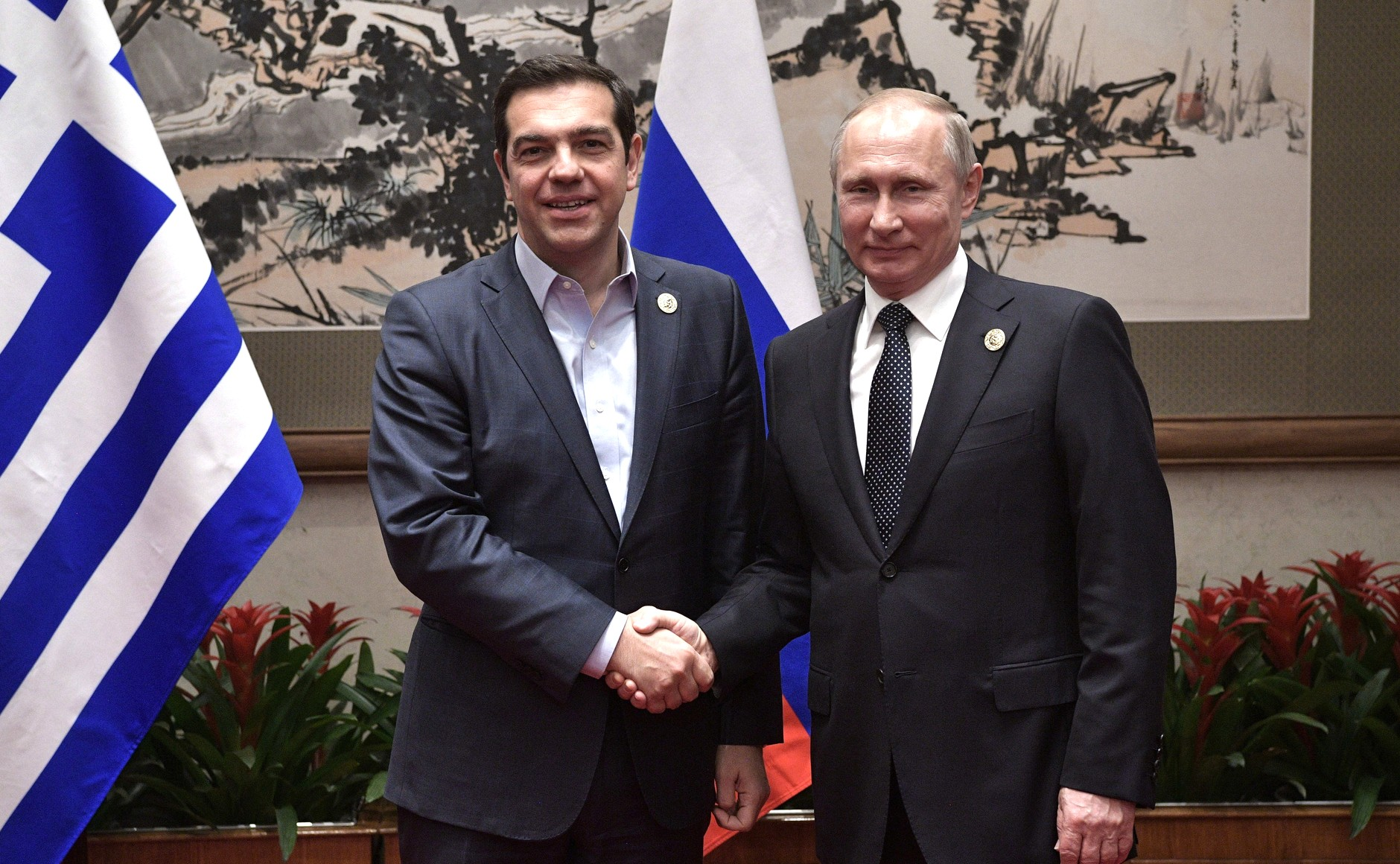
Tsipras and Russian president Vladimir Putin, 15 May 2017

In November 2015, Tsipras became the first Greek prime minister to visit Turkey's Aegean province of İzmir since the days of the Occupation of Smyrna, meeting Prime Minister Ahmet Davutoğlu; they agreed to cooperate on the refugee crisis and to establish technical cooperation between Greek and Turkish coast guards.

In December 2015, he introduced the cohabitation agreement for same sex-couples. The bill was approved by the Greek Parliament on 23 December 2015. in May 2018, a law allows adoption for same-sex couples.

On 19 March 2016, Tsipras spoke at a conference of the "Alliance Against Austerity for Democracy in Europe" held in Athens. In his speech, he expressed concern over the possibility of Donald Trump becoming US president. He said as follows: "Tell me who of you would believe a few months ago that in the US today, the front-runner on behalf of the Republicans for the nomination of the candidate President would be Mr. Trump? And of course, what this nomination marks, the ideas it represents, the appeal it reaches, and the threat to become even President – I hope we will not face this evil."

In May 2016, new austerity measures proposed by Tsipras passed Parliament. The legislation increased taxes to middle- and high-level income earners; make across-the-board budget cuts amounting to about 3% of Greece's GDP; removed value-added-tax discounts; cut pensions; and increase deregulation. Tsipras called for calm on the streets and defended the austerity package, saying it fell in line with the agreement reached with the EU the previous year. Further austerity legislation included a provision for "contingency" measures, including wage and pension cuts, that would take effect automatically if budget targets were derailed next year. Taxes on cigarettes, coffee and craft beer were also raised, while an unpopular property tax was restructured to increase revenues from larger buildings. A new privatisation agency was set up which would have a 99-year remit to develop and sell state-owned property. Tsipras defended his adoption of new fiscal measures, telling Parliament: "Spring may be almost over but we are looking forward to an economic spring and a return to growth this year." In December 2016, a social reform aimed at the poorest pensioners caused the suspension of Greek debt relief measures by the European Union.

The economic policy of his government, often described as aligned with the directives of the European Commission, earned him strong opposition from the left. Some Syriza MPs split from the party and formed the Popular Unity. On the other hand, those close to the government believe that it had to face "the obstruction of state institutions and the oligarchy" and that "a left-wing government cannot succeed alone, especially if its country is small and on the verge of bankruptcy". For their part, senior European officials acknowledge that "this government will, more than any other, be scrutinized when it regains its autonomy."

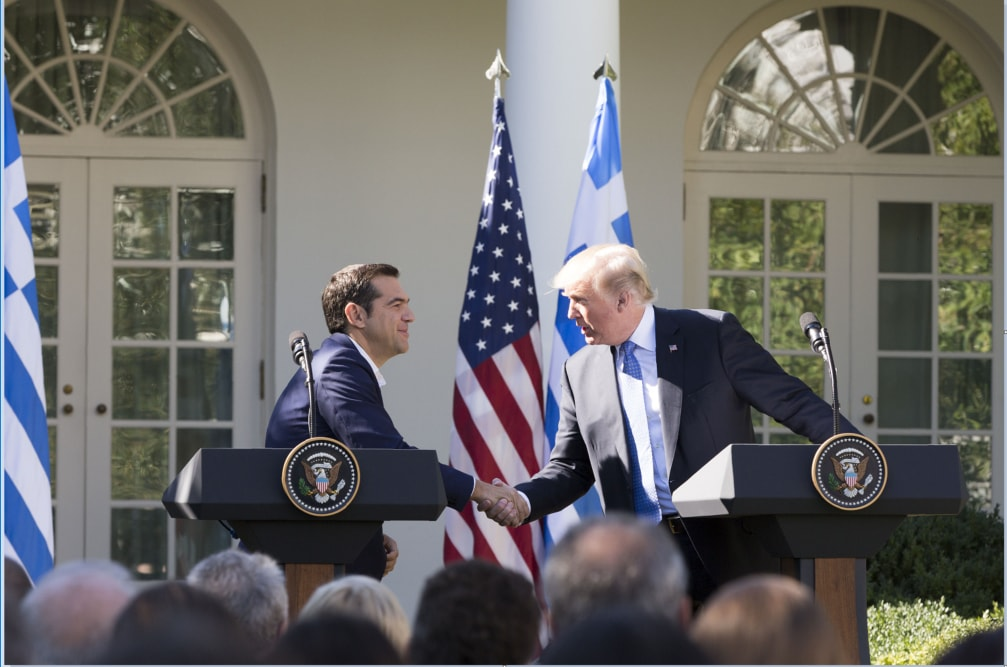
Tsipras and U.S. President Donald Trump, 18 October 2017

In July 2017, Tsipras opined that the Greek economy was "on the up" and that "the worst is clearly behind us." He also expressed confidence that Greece would no longer have to rely on bailouts and international oversight in 2018. According to media reports from mid-July, Greece was considering rejoining the bond market for the first time since 2014 to borrow from the capital market. It was speculated that the government could issue a five-year bond at a time when yields on Greek bonds were their lowest since the country left the market in 2014. The announcement came a few days after the IMF "in principle" approved Greece for a conditional loan of up to $1.8 billion. The IMF made the payment of the loans contingent on Greece's debt sustainability, demanding that euro-zone countries provide debt relief to the country.

In October 2017 Tsipras met with President Donald Trump at the White House in Washington, D.C., where Trump told Tsipras that he supported a "responsible debt relief" plan for Greece. Trump added that his administration had informed Congress of a potential sale to upgrade the F-16 aircraft in Greece's air force, a deal that could be worth $2.4 billion.

Greece officially concluded its three-year European Stability Mechanism (ESM) financial assistance programme on 20 August 2018, following the disbursement of €61.9 billion by the ESM over three years to support the country's macroeconomic adjustment and bank recapitalization. ESM Members agreed on the financial assistance package in August 2015. "The conclusion of the ESM programme marks a very important moment and historic for all of us. We had eight very difficult years, often painful years, but now Greece can finally turn a page in a crisis that has lasted too long," according to EU Commissioner for Economic and Financial Affairs Pierre Moscovici. A day after Moscovici's statement, Prime Minister Alexis Tsipras said during a state address from the island of Ithaca: "A new day is dawning in our country, today is the beginning of a new era". Tsipras furthermore asserted that the country had regained its sovereignty to determine its own future, reaching a destination that would allow the Greeks "to make our place as it deserves to be."

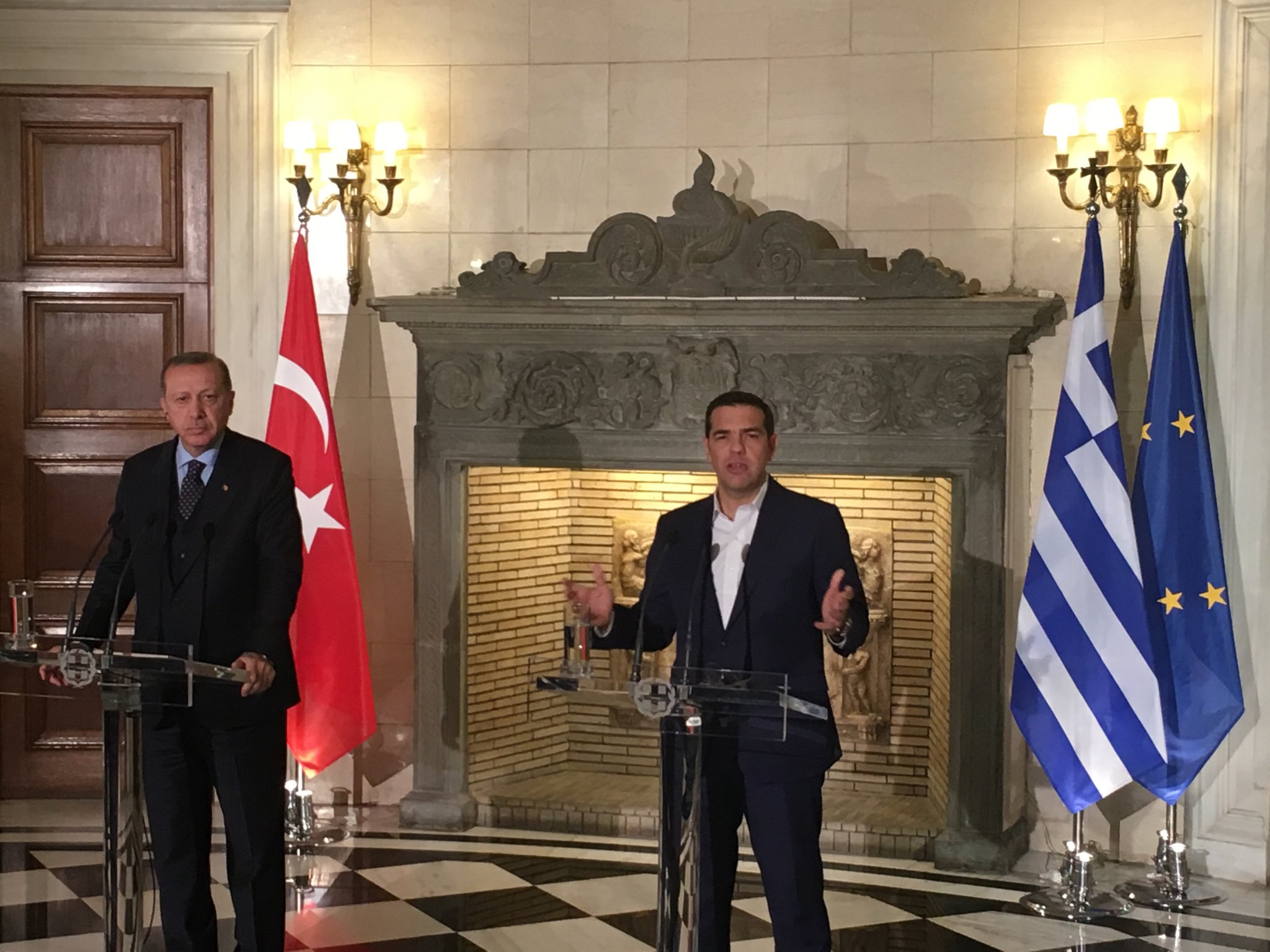
Tsipras with Turkish president Recep Tayyip Erdoğan on 7 December 2017

In January 2019, Greece Defence Minister Panos Kammenos and his Independent Greeks party quit Greece's ruling coalition over a deal struck on the Macedonia naming dispute, potentially leaving the governing coalition without a workable majority in parliament. Despite this, some days later, Tsipras managed to win a confidence vote. The confidence vote was followed by the ratification of the Prespa Agreement, which resolved a long-standing dispute and named Greece's northern neighbour as North Macedonia.

Along with the austerity measures, Tsipras had promised a "parallel programme" with social reforms in order to achieve a balance between the agreement with Europe and the fight against poverty and neo-liberalism. Some of the main reforms were an increase in the minimum wage, introduction of a minimum income scheme, and increase of the budget for healthcare and education etc.

Syriza suffered a harsh defeat in the European election on 26 May 2019, losing to the opposition party New Democracy. Following the defeat, snap elections were called.

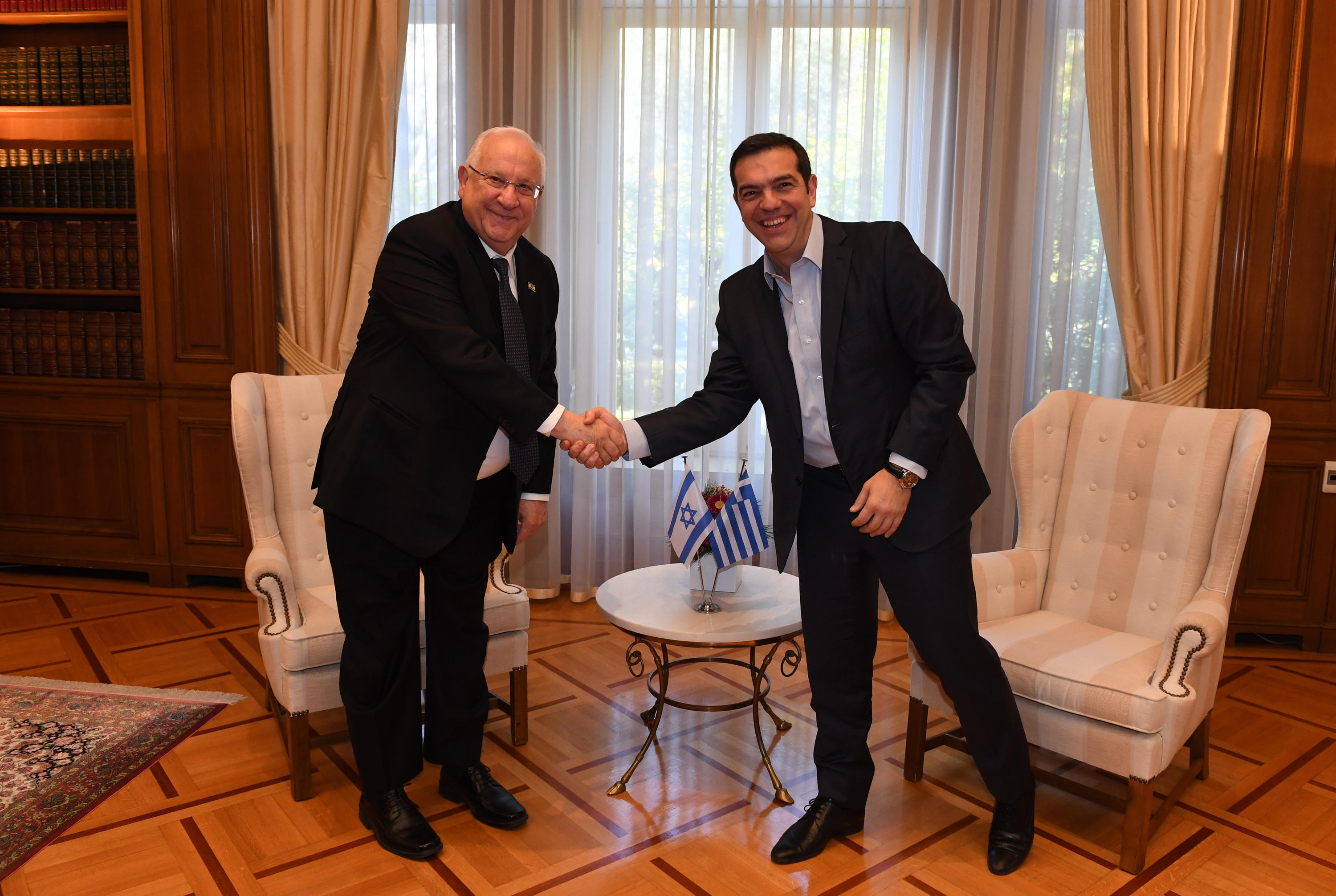
Tsipras and Israeli President Reuven Rivlin, 29 January 2018

Syriza was defeated in the 2019 legislative election, scoring 31.53% of votes and securing 86 seats in parliament. The party once again suffered defeat in the 2023 elections, both in May and June, in which their share of the vote collapsed drastically, ending up losing over one-third of the seats they had won four years prior. Tsipras conceded defeat and resigned four days after June elections, on 29 June.

His first non-official biography has been written by Fabien Perrier and by Topos in Greece.

==== Macedonian naming dispute ====
During the last years in Opposition and also in his inauguration speech, the new prime minister Zoran Zaev vowed his determination to resolve the decades-old dispute with Greece. Efforts between the governments of the two countries for resolving the name dispute intensified, and on 17 January 2018, UN-sponsored negotiations had resumed, with the Greek and Macedonian ambassadors Adamantios Vassilakis and Vasko Naumovski meeting with the UN Envoy at Washington, who suggested five names in his proposal, all containing the name "Macedonia" transliterated from Cyrillic.

After the Zaev-Tsipras meeting in Davos, Zaev announced that streets and locations such as the Alexander the Great airport in Skopje which were named by the nationalist VMRO-DPMNE after ancient Macedonian heroes and figures such as Alexander the Great, could be renamed as a sign of goodwill towards Greece. Specifically, Zaev declared that the Alexander the Great Highway, the E-75 motorway that connects Skopje to Greece, could be renamed to "Friendship Highway". In exchange, the Greek PM announced that Greece could consent to Macedonia's bid to the Adriatic-Ionian Cooperation Agreement and the Greek Parliament could ratify the second phase of the European Union Association Agreement with Macedonia as part of the accession of North Macedonia to the European Union which was blocked in 2009 by Greece owing to the name dispute.

In late February 2018, the government and institutions of the Republic of Macedonia announced the halt of the Skopje 2014 program, which aimed to make Macedonia's capital have a "more classical appeal" and begun removing its controversial monuments and statues.

In Spring 2018, extensive negotiations in a bid to resolve the naming dispute were held in rounds, with frequent meetings of the Foreign Ministers of Greece and Macedonia achieving tangible progress on the naming dispute.

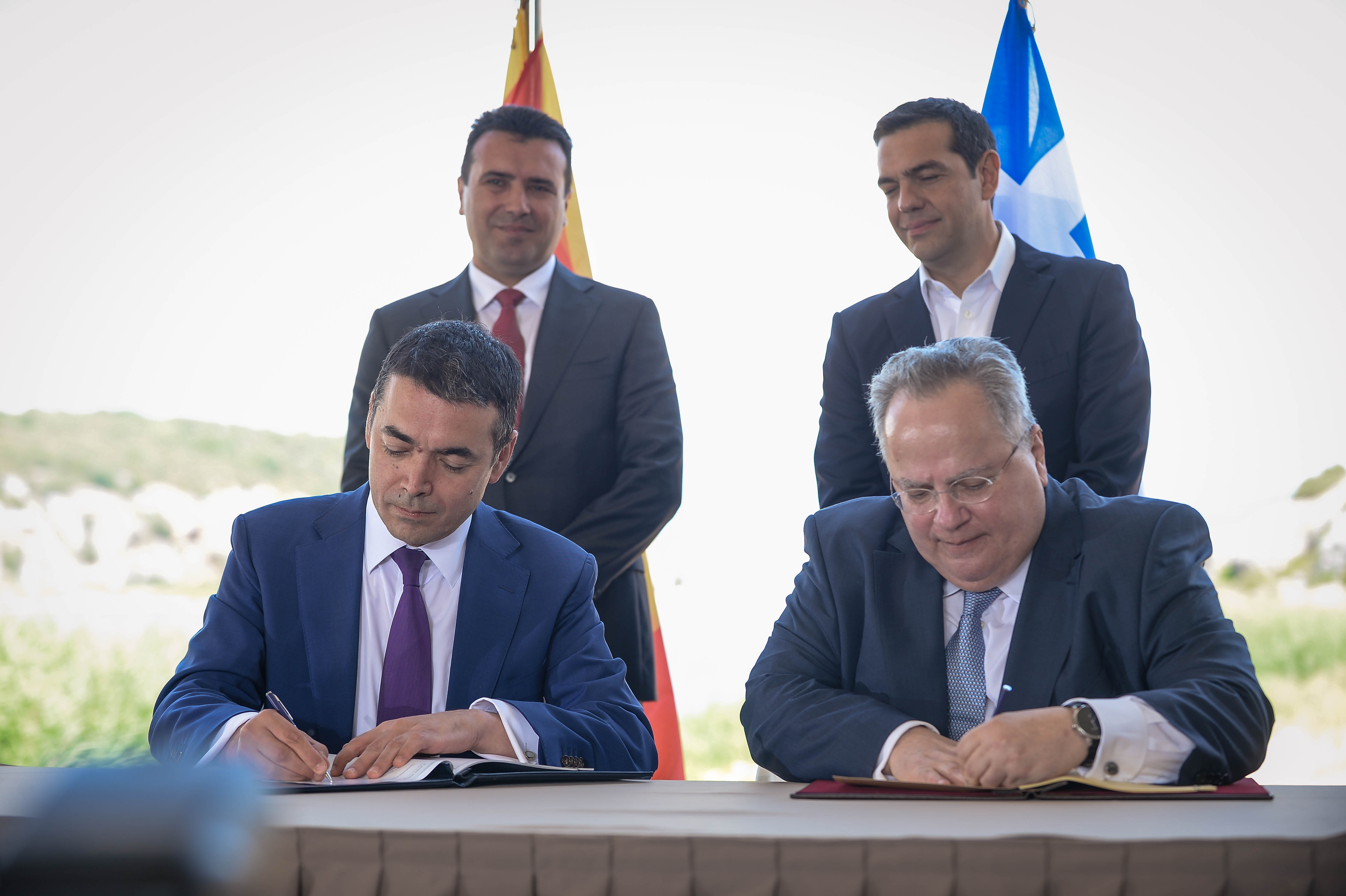
Zaev stands with Greek PM Alexis Tsipras as the foreign ministers of both countries sign the Prespa Agreement

On 12 June 2018, Tsipras announced that an agreement had been reached with his Macedonian counterpart Zoran Zaev on the dispute, "which covers all the preconditions set by the Greek side". The proposal would result in the (former) Republic of Macedonia being renamed the Republic of North Macedonia (Macedonian: Република Северна Македонија, romanized: Republika Severna Makedonija; Greek: Δημοκρατία της Βόρειας Μακεδονίας), with the new name being used for all purposes. Zaev announced that the deal includes recognition of Macedonian in the United Nations and that the citizens of the country will be called, as before, Macedonians. However, there is an explicit clarification that the citizens of the country are not related to any Hellenic civilization previously inhabiting the region.

On 5 July, the Prespa agreement was ratified again by the parliament of Macedonia with 69 MPs voting in favor of it. On 11 July, NATO invited Macedonia to start accession talks in a bid to become the alliance's 30th member. On 30 July, the parliament of Macedonia approved plans to hold a non-binding referendum on changing the country's name that took place on 30 September. The vote to amend the constitution and change the name of the country passed on 11 January 2019. The amendment entered into force following the ratification of the Prespa agreement and the Protocol of Accession of North Macedonia to NATO by the Greek Parliament.

== Personal life ==
Tsipras is not married. His registered partner is Peristera "Betty" Baziana, an electrical and computer engineer. They met in 1987, at the age of 13, at Ampelokipoi Branch High School. Both eventually became members of the Communist Youth of Greece. They live together in Athens with their two sons. Their younger son's middle name is Ernesto, a tribute to the Marxist revolutionary Ernesto "Che" Guevara. Tsipras has claimed to be a football fan and a supporter of Panathinaikos. Tsipras is an atheist. His cousin, Giorgos Tsipras, is a Syriza MP.

== See also ==
- Politics of Greece
- List of international prime ministerial trips made by Alexis Tsipras

Party political offices
Preceded by Party established	Leader of ELAS; 2026–present	Succeeded by
Preceded by Alekos Alavanos	Leader of Syriza; 2009–2023	Succeeded by Stefanos Kasselakis
Political offices
Preceded by Antonis Samaras	Leader of the Opposition; 2012–2015	Succeeded by Antonis Samaras
Preceded by Antonis Samaras	Prime Minister of Greece; 2015	Succeeded by Vassiliki Thanou-Christophilou
Preceded by Vassiliki Thanou-Christophilou	Prime Minister of Greece; 2015–2019	Succeeded by Kyriakos Mitsotakis
Preceded by Nikos Kotzias	Minister for Foreign Affairs; Acting; 2018–2019	Succeeded by Georgios Katrougalos
Preceded by Kyriakos Mitsotakis	Leader of the Opposition; 2019–2023	Succeeded by Sokratis Famellos
Order of precedence
Preceded by Antonis Samaras as former Prime Minister	Order of precedence of Greece; Former Prime Minister	Succeeded by Vassiliki Thanou-Christophilou as former Prime Minister
