= 2014 European Parliament election in Greece =

- 25 May 2014

All 21 Greek seats in the European Parliament
- Turnout: 59.33%
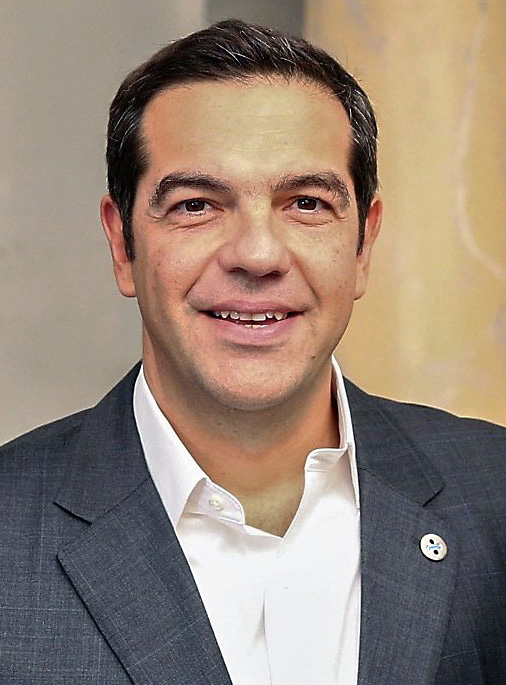

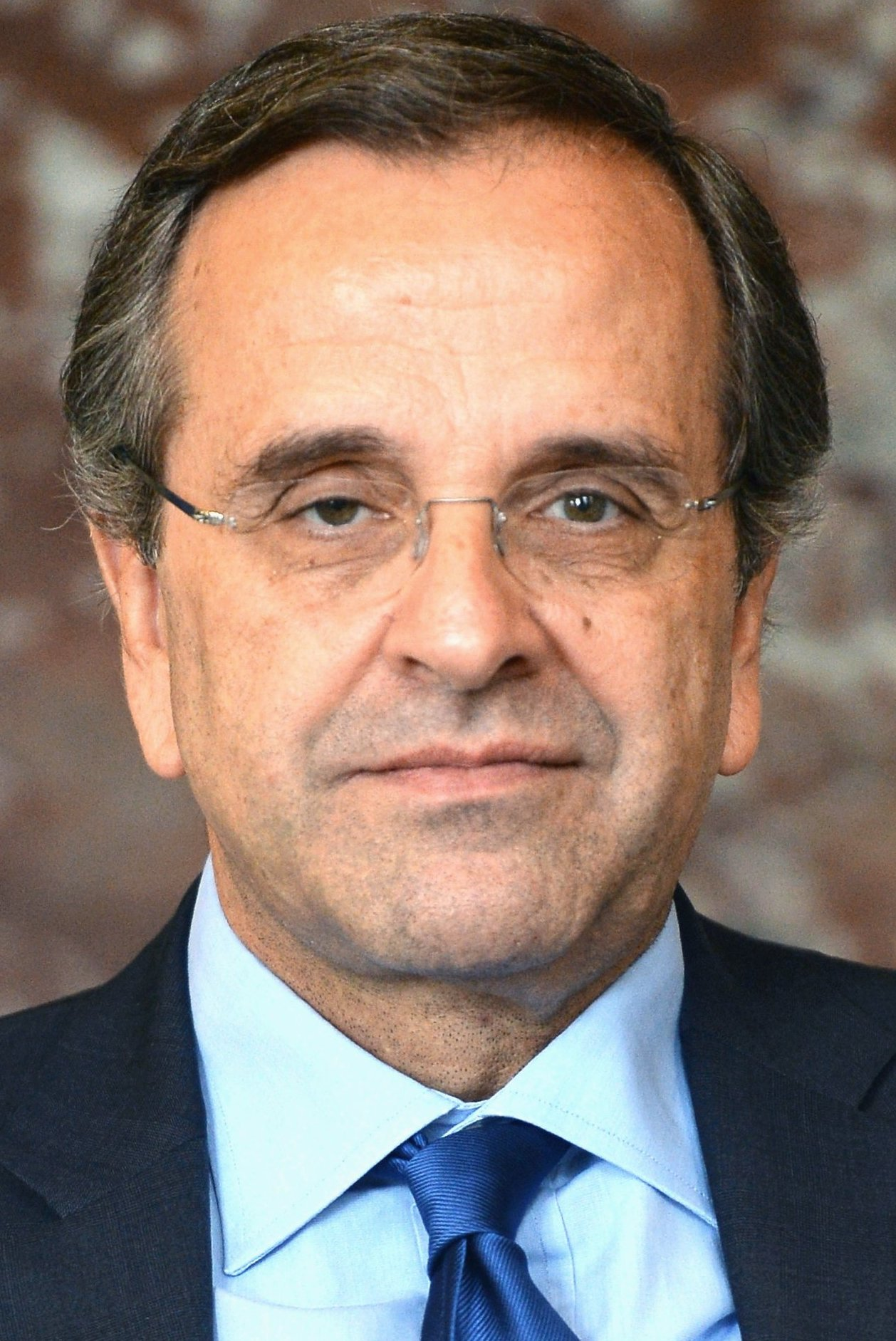

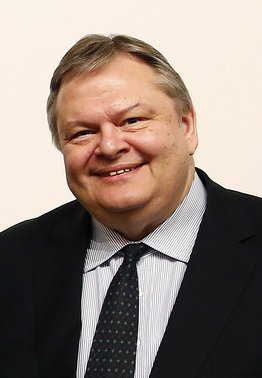

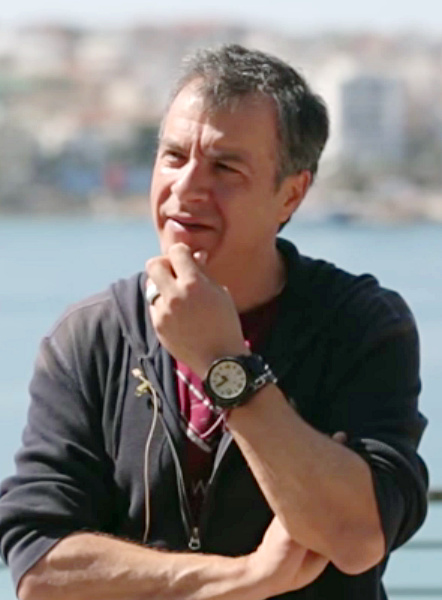

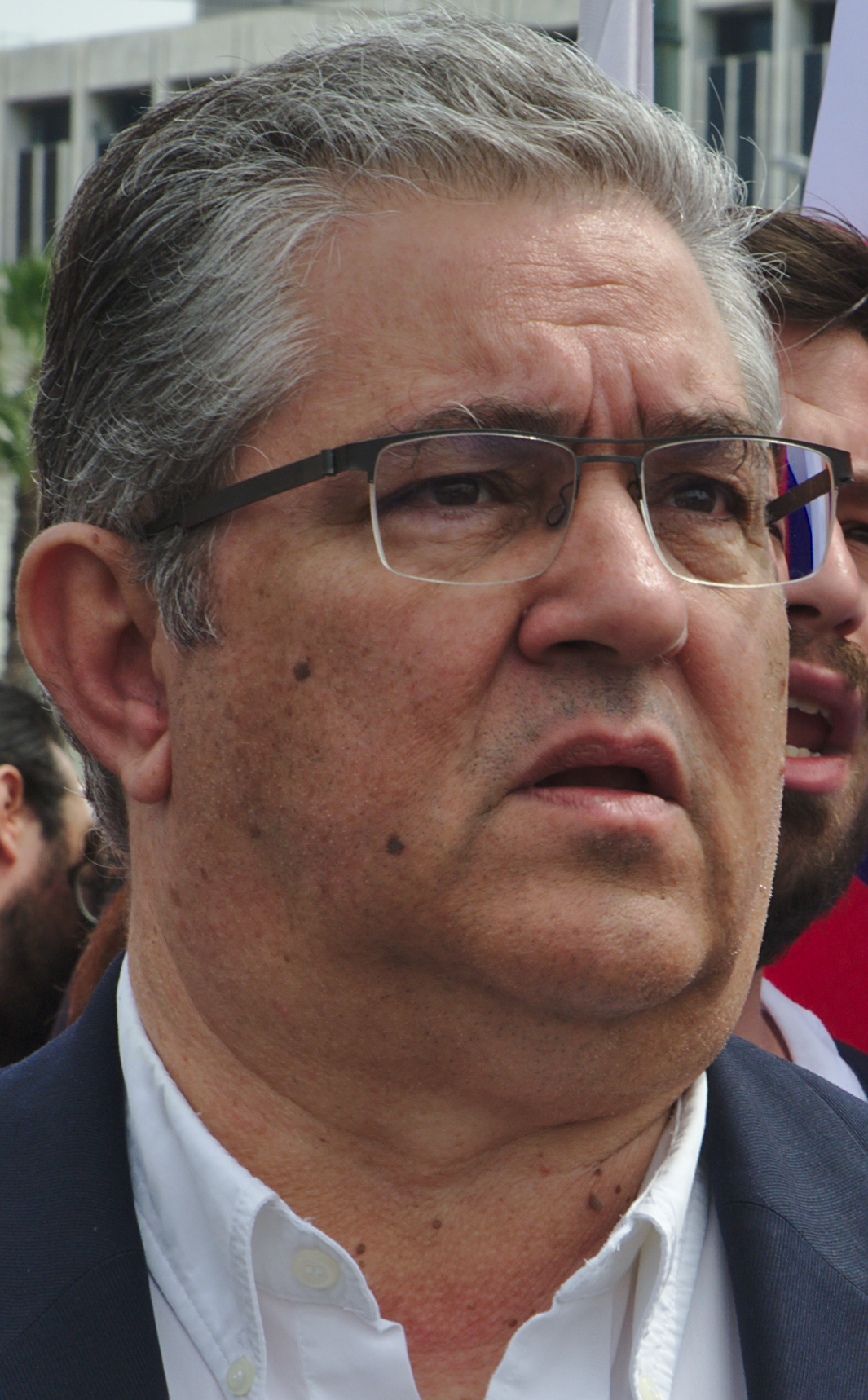

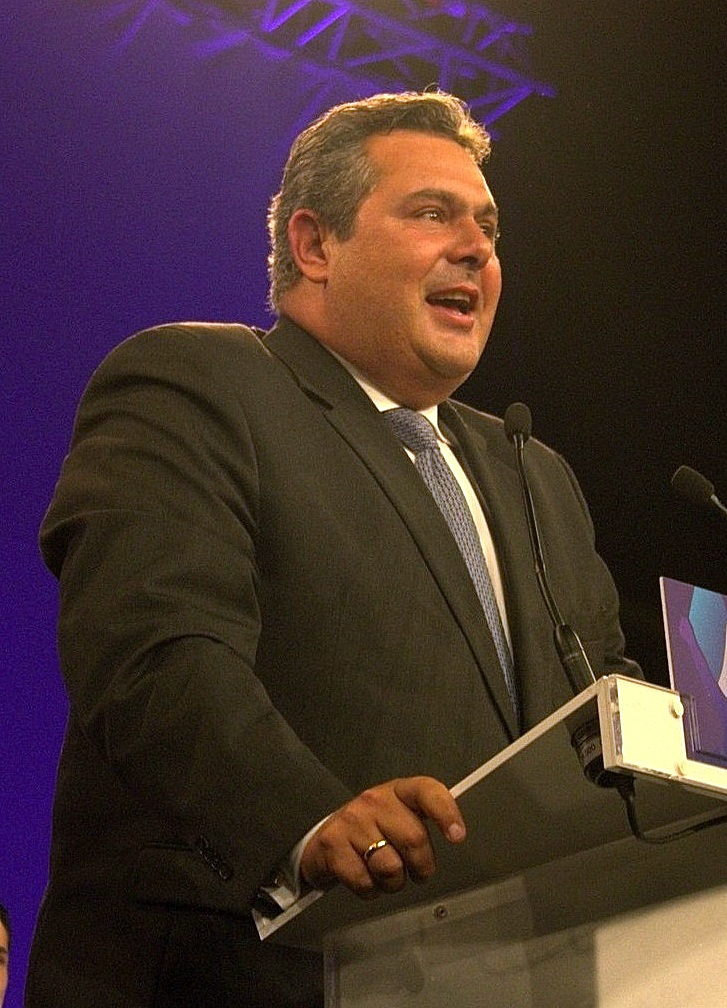
	First party	Second party	Third party
Leader	Alexis Tsipras	Antonis Samaras	Nikolaos Michaloliakos
Party	Syriza	ND	ΧΑ
Alliance	GUE/NGL	EPP	NI
Last election	4.70%, 1 seat	32.30%, 8 seats	0.46%, 0 seats
Seats won	6	5	3
Seat change	▲5	▼3	▲3
Popular vote	1,518,376	1,298,948	536,913
Percentage	26.56%	22.72%	9.39%
Swing	▲21.86pp	▼9.58pp	▲8.93pp
	Fourth party	Fifth party	Sixth party
Leader	Evangelos Venizelos	Stavros Theodorakis	Dimitris Koutsoumpas
Party	ELIA	To Potami	KKE
Alliance	S&D	S&D	NI
Last election	36.65%, 8 seats	–	8.35%, 2 seats
Seats won	2	2	2
Seat change	▼6	New	Steady
Popular vote	458,514	377,662	349,342
Percentage	8.02%	6.61%	6.11%
Swing	▼28.63pp	New	▼2.24pp
	Seventh party
Leader	Panos Kammenos
Party	ANEL
Alliance	ECR
Last election	–
Seats won	1
Seat change	New
Popular vote	197,837
Percentage	3.46%
Swing	New

European Parliament elections were held in Greece on 25 May 2014 to elect the 21 Greek members of the European Parliament. The number of seats allocated to Greece declined from 22 to 21, as a result of the 2013 reapportionment of seats in the European Parliament.

The election marked a significant milestone as the left-wing SYRIZA party emerged as the largest party for the first time, securing 26.6% of the votes. This achievement signaled a major shift in Greek politics.

While the conservative New Democracy party remained the second-largest party with 22.7% of the votes, it experienced substantial losses compared to the previous election. The far-right Golden Dawn party made significant gains, becoming the third-largest party and achieving its strongest electoral performance to date, receiving 9.4% of the votes.

On the other hand, the center-left PASOK party suffered a severe decline, witnessing a dramatic decrease in support from 37% in 2009 to only 8% of the votes in this election. This outcome demonstrated a substantial collapse of PASOK's political influence.

In addition to the established parties, two new political entities, To Potami and ANEL, managed to secure enough votes to gain representation in the European Parliament. Meanwhile, the Communist Party maintained its stable position.

According to Jim Yardley of The New York Times, "the vote has become a de facto referendum on the governing coalition and a test of whether ordinary citizens believe the government's assertion that the country is finally on the upswing."

== Participating parties ==
46 parties and coalitions are participating in the elections:

- Union of Centrists
- Front of the Greek Anticapitalist Left
- OKDE
- ASKE
- National Unity
- Koinonia
- KEAN
- Part of Equality, Peace and Friendship
- Popular Orthodox Rally
- Party of Greek Hunters
- National Dawn
- Communist Party of Greece
- The River (Greek: Το Ποτάμι, To Potami)
- PAEKE
- Bridges : (incl. Drassi, Recreate Greece)
- Golden Dawn
- EEK
- Lefko
- Greek Ecologists
- E.PA.M
- OAKKE
- Freedom
- Democratic Left
- National Front
- Olive Tree: (incl. PASOK, Agreement for the New Greece, Dynamic Greece, New Reformers)
- Greens
- People's Resistance
- New Democracy
- Kollatos
- Elpida Politias
- Youth Party
- Panathinaiko Kinima
- Drachmi Greek Democratic Movement Five Stars
- Ecologist Greens-Pirate Party of Greece
- National Hope
- Rainbow
- EL.LA.DA.
- Plan B
- Socialist Party
- Greek European Citizens
- New Greece
- Coalition of the Radical Left
- Kinonia Axion
- AKKEL
- Patriotic Unity
- Independent Greeks – Panhellenic Citizen Chariot

== Opinion polling ==
Poll results are listed in the table below in reverse chronological order, showing the most recent first. The highest percentage figure in each polling survey is displayed in bold, and the background shaded in the leading party's colour. In the instance that there is a tie, then no figure is shaded. The lead column on the right shows the percentage-point difference between the two parties with the highest figures. Poll results use the date the survey's fieldwork was done, as opposed to the date of publication. However, if such date is unknown, the date of publication will be given instead.

Date	Polling Firm	Elia	ND	KKE	SYRIZA	XA	DIMAR	ANEL	Potami	Others	Lead
**25 May 2014**	**Election Results**	**8.0**	**22.7**	**6.1**	**26.6**	**9.4**	**1.2**	**3.5**	**6.6**	**15.9**	**3.9**
24 May	MRB (Note: This survey shows its poll results without disregarding those who are undecided or said they will abstain from voting (either physically or by voting blank). To obtain results comparable to other surveys and the official election results, the result shown in this table will be that obtained, with a simple rule of three, from disregarding undecided and/or abstaining voters from the totals offered in the survey.)	7.0	25.6	5.9	**29.0**	9.2	2.6	3.6	8.1	9.1	3.4
20–23 May	GPO	7.9	25.0	6.3	**26.1**	9.6	2.8	3.9	7.9	10.5	1.1
22 May	Metron Analysis	8.2	26.5	4.0	**30.6**	8.5	2.5	3.5	8.6	7.6	4.1
20–22 May	Marc	6.4	24.1	6.3	**28.2**	10.0	2.7	4.6	6.9	10.9	4.1
20–22 May	Palmos Analysis	5.9	26.3	4.5	**30.8**	8.8	2.5	4.0	7.8	9.5	4.5
19–22 May	Alco	6.6	25.8	6.0	**30.0**	9.6	2.2	4.1	7.2	8.6	4.2
19–22 May	Public Issue	8.5	27.5	6.5	**30.0**	8.0	2.5	3.0	6.5	7.2	2.5
19–21 May	RASS	6.1	25.4	6.9	**28.5**	10.3	1.7	4.3	9.1	7.8	3.1
19–21 May	Pulse RC (Note: Pulse RC opinion polls round their data so that in the end up showing a .0 or a .5 value. This practise is maintained for these polls when disregarding undecided and/or abstaining voters from the totals so as to avoid different interpretations of the same value.)	7.5	24.5	6.5	**27.5**	9.5	2.5	4.5	7.5	9.0	3.0
18 May	Kapa Research	6.7	24.6	6.9	**29.7**	9.4	1.5	4.3	8.8	7.9	5.1
14–15 May	E-Voice	8.6	**27.1**	8.3	26.0	7.3	1.9	4.2	7.4	9.3	1.1
12–15 May	Palmos Analysis	6.8	25.6	5.9	**31.1**	7.1	3.5	4.7	7.4	7.8	5.5
14 May	E-Voice	8.5	**28.1**	7.7	26.6	8.0	1.8	4.2	6.9	8.2	1.5
10–14 May	Alco	6.1	26.4	6.0	**28.1**	8.8	2.9	5.5	8.6	7.6	1.7
9–14 May	Pulse RC	8.5	24.0	7.5	**26.5**	9.5	2.0	4.5	8.5	9.0	2.5
9–13 May	VPRC	5.0	24.0	7.0	**28.0**	8.0	3.0	5.0	8.0	12.0	4.0
8–12 May	GPO	7.0	24.6	8.2	**25.2**	8.8	3.5	4.3	10.0	8.3	0.6
7–9 May	Pulse RC	8.5	24.5	7.5	**26.0**	9.5	3.0	4.5	8.5	8.5	1.5
6–8 May	Kapa Research	6.3	24.9	7.4	**26.4**	8.7	2.4	4.7	10.3	8.8	1.5
5–8 May	E-Voice	8.4	**27.1**	7.2	25.4	7.7	2.6	4.3	9.3	8.3	1.7
2–7 May	Pulse RC	8.0	23.5	7.5	**25.5**	10.0	3.5	4.5	8.0	9.0	2.0
29 Apr–6 May	Public Issue	7.3	29.0	6.5	**29.8**	5.6	3.2	2.4	8.9	7.2	0.8
2 May	MRB	6.3	**27.0**	7.4	26.2	8.5	3.4	5.2	10.1	5.9	0.8
30 Apr–2 May	Pulse RC	7.5	23.5	7.0	**25.5**	11.5	3.5	4.5	8.0	8.5	2.0
24 Apr–1 May	Palmos Analysis	5.5	24.9	4.7	**29.6**	9.2	2.6	3.4	9.4	10.7	4.7
29–30 Apr	E-Voice	6.9	**27.1**	7.3	26.1	8.2	1.8	4.1	10.0	8.6	1.0
28–30 Apr	Metron Analysis	5.9	**28.4**	6.6	27.6	6.0	2.2	5.1	10.9	7.3	0.8
23–25 Apr	Alco	5.9	27.1	6.3	**27.8**	8.8	2.7	4.2	9.0	8.1	0.7
11–13 Apr	UoM	5.3	**24.3**	7.7	**24.3**	6.5	1.8	3.0	17.2	10.1	0.0
8–11 Apr	MRB	6.5	24.0	7.4	**24.3**	10.0	3.3	4.9	11.2	8.4	0.3
7–10 Apr	RASS	5.1	**27.5**	6.7	27.2	7.8	2.6	4.0	13.2	5.9	0.3
8–9 Apr	Pulse RC	8.5	21.5	7.5	**23.5**	11.5	2.5	5.0	11.5	8.0	2.0
1–8 Apr	Public Issue	8.7	26.0	7.1	**30.7**	6.3	3.9	3.9	7.9	5.5	4.7
3–5 Apr	GPO	6.7	24.0	8.2	**24.9**	8.6	3.4	5.0	10.8	8.2	0.9
3 Apr	Kapa Research	5.7	25.8	7.7	**26.7**	9.6	2.1	5.0	10.5	6.9	0.9
1–2 Apr	Kapa Research	6.7	**26.8**	7.2	24.2	8.5	2.6	4.8	11.3	7.9	2.6
1–2 Apr	VPRC	5.0	25.0	7.0	**27.5**	11.0	2.5	6.0	7.5	8.5	2.5
27–31 Mar	Marc	5.4	24.6	6.5	**27.3**	9.5	3.9	5.3	8.0	9.6	2.7
24–27 Mar	Alco	6.4	**25.1**	9.0	24.6	9.6	3.2	5.2	10.9	6.0	0.5
22–27 Mar	Palmos Analysis	5.6	22.6	7.5	**22.7**	10.0	2.8	4.7	14.5	9.6	0.1
17–18 Mar	Pulse RC	8.0	21.5	6.5	**24.0**	12.5	2.5	4.5	12.5	8.0	2.5
10–12 Mar	UoM	5.7	17.1	10.1	**23.4**	11.4	2.5	1.9	16.5	11.4	6.3
7–10 Mar	E-Voice	8.3	20.9	6.9	**22.3**	7.9	2.2	4.7	9.3	17.3	1.4
4–10 Mar	Public Issue	5.9	**26.3**	8.5	**26.3**	7.6	2.5	4.2	11.9	6.7	0.0
24 Feb – 1 Mar	Palmos Analysis	5.4	24.8	5.2	**30.7**	17.0	1.9	3.7	—N/a	11.4	5.9
24–26 Feb	Metron Analysis	6.9	27.7	8.2	**29.7**	9.6	4.6	5.7	—N/a	7.6	1.9
6–10 Feb	GPO	7.1	25.4	9.3	**27.8**	9.3	4.7	6.0	—N/a	10.4	2.4
5 Feb	Marc	5.7	24.9	7.3	**30.9**	12.4	4.3	4.4	—N/a	10.1	6.0
4–5 Feb	Metrisi	6.1	29.3	6.7	**30.4**	11.9	4.8	5.8	—N/a	5.1	1.1
2014
2–11 Dec	MRB	6.4	27.3	6.7	**28.9**	11.9	4.2	7.2	—N/a	7.3	1.6
28–30 Nov	GPO	7.2	25.6	7.7	**26.7**	10.7	4.8	7.2	—N/a	10.0	1.1
2013
**7 June 2009**	**Election Results**	**36.6**	**32.3**	**8.4**	**4.7**	**0.5**	**—N/a**	**—N/a**	**—N/a**	**17.5**	**4.3**

== Results ==
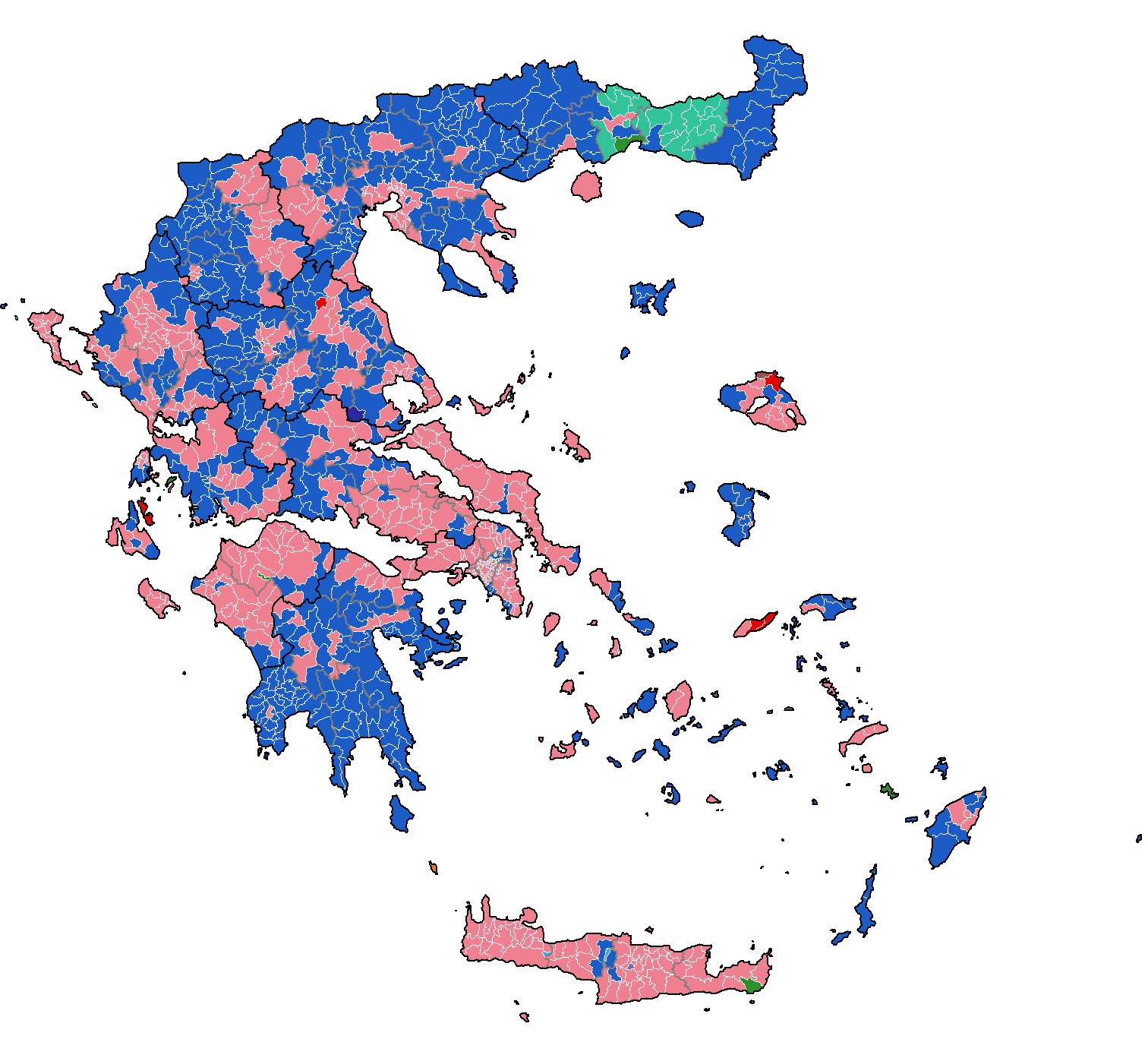
Results, showing the winning party in each municipal unit. SYRIZA (507) ND (483) KIEF (17) Elia (6) KKE (5) ANEL (2) Potami (1) EEP (1) AKKEL (1) Drachmi (1)

Party	Votes	%	Seats	+/–
Syriza	1,518,376	26.56	6	+5
New Democracy	1,298,948	22.72	5	−3
Popular Association - Golden Dawn	536,913	9.39	3	+3
Olive Tree	458,514	8.02	2	−6
The River	377,662	6.61	2	New
Communist Party of Greece	349,342	6.11	2	0
Independent Greeks	197,837	3.46	1	New
Popular Orthodox Rally	154,029	2.69	0	−2
Greek European Citizens	82,381	1.44	0	New
Democratic Left	68,630	1.20	0	New
Union for the Homeland and the People	59,482	1.04	0	New
Party of Greek Hunters	56,851	0.99	0	0
Bridges (Drassi−Recreate Greece)	51,738	0.91	0	New
Ecologist Greens–Pirate Party of Greece	51,703	0.90	0	−1
United Popular Front	49,334	0.86	0	New
Party of Friendship, Equality and Peace	42,792	0.75	0	New
Panathinaikos Movement	42,252	0.74	0	New
Antarsya	41,299	0.72	0	0
Union of Centrists	36,804	0.64	0	0
Society – Political Party of the Successors of Kapodistrias	34,487	0.60	0	New
Agricultural Livestock Party of Greece	32,356	0.57	0	New
Greens	28,365	0.50	0	New
Society of Values	20,856	0.36	0	New
National Unity Association	17,146	0.30	0	New
Plan B	11,307	0.20	0	New
Socialist Party	11,106	0.19	0	New
Marxist–Leninist Communist Party of Greece	10,771	0.19	0	0
Kollatos	8,978	0.16	0	New
Popular Unions of Bipartisan Social Groups	8,899	0.16	0	0
National Front	8,783	0.15	0	New
Drachmi	8,724	0.15	0	New
Hope for the State	6,801	0.12	0	New
Rainbow	5,737	0.10	0	0
Greek Ecologists	5,608	0.10	0	0
Patriotic Union − Greek Popular Rally	4,614	0.08	0	New
Workers Revolutionary Party	4,496	0.08	0	0
Fighting Socialist Party of Greece	3,627	0.06	0	0
Organisation of Internationalist Communists of Greece	3,045	0.05	0	New
Organization for the Reconstruction of the Communist Party of Greece	2,872	0.05	0	New
National Resistance Movement	2,383	0.04	0	New
Panagrarian Labour Movement of Greece	63	0.00	0	New
National Dawn	62	0.00	0	New
Liberty	12	0.00	0	New
Total	5,715,985	100.00	21	−1
Valid votes	5,715,985	96.20		
Invalid/blank votes	225,651	3.80		
Total votes	5,941,636	100.00		
Registered voters/turnout	10,013,834	59.33		
Source: Ikaria

=== Elected MEPs ===
Party	Parliamentary Group	MEPs
Coalition of the Radical Left	EUL–NGL	Manolis Glezos, Sofia Sakorafa, Dimitris Papadimoulis, Georgios Katrougalos, Konstantina Kouneva, Konstantinos Chrysogonos
New Democracy	EPP	Maria Spyraki, Manolis Kefalogiannis, Eliza Vozemberg, Giorgos Kyrtsos, Thodoris Zagorakis
Golden Dawn		Eleftherios Synadinos, Lambros Foundoulis, Georgios Epitideios
Olive Tree	S&D	Eva Kaili, Nikos Androulakis
The River	S&D	Giorgos Grammatikakis, Miltiadis Kyrkos
Communist Party of Greece		Konstantinos Papadakis, Sotiris Zarianopoulos
Independent Greeks		Notis Marias

== Reactions ==
=== Reactions by press ===
In the press, the conservative Kathimerini newspaper said that citizens had expressed displeasure, but didn't give SYRIZA "true momentum." The SYRIZA-linked daily I Avgi said SYRIZA's win was "historic" and a "milestone in the political history of Greece." Eleftherotypia criticised the government for trying to downplay SYRIZA's win, and said the result showed voters want "radical policy change." Left-leaning Efimerida ton Syntakton said the big loser was the government, and criticised Prime Minister Antonis Samaras for being more critical of SYRIZA than Golden Dawn. Ethnos said all parties were equally punished by the vote.

=== Reactions by politicians ===
Following his party's victory, SYRIZA leader Alexis Tsipras called for snap elections to be called "as soon as possible." Tsipras noted that if the results were replicated in a national election, the governing ND-PASOK coalition would have only 94 seats, in contrast to the 152 seats they had at the time of the election. SYRIZA warned that the result meant there was a disharmony between public opinion and the composition of parliament, and that the government lacked a mandate to proceed with any new austerity measures, particularly warning against water privatisation. On 26 May, the day after the election, Tsipras met with President Karolos Papoulias about the potential to hold new elections.

Prime Minister Antonis Samaras (ND) insisted the vote was not a cause for snap elections. In a televised address in the immediate aftermath of the vote, Samaras said that "those who tried to turn the EU election into a plebiscite failed." High-ranking ND officials held a meeting on 3 June to discuss how to woo back voters who had left the party, but were unable to come to a conclusion.

Evangelos Venizelos, leader of junior coalition party PASOK, came under fire from several MPs of his own party, who called on him to quit as leader following PASOK's mediocre result. In an editorial in Ta Nea, which criticised Venizelos' strategy, PASOK MP Costas Skandalidis said "nobody has the legitimacy to decide the fate of a historic party on his own." Skandalidis also urged Venizelos to develop closer contacts with SYRIZA. Venizelos hit back at his intra-party critics, calling them "fifth columnists" who were trying to "consciously undermine" him.

DIMAR leader Fotis Kouvelis announced on 28 May that he would offer his resignation as leader of his party, due to its poor result. However, DIMAR's central committee rejected his resignation. DIMAR and SYRIZA eyed closer co-operation following the vote, although a significant minority of DIMAR MPs support co-operating with PASOK instead. DIMAR decided to choose its political direction at a party conference, scheduled to be held 12–14 September 2014. Until then it was agreed Kouvelis would stay on as leader.

Panos Kammenos, leader of ANEL, also called a party conference due to his party's poor result, although he did not offer his resignation. Instead, Kammenos planned to discuss the possibility of co-operating with other right-wing anti-austerity groups, and offered invitations to several such parties to participate in ANEL's congress. Two ANEL MPs left the party after the election, with one saying the party had "lost its direction."

==== Cabinet reshuffle ====
While Prime Minister Samaras vowed to "stay the course," he acknowledged the government must "fix injustices" and planned a "radical" cabinet reshuffle in response to the vote. Key chances included having Finance Minister Yannis Stournaras replaced with former prime-ministerial adviser Gikas Hardouvelis, and ND MP Argyris Dinopoulos replacing Yiannis Michelakis as Interior Minister. Ex-LAOS MP Adonis Georgiadis was replaced as Health Minister by Makis Voridis, a fellow ex-LAOS member. Changes were also made to the Education Minister, Public Order Minister, Development Minister, Agricultural Development Minister, and government spokesperson.

Makis Vordis' appointment to the cabinet was a subject of controversy, with the Anti-Defamation League objecting to his appointment. The ADL claimed his appointment was at odds with the Prime Minister's stance on Golden Dawn. In the 1980s Vordis led the National Political Union, a youth group founded by ex-dictator Georgios Papadopoulos from inside prison, before getting kicked out for engaging in extremist acts. In the 1990s Vordis founded the Hellenic Front, a party with close links to the National Front in France.

Sofia Voultepsi, the newly appointed government spokesperson, was also considered a controversial choice. Prior to her appointment, she said the press was owned by "arms dealers, Rothschild, and bankers", and that undocumented migrants are "invaders" and "weapons in the hands of the Turks."

The new cabinet was sworn in on 10 June.
