= Opinion polling for the 2004 Greek parliamentary election =

Surveys of Greek public opinion between 2000 and 2004

In the run up to the 2004 Greek parliamentary election, various organizations carried out opinion polling to gauge voting intention in Greece during the term of the 11th Hellenic Parliament. Results of such polls are displayed in this article. The date range for these opinion polls is from the previous parliamentary election, held on 9 April 2000, to the day the next election was held, on 7 March 2004.

Polls are listed in reverse chronological order, showing the most recent first and using the dates when the survey fieldwork was done, as opposed to the date of publication. Where the fieldwork dates are unknown, the date of publication is given instead. The highest percentage figure in each polling survey is displayed with its background shaded in the leading party's colour. If a tie ensues, this is applied to the figures with the highest percentages. The "Lead" columns on the right shows the percentage-point difference between the parties with the highest percentages in a given poll.

== Voting intention estimates ==
=== Polling ===
The table below lists nationwide voting intention estimates. Refusals are generally excluded from the party vote percentages, while question wording and the treatment of "don't know" responses and those not intending to vote may vary between polling organisations. Polls that show their results without disregarding those respondents who were undecided or said they would abstain from voting (either physically or by voting blank) have been re-calculated by disregarding these numbers from the totals offered through a simple rule of three in order to obtain results comparable to other polls and the official election results. When available, seat projections are displayed below the percentages in a smaller font. 151 seats are required for an absolute majority in the Hellenic Parliament.

Color key:

Exit poll

| Polling firm/Commissioner | Fieldwork date | PASOK | ND | KKE | SYRIZA | DIKKI | KEP | LAOS | Lead |
|---|---|---|---|---|---|---|---|---|---|
| 2004 parliamentary election | 7 Mar 2004 | 40.6; 117 | 45.4; 165 | 5.9; 12 | 3.3; 6 | 1.8; 0 | – | 2.2; 0 | 4.8 |
| Metron Analysis | 17-23 Jan 2004 | 42.6 | 45.1 | 5.4 | 3.3 | 1.5 | – | 2.1 | 2.5 |
| Opinion | 16-21 Jan 2004 | 41.2 | 44.5 | 5.6 | 3.1 | 1.2 | – | 2.2 | 3.3 |
| DIMEL | 12-19 Jan 2004 | 41.7 | 45.3 | 5.9 | 3.0 | 1.5 | – | 1.2 | 3.6 |
| Metron Analysis | 10-14 Jan 2004 | 42.9 | 45.8 | 5.6 | 2.5 | 1.1 | – | 1.1 | 2.9 |
| Opinion | 8-14 Jan 2004 | 41.3 | 44.6 | 5.5 | 3.1 | 1.8 | – | 1.9 | 3.3 |
| Alco | 7-12 Jan 2004 | 42.0 | 44.7 | 5.6 | 2.8 | 1.8 | – | 1.6 | 2.7 |
| Kapa Research | Dec 2003 | 37.5 | 45.9 | 6.1 | 3.5 | 2.4 | – | 2.9 | 8.4 |
| Rass | Dec 2003 | 36.6 | 46.0 | 6.0 | 4.7 | 2.9 | – | 2.7 | 9.4 |
| MRB | Dec 2003 | 35.6 | 45.1 | 5.9 | 4.2 | 2.4 | – | 3.1 | 9.5 |
| Metron Analysis | Oct 2003 | 37.2 | 45.2 | 6.8 | 4.2 | 2.2 | – | 3.2 | 8.0 |
| MRB | Oct 2003 | 36.1 | 45.1 | 6.9 | 3.9 | 1.9 | – | 2.3 | 9.0 |
| VPRC | Sep 2003 | 36.4 | 45.9 | 5.5 | 3.4 | 2.0 | – | 2.8 | 9.5 |
| DIMEL | Sep 2003 | 38.8 | 46.9 | 6.1 | 3.1 | 2.4 | – | 1.0 | 8.1 |
| Kapa Research | Sep 2003 | 38.7 | 45.8 | 6.1 | 3.5 | 2.5 | – | 1.8 | 7.1 |
| Opinion | Sep 2003 | 37.0 | 46.0 | 6.8 | 2.9 | 1.8 | – | 2.4 | 9.0 |
| Metron Analysis | Sep 2003 | 36.9 | 45.1 | 7.3 | 4.4 | 2.2 | – | 2.6 | 8.2 |
| Rass | Sep 2003 | 36.5 | 45.8 | 6.3 | 4.6 | 2.9 | – | 1.8 | 9.3 |
| Alco | Sep 2003 | 37.4 | 45.0 | 6.0 | 3.5 | 2.4 | – | 2.3 | 7.6 |
| DIMEL | Sep 2003 | 37.6 | 48.4 | 4.8 | 3.5 | 2.7 | – | 2.5 | 10.8 |
| Prognosis | Jul 2003 | 34.2 | 47.0 | 8.3 | 3.8 | 1.8 | – | 2.6 | 12.8 |
| Metron Analysis | Jun 2003 | 36.4 | 45.9 | 6.8 | 4.4 | 2.4 | – | 2.6 | 9.5 |
| Alco | Jun 2003 | 36.5 | 46.4 | 5.9 | 3.6 | 2.7 | – | 2.3 | 9.9 |
| MRB | May-Jun 2003 | 34.9 | 44.6 | 6.2 | 4.6 | 2.9 | – | 2.8 | 9.7 |
| Kapa Research | May-Jun 2003 | 37.5 | 46.7 | 6.3 | 3.8 | 1.9 | – | 1.9 | 9.2 |
| Rass | May 2003 | 36.1 | 47.9 | 5.7 | 3.1 | 2.4 | – | 2.2 | 11.8 |
| Metron Analysis | Mar 2003 | 37.0 | 44.6 | 6.9 | 4.7 | 2.5 | – | 3.2 | 7.6 |
| MRB | Feb-Mar 2003 | 36.1 | 45.2 | 5.9 | 4.0 | 2.4 | – | 2.2 | 9.1 |
| Alco | Feb 2003 | 37.2 | 46.3 | 6.0 | 3.7 | 2.2 | – | 1.8 | 9.1 |
| Kapa Research | Dec 2002 | 38.2 | 44.6 | 6.2 | 3.5 | 2.3 | – | 3.1 | 6.4 |
| MRB | Nov 2002 | 36.9 | 43.9 | 6.0 | 4.0 | 2.5 | – | 2.6 | 7.0 |
| Metron Analysis | Nov 2002 | 37.2 | 45.3 | 6.6 | 4.2 | 2.3 | – | 3.0 | 8.1 |
| MRB | Sep 2002 | 35.4 | 43.9 | 6.5 | 3.9 | 2.6 | – | – | 8.5 |
| Kapa Research | Sep 2002 | 38.1 | 45.8 | 6.5 | 3.6 | 2.2 | – | – | 7.7 |
| Metron Analysis | Jul 2002 | 39.1 | 45.8 | 5.6 | 3.2 | 3.7 | – | – | 6.7 |
| Metron Analysis | Jun-Jul 2002 | 36.2 | 46.8 | 6.8 | 3.6 | 3.5 | – | – | 10.6 |
| MRB | Jun 2002 | 34.8 | 46.3 | 6.9 | 3.9 | 2.9 | – | – | 11.5 |
| Alco | Jun 2002 | 35.3 | 45.4 | 6.2 | 3.4 | 2.6 | 3.5 | – | 10.1 |
| VPRC | May 2002 | 34.8 | 45.9 | 6.1 | 3.6 | 2.8 | 3.4 | – | 11.1 |
| Kapa Research | Apr 2002 | 34.8 | 43.4 | 6.0 | 3.7 | 2.2 | 6.6 | – | 8.6 |
| Alco | Mar-Apr 2002 | 34.2 | 43.2 | 6.0 | 3.6 | 2.5 | 5.6 | – | 9.0 |
| MRB | Mar 2002 | 33.4 | 43.5 | 6.0 | 3.9 | 2.9 | 5.2 | – | 10.1 |
| Metron Analysis | Feb 2002 | 35.8 | 43.1 | 6.1 | 4.5 | 2.0 | 5.9 | – | 7.3 |
| Kapa Research | Dec 2001 | 36.8 | 43.1 | 6.0 | 2.9 | 2.0 | 6.5 | – | 6.3 |
| MRB | Nov-Dec 2001 | 34.6 | 42.7 | 5.8 | 3.7 | 1.7 | 7.5 | – | 8.1 |
| Metron Analysis | Nov 2001 | 36.7 | 42.8 | 6.4 | 3.8 | 2.3 | 5.8 | – | 6.1 |
| Opinion | Oct-Nov 2001 | 35.4 | 42.6 | 5.4 | 3.9 | 2.3 | 6.8 | – | 7.2 |
| Alco | Sep 2001 | 34.2 | 42.7 | 6.2 | 3.5 | 1.7 | 8.8 | – | 8.5 |
| Metron Analysis | Sep 2001 | 36.6 | 44.7 | 6.5 | 4.0 | 2.1 | 6.2 | – | 8.1 |
| VPRC | Sep 2001 | 33.5 | 41.2 | 5.9 | 4.2 | 2.6 | 8.4 | – | 7.7 |
| Kapa Research | Sep 2001 | 36.2 | 42.6 | 6.6 | 3.7 | 1.8 | 7.4 | – | 6.4 |
| VPRC | Jun-Jul 2001 | 28.3 | 41.8 | 5.1 | 3.9 | 2.2 | 15.0 | – | 13.5 |
| Metron Analysis | Jun-Jul 2001 | 33.7 | 42.3 | 6.2 | 4.2 | 2.2 | 8.6 | – | 8.6 |
| MRB | Jun 2001 | 30.9 | 41.4 | 6.7 | 4.0 | 2.3 | 10.0 | – | 10.5 |
| Kapa Research | May 2001 | 31.4 | 40.7 | 7.9 | 3.7 | 1.2 | 12.5 | – | 9.3 |
| Metron Analysis | May 2001 | 29.9 | 40.4 | 6.8 | 3.7 | 2.3 | 12.2 | – | 10.5 |
| Opinion | Mar 2001 | 32.2 | 36.7 | 5.4 | 3.4 | 2.1 | 15.5 | – | 4.5 |
| Kapa Research | Mar 2001 | 31.9 | 37.2 | 6.4 | 3.5 | 1.1 | 15.2 | – | 5.3 |
| Metron Analysis | Mar 2001 | 32.2 | 36.3 | 6.4 | 4.2 | 2.0 | 16.2 | – | 4.1 |
| VPRC | Jan 2001 | 31.0 | 36.2 | 6.2 | 3.1 | 1.3 | 18.8 | – | 5.2 |
| Kapa Research | Jan 2001 | 35.4 | 35.1 | 5.3 | 3.5 | – | 17.8 | – | 0.3 |
| Opinion | Oct 2000 | 39.4 | 42.6 | 6.2 | 4.2 | 2.3 | – | – | 3.2 |
| VPRC | Sep 2000 | 39.4 | 42.4 | 7.4 | 3.2 | 1.9 | – | – | 3.0 |
| 2000 parliamentary election | 9 Apr 2000 | 43.8; 158 | 42.7; 125 | 5.5; 11 | 3.2; 6 | 2.7; 0 | – | – | 1.1 |
