= Opinion polling for the 2007 Greek parliamentary election =

In the run up to the 2007 Greek parliamentary election, various organizations carried out opinion polling to gauge voting intention in Greece during the term of the 12th Hellenic Parliament. Results of such polls are displayed in this article. The date range for these opinion polls is from the previous parliamentary election, held on 7 March 2004, to the day the next election was held, on 16 September 2007.

Polls are listed in reverse chronological order, showing the most recent first and using the dates when the survey fieldwork was done, as opposed to the date of publication. Where the fieldwork dates are unknown, the date of publication is given instead. The highest percentage figure in each polling survey is displayed with its background shaded in the leading party's colour. If a tie ensues, this is applied to the figures with the highest percentages. The "Lead" columns on the right shows the percentage-point difference between the parties with the highest percentages in a given poll.

== Voting intention estimates ==
=== Polling ===
The table below lists nationwide voting intention estimates. Refusals are generally excluded from the party vote percentages, while question wording and the treatment of "don't know" responses and those not intending to vote may vary between polling organisations. Polls that show their results without disregarding those respondents who were undecided or said they would abstain from voting (either physically or by voting blank) have been re-calculated by disregarding these numbers from the totals offered through a simple rule of three in order to obtain results comparable to other polls and the official election results. When available, seat projections are displayed below the percentages in a smaller font. 151 seats are required for an absolute majority in the Hellenic Parliament.

Color key:

Exit poll

Polling firm/Commissioner	Fieldwork date	ND	PASOK	KKE	SYRIZA	LAOS	Lead
2007 parliamentary election	16 Sep 2007	41.8; 152	38.1; 102	8.2; 22	5.0; 14	3.8; 10	3.7
GPO/Mega TV	16 Sep 2007 (21:30)	42.0; 153	37.8; 101	8.2; 22	5.0; 13	4.0; 11	4.2
Rass/ERT	16 Sep 2007 (19:00)	41.2– 43.2	37.5– 39.5	7.0– 8.0	4.5– 5.5	3.0– 4.0	4.0
Metron Analysis/ANT1 TV	16 Sep 2007 (19:00)	40.2– 42.8; 149-155	36.5– 39.1; 100-104	7.5– 8.9; 20-24	5.0– 6.0; 12-16	3.5– 4.5; 8-12	3.7
MRB/Alpha TV	16 Sep 2007 (19:00)	40.8– 42.8; 151-152	37.5– 39.5; 103-104	7.5– 8.5; 21	4.5– 6.0; 14	3.5– 4.5; 10-11	3.3
Alco/Alter TV	16 Sep 2007 (19:00)	40.6– 42.6	37.8– 39.8	6.4– 8.0	4.6– 5.8	3.3– 4.3	2.8
GPO/Mega TV	16 Sep 2007 (19:00)	41.0– 43.0; 149-154	37.5– 39.5; 100-105	7.5– 9.0; 20-24	4.5– 6.0; 12-15	3.5– 4.0; 9-11	3.5
VPRC/Skai TV	16 Sep 2007 (19:00)	41.0– 43.0; 149-154	36.0– 38.0; 96-99	7.5– 9.5; 21-23	5.0– 6.0; 15-16	3.5– 4.5; 10-11	5.0
VPRC	31 Aug 2007	42.0	38.0	8.5	5.0	4.0	4.0
Alco	31 Aug 2007	40.1	39.2	8.3	4.7	4.6	0.9
ΜRΒ	31 Aug 2007	40.8	38.4	8.6	5.4	4.3	2.4
GPO	31 Aug 2007	40.6	39.0	8.2	4.6	5.1	1.6
Marc	30 Aug 2007	38.5	38.1	9.9	5.3	4.8	0.4
VPRC	30 Aug 2007	41.5	38.0	8.5	5.0	4.0	3.5
Alco	29 Aug 2007	41.9	41.0	8.2	4.5	4.4	0.9
GPO	29 Aug 2007	40.3	39.0	7.8	5.0	5.5	1.3
Metron Analysis	29 Aug 2007	38.7	36.6	10.5	6.1	4.6	2.1
ΜRΒ	28 Aug 2007	39.6	37.3	8.2	4.9	4.4	2.3
Alco	27 Aug 2007	41.6	40.7	7.7	4.0	4.3	0.9
Kapa Research	26 Aug 2007	40.4	38.9	8.3	5.7	4.8	1.5
MRB	23 Aug 2007	41.7	39.5	7.7	5.1	4.5	2.2
Metron Analysis	22 Aug 2007	39.8	37.9	9.0	5.5	4.5	1.9
GPO	22 Aug 2007	41.8	39.9	8.2	4.8	5.3	1.9
VPRC	16 Jul 2007	42.5	38.5	7.5	4.5	3.5	4.0
Kapa Research	30 Jun 2007	41.1	39.9	8.6	4.9	4.8	1.2
Metron Analysis	21 Jun 2007	42.5	41.3	7.4	4.4	4.4	1.2
Rass	15-21 Jun 2007	42.3	39.7	8.8	4.7	4.6	2.6
MRB	15 Jun 2007	42.5	39.8	8.2	5.2	4.3	1.2
Alco	15 Jun 2007	41.3	41.1	7.6	3.5	4.0	0.2
VPRC	8 Jun 2007	43.0	39.0	7.0	4.5	4.0	4.0
GPO	4 Jun 2007	40.0	38.8	8.0	5.0	5.5	1.2
Metron Analysis	2 Jun 2007	41.6	39.9	8.5	4.5	5.5	1.7
MRB	24 May 2007	42.1	39.7	7.4	5.2	5.5	2.4
VPRC	13 May 2007	42.5	39.5	6.5	5.0	3.5	3.0
Metron Analysis	1-13 May 2007	41.8	40.3	8.1	5.4	4.4	1.5
GPO	27-30 Apr 2007	41.3	40.0	8.5	4.8	5.4	1.3
MRB	27 Apr 2007	42.8	39.9	8.0	4.9	4.4	2.9
Metron Analysis	13-27 Apr 2007	42.3	40.4	7.0	5.5	4.8	1.9
GPO	13-27 Apr 2007	41.9	39.9	8.4	4.7	5.2	2.0
VPRC	13 Apr 2007	42.5	39.0	7.0	4.5	4.0	3.5
GPO	2 Apr 2007	41.6	39.6	8.1	4.6	5.2	2.0
Kapa Research	30 Mar 2007	42.4	41.2	8.0	3.9	4.5	1.2
Alco	30 Mar 2007	43.6	42.9	7.1	3.6	2.8	0.7
MRB	22-30 Mar 2007	42.8	39.7	8.2	4.4	5.0	3.1
Metron Analysis	22 Mar 2007	42.8	41.4	8.1	3.6	4.2	1.4
VPRC	11 Mar 2007	43.0	39.5	7.0	4.5	3.5	3.5
MRB	25-28 Feb 2007	43.3	39.5	9.2	3.7	4.4	3.8
GPO	25-28 Feb 2007	42.9	39.5	8.0	4.6	5.0	3.4
Rass	25 Feb 2007	44.8	41.4	7.1	3.4	3.3	3.4
VPRC	11 Feb 2007	43.0	39.5	7.5	4.0	3.5	3.5
Kapa Research	10 Feb 2007	42.8	41.0	8.4	4.1	3.7	1.8
GPO	1-10 Feb 2007	42.7	40.5	7.8	4.4	4.6	2.2
GPO	15 Jan 2007	41.6	39.0	8.5	4.8	5.3	2.6
VPRC	14 Jan 2007	43.0	39.0	7.5	4.0	3.5	4.0
Kapa Research	Dec 2006	42.2	41.0	8.6	4.3	3.9	1.2
Rass	Dec 2006	43.5	40.4	8.7	4.1	3.3	3.1
Metron Analysis	Dec 2006	43.1	41.1	7.0	4.2	4.5	2.0
VPRC	Dec 2006	43.0	38.5	7.5	4.5	3.5	4.5
GPO	Dec 2006	42.6	40.8	7.7	4.2	4.7	1.8
MRB	Dec 2006	43.8	40.3	8.3	3.6	3.9	3.5
Alco	Nov 2006	43.3	40.8	8.1	3.9	3.9	2.5
GPO	Nov 2006	42.3	38.5	8.5	4.6	5.0	3.8
ΜRB	Nov 2006	43.2	39.5	8.3	4.8	4.2	3.7
VPRC	Nov 2006	42.5	38.5	8.0	4.5	4.0	4.0
Kapa Research	Oct 2006	43.6	40.3	8.5	3.9	3.7	3.3
Metron Analysis	Oct 2006	43.3	39.2	7.7	5.4	4.5	4.1
Kapa Research	Oct 2006	42.4	40.1	7.6	3.8	3.4	2.3
GPO	Oct 2006	41.8	39.6	8.9	4.9	4.9	2.2
VPRC	Oct 2006	42.5	38.5	8.0	4.5	4.0	4.0
VPRC	Sep 2006	42.5	38.5	8.0	4.5	4.0	4.0
GPO	Sep 2006	41.9	38.8	9.7	4.6	5.1	3.1
Metron Analysis	Aug 2006	42.9	40.2	8.4	4.2	4.2	2.7
VPRC	Jul 2006	42.0	38.0	8.5	4.5	4.5	4.0
Metron Analysis	Jun 2006	41.6	40.1	8.8	3.9	5.6	1.5
MRB	Jun 2006	43.1	40.1	8.5	3.6	4.6	3.0
VPRC	Jun 2006	41.5	38.5	8.5	4.5	4.5	3.0
GPO	Jun 2006	41.4	39.0	9.0	4.4	6.2	2.4
Kapa Research	May 2006	42.0	39.9	8.3	4.0	5.8	2.1
Marc	May 2006	41.3	40.3	8.6	4.9	5.0	1.0
Metron Analysis	May 2006	41.8	40.6	8.2	3.7	5.6	1.2
VPRC	May 2006	42.0	39.0	8.0	4.0	4.0	3.0
GPO	Apr 2006	41.5	40.5	8.5	3.7	5.9	1.0
VPRC	Apr 2006	41.5	39.5	9.0	3.0	4.0	2.0
DIMEL	Apr 2006	42.2	44.7	6.8	3.5	2.8	2.5
GPO	Mar 2006	41.7	40.5	7.7	3.8	6.2	1.2
Metron Analysis	Mar 2006	41.2	41.5	8.4	3.9	5.0	0.3
VPRC	Mar 2006	42.0	39.5	8.0	3.5	4.5	2.5
Kapa Research	Mar 2006	41.2	40.4	8.4	3.9	6.0	0.8
MRB	Mar 2006	41.8	40.5	8.4	3.8	5.6	1.3
Kapa Research	Mar 2006	41.3	40.7	8.5	3.9	5.6	0.6
Metron Analysis	Mar 2006	41.5	41.3	7.8	4.5	4.9	0.2
Rass	Mar 2006	40.3	39.9	7.9	4.8	7.0	0.4
Alco	Feb 2006	40.7	41.2	8.0	3.4	6.7	0.5
GPO	Feb 2006	41.9	40.2	7.8	3.9	6.2	1.7
Kapa Research	Feb 2006	42.2	39.8	8.2	3.8	5.9	2.4
MRB	Feb 2006	42.9	40.2	8.1	4.1	4.7	2.7
VPRC	Feb 2006	41.5	39.5	8.0	3.5	5.0	2.0
GPO	Jan 2006	41.3	38.9	8.9	4.4	6.5	2.4
VPRC	Jan 2006	42.0	39.5	8.0	3.5	4.5	2.5
Kapa Research	Dec 2005	39.4	38.0	8.3	4.5	6.4	1.4
MRB	Dec 2005	41.8	39.3	8.3	3.9	4.1	2.5
GPO	Dec 2005	39.5	37.9	8.6	4.9	5.7	1.6
VPRC	Dec 2005	42.0	39.5	8.0	4.0	4.0	2.5
VPRC	Nov 2005	42.5	39.0	8.0	4.5	3.5	3.5
GPO	Nov 2005	41.7	38.7	8.0	4.7	4.0	3.0
Metron Analysis	Nov 2005	40.7	40.0	8.7	4.6	4.9	0.7
Alco	Oct 2005	41.9	40.4	7.9	3.6	4.1	1.5
VPRC	Oct 2005	42.5	39.0	8.0	5.0	3.0	3.5
GPO	Oct 2005	41.4	37.8	8.1	4.7	3.6	3.6
GPO	Sep 2005	43.3	38.4	7.5	4.7	3.5	4.9
VPRC	Sep 2005	42.5	38.5	7.5	5.0	3.0	4.0
VPRC	Jul 2005	43.0	39.0	7.0	4.5	3.5	4.0
Metron Analysis	Jun 2005	41.6	38.8	8.8	5.0	4.6	2.8
VPRC	Jun 2005	43.5	38.0	7.0	5.0	3.0	5.5
MRB	May 2005	43.6	39.0	7.6	4.0	3.3	4.6
VPRC	May 2005	43.5	39.0	6.5	4.0	3.0	4.5
Kapa Research	May 2005	43.0	40.3	7.5	3.6	4.0	2.7
VPRC	Apr 2005	43.5	39.5	6.5	4.0	3.0	4.0
MRB	Apr 2005	43.5	39.7	7.6	3.9	2.9	3.8
Kapa Research	Mar 2005	44.1	39.1	6.9	4.2	3.5	5.0
Opinion	Mar 2005	42.8	37.9	7.0	4.4	4.1	4.9
VPRC	Mar 2005	44.5	40.0	7.0	3.5	3.0	4.5
Metron Analysis	Feb 2005	42.8	37.9	7.0	4.4	4.1	4.9
GPO	Feb 2005	44.8	38.1	7.7	3.4	3.5	6.7
VPRC	Jan 2005	46.0	39.0	7.0	3.5	2.5	7.0
MRB	Dec 2004	44.6	37.5	8.0	4.2	3.5	7.1
VPRC	Dec 2004	47.0	38.0	7.5	3.0	2.5	9.0
GPO	Dec 2004	46.0	38.3	7.1	3.7	3.2	7.7
Alco	Nov 2004	44.7	37.7	7.9	3.8	3.8	7.0
VPRC	Nov 2004	48.0	36.5	7.5	2.5	2.0	11.5
Metron Analysis	Oct 2004	45.3	38.4	7.2	4.3	3.3	6.9
MRB	Oct 2004	46.8	37.4	7.3	4.4	2.4	9.4
VPRC	Oct 2004	48.0	37.5	8.0	2.5	2.0	10.5
GPO	Sep 2004	46.7	38.1	6.8	3.5	3.2	8.6
Kapa Research	Sep 2004	48.0	39.3	6.9	2.7	2.0	8.7
VPRC	Jun 2004	45.5	35.5	9.0	4.5	3.0	10.0
GPO	May 2004	45.4	36.2	8.4	4.2	2.9	9.2
VPRC	May 2004	42.0	34.0	7.0	3.5	2.5	8.0
Opinion	May 2004	46.7	37.4	6.5	3.8	2.7	9.3
Metron Analysis	May 2004	45.9	37.5	7.9	4.3	2.5	8.4
Αlco	May 2004	44.8	36.5	8.5	4.6	3.1	8.3
MRB	May 2004	46.0	37.4	7.4	4.1	2.3	8.6
MRB	May 2004	46.4	37.9	7.1	4.3	2.4	8.5
VPRC	May 2004	41.5	33.5	7.0	4.0	3.0	8.0
GPO	May 2004	45.6	37.0	8.0	4.0	3.2	8.6
Opinion	May 2004	47.9	37.7	6.6	4.2	2.7	10.2
Metron Analysis	May 2004	45.8	38.0	6.5	4.2	2.5	7.8
Metron Analysis	May 2004	45.6	35.7	7.1	5.1	3.7	9.9
Kapa Research	May 2004	46.2	38.3	7.0	3.8	2.6	7.9
VPRC	Apr 2004	47.5	36.0	8.0	4.0	2.5	11.5
Prognosis	Apr 2004	47.6	39.3	6.8	3.7	–	8.3
GPO	Apr 2004	45.1	37.6	7.6	4.5	2.8	7.5
2004 parliamentary election	7 Mar 2004	45.4; 165	40.6; 117	5.9; 12	3.3; 6	2.2; 0	4.8
