= Greek Ecologists =

Greek Ecologists Έλληνες Οικολόγοι
- President: Dimosthenis Vergis
- Founded: 1986
- Dissolved: 2023
- Ideology: Pacifism; Political satire Ecologism; Progressivism

The Greek Ecologists (Greek: Έλληνες Οικολόγοι, romanized: Ellines Oikologoi), previously the Union of Ecologists (Greek: Ένωση Οικολόγων, romanized: Énosi Ikológon), was a Greek "fringe" and "bizarre ecological party".

The party's president was Dimosthenis Vergis, a former auto-worker, trade unionist, journalist, and peace activist. Vergis has been described as a "self-styled ecologist" and "a self-styled, modern-day Dionysus – God of wine, revelry and fertility".

Vergis usually deploys naked female party workers in his campaigns and has posed nude for campaign posters and pamphlets, flirting "with any female journalist that comes within groping distance". He supports the legalisation of cannabis and unrestricted nudism.

The Greek Ecologists and its leader are not accepted as a Green party by the Ecologist Greens, which enjoys international recognition as Greece's green party. The Ecologist Greens have condemned Vergis, stating: "The public can be assured that the political culture of Ecologist Greens and the Green movement, in general, has nothing to do with behaviour that makes a mockery or which, through strange – at least – and disastrous interests (such as abuses, money laundering), has damaged the interest in the environment and the political perspectives of ecology in Greece."

== History ==
In 1997, an Athens prosecutor issued a warrant for Vergis' arrest after his party published a poster in which he appeared nude with a smaller picture of International Association of Athletics Federations president Primo Nebiolo inset near Vergis' genitals.

In August 1998, lawyers representing the Archbishop of Athens successfully went to court to prevent the party using a poster in the municipal elections showing Vergis shaking hands with the archbishop.

During the 2000 general election, in which he openly campaigned with semi-nude models, Vergis was described as a "joker" by deputy labour minister Christos Protopappas.

The party was prohibited from participating in the 2004 general election on the order of the Greek supreme court. Subsequently it was renamed to Greek Ecologists.

For the 2009 European election, the famous trash TV singer Nikos Katelis (well known as Katman) became a candidate for this party. His speech in Kolonaki square was shown live on Alter Channel. He lost the elections.

In the May 2023 election, the party received only one vote.

In the June 2023 election, the party received no votes.

== Electoral results ==
Results since 1993 (year links to election page)
Year	Type of Election	Votes	%	Mandates	Notes
1993	Parliament	5,378	0.08	–	as Union of Ecologists
1994	European Parliament	–	–	–	as Union of Ecologists
1996	Parliament	19,934	0.29	–	as Union of Ecologists
1999	European Parliament	30,684	0.48	–	as Union of Ecologists
2000	Parliament	20,466	0.30	–	as Union of Ecologists
2004	Parliament	–	–	–	–
2004	European Parliament	32,956	0.54	–	as Greek Ecologists
2007	Parliament	1,740	0.02	–	as Greek Ecologists
2009	European Parliament	31,188	0.61	–	as Greek Ecologists
2009	Parliament	20,019	0.29	–	as Greek Ecologists
May 2012	Parliament	66	0.00	–	as Greek Ecologists
June 2012	Parliament	–	–	–	as Greek Ecologists
2014	European Parliament	5,608	0.10	–	as Greek Ecologists
2019	European Parliament	11,511	0.20	–	as Greek Ecologists
2019	Parliament	0	0.00	–	as Greek Ecologists
May 2023	Parliament	1	0.00	–	as Greek Ecologists
June 2023	Parliament	0	0.00	–	as Greek Ecologists
