= 2000 Greek parliamentary election =

- 9 April 2000

All 300 seats in the Hellenic Parliament 151 seats needed for a majority
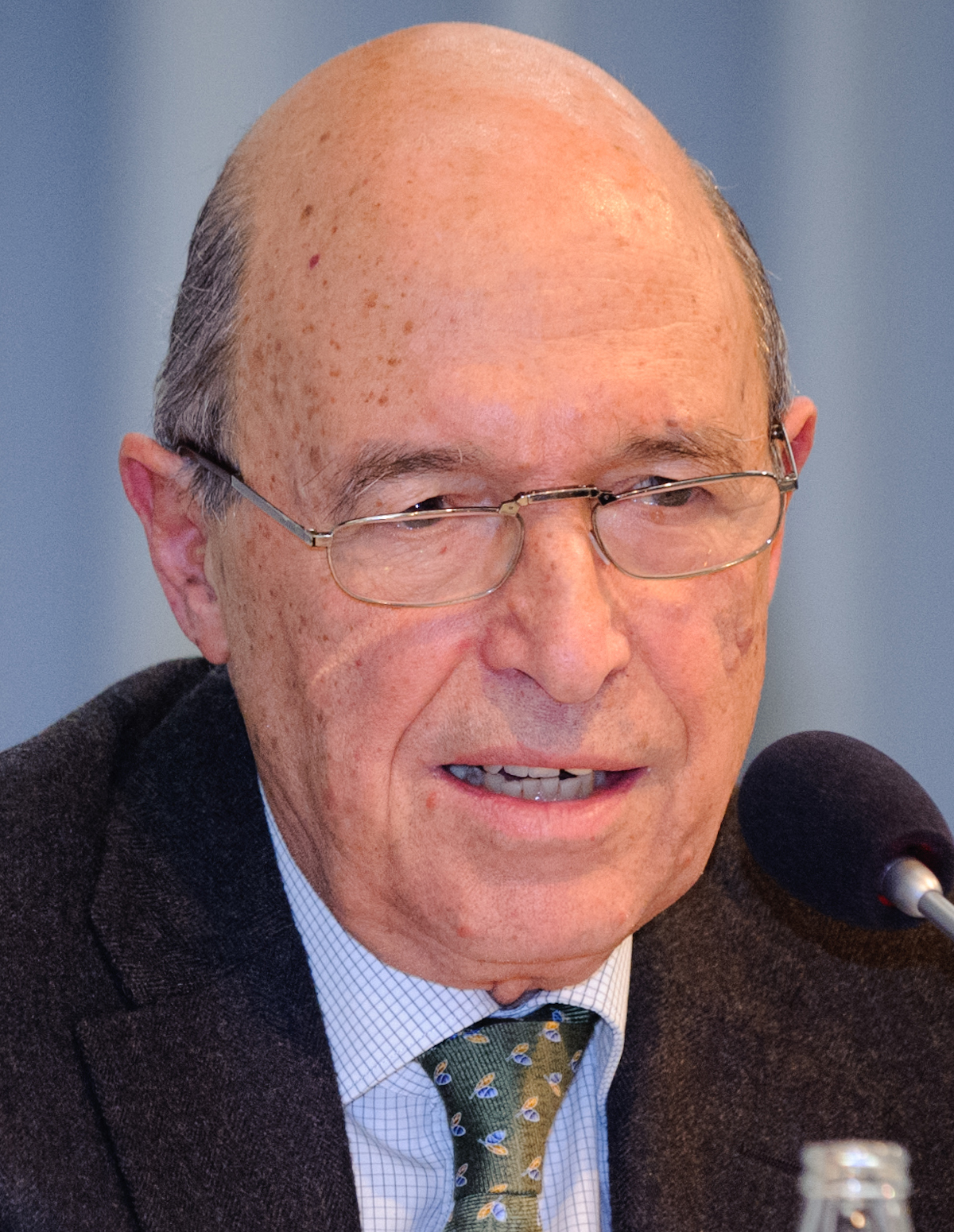

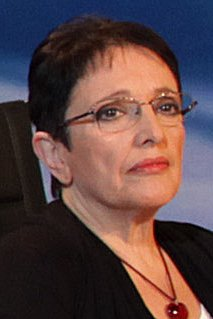

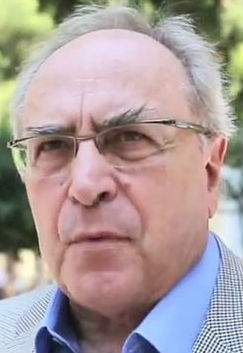
	First party	Second party
Leader	Costas Simitis	Kostas Karamanlis
Party	PASOK	ND
Last election	162 seats, 41.49%	38.12%, 108 seats
Seats won	158	125
Seat change	▼4	▲17
Popular vote	3,008,081	2,934,948
Percentage	43.80%	42.73%
Swing	▲2.31 pp	▲4.61 pp
	Third party	Fourth party
Leader	Aleka Papariga	Nikos Konstantopoulos
Party	KKE	Synaspismos
Last election	5.61%, 11 seats	5.12%, 10 seats
Seats won	11	6
Seat change	Steady	▼4
Popular vote	379,280	219,988
Percentage	5.52%	3.20%
Swing	▼0.09 pp	▼1.92 pp
- Results by constituency
Prime Minister before election
Costas Simitis
PASOK
Prime Minister after election
Costas Simitis
PASOK

Parliamentary elections were held in Greece on 9 April 2000. The ruling PASOK of Prime Minister Costas Simitis was narrowly re-elected, defeating the conservative New Democracy party. Simitis formed his third cabinet.

The election was characterized by the large electoral increase in support for both PASOK, and New Democracy.

== Opinion polls ==
Polling firm/commissioner	Fieldwork date	PASOK	ND	KKE	Syn	DIKKI	POLAN	Fil	Lead
2000 parliamentary election	9 Apr 2000	43.8; 158	42.7; 125	5.5; 11	3.2; 6	2.7; 0	–	–	1.1
Opinion/Mega exit poll	9 Apr 2000 (19:00)	41.5–44.0	42.5–44.5	5.5–6.0	3.0–4.0	2.0–3.0	–	–	0.8
Metron Analysis/ANT1 exit poll	9 Apr 2000 (19:00)	41.7–44.1	41.6–44.0	4.4–5.6	3.3–4.5	2.1–3.1	–	–	0.1
Kappa Research/Star exit poll	9 Apr 2000 (19:00)	42.4	43.2	5.3	3.7	2.8	–	–	0.8
Alco/Alpha exit poll	9 Apr 2000 (19:00)	41.4–42.4	42.2–43.2	5.5–6.1	3.8–4.4	2.6–3.1	–	–	0.8
Sofres/ERT exit poll	9 Apr 2000 (19:00)	43.2	42.9	5.3	3.7	2.8	–	–	0.3
Alco/Alpha	16-22 Mar 2000	41.5	41.3	6.0	4.5	4.8	–	–	0.2
Opinion/Mega	14-20 Mar 2000	40.6	40.1	5.7	4.5	4.7	–	–	0.5
Alco/Alpha	6-15 Mar 2000	40.8	40.1	5.7	4.5	5.7	–	–	0.7
MRB	7-13 Mar 2000	40.4	40.1	5.7	4.7	4.2	–	–	0.3
Kappa Research/Star	9-11 Mar 2000	42.1	41.7	5.5	4.7	4.3	–	–	0.4
Metron Analysis/ANT1	1-11 Mar 2000	41.9	40.8	4.9	4.4	4.6	–	–	1.1
Metron Analysis/ANT1	22 Feb-6 Mar 2000	41.4	40.4	5.6	4.8	5.1	–	0.5	1.0
VPRC	14 Feb-5 Mar 2000	41.3	39.0	5.7	4.9	5.0	0.7	0.3	2.3
Data Research	7 Feb-3 Mar 2000	40.6	41.8	5.7	3.5	5.6	–	–	1.2
MRB	15 Feb-1 Mar 2000	43.1	40.6	5.8	4.6	4.3	0.5	1.1	2.5
Alco/Alpha	15-25 Feb 2000	40.8	39.9	6.0	4.0	4.3	–	0.6	0.9
Opinion/Mega	8-16 Feb 2000	42.6	39.5	6.2	3.8	4.0	0.6	0.7	3.1
Alco/Alpha	25 Jan-3 Feb 2000	39.4	40.8	6.2	4.3	5.3	0.5	1.0	1.4
Kappa Research/Star	20 Jan-3 Feb 2000	41.2	40.3	5.5	4.0	3.8	1.4	0.8	0.9
Data Research	7-23 Jan 2000	38.9	40.6	6.6	4.8	7.2	0.2	0.5	1.7
VPRC	2-22 Dec 1999	38.4	40.6	6.4	4.4	5.3	0.6	0.6	2.2
MRB	24 Nov-9 Dec 1999	39.0	37.7	6.9	4.9	5.9	1.7	0.6	1.3
Metron Analysis/ANT1	2-16 Nov 1999	39.3	37.8	6.3	5.8	6.8	1.3	0.6	1.5
Alco/Alpha	29 Sep-12 Oct 1999	36.5	39.9	7.4	4.7	6.4	1.5	0.8	3.4
Opinion/Mega	16-30 Sep 1999	36.6	37.3	6.6	3.4	6.9	1.1	0.7	0.7
VPRC	17-29 Sep 1999	36.0	39.2	6.4	5.4	6.6	1.3	0.9	3.2
Metron Analysis/ANT1	14-24 Sep 1999	39.1	38.2	6.5	5.1	6.0	1.3	1.3	0.9
Metron Analysis	10-18 Jul 1999	37.3	38.2	7.3	5.4	6.1	1.2	1.2	0.9
1999 European election	13 Jun 1999	32.9	36.0	8.7	5.2	6.9	2.3	1.6	3.1
Metron Analysis	19 May-11 Jun 1999	35.1	37.2	7.6	6.4	7.2	2.4	1.6	2.1
Metron Analysis	29 May-8 Jun 1999	35.0	38.1	7.4	6.0	7.5	1.4	1.5	3.1
Metron Analysis	12-23 May 1999	36.3	38.8	6.8	6.2	5.8	2.7	1.2	2.5
Metron Analysis	22 Apr-3 May 1999	36.3	40.5	6.3	7.3	5.7	2.1	–	4.2
Metron Analysis	24 Mar-1 Apr 1999	36.9	38.8	6.8	7.4	6.2	2.5	–	1.9
Metron Analysis	25 Jan-3 Feb 1999	35.9	41.4	5.6	6.0	6.5	2.3	–	5.5
1996 parliamentary election	22 Sep 1996	41.5; 162	38.1; 108	5.6; 11	5.1; 10	4.4; 9	2.9; 0	–	3.4

== Results ==
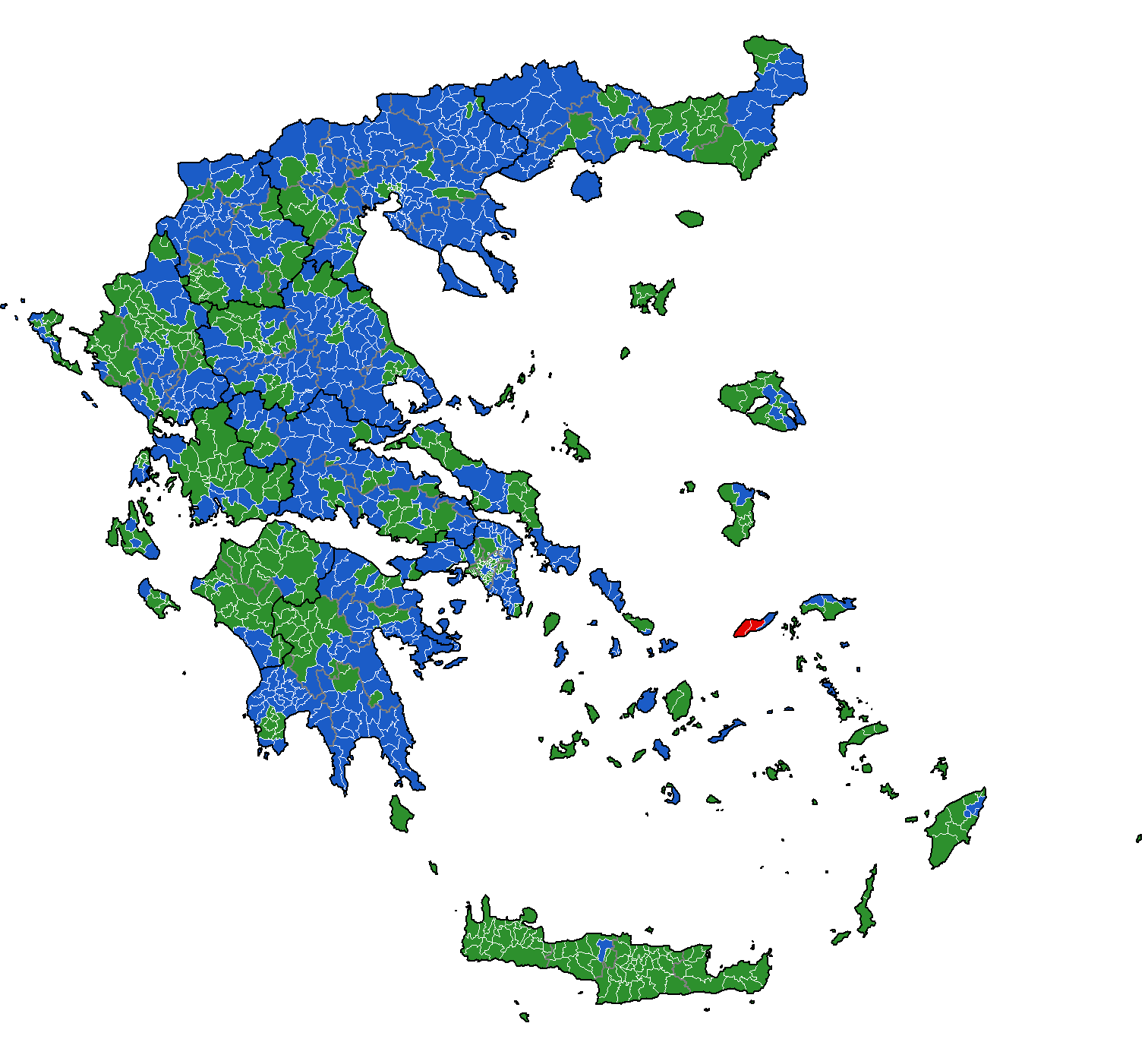
Results, showing the winning party in each municipal unit.

Party	Votes	%	Seats	+/–
PASOK	3,008,081	43.80	158	–4
New Democracy	2,934,948	42.73	125	+17
Communist Party of Greece	379,280	5.52	11	0
Synaspismos	219,988	3.20	6	–4
Democratic Social Movement	184,648	2.69	0	–9
Democratic Regional Union	32,149	0.47	0	New
Union of Centrists	23,218	0.34	0	0
Union of Ecologists	20,523	0.30	0	0
National Coalition	14,688	0.21	0	New
Front Line – Hellenic Front	12,192	0.18	0	New
Radical Left Front	8,183	0.12	0	New
Communist Party of Greece (Marxist–Leninist)	7,325	0.11	0	New
Party of Hellenism	6,241	0.09	0	0
Left! – M-L KKE	5,879	0.09	0	0
Alternative Ecologists	3,291	0.05	0	0
Liberal Party	2,123	0.03	0	New
Fighting Socialist Party of Greece	2,044	0.03	0	0
Autonomous Revolutionary Political Movement	1,153	0.02	0	0
Organization for the Reconstruction of the KKE	1,139	0.02	0	0
Christopistía	260	0.00	0	0
Party of Greek Workers	153	0.00	0	0
National Patriotic Party	23	0.00	0	New
Olympic Party	4	0.00	0	0
Panhellenic Democratic Party of Peace	4	0.00	0	New
Independents	592	0.01	0	0
Total	6,868,129	100.00	300	0
Valid votes	6,868,129	97.74		
Invalid/blank votes	158,501	2.26		
Total votes	7,026,630	100.00		
Registered voters/turnout	9,277,277	75.74		
Source: Nohlen & Stöver
