= Party of Hellenism =

Party of Hellenism Κόμμα Ελληνισμού
- Leader: Sotiris Sofianopoulos
- Founded: 1981
- Dissolved: 2004
- Merged into: Popular Orthodox Rally
- Ideology: National conservatism Nationalism; Populism
- Political position: Far-right

The Hellenism Party (Greek: Κόμμα Ελληνισμού) was a Greek political party with a strongly nationalist platform, founded in 1981. Sotiris Sofianopoulos was the President of the Hellenism Party since its foundation. In 2004, the party collaborated with the Popular Orthodox Rally (LAOS) in the Greek elections of that year.

== Electoral results ==
Results 1996-2000 (year links to election page)
Year	Type of Election	Votes	%	Mandates
1996	Parliament	12,205	0.18%	0
1999	European Parliament	16,608	0.26%	0
2000	Parliament	6,272	0.09%	0
2004	Parliament	participated with LAOS	-	0
