= Voskopoulos =

Voskopoulos (Greek: Βοσκόπουλος) is a Greek surname. Notable people with the surname include:

- Pavlos Voskopoulos (born 1964), Greek politician
- Tolis Voskopoulos (1940–2021), Greek singer, actor, and composer
