= 1996 Greek parliamentary election =

- 22 September 1996

All 300 seats in the Hellenic Parliament 151 seats needed for a majority
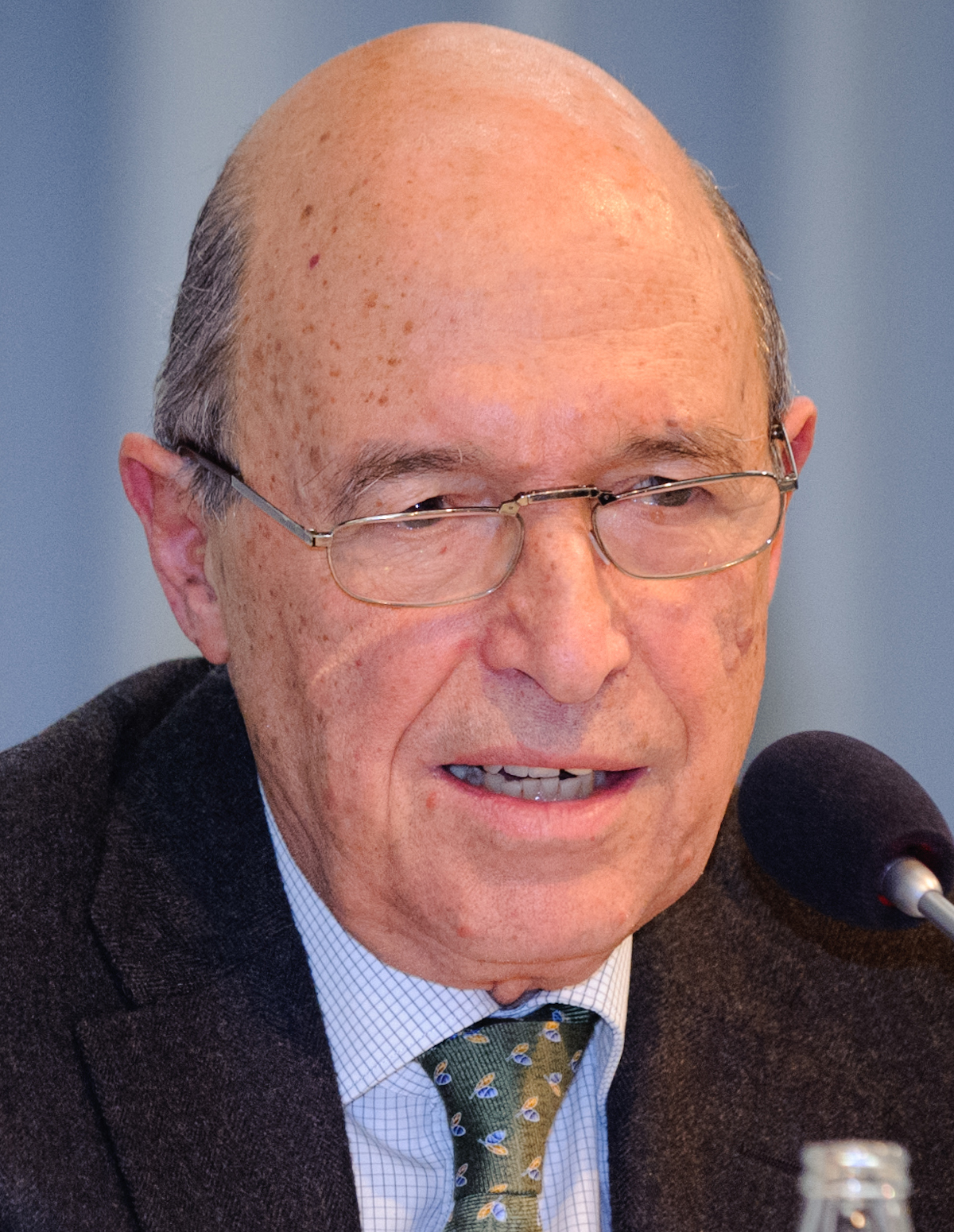

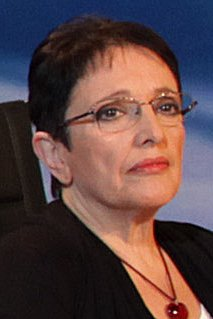

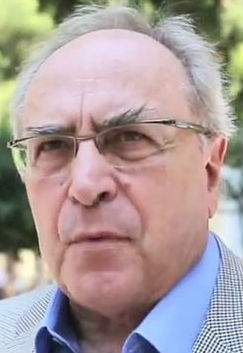
	First party	Second party	Third party
Leader	Costas Simitis	Miltiadis Evert	Aleka Papariga
Party	PASOK	ND	KKE
Last election	46.88%, 170 seats	39.30%, 111 seats	4.54%, 9 seats
Seats won	162	108	11
Seat change	▼8	▼3	▲2
Popular vote	2,813,245	2,584,765	380,167
Percentage	41.49%	38.12%	5.60%
Swing	▼5.39 pp	▼1.18 pp	▲1.06 pp
	Fourth party	Fifth party
Leader	Nikos Konstantopoulos	Dimitris Tsovolas
Party	Synaspismos	DIKKI
Last election	2.94%, 0 seats	–
Seats won	10	9
Seat change	▲10	New
Popular vote	347,051	300,617
Percentage	5.12%	4.43%
Swing	▲2.18 pp	New
- Results by constituency
Prime Minister before election
Costas Simitis
PASOK
Prime Minister after election
Costas Simitis
PASOK

Parliamentary elections were held in Greece on 22 September 1996. The ruling PASOK of Costas Simitis was re-elected, defeating the liberal-conservative New Democracy party of Miltiadis Evert.

== Results ==
Party	Votes	%	Seats	+/–
PASOK	2,814,779	41.49	162	–8
New Democracy	2,586,089	38.12	108	–3
Communist Party of Greece	380,046	5.60	11	+2
Synaspismos	347,236	5.12	10	+10
Democratic Social Movement	300,954	4.44	9	New
Political Spring	199,686	2.94	0	–10
Union of Centrists	48,659	0.72	0	0
Union of Ecologists	19,931	0.29	0	0
Party of Greek Hunters	17,472	0.26	0	0
National Party – National Political Union	16,495	0.24	0	0
Party of Hellenism	12,216	0.18	0	New
Left Struggle	10,416	0.15	0	0
Alternative Ecologists	5,708	0.08	0	New
Golden Dawn	4,537	0.07	0	New
Ecologists of Greece	4,138	0.06	0	0
Marxist–Leninist Communist Party of Greece	4,019	0.06	0	New
Organization for the Reconstruction of the KKE – Rainbow	3,534	0.05	0	0
Pensioners-Labourers-Farmers-Youth Alliance	2,519	0.04	0	New
Fighting Socialist Party of Greece	2,113	0.03	0	0
Olympic Party	1,614	0.02	0	0
Party of Greek Workers	238	0.00	0	New
Greek Orthodox National Popular Revolutionary Party	163	0.00	0	New
Christopistía	71	0.00	0	0
Free Democracy	64	0.00	0	New
Hellenic White Movement of Contemporary Ideology	49	0.00	0	0
Panhellenic Orthodox Democratic Movement	42	0.00	0	New
Labour Class	31	0.00	0	New
Human Rights Party	12	0.00	0	0
Party of Responsible Citizens	2	0.00	0	0
Hellenic European Party	1	0.00	0	0
Independents	611	0.01	0	0
Total	6,783,445	100.00	300	0
Valid votes	6,783,445	97.15		
Invalid/blank votes	198,759	2.85		
Total votes	6,982,204	100.00		
Registered voters/turnout	9,145,598	76.34		
Source: Nohlen & Stöver
