= Organization for the Reconstruction of the Communist Party of Greece =

Organization for the Reconstruction of the Communist Party of Greece Οργάνωση για την Ανασυγκρότηση του ΚΚΕ Orgánosi gia tin Anasigkrótisi tou Kommounistikoú Kómmatos Elládas
- Abbreviation: OAKKE
- Leader: Ilias Zafeiropoulos
- Founded: 1985
- Split from: EKKE; M-L KKE
- Headquarters: Halkokondili 35, 104 32 Athens
- Ideology: Marxism-Leninism-Maoism; Pro-Europeanism; Anti-Russian sentiment pro-Zionism
- Political position: Far-left
- Colours: Red

Website
- oakke.gr

The Organization for the Reconstruction of the Communist Party of Greece (Greek: Οργάνωση για την Ανασυγκρότηση του Κομμουνιστικού Κόμματος Ελλάδας (ΟΑΚΚΕ), romanized: Orgánosi gia tin Anasigkrótisi tou Kommounistikoú Kómmatos Elládas), mostly known by its acronym OAKKE, is a minor Greek political party known for its strong anti-Russian positions. The Secretary of the Central Committee of OAKKE is Ilias Zafiropoulos.

OAKKE was established in 1985 and is part of the Greek far-left, and it stems from the multiple splits of the Greek Maoist movement. It is best known for its pro-industrialisation views, as it considers industrial growth a prerequisite for the development of the working class, which is required for the socialist revolution.

Another political feature of OAKKE is its views regarding an alleged Russian conspiracy to corrupt the left and install its own world regime. They argue that Russian imperialism is today the main threat for all humanity, just like Adolf Hitler was in the 1930s and 1940s. OAKKE supports the independence of Chechnya from Russia and sees Russia as the organizer of the September 11, 2001 attacks. The party is also generally pro-Israel.

== History ==
The Organization for the Reconstruction of the Communist Party of Greece (OAKKE) is a Greek political organization of Marxist–Leninist–Maoist orientation. It was founded on July 20, 1985, by former members of EKKE–MLKKE party (EKKE was the "Revolutionary Communist Movement of Greece" and MLKKE was the "Marxist–Leninist Communist Party of Greece", both of Maoist orientation), who left the party in June of that year.

The formation of OAKKE involved the entire Party Organisation of Piraeus of EKKE–MLKKE, nearly all EKKE–MLKKE members who had belonged to EKKE before the two parties' unification in 1982 (all but two), and several other members and cadres of EKKE–MLKKE originating from the pre-1982 MLKKE in the rest of the country.

== Strategy ==
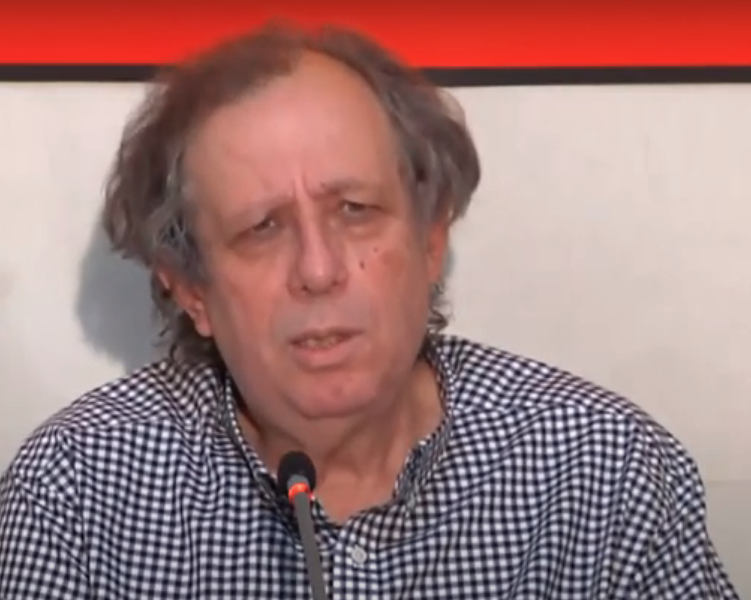
The Secretary General of the Organization for the Reconstruction of the Communist Party of Greece, Ilias Zafeiropoulos

The political strategy of OAKKE is the reconstruction of the old revolutionary Communist Party of Greece (KKE) of the period 1918-1956 (as the currently named KKE party is considered by OAKKE as a non-communist, social-fascist party), but under the new conditions and enriched with the experience the last 50 years and Maoism. The revolution in Greece, according to OAKKE, will be socialist in nature and anti-imperialist in form and will establish the political status of the dictatorship of the proletariat, while the broader front through which the proletariat would lead to broad democratic anti-fascist movement will be the Anti-Russian Democratic and Patriotic Front (ADIPAM). The basis of this analysis is the political line of the Third Communist International on the Antifascist Front and the Three Worlds Theory of the Chinese Communist Party in the 1970s. OAKKE places great emphasis in their writing to the defense of the political heritage of the Secretary of the KKE between 1931 - 1956 Nikos Zachariadis, whom he considers, in line with the contradictory information received by Russian authorities between 1973 and 1990, but mainly based on political analysis, murdered by the leaders of the CPSU. It is also the only organization in Greece nowadays, which maintains next to the forefront of its publications the five heads of Marx - Engels - Lenin - Stalin - Mao.

== Positions ==
=== Russian social imperialism ===
According to the positions of OAKKE, which describes itself as a proletarian revolutionary and anti-imperialist organization, it conducts a struggle mainly against “Russian social imperialism”, which is currently considered by it the biggest threat to world peace, as was the pre-war Nazi Germany, based, as said before, on the Maoist strategy of the three worlds. The Russian social imperialism, according to OAKKE, from 1991 on, enters a new phase because the perestroika and reform "were the most profound attempts of social-fascist Russia to become autonomous from the USSR to try from that moment onwards to coil again around her a neo-tsarist empire from the ruins of the USSR. This is the era of the "dead bug" which ends today with the creation of Russian-Chinese war axis.

=== Neo-Nazi axis (Russia, China, and Iran) ===
Furthermore, according to the positions of the organization, there is an allied axis which consists of Russia - China - Iran, under the overall guidance of the first, which is, in its essence, neo-Nazi. Despite its opposition to the expansionist policy of the most chauvinistic aspects of the Israeli bourgeoisie and its support for the struggle of the Palestinian people and to gain this right to an independent state, OAKKE, unlike all the other organizations and parties in Greece with reference to the left, defends the armed fight Israel is waging against forces such as Hamas and Hezbollah, and believes these two organizations are Islamo-Nazi and hidden arms of the neo-Nazi axis.

Generally, OAKKE supported the side of Israel in the battle that the latter gave in the summer of 2006 against Hezbollah, as OAKKE believes that antisemitism, today expressed by the request for the destruction of the state of Israel and the theory of "stateless Jewish capitalist" and "the Jewish conspiracy for world domination," will be one of the flags of the Axis in a possible global war waged against first and foremost the peoples of the world, but also against the rivals of Russia, China, and Iran, thus the western imperialists. The party denies the genocide in Gaza. It claims that there are progressive factions within Zionism, and distinguishes them from the revisionist Zionism of Netanyahu.

=== Productive sabotage ===
A key role in the analysis of the organization is played by the concept of "productive sabotage." This is defined by OAKKE as the destruction of the productive capital in Greece, through either the breaking down and closure of existing production units, often with “left” arguments (ecological, supposedly anti-capitalist, archaeological, etc.) or by preventing the investments by the local and western bourgeoisie. This attributed – by OAKKE – to the relationship of the leaders of the KKE and SYN from 1956 on, and of the prime ministers Andreas Papandreou and Costas Simitis, Kostas Karamanlis and George Papandreou with Russian social-imperialism. According to OAKKE, Andreas Papandreou, the father of the current prime minister and founder of the governing PASOK party, was one of the best Russian agents of all time.

In the OAKKE analysis, the Russians and their allies or agents in Greece do this because Russia - as an imperialist country - is economically much weaker than western imperialism, and so, whatever productive capital cannot be controlled by it, must be damaged in order to economically and politically weaken a country, so as to subdue it. Direct or indirect relations with Russian social imperialism, based on the start of their business or other information from their business process, are attributed by OAKKE to large Greek businessmen, among them Sokratis Kokkalis, George Bobolas, Panos Germanos, Andreas Vgenopoulos etc.

=== Productivism ===
A frequent criticism made by other organizations who refer to Marxism towards OAKKE is the one of "productivism," a theory which gives priority to the development of productive forces and not to the change of the relations of production, which was characteristic of the Mensheviks in the Russian social democracy before the Revolution of 1917 and a point of friction with the Bolsheviks. OAKKE, beyond its founding declaration of 1985, in which it refers critically to this Menshevik productivist theory, most recently has answered that the fight that it gives and that it calls people to give is not mainly for the development of the productive forces, but in the opposite for the breaking of the productive relations of the country's dependence from Russian social imperialism, ultimately from any imperialism as part of the revolutionary destruction of all capitalist relations of production and their replacement by revolutionary means with socialist relations, in the way for a world classless communist society.

=== Participation of Greece in the European Union ===
Finally, another difference with other leftist parties, and especially communist parties, is that OAKKE supports (since November 1995 and its 2nd Conference) the participation of Greece in the EU, on the grounds that it is a union of bourgeois states made by consensus and not with violence, that in the main the internal relations are not based on imperialist imposition of the large state to the small one but on the bourgeois democratic consensus of the 27 States, and that through this process the European proletariat is objectively released to a certain degree by the nationalism and the chauvinism of the bourgeoisie of each country. Most importantly, since 1990 and its 1st Congress, OAKKE supported – in terms of tactics – the eve of Greece in the then EEC (as opposed to the founding position of OAKKE in 1985, which was a direct exit from the EEC) with the notion that a United Europe constitutes a mound to the two superpowers, Russia and the US, especially to the Russians, who according to Mao Zedong, have as their first geo-strategic goal the military conquest of Western Europe.

In accordance to its position on the need to strengthen the political unification of Europe, left behind by economic integration, the organization was in favor of the Euro-constitution, unlike all the other organizations listed on the left.

=== Reconstruction of the world communist movement ===
On the question of reconstruction of the world communist movement, the OAKKE, condensing its position, notes that "the new revolutionary workers parties will now have a big mandate from their members and followers: Not to become the major new rulers of society and their executives and their members not to become the new exploiters.

=== KKE ===
Regarding the Communist Party of Greece (KKE), OAKKE claims that the KKE, which it calls "fake KKE," is a "party of apostates of Marxism which in 1956-58 dismantled the real revolutionary KKE on behalf of the big Russian imperialist bourgeois of a new type also apostates which with Khrushchev and Brezhnev as their leaders restored capitalism in the USSR and turned it into a fascist country of a hitlerite type."

== Election results ==
Since 1989 OAKKE has participated in all national elections and European elections. In national elections in 1996 it collaborated with the “Rainbow”. In the 2004 elections, it received 5,090 votes (0.08%). In the parliamentary elections of 2007, it received 2,473 votes(0.03%). In the 2009 European elections, it received 2,808 votes (0.05).

Since 1985, OAKKE have participated in all national elections and EU-elections. The party says that fights "against the red-brown political current", the political parties that support "Russian imperialism". In the 2004 elections for the European Parliament, OAKKE took part obtaining 5,090 votes (0.08% of the total Greek vote). OAKKE in the 1996 elections formed an alliance with the Macedonian Slavs activist party, Rainbow.

=== Hellenic Parliament ===
Election	Hellenic Parliament					Rank	Government	Leader
Election	Votes	%	±pp	Seats won	+/−	Rank	Government	Leader
1993	703	0.01%	New	0 / 300	New	18th	Extra-parliamentary	Ilias Zafeiropoulos
1996 (Note: Run in coalition with Rainbow.)	3,534	0.05%	+0.04	0 / 300	0	17th	Extra-parliamentary	Ilias Zafeiropoulos
2000	1,139	0.02%	–0.02	0 / 300	0	19th	Extra-parliamentary	Ilias Zafeiropoulos
2004	2,097	0.03%	+0.01	0 / 300	0	15th	Extra-parliamentary	Ilias Zafeiropoulos
2007	2,473	0.03%	±0.00	0 / 300	0	15th	Extra-parliamentary	Ilias Zafeiropoulos
2009	1,665	0.02%	–0.01	0 / 300	0	17th	Extra-parliamentary	Ilias Zafeiropoulos
May 2012	2,565	0.04%	+0.02	0 / 300	0	24th	Extra-parliamentary	Ilias Zafeiropoulos
Jun 2012	Did not contest			0 / 300	0	—N/a	Extra-parliamentary	Ilias Zafeiropoulos
Jan 2015	Did not contest			0 / 300	0	—N/a	Extra-parliamentary	Ilias Zafeiropoulos
Sep 2015	2,230	0.04%	±0.00	0 / 300	0	19th	Extra-parliamentary	Ilias Zafeiropoulos
2019	Did not contest			0 / 300	0	—N/a	Extra-parliamentary	Ilias Zafeiropoulos
May 2023	1,011	0.02%	–0.02	0 / 300	0	32nd	Extra-parliamentary	Ilias Zafeiropoulos
Jun 2023	1,097	0.02%	±0.00	0 / 300	0	24th	Extra-parliamentary	Ilias Zafeiropoulos

=== European Parliament ===
European Parliament
Election	Votes	%	±pp	Seats won	+/−	Rank	Leader	EP Group
1994	5,956	0.09	New	0 / 22	New	20th	Ilias Zafeiropoulos	−
1999	4,600	0.07	−0.02	0 / 22	0	24th	Ilias Zafeiropoulos	−
2004	5,090	0.08	+0.01	0 / 22	0	20th	Ilias Zafeiropoulos	−
2009	2,807	0.05	−0.03	0 / 22	0	26th	Ilias Zafeiropoulos	−
2014	2,860	0.05	±0.00	0 / 21	0	39th	Ilias Zafeiropoulos	−
2019	Did not contest			0 / 21	0	—N/a	Ilias Zafeiropoulos	−
2024	1,615	0.04	−0.01	0 / 21	0	30th	Ilias Zafeiropoulos	−

== Organizations close to OAKKE ==
OAKKE publishes its own newspaper, Nea Anatoli (in Greek "Νέα Ανατολή"). Also the leading members Elias Zafiropoulos, Anna Stae and other personalities of the Greek left founded the Non Governmental Organization, Antinazi Initiative. The Trade Union wing of OAKKE, acting mainly in the ship repair zone in Perama, is ERGAS.

Antinazi Initiative, corresponds to the British antifascist Searchlight.

It publishes the monthly newspaper "New Orient", and wall newspapers which are posted at key points in many cities across the country by its members and friends.

== See also ==
- Politics of Greece
