= Rainbow (Greece) =

Rainbow Ουράνιο Τόξο
- Leader: Collective leadership (Political Secretariat)
- Founded: 1994
- Headquarters: Stephanou Dragoumi 11, 53100, Florina, Greece
- Ideology: Macedonian minority rights Regionalism
- European affiliation: None (since 2023); European Free Alliance (pre-2023)
- Colours: Rainbow

Website
- florina.org

The Rainbow (Greek: Ουράνιο Τόξο, Ouránio Tóxo; Macedonian: Виножито, Vinožito) is a political party in Greece, and a former member of the European Free Alliance. It is known for its activism amongst what it regards as the ethnic Macedonian minority in Greece and their descendants abroad. The Rainbow states that it sees the acceptance of the Republic of North Macedonia in the European Union with a positive regard.

In the past, it had an alliance with the Organization for the Reconstruction of the Communist Party of Greece (OAKKE). The two formed a coalition in the Parliamentary elections in 1996. Members of the party retain Greek names and surnames. This is both due to bureaucratic barriers for name-changing and due to their wishing not to alienate their target electorate.

In 2005, the European Court of Human Rights found the Greek government guilty of violating the European Convention on Human Rights by restricting party members' freedom of assembly and failing to provide due process within reasonable time. The Greek government was ordered to pay 35,000 euros in compensation.

== History ==
The Rainbow party was founded in 1994, succeeding the Macedonian Movement for Balkan Prosperity. The party offices were opened in Florina on 6 September 1995. On 7 September, the offices were broken into and ransacked. A sign hanging outside the office which had clearly written on it 'ВИНОЖИТО, ΟΥΡΑΝΙΟ ΤΟΞΟ, ЛЕРИНСКИ КОМИТЕТ' (Vinožito, Ouránio Tóxo, Lerinski Komitet). This sign had words "Rainbow Party, Florina Committee" written in both Greek and Macedonian. This sign was then stolen during the raid.

The sign was replaced. However, on 12 September, priests from the Florina region called on people to join a "demonstration to protest against the enemies of Greece who arbitrarily display signs with anti-Hellenic inscriptions". The statement also called for the “deportation” of those responsible. Early in the morning of 13 September, the offices of the party were attacked by a number of people, including the mayor of Florina. They broke into the premises, assaulted those inside and confiscated the sign. During the course of the night, equipment and furniture on the premises were thrown out the window and set alight. No one was charged for the attack.

On 13 September, four leaders of the party Pavlos Voskopoulos, Petros Vasiliadis, Vasilis Romas and Costas Tasopoulos were charged with "causing and inciting mutual hatred among the citizens" under Article 192 of the Greek Penal Code. Amnesty International and Human Rights Watch called on Greek authorities to drop the charges against them. A trial was held against them in September 1998 and they were acquitted.

== Electoral results ==
Results, 1994–2019 (year links to election page)
Year	Type of Election	Votes	%	Mandates
1994	European Parliament	7,263	0.10	0
1996	Hellenic Parliament	3,485^{1}	0.05	-
1999	European Parliament	4,951	0.08	0
2004	European Parliament	6,176	0.10	0
2009	European Parliament	4,530	0.09	0
2014	European Parliament	5,759	0.10	0
2019	European Parliament	6,412	0.11	0

^{1} Participated with OAKKE in the 1996 Greek Parliament election

=== 1994 European Parliament election ===
In the June 1994 Euroelections, a Rainbow list was presented by the Macedonian Movement for Balkan Prosperity (MAKIVE), in cooperation with the Rainbow group of the European Parliament (which included the minority and regionalist MEPs between 1989–1994). The list was immediately strongly attacked and slandered by the state news agency and some media; then the country’s Supreme Court invalidated its candidacy, on the grounds that it had not declared it was not aiming at overthrowing the regime, a declaration not used since 1974. Following the outcry, the Rainbow and two other leftist lists, which were initially excluded were reinstated. The Rainbow list was the only one not to get any air time on state television during the campaign and was not able to distribute ballots in most Southern Greek electoral districts; also, on election day, GHM and MRG-Greece received reliable information that the Rainbow ballot was not given to the voters in many Greater Athens voting places. Despite all those problems, Rainbow received 7,263 votes or 0.1% of the total electorate. Its relative share of the vote was significant in three districts where it received more than half its votes: 5.7% in Florina, 1.3% in Pella, and 0.9% in Kastoria. In the October 1994 more polarized district elections, the Rainbow list in Florina received 3.5%.

=== 1999 European Parliament Election ===
Rainbow participated in the 1999 elections for the European Parliament, obtaining 4,951 votes (0.08% of the total Greek vote) and failing to elect anyone.

=== 2002 Greek local elections ===
Petros Dimtsis, a Rainbow Party member, was elected prefecture counselor in the Florina prefecture on a local list also supported by the Panhellenic Socialist Movement (PASOK), as was the case that same year and at the next elections in 2006 for the candidate of the Turkish minority's Party of Friendship, Equality and Peace, Achmet Chatziosman, elected on a local list supported by PASOK and Synaspismós in the Rhodope Prefecture. So far, he was the only member of the party ever to have been elected to any office.

=== 2004 Greek Parliament Election ===
They decided not to take part in the 2004 parliamentary elections, citing shortage of funds as the reason.

=== 2004 European Parliament Election ===
Rainbow took part in the 2004 elections, obtaining 6,176 votes (0.098%). Their best return was in the Florina prefecture, where they managed to tally 1,203 votes out of 39,532 cast, failing to elect anyone. Out of the 6,176 votes Rainbow Party received, less than half (2,955) were cast in the region of Macedonia itself. Because parties stand for election across the entire length and breadth of the country, the pro-ethnic Macedonian Rainbow Party polled better in such distant regions as Crete and the Peloponnese than it did in many Macedonian prefectures.

=== 2006 Greek local elections ===
Rainbow elected several candidates in the Florina region, including Petros Dimtsis who was reelected to the office of prefecture counselor in the Florina prefecture.

=== 2007 Greek Parliament Election ===
Rainbow chose not to participate in the 2007 Greek legislative election, again citing a shortage of funds.

=== 2009 European Parliament Election ===
In the 2009 European Parliament election, which resulted in a record low voter turnout, Rainbow tallied a countrywide total of 4,530 votes (out of over 5.25 million cast), a 0.09% percentage result, and failed to gain a seat in the European Parliament. Their best return was in the Florina prefecture, with 1,195 votes (a 0.57% increase from the 2004 elections). Votes tallied in other prefectures were mostly in the two-digit ballpark.

=== 2010 Greek local elections ===
Panayotis Anastasiadis (Pando Ashlakov), an active member of the party's leadership, was elected president of the village of Meliti/Ovchareni, but on a broader list, as for the local elections in Greece national parties are forbidden to take part, only local lists compete, usually with the support of several parties.

=== 2019 European Parliament elections ===
The Rainbow Party received a total of 6,413 votes in the 2019 European Parliament election in Greece. The party performed best in Florina where it received 3.3% (1,123 votes) of the vote, finishing sixth among the parties.

== Political programme and reception ==
The Rainbow Party is interested in achieving political recognition of what they regard as an ethnic Macedonian minority in Greece, and preserving its culture, language, and customs. Greece officially recognizes the party but not the ethnic group due to the existence of their own regional group also named Macedonians, their own historical association with ancient Macedonians and concerns of irredentism on behalf of the Republic of Macedonia (now North Macedonia). This issue was subject to a naming dispute mediated by the United Nations, resolved in 2019.

An issue very important to the party is the reestablishment back to Greece of the former ELAS and Democratic Army of Greece partisans expelled during the Greek Civil War from Macedonia (Greece). During the Greek Civil War (1944–1949), many of them took refuge in parts of the former Socialist Federal Republic of Yugoslavia (particularly the Socialist Republic of Macedonia), under the protection of the Yugoslav leader Josip Broz Tito. When PASOK was elected for the first time, they allowed all Greek communist refugees, located in many communist states, to return to Greece. However, the refugees now living in the Republic of North Macedonia were never re-granted their citizenship. In Bulgaria, historians such as Tsanko Serafimov connect the establishment of the party and the spread of Macedonian nationalism in the Greek region of Macedonia as a whole to a large extent with the disinterest of the Bulgarian state for the rights of the residents with Bulgarian identity in the area after 1944; at the same time, Yugoslavia was conducting intensified propaganda.

== See also ==
- Politics of Greece
- Slavic speakers of Greek Macedonia
