= Konstantina Kouneva =

Greek politician and trade unionist

- Κωνσταντίνα Κούνεβα
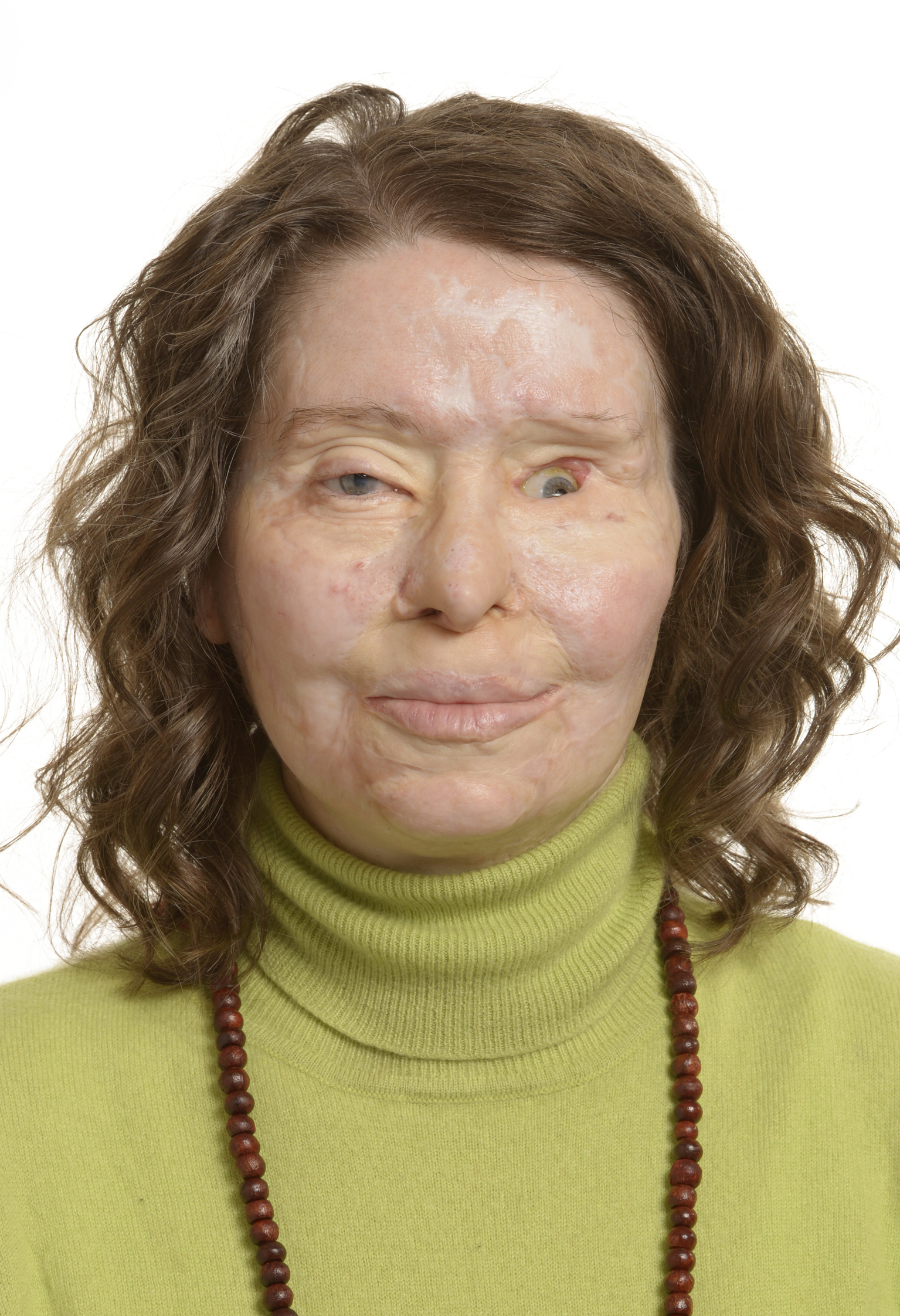

Member of the European Parliament
- In office 25 May 2014 – 2 July 2019

Personal details
- Born: 28 September 1964 (age 62) Silistra, Bulgaria
- Party: SYRIZA
- Children: 1
- Education: St. Cyril and St. Methodius University of Veliko Tarnovo

Konstantina Kouneva (Greek: Κωνσταντίνα Κούνεβα, born 28 September 1964), also known as Kostadinka Kuneva (Bulgarian: Костадинка Кунева), is a Bulgarian-born Greek politician, trade unionist and secretary of the Greek Trade Union of Cleaners and Housekeepers. She was elected as an MEP in the 2014 European Parliament elections.

== Attack and reactions ==
Kouneva was working as a cleaner for the IKOMET company (providing services to the Athens–Piraeus Electric Railways, among other clients, through outsourcing). On the night of 23 December 2008, while on her way home from work, she was attacked by unknown assailants with sulfuric acid, leaving her face disfigured, and resulting in the loss of sight in one of her eyes. She was also reportedly forced to swallow a portion of the acid, which destroyed her esophagus and heavily damaged other internal organs. This event sparked protests and clashes with the Greek police during the 2008 civil unrest in Greece.

The protests, which included banners reading "Konstandinka, you're not alone", continued at least until 22 January 2009 and numbered 3,000 people, with tear gas being used by the Monades Apokatastasis Taksis (MAT) police forces.

The attack was described as the most severe assault on a trade unionist in Greece in 50 years.

== Education ==
Kouneva graduated from the St. Cyril and St. Methodius University of Veliko Tarnovo with a degree in History.

== Politics ==
She was elected to the European Parliament as a candidate of the left-wing SYRIZA party in the European Parliament election held on 25 May 2014.
