= Konstantinos Papadakis (politician) =

Greek politician (born 1975)

- Κωνσταντίνος Παπαδάκης
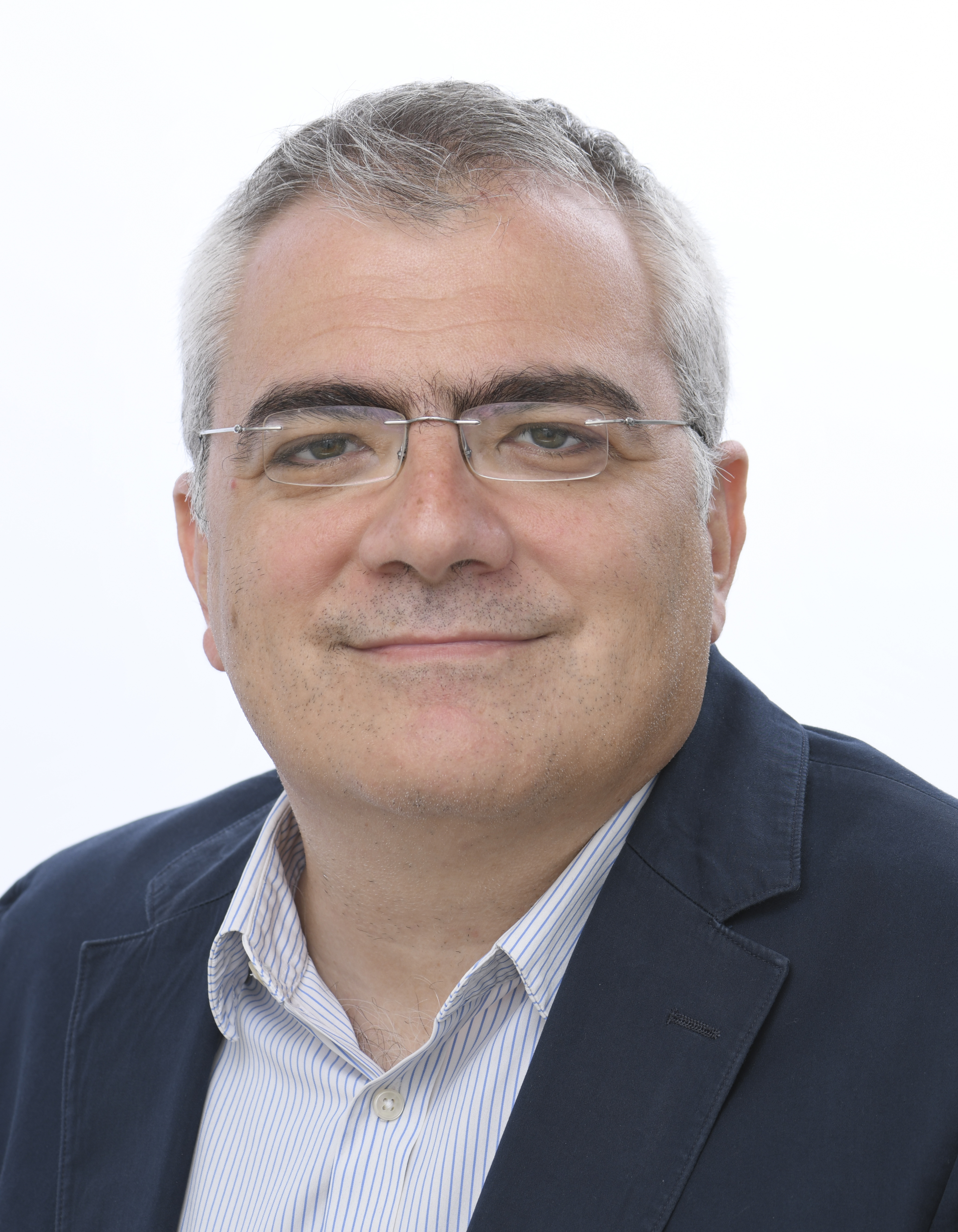

Member of the European Parliament for Greece
- Incumbent
- Assumed office 1 July 2014

Personal details
- Born: April 18, 1975 (age 51) Athens, Greece
- Party: Communist Party of Greece (KKE)

Konstantinos Papadakis (Greek: Κωνσταντίνος Παπαδάκης; born 18 April 1975 in Athens) is Greek politician. In 2014, he was elected to the European Parliament to represent the Communist Party of Greece.

== Member of the European Parliament ==
In the 2014 European Parliament election, he was elected one of two MEPs on the list of the Communist Party of Greece (KKE). He is non-inscrit, not affiliating with any parliamentary group. He is however member of the Committee on Regional Development, of the Delegation for relations with the Palestinian Legislative Council and of the Delegation to the Parliamentary Assembly of the Union for the Mediterranean.

On 2 March 2022, he was one of 13 MEPs who voted against condemning the Russian invasion of Ukraine.

On 15 September 2022, he was one of 16 MEPs who voted against condemning President Daniel Ortega of Nicaragua for human rights violations, in particular the arrest of Bishop Rolando Álvarez.
