= Pavlos Voskopoulos =

Greek politician (born 1964)

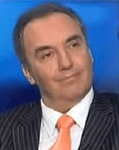
- Born: 25 November 1964 (age 61); Florina, Greece
- Education: B.A in Architecture
- Occupations: Architect, politician
- Political party: Rainbow party

Pavlos Voskopoulos (Greek: Παύλος Βοσκόπουλος; born 25 November 1964) also known as Pavle Voskopulos (Macedonian: Павле Воскопулос) is a Greek politician, a member of the collective leadership of the Rainbow party that represents the Slavic–speaking minority (identifying as ethnic Macedonian) in Greek Macedonia.

== Biography ==
Voskopoulos, an ethnic Macedonian, was born in 1964 in Florina, Greece, to a Macedonian–speaking family. His grandmother spoke no Greek. He uses the Slavic patronymic Filipov (Филипов), his family's traditional name, which was changed to Voskopoulos (his application to change back was rejected by the Greek government). The Mayor of Florina, Ioannis Voskopoulos is his cousin.

Voskopoulos has a B.A in Architecture and is an architect. He participated in Greek local elections in 1993 representing the organisation MAKIVE (Macedonian Movement for Balkan Prosperity) and secured 14 percent of the vote.

Voskopoulos was a founder of the Rainbow Party, a political party in Greece representing the Macedonian minority. He has been one of its leading figures. The party opened its first office in the Greek city of Florina on 6 September 1995. On 14 September he, along with three other members of the Rainbow Party were charged with "having caused and incited mutual hatred among the citizens" by the local Florina court. Soon organisations such as Amnesty International came to the support of the members of the Rainbow Party, claiming that they would become "prisoners of conscience" if they were to be jailed for the offence.

Voskopoulos has sought recognition for the Rainbow Party and Macedonian minority. He has said the party seeks minority rights for Greek citizens and opposes intervention from North Macedonia or other countries. Voskopoulos has stated the policies of 21st century Greece lack the recognition of "otherness" within the national myth of homogeneity. In appearances on Greek TV, he has used the Macedonian language phrase of the Rainbow Party Gore Glavata (keep your head up) in reference to Macedonian socio–cultural affirmation.
