= Kostas Chrysogonos =

Kostas Chrysogonos MEP
- Κώστας Χρυσόγονος
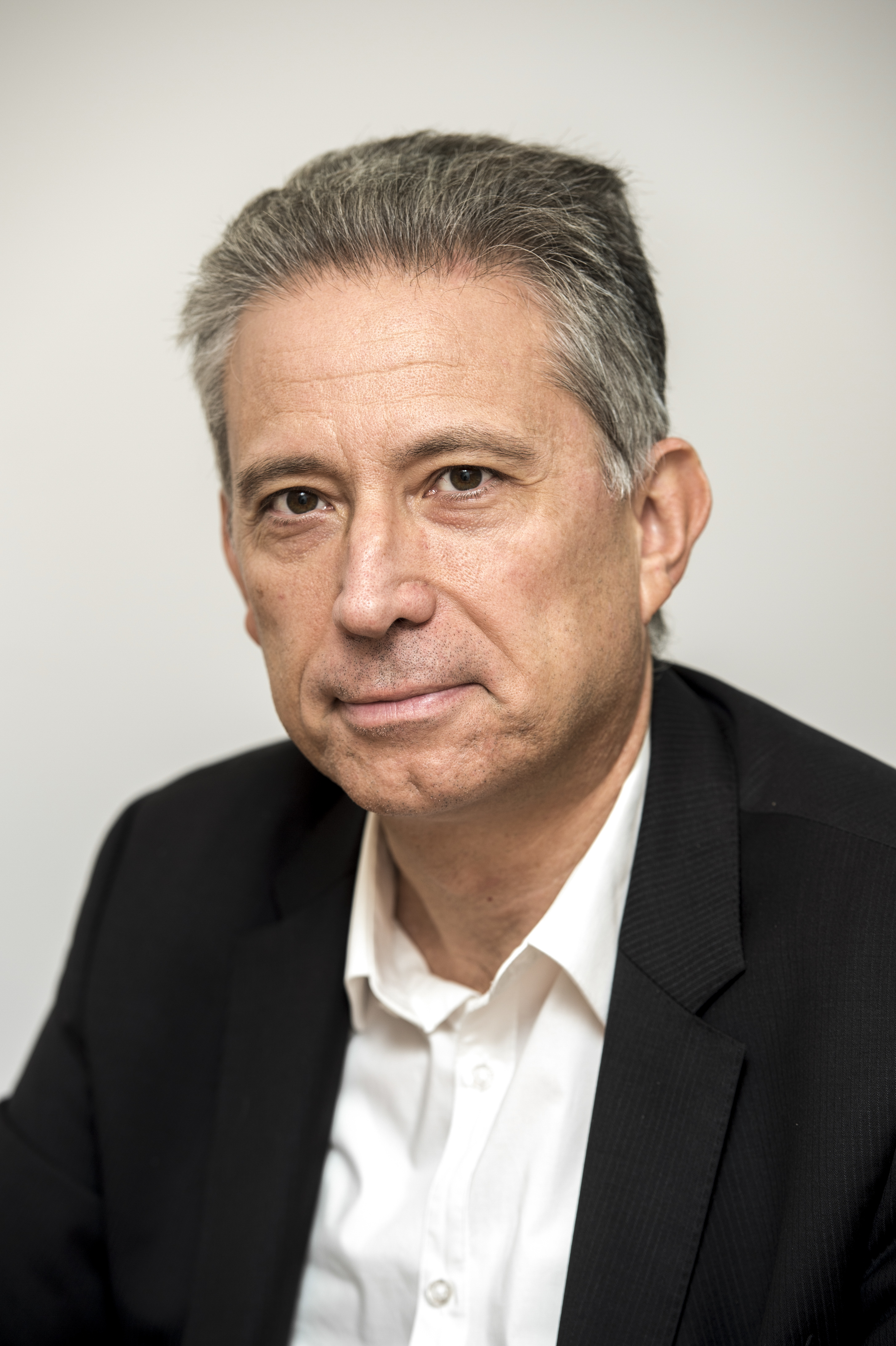

Member of the European Parliament for Greece
- In office 1 July 2014 – 2 July 2019

Personal details
- Born: 27 June 1961 (age 65) Serres, Greece
- Party: Independent (2017–present); previously Syriza
- Spouse: Amalia Milona (m.2007-) Marianna Koudeli (m.1999-d.2002)
- Children: Evangelia, Chariklia, Dimitrios
- Education: Aristotle University of Thessaloniki, Leibniz University Hannover
- Profession: Constitutional law professor

Kostas Chrysogonos (born 7 June 1961) is a Greek professor of constitutional law and a former Member of the European Parliament, sitting as an independent within the group of the European United Left–Nordic Green Left (GUE/NGL).

== Education ==
He studied law at the Aristotle University of Thessaloniki. He graduated in 1983 with a Bachelor distinction (9.90/10). He earned his PhD in 1987 from Leibniz University Hannover, Germany with honours (magna cum laude). He was accepted into Harvard Law School but last minute decided not to attend for personal reasons.

== Academic career ==
In 1990 he was appointed Lecturer of the Law Faculty of the Aristotle University of Thessaloniki, in 1993 he became Assistant Professor. In 1999 he became Associate Professor and in 2003 Full Professor with a specialisation in Constitutional Law. He delivered lectures in Constitutional Law for years at the National Academy of Judges and the Hellenic Open University and as a Visiting Professor at the University of Regensburg and Leibniz University Hannover respectively. He has published 16 books, including the handbooks Constitutional Law and Private and Social Rights, which are used in Greek universities for teaching purposes, and more than 100 research papers in legal journals and edited books in Greek, English and German.

== Politics ==
Kostas Chrysogonos joined forces with the Greek Coalition of the Radical Left (SYRIZA) and ran for a European Parliament seat in 2014 European elections. In the aftermath of his first campaign he managed to seal the 6th position of the group of MEPs to represent SYRIZA at the European Parliament ahead of prominent figures. He has tabled many written questions, declarations, amendments to resolutions and reports; he also organized several events. As a Member of the European Parliament he is a Vice-President of the Committee on Development (DEVE), full member of the Committee on Legal Affairs (JURI) and member of the Committee on Civil Liberties, Justice and Home Affairs (LIBE). He is also a member of the Delegation to the EU-Turkey Joint Parliamentary Committee and a substitute member of the Delegation to the CARIFORUM — EU Parliamentary Committee as well as the USA — EU Parliamentary Committee.
