= Lampros Fountoulis =

Greek politician

Lampros Fountoulis MEP
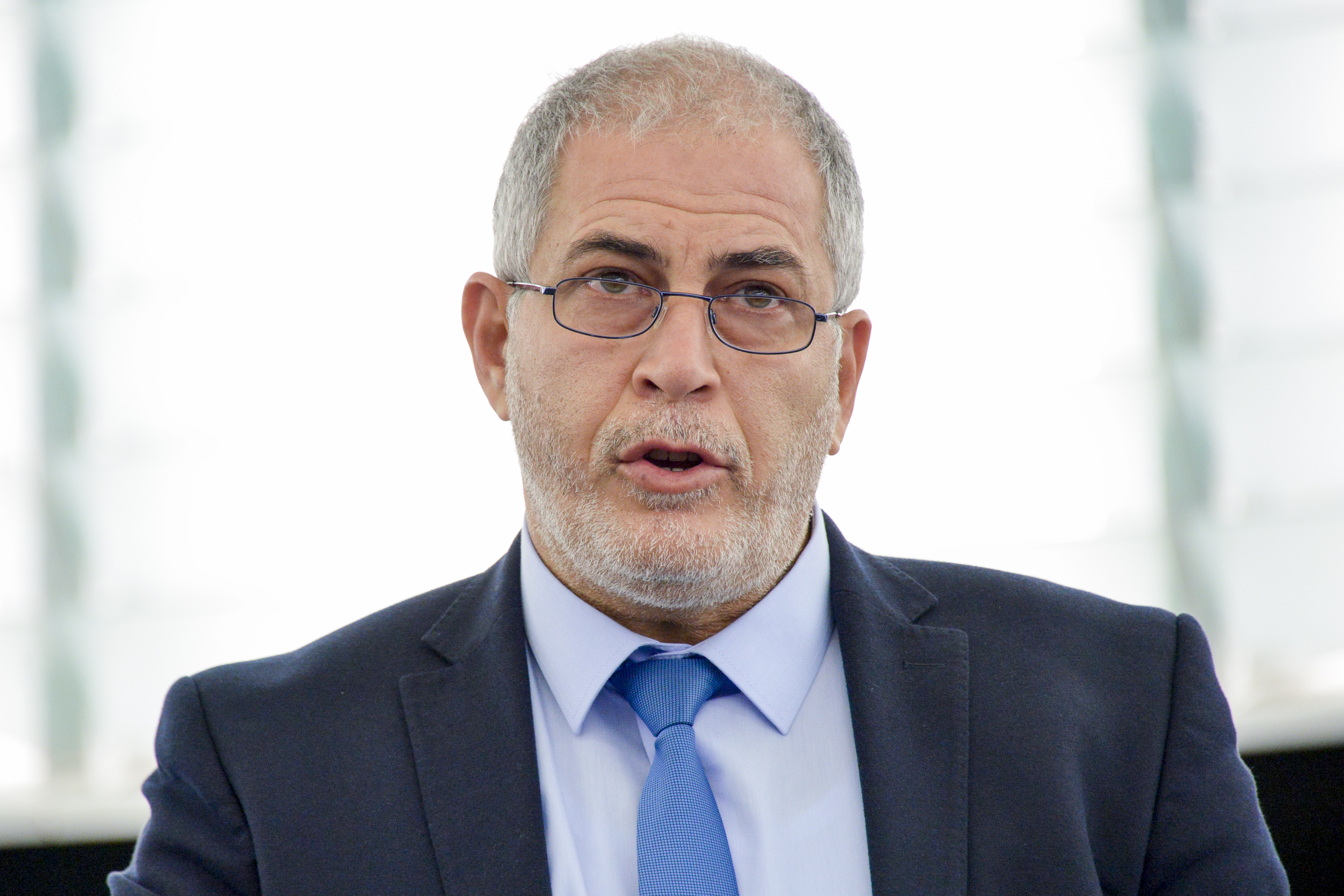

Member of the European Parliament for Greece
- In office 2014–2019

Personal details
- Born: 23 January 1961 (age 65)
- Party: Golden Dawn

Lampros Fountoulis (Greek: Λάμπρος Φουντούλης; born 23 January 1961) is a Greek politician, representing the far right Golden Dawn party. He was a Member of the European Parliament (MEP) from Greece from 2014 until 2019.
