= Hellenic Front =

Hellenic Front Ελληνικό Μέτωπο Elliniko Metopo
- Founder: Makis Voridis
- Founded: April 1994
- Dissolved: 15 May 2005
- Merged into: LAOS
- Ideology: Greek ultranationalism Anti-communism; National conservatism
- Political position: Far-right

Website
- metopo.gr (archived)

The Hellenic Front (Greek: Ελληνικό Μέτωπο) was a Greek political party with an ultranationalist platform, founded in 1994. Its declared raison d'être was to raise national conscience and inspire freedom, creativity, and development by reversing what it sees as dependence on foreign economies and ideas. It advocated creation of a “National Opposition Front” to build an effective and credible alternative to the current two-party system. On social matters, the party has supported populist policies such as the re-introduction of the death penalty (long abolished in Greece), specifically as a sentence for drug dealers. Makis Voridis, a lawyer, and former General Secretary of the EPEN youth, was the President of the Hellenic Front.

On the EU level, the party cooperated with other European Far-right forces, such as the National Rally, the Flemish Block, and the National Front.

== Results in the elections ==
In local elections held in 1998, Voridis stood as a candidate for Mayor of Athens, receiving 0.58% of the vote. The party carried 0.12% of the vote in the European elections of 1999; 0.18% of the vote in the parliamentary election of 2000; and an average of 1.4% in local elections in 2002 (0.9% in Athens, 1.2% in Piraeus, 1.2% in Thessaloniki, 4.5% in Karditsa, and 2.2% in East Attica). At the parliamentary election in 2004, the Hellenic Front received 0.09% of the vote, a result which led to the end of the party.

== The end of the Hellenic Front ==
After unsuccessfully contesting seats in the 2004 elections, they eventually merged with the Popular Orthodox Rally.
