= 2004 Greek parliamentary election =

- 7 March 2004

All 300 seats in the Hellenic Parliament 151 seats needed for a majority

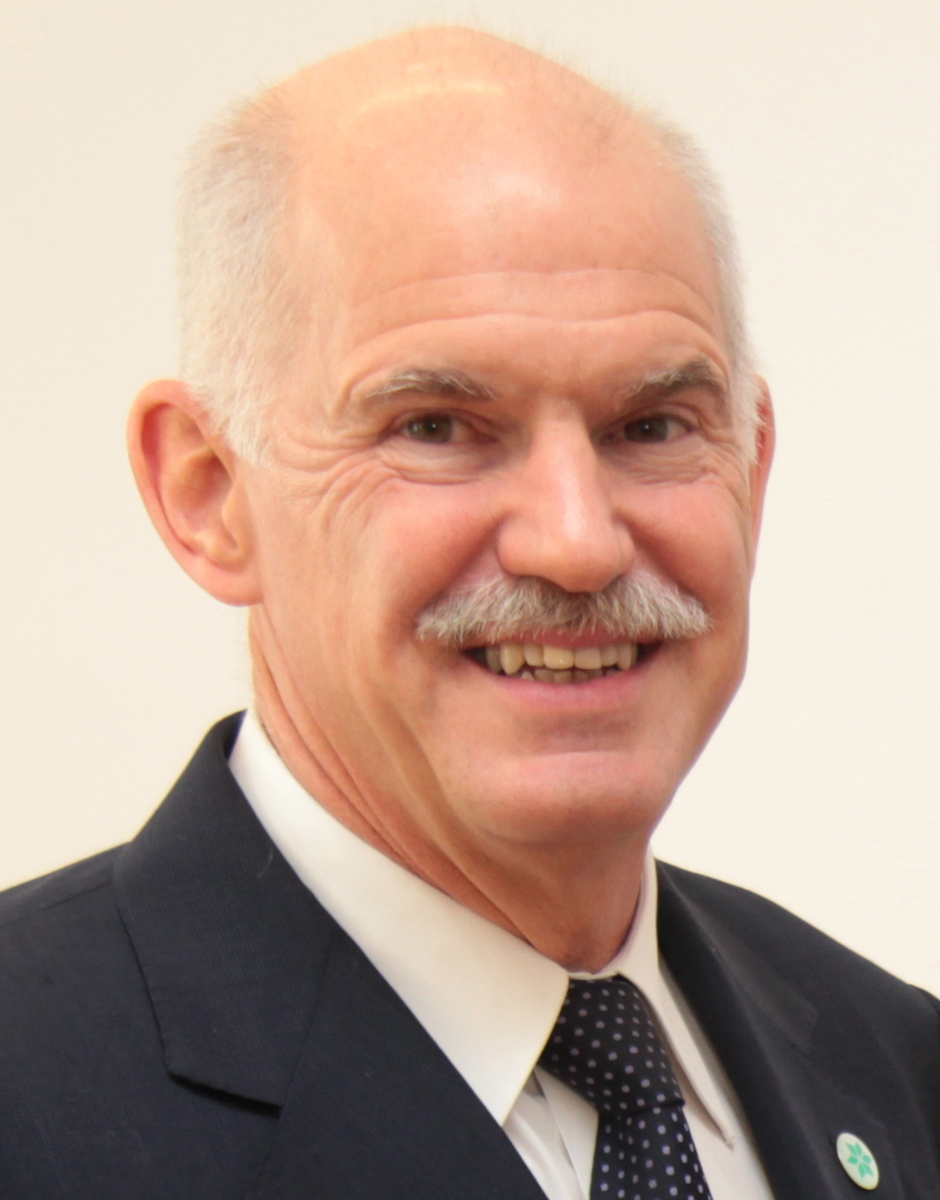

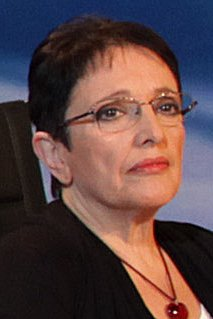

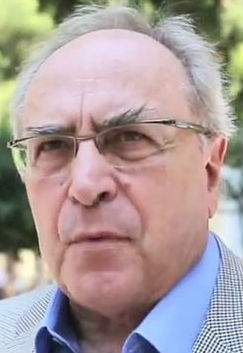
	First party	Second party
Leader	Kostas Karamanlis	George Papandreou
Party	ND	PASOK
Last election	42.73%, 125 seats	43.80%, 158 seats
Seats won	165	117
Seat change	▲40	▼41
Popular vote	3,359,682	3,003,275
Percentage	45.36%	40.55%
Swing	▲2.63pp	▼3.25pp
	Third party	Fourth party
Leader	Aleka Papariga	Nikos Konstantopoulos
Party	KKE	Syriza
Last election	5.52%, 11 seats	3.20%, 6 seats
Seats won	12	6
Seat change	▲1	Steady
Popular vote	436,573	241,539
Percentage	5.90%	3.26%
Swing	▲0.38pp	▲0.06pp
- Results by constituency
Prime Minister before election
Costas Simitis
PASOK
Prime Minister after election
Kostas Karamanlis
ND

Parliamentary elections were held in Greece on 7 March 2004. The New Democracy Party of Kostas Karamanlis won the elections, ending eleven years of rule by PASOK. PASOK was led into the elections by George Papandreou, who succeeded retiring Prime Minister Costas Simitis as party leader in February.

== Background ==
Greek politics were strongly dynastic. Kostas Karamanlis is the nephew of Konstantinos Karamanlis, who was six times (1955, 1956, 1958, 1961, 1974, 1977) Prime Minister and twice President of Greece (1980–1985, 1990–1995), and the founder of New Democracy after the restoration of democracy in 1974. George Papandreou is the son of Andreas Papandreou, three times (1981, 1985, 1993) Prime Minister and the founder of PASOK, and the grandson of Georgios Papandreou, a liberal centrist who entered national politics in the 1920s and was twice Prime Minister (1944, 1963). Athens daily Kathimerini quoted a voter during the campaign as saying: "We Greeks like to know where our leaders come from. We feel we know these families as well as we know our own."

== Campaign ==
In January New Democracy was leading PASOK in opinion polls by 7%. But Papandreou's election to the party leadership allowed PASOK to regain ground. During February Papandreou campaigned on "the need for change" in Greece, hoping to neutralise the strong sentiment for a change of government. By late February New Democracy's lead in the opinion polls had been cut to 3%.

The Athens daily Kathemerini commented: "Now, two weeks before the elections, all opinion polls show PASOK 3 to 4.5 percentage points behind ND. This raises the question of whether PASOK can snatch victory away from ND. The fact is that much is unclear. For example, although PASOK has little support, its leader has a good image in public opinion polls."

The electoral campaign concluded on in the traditional manner, with huge televised mass rallies in the centre of Athens by each of the major parties. On the evening of 4 March Karamanlis addressed an estimated 200,000 at the ND's concluding rally. PASOK claimed that twice that number attended their rally on 6 March, but these numbers cannot be independently verified. At the ND rally, Karamanlis said that PASOK had been in power too long and had grown lazy and corrupt. At the PASOK rally, Papandreou evoked the memory of his father but said that he would lead a government dedicated to reform and change, as well as action against corruption.

Since publication of opinion polls is banned in the last two weeks of Greek election campaigns, it was not possible to predict the outcome of the election, except to say that ND appeared to have been leading when the last polls were published, and that most commentators expected the result in terms of votes to be close. Greek electoral law ensures, through a complex algorithm of parliamentary seat redistribution, that a party polling a plurality of the vote (that is, more than any other party but also more than 40%) is practically guaranteed a majority in Parliament.

A "threshold" of 3% of the total popular vote is also required by law for a party to be eligible for representation in Parliament. This provision kept all but the four top-polling parties from securing parliamentary seats.

== Results ==
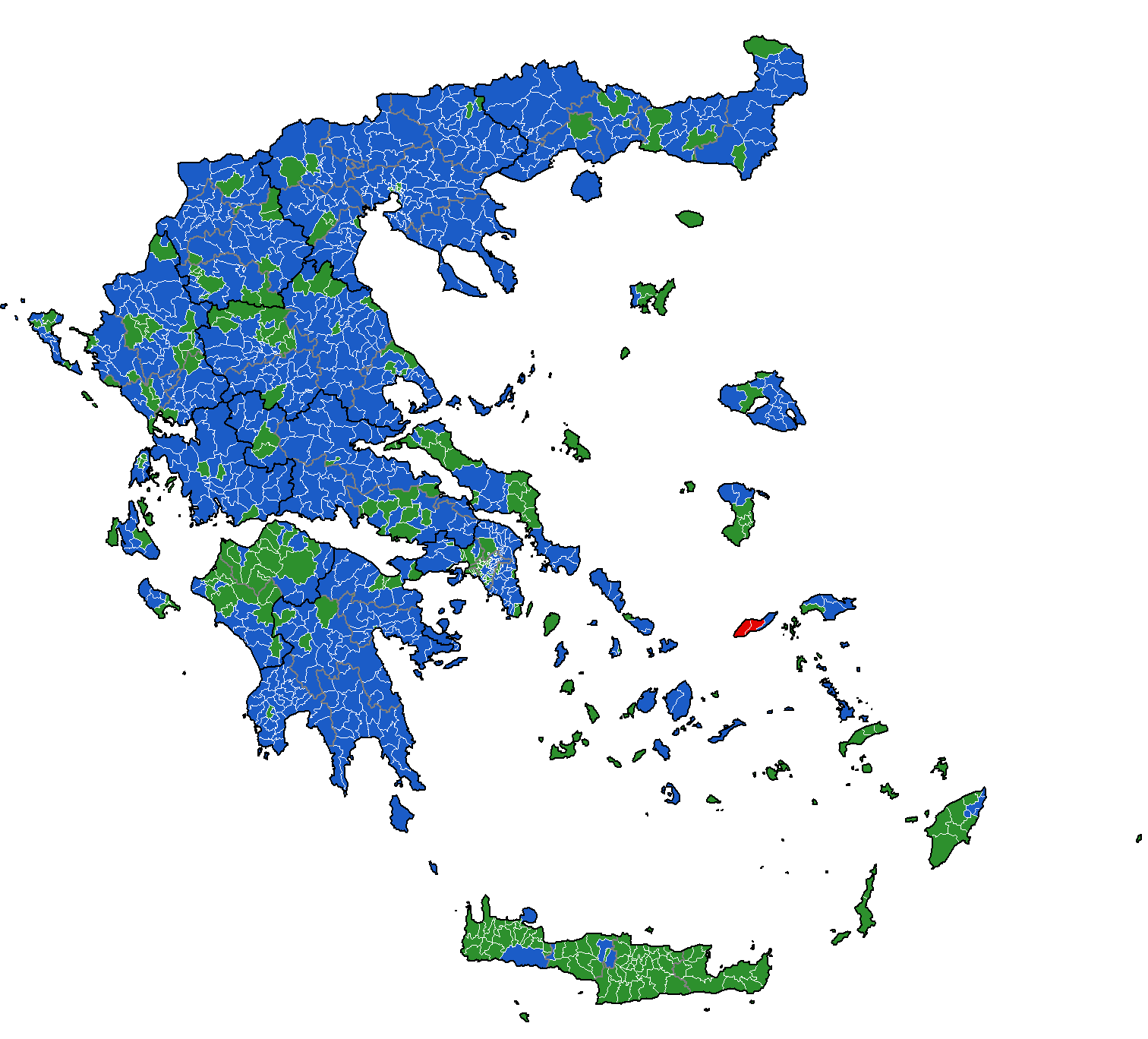
Results, showing the winning party in each municipal unit. ND (711) PASOK (311) KKE (2)

The result of the election was not as close as observers expected. It appears that ND regained its earlier lead over PASOK in the two weeks after the last opinion polls, and that the election of George Papandreou as PASOK leader was not sufficient to overcome the desire of the electorate for a change after a long period of PASOK rule.

Party	Votes	%	Seats	+/–
New Democracy	3,360,424	45.36	165	+40
PASOK	3,003,988	40.55	117	–41
Communist Party of Greece	436,818	5.90	12	+1
Syriza	241,714	3.26	6	0
Popular Orthodox Rally	162,492	2.19	0	New
Democratic Social Movement	132,933	1.79	0	0
Union of Centrists	19,510	0.26	0	0
Radical Left Front	11,285	0.15	0	0
Communist Party of Greece (Marxist–Leninist)	10,864	0.15	0	0
Anti-Capitalist Coalition	8,320	0.11	0	New
Hellenic Front	6,762	0.09	0	New
Marxist–Leninist Communist Party of Greece	4,765	0.06	0	New
Fighting Socialist Party of Greece	3,175	0.04	0	0
Liberal Party	2,619	0.04	0	0
Organization for the Reconstruction of the KKE	2,097	0.03	0	0
Christopistía	3	0.00	0	0
Independents	605	0.01	0	0
Total	7,408,374	100.00	300	0
Valid votes	7,408,374	97.80		
Invalid/blank votes	166,816	2.20		
Total votes	7,575,190	100.00		
Registered voters/turnout	9,886,807	76.62		
Source: Nohlen & Stöver
