= Fighting Socialist Party of Greece =

Socialist political party in Greece

Fighting Socialist Party of Greece Αγωνιστικό Σοσιαλιστικό Κόμμα Ελλάδας Agonistikó Sosialistikó Kómma Elládas
- Leader: Nikos Kargopoulos
- Founded: February 1984
- Newspaper: ASKE
- Ideology: Democratic socialism Left-wing nationalism
- Political position: Left-wing

Website
- aske.gr

The Fighting Socialist Party of Greece or ASKE (Greek: Αγωνιστικό Σοσιαλιστικό Κόμμα Ελλάδας, romanized: Agonistikó Sosialistikó Kómma Elládas, ΑΣΚΕ) is a left-wing Greek political party founded in February 1984.

The main core of its founding cadres consisted of members of the organisation committee of PASOK, who immediately after the Greek parliamentary elections in 1981, after which PASOK came to power, protested against it for the violation of its founding proclamations and resigned from their party posts. This opposition was expressed with Nikos Kargopoulos's opposite proposal to the PASOK Central Committee in the summer of 1983 and led to their expulsion from PASOK.

Along with other elements who came from the broader left-wing and progressive movement, they founded the Social Movement, which finally became ASKE in February 1984. Its fundamental views are the struggle for independence from foreign (non-Greek) power blocs, such as the EU and NATO), and for socialism, which the party argues must rely on self-management, the complete respect of personal and political rights, and democracy.

ASKE publishes a newspaper every two months.

In the 2004 European parliament election, ASKE gathered 11,598 votes which is its best result since its foundation.
