= Achaea (constituency) =

Parliamentary constituency of Greece

- Constituency for the Hellenic Parliament
- Location within Greece
- Region: West Greece
- Electorate: 278,236 (May 2012)

Current constituency
- Number of members: Eight

Achaea is a constituency of the Hellenic Parliament. It corresponds to Achaea Prefecture and elects eight members of parliament. The members of the prominent Papandreou politician family (Georgios Papandreou, Andreas Papandreou, George Papandreou) come from this constituency.

== Election Results ==
=== Parliamentary ===
2000

2004

2007

2009

5/2012

6/2012

1/2015

9/2015

2019

5/2023

6/2023

=== European ===
2009

2014

2024

== Members of Parliament ==
=== Current members ===
- Christina Alexopoulou (New Democracy)
- Andreas Katsaniotis (New Democracy)
- Jason Fotilas (New Democracy)
- Sia Anagnostopoulou (SYRIZA)
- Andreas Panagiotopoulos (SYRIZA)
- George Papandreou (PASOK)
- Nikolaos Karathanasopoulos (Communist Party of Greece)
- Georgios Aspiotis (Spartans)
- Spyros Tsironis (Victory)

=== Members elected in 2019 ===
- Sia Anagnostopoulou (SYRIZA)
- Andreas Rizoulis (SYRIZA)
- Kostas Spartinos (SYRIZA)
- Andreas Katsaniotis (New Democracy)
- Fotini Gennimata (PASOK)
- Nikos Nikolopoulos (Independent Greeks)
- Nikolaos Karathanasopoulos (Communist Party of Greece)
- Iason Fotilas (The River)

=== Older members (January 2015 – September 2015) ===
- Sia Anagnostopoulou (SYRIZA)
- Vasileios Chatzilamprou (SYRIZA)
- Maria Kanellopoulou (SYRIZA)
- Andreas Katsaniotis (New Democracy)
- Nikos Nikolopoulos (Independent Greeks)
- Nikolaos Karathanasopoulos (Communist Party of Greece)
- Iason Fotilas (The River)
- Michail Arvanitis-Avramis (Golden Dawn)
