= Christina Alexopoulou =

Greek politician (born 1978)

- Χριστίνα Αλεξοπούλου

Deputy Minister for Transport
- In office 27 June 2023 – 14 June 2024
- Prime Minister: Kyriakos Mitsotakis
- Succeeded by: Vasilis Oikonomou

Member of the Hellenic Parliament
- Incumbent
- Assumed office 7 July 2019
- Constituency: Achaea

Personal details
- Born: 9 October 1978 (age 48) Thessaloniki, Greece
- Party: New Democracy
- Spouse: Theodoros Tzamaloukas
- Children: 1
- Education: University of Patras
- Occupation: Civil engineer, politician

Christina Alexopoulou (Greek: Χριστίνα Αλεξοπούλου; born 9 October 1978) is a Greek politician and civil engineer who has represented Achaea in the Hellenic Parliament for New Democracy since 2019. She served as Deputy Minister for Transport from 2023 to 2024.

== Early life and career ==
Alexopoulou was born in Thessaloniki in October 1978 and grew up in Patras. She graduated from the 7th General Lyceum of Patras in 1996. She studied civil engineering at the University of Patras, graduating in 2004.

During her university years, she became involved in political and social activities as a member of the Youth Organisation of New Democracy (ONNED) and DAP-NDFK, the student organisation affiliated with New Democracy, in Patras. She served as president of ONNED Achaea from 2004 to 2010 and was also an elected member of ONNED's Central Committee.

From 2004 until her election to Parliament in 2019, Alexopoulou worked as a civil engineer and maintained an engineering practice in Patras. She has also been the owner of the construction and roadworks company Asfaltiki Patron. As a member of the Technical Chamber of Greece, she held several positions at both regional and national level.

In the 2006 prefectural elections, she was elected as a prefectural councillor in Achaea, receiving the highest number of votes among the candidates on her electoral list. She remained in the position until 2010.

== Political career ==
In the 2019 Greek legislative election, Alexopoulou was elected to the Hellenic Parliament for Achaea with New Democracy, finishing fourth among the elected candidates with 11,621 preference votes.

She was re-elected in the May 2023 Greek legislative election, finishing first in preference votes in the Achaea constituency with 25,569 votes, and again in the June 2023 Greek legislative election.

On 27 June 2023, Prime Minister Kyriakos Mitsotakis appointed her Deputy Minister of Infrastructure and Transport, with responsibility for transport matters. She remained in office until 14 June 2024.

== Controversies ==
=== Position on abortion ===
In 2019, Alexopoulou commented on social media on the decision of the Holy Synod of the Church of Greece to establish a day dedicated to the "unborn child". Following her appointment as deputy minister in June 2023, Syriza criticised her appointment, alleging that she had taken a position against abortion and women's bodily autonomy.

Syriza MP Elena Akrita also questioned whether the prime minister was aware of the newly appointed deputy minister's views. Alexopoulou responded that the content of a personal social-media post she had made in 2019 had been misrepresented.

=== Porsche incident in Lesbos ===
In June 2024, while serving as Deputy Minister for Transport, Alexopoulou attracted media attention after she was photographed travelling in a Porsche in Mytilene, while police vehicles followed behind.

Alexopoulou said that her official vehicle had been delayed and that a representative of the local KTEL bus operator had offered to transport her in the car. She stated that she travelled in it for approximately 150 metres, that she had not previously known either the make or the value of the vehicle, and described the incident as a "set-up".

=== Remarks on teachers' housing costs ===
In early February 2026, Alexopoulou's remarks during the Mega television programme Talk prompted political criticism during a discussion about the high cost of housing for teachers serving on Greek islands. When presented with the example of a teacher earning approximately €800 per month and paying €400 in rent, Alexopoulou noted that the government reimbursed the equivalent of two months' rent and then said that "freebies are dead" (Greek: το τζάμπα πέθανε), adding that "there is no such thing as free" and asking who would pay for additional benefits.

During the same discussion, when responding to the possibility of greater government support, she also used the phrase "so that she can buy a little cardigan" (Greek: για να πάρει ζακετούλα), which generated further criticism.

The remarks drew criticism from PASOK, Syriza and New Left. Government spokesman Pavlos Marinakis said that the remark had not been directed at citizens but at the opposition parties' spending promises, while acknowledging that it might not have been phrased appropriately.

Prime Minister Kyriakos Mitsotakis, when asked about the incident, said that it did not help "at all" for an MP to use such expressions and that politicians needed to be careful about the way they spoke.

Alexopoulou subsequently described her wording as "very poor" and "problematic" and apologised if she had offended public sentiment. She clarified that she had not been referring to teachers or citizens facing financial difficulties, but to what she described as the opposition's practice of making promises without explaining how they would be funded.

== See also ==
- List of members of the Hellenic Parliament, 2019
- List of members of the Hellenic Parliament, June 2023
