= Andreas Katsaniotis =

Greek politician (born 1969)

Andreas Katsaniotis Ανδρέας Κατσανιώτης
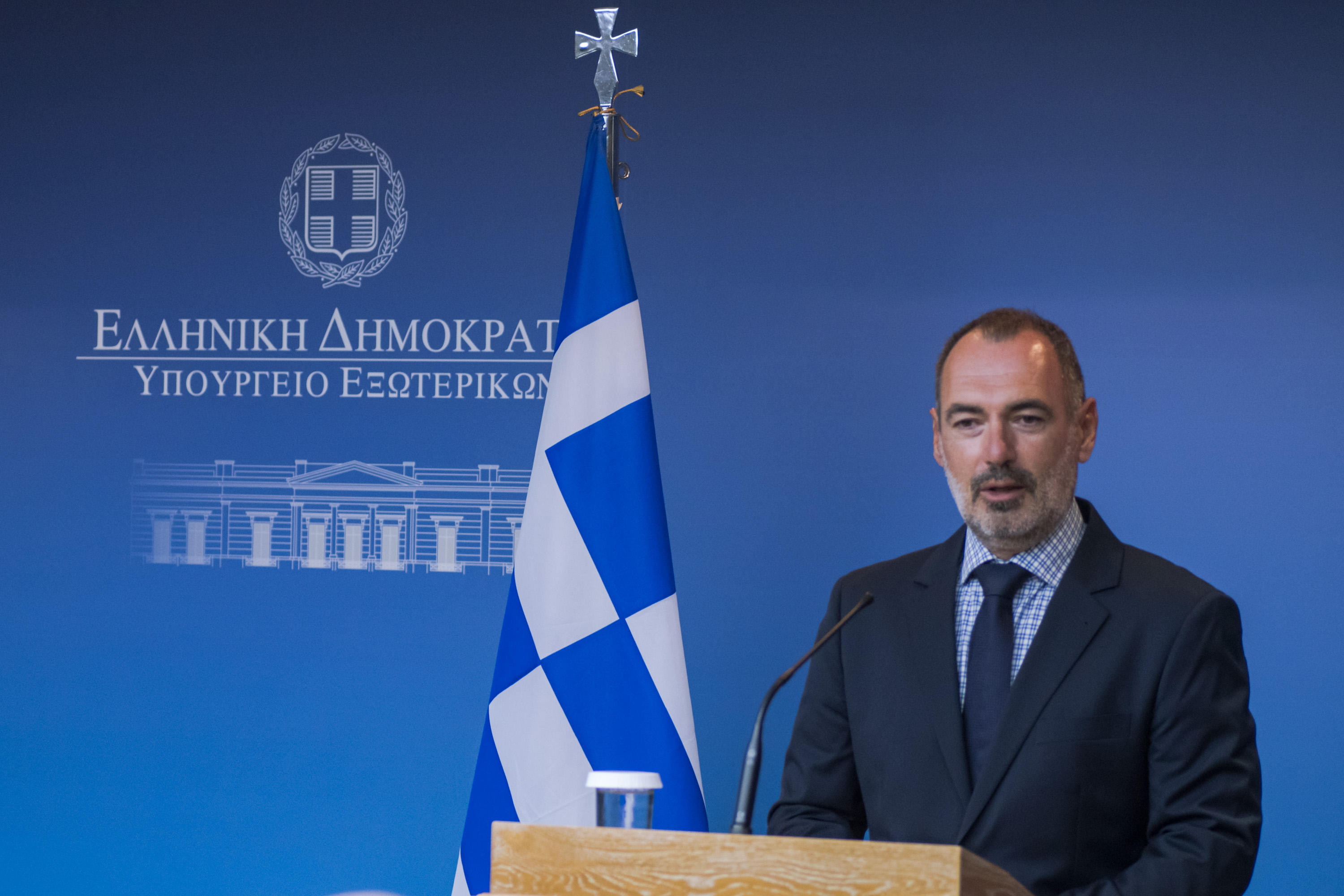

Deputy Minister for Greeks Abroad
- In office 31 August 2021 – 25 May 2023
- Prime Minister: Kyriakos Mitsotakis
- Preceded by: Konstantinos Vlassis

MP for Achaea
- Incumbent
- Assumed office 2015

Personal details
- Born: 28 November 1969 (age 56) Lappa, Achaea, Greece
- Party: New Democracy
- Education: Agricultural University of Athens
- Website: andreaskatsaniotis.gr

Andreas Katsaniotis (Greek: Ανδρέας Κατσανιώτης; born 28 November 1969) is a Greek agronomist, communication specialist and politician of the conservative New Democracy party. He is a Member of the Hellenic Parliament for Achaea and Deputy Minister of Foreign Affairs, in charge of Diaspora Greeks.

== Early life and education ==
Andreas Katsaniotis was born on 28 November 1969, in Lappa of Achaea and was raised in the city of Patras.

He is a graduate of the Department of Natural Resources Development and Agricultural Engineering of the Agricultural University of Athens.

From 1999 to 2004 he worked as a manager in several new technology companies. He was also appointed later as CEO and then Marketing and Public Relations Director of the newspaper "Kathimerini", in charge of the promotion strategy and the development of international cooperation. From 2007 to 2009 he was the managing director of the Hellenic Export Promotion Organization. Subsequently, he established his own communication consulting company for media, "ASAP".

== Political career ==
From 2012 to 2014 he served as the Secretary General of Information and Communication, in charge of Public Diplomacy and the coordination of the promotion of the image and communication strategy of Greece, domestically, but mainly abroad, in the international media. At the same time he was the Head of the Working Group for the creation of Branding Greece.

In 2014 Greek local elections he was candidate for Regional Governor of Western Greece.

In January 2015 he was elected as MP for the Prefecture of Achaea, ranking first in the ballot.

In November 2015 he was appointed as the Deputy Secretary of the Parliamentary Group of the New Democracy party. He was re-elected in the elections of September 2015 and July 2019.

On 10 September 2020, he was elected Chairman of the Special Permanent Committee on Research and Technology of the Hellenic Parliament.

On 31 August 2021 he was appointed by Prime Minister Kyriakos Mitsotakis as the Deputy Minister of Foreign Affairs, overseeing matters related to the Greek diaspora.
