= Spyros Tsironis =

Greek politician (born 1976)

Member of the Hellenic Parliament
- Incumbent
- Assumed office June 25, 2023

Personal details
- Born: 1976 (age 49–50) Patras
- Party: Niki
- Profession: Physiotherapist

Spyridon (Spyros) Tsironis (born 1976) is a Greek physiotherapist (PhD) and politician, Member of the Hellenic Parliament representing the Achaea constituency and elected with the Niki political party since the Legislative Elections of June 2023. He originates from Magoula Aetolia-Akarnania.

== Early years ==
Born in Patras, Achaea in 1976, studied physiotherapy at the National Academy of Physical Education and Sport in Bucharest and holds a master's degree (MSc) in health care management. He also holds a PhD in athlete rehabilitation.

He has worked at the General Hospital of Patras "Agios Andreas" and as an assistant professor at the Faculty of Physiotherapy of the University of Patras.

Before his political career he has been a member of the Association "ENOMENI ROMIOSYNI", a "Centre of Unity and study-promotion of the Hellenic values". “Enomeni Romiosyni” is an association which tries to communicate the principles and values of Greece under the umbrella of the Greek Orthodox confession.

== Political career ==
In the elections of May 2023 he was a candidate MP in the Achaea constituency, coming first in the polls, with 2,170 votes, failing to be elected as the party received less than 3% nationwide. In the June 2023 elections, he was elected MP for Achaea. In the Hellenic Parliament, he is a parliamentary representative and a member of the European Affairs and Economic Affairs Committees.

In his interventions in the Greek parliament and in his parliamentary work in general, he very often deals with issues related to illegal immigration, the spread of the woke agenda and the individualism that is cultivated in Europe. He perceives the fundamental pillars of United Europe as being Athens, Rome and Christianity.

Tsironis hit the headlines in Greece in November 2024, when he participated in a meeting of the BRICS in Sochi together with MPs and MEPs from several European Countries and met the vice President of the Russian Security Council, Dmitry Medvedev.
