= Opinion polling for the January 2015 Greek parliamentary election =

In the run up to the January 2015 Greek parliamentary election, various organisations carry out opinion polling to gauge voting intention in Greece. Results of such polls are displayed in this article.

The date range for these opinion polls are from the previous general election, held on 17 June 2012, to the day the next election was held, on 25 January 2015.

== Election polling ==
=== Vote ===
Graphical summary

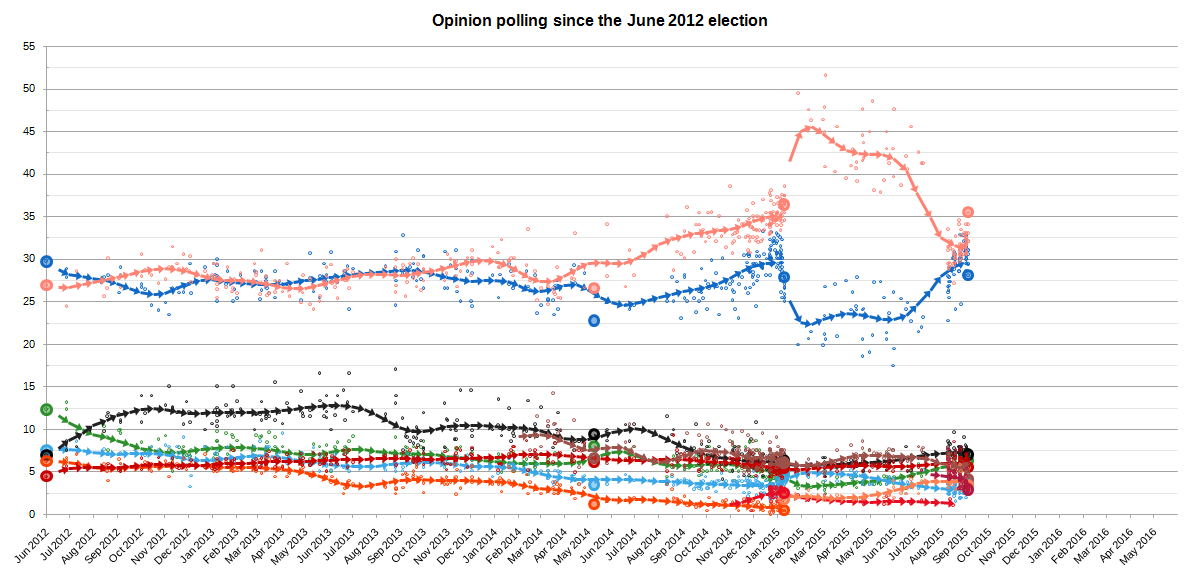
Graph of polling from the June 2012 election to the January 2015 election, showing 15-day average trend lines

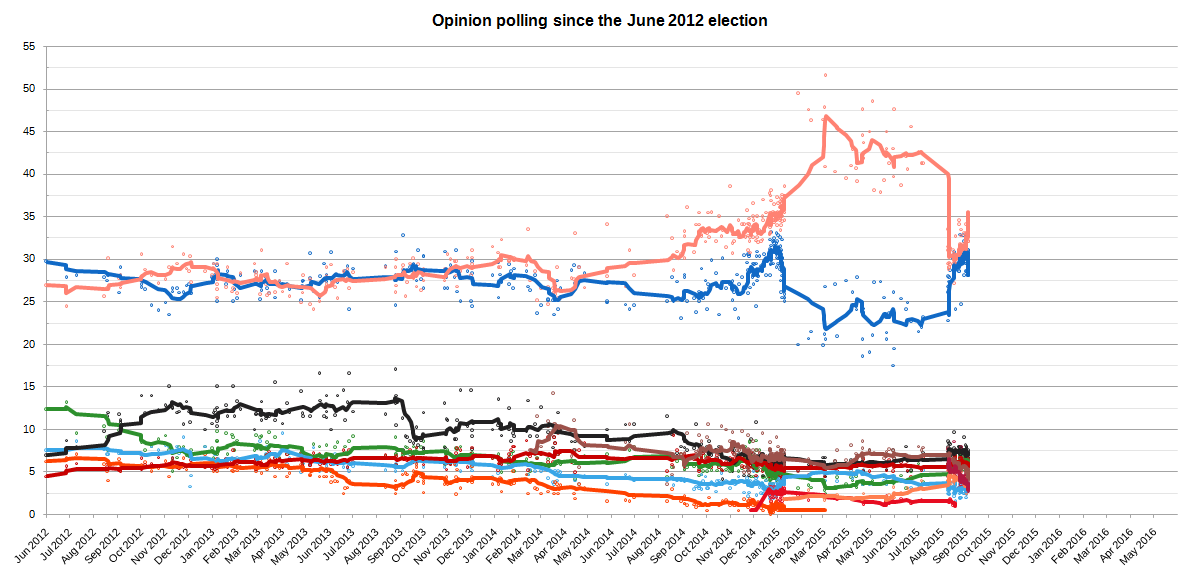
Graph of polling from the June 2012 election to the January 2015 election, showing 8-poll moving average trend lines

Poll results

Poll results are listed in the table below in reverse chronological order, showing the most recent first, and using the date the survey's fieldwork was done, as opposed to the date of publication. If such date is unknown, the date of publication is given instead. The highest percentage figure in each polling survey is displayed in bold, and the background shaded in the leading party's colour. In the instance that there is a tie, then no figure is shaded. The lead column on the right shows the percentage-point difference between the two parties with the highest figures. When a specific poll does not show a data figure for a party, the party's cell corresponding to that poll is shown empty. The threshold for a party to elect members is 3%.

Color key:

Poll conducted after legal ban on opinion polls Exit poll

Polling Firm/Link	Last Date of Polling	ND	SYRIZA	PASOK	ANEL	XA	DIMAR	KKE	Potami	Kinima	Margin of Error	Sample Size	Lead
Parliamentary election	January 25, 2015	27.8	**36.3**	4.7	4.8	6.3	0.5	5.5	6.0	2.5			8.5
Singular Logic	January 25, 2015	27.7	**36.5**	4.8	4.7	6.3		5.6	5.9	2.4			8.8
Public Issue	January 25, 2015	27.8	**36.6**	4.8	4.7	6.2		5.6	5.8	2.6			8.8
Marc/Metron/GPO/Alco/MRB	January 25, 2015	27.0	**37.0**	4.7	4.5	6.5	0.5	5.5	6.5	2.7	±1.1 pp	8,000	10.0
Interview	January 25, 2015	28.0	**37.0**	4.0	5.0	6.0	1.0	5.0	7.5	2.0			9.0
Palmos Analysis	January 25, 2015	25.8	**38.5**	4.0	4.6	6.8		5.3	6.6	2.5	±3.1 pp	1,017	12.7
PAMAK	January 25, 2015	25.5	**37.5**	5.0	3.5	7.9	0.8	6.0	7.5	2.5			12.0
Marc/Metron/GPO/Alco/MRB	January 25, 2015	25.0	**37.5**	4.7	4.0	7.2	0.5	5.2	7.2	2.7	±1.1 pp	8,000	12.5
Pulse RC	January 25, 2015	27.5	**37.5**	5.5	4.0	6.0		5.0	6.5	3.0	±2.2 pp	2,261	10.0
Kapa Research	January 25, 2015	26.5	**35.5**	5.0	4.0	6.5		5.5	6.0	2.7	±1.3 pp	6,000	9.0
	January 25, 2015	26.6	**34.5**	4.5	4.3	6.4		5.0	6.2	2.9			7.9
GPO	January 23, 2015	29.6	**37.0**	5.5	3.9	5.6		5.4	5.5	3.2			7.4
MRB	January 23, 2015	30.0	**35.9**	4.6	3.7	6.3		5.2	7.5	2.8			5.9
Interview	January 23, 2015	29.9	**36.6**	4.7	2.7	6.7	1.0	4.7	6.1	1.9	±3.1 pp	1,005	6.7
Kapa Research	January 23, 2015	31.7	**35.2**	5.4	3.0	6.4		5.2	5.8	2.9	±3.1 pp	1,019	3.5
PAMAK	January 23, 2015	28.5	**36.0**	5.5	4.0	6.5	0.5	6.0	7.5	1.5	±2.9 pp	1,048	7.5
Alco	January 23, 2015	30.1	**37.6**	5.1	4.1	6.2	1.1	4.2	6.2	2.6	±3.1 pp	1,000	7.5
Palmos Analysis	January 23, 2015	25.5	**36.5**	4.5	4.0	6.5		6.0	7.5		±3.1 pp	1,019	11.0
Public Issue	January 23, 2015	29.0	**35.0**	5.0	3.5	6.5	0.5	6.0	7.5	2.5	±3.2 pp	1,033	6.0
Metron Analysis	January 23, 2015	30.0	**36.5**	4.5	3.5	6.0		5.0	7.0	2.5	±2.0 pp	2,509	6.5
Pulse RC	January 22, 2015	30.0	**35.5**	5.5	4.0	6.0		5.0	6.5	3.0			5.5
GPO	January 22, 2015	29.6	**36.3**	4.9	3.8	5.6	1.1	5.6	6.5	3.3			6.7
Palmos Analysis	January 22, 2015	26.0	**36.0**	4.5	3.5	7.5		5.5	7.5		±2.8 pp	1,221	10.0
AUEB-STAT	January 22, 2015	31.0	**33.9**	6.0	4.3	6.1	0.6	5.0	5.8	3.0	±1.3 pp	5,593	2.9
Rass	January 21, 2015	29.2	**34.5**	4.7	4.2	5.6		5.9	7.0	2.8	±3.1 pp	1,003	5.3
Marc	January 21, 2015	28.7	**36.8**	4.4	3.4	6.9	1.1	4.9	7.0	2.6	±2.9 pp	1,153	8.1
Metron Analysis	January 21, 2015	30.7	**36.0**	4.0	4.2	5.4		4.9	7.2	1.6			5.3
Metrisi	January 21, 2015	32.5	**34.7**	5.3	2.9	5.8	0.8	4.6	5.7	2.6	±2.5 pp	1,008	2.2
Public Issue	January 21, 2015	30.0	**35.0**	5.5	3.5	6.5	0.5	6.0	7.0	2.5	±3.2 pp	1,010	5.0
ProRata	January 20, 2015	27.5	**36.0**	5.5	4.0	6.5	0.5	6.0	7.5	2.0			8.5
Pulse RC	January 20, 2015	30.5	**35.0**	6.0	3.5	6.5		5.5	7.0	3.0	±2.9 pp	1,207	4.5
Rass	January 20, 2015	30.3	**35.1**	4.5	3.5	5.1		6.2	7.1	2.5	±3.1 pp	1,003	4.8
E-Voice	January 20, 2015	29.6	**33.3**	5.1	4.3	6.1		6.0	6.1	2.9	±3.1 pp	1,000	3.7
Alco	January 20, 2015	31.4	**37.1**	4.6	3.5	5.3	1.2	4.8	6.5	2.3	±3.1 pp	1,000	5.7
GPO	January 19, 2015	30.1	**34.7**	5.8	3.4	5.9	1.1	5.5	5.9	2.9	±2.8 pp	1,202	4.6
PAMAK	January 18, 2015	29.5	**36.5**	5.0	3.5	6.0	0.5	6.0	8.0	1.5	±2.9 pp	1,014	7.0
Metrisi	January 18, 2015	30.2	**32.4**	4.4	2.2	5.1	0.7	4.4	5.6	2.5	±2.5 pp	1,008	2.2
E-Voice	January 17, 2015	30.4	**33.9**	4.5	4.2	6.4		5.6	5.5	2.8			3.5
Alco	January 17, 2015	32.0	**37.2**	4.8	3.8	5.6		4.8	6.0	2.6	±3.1 pp	1,000	5.2
ToThePoint	January 15, 2015	30.6	**34.6**	6.5	3.0	6.6		6.5	7.0	2.3	±3 pp	1,002	4.0
Rass	January 15, 2015	30.2	**34.7**	4.9	4.1	5.9		6.1	7.1	2.5	±3.1 pp	1,003	4.5
Interview	January 15, 2015	33.0	**35.2**	4.1	2.1	5.8	0.8	4.7	5.9	2.3	±3.1 pp	1,000	2.2
Kapa Research	January 15, 2015	31.8	**35.3**	5.7	3.1	5.3		5.5	6.1	3.1	±3.0 pp	1,037	3.5
Metron Analysis	January 15, 2015	30.8	**35.4**	4.2	3.0	5.4		5.1	7.1	2.7	±2.6 pp	1,405	4.6
Palmos Analysis	January 15, 2015	29.0	**34.5**	4.0	3.0	6.5		5.5	9.0		±3.0 pp	1,098	5.5
Public Issue	January 15, 2015	30.5	**35.5**	5.0	3.0	6.5	1.5	7.0	7.0	2.0	±3.2 pp	1,009	5.0
Pulse RC	January 14, 2015	31.0	**34.5**	6.5	3.5	6.5		5.0	7.0	3.0	±2.9 pp	1,205	3.5
AUEB-STAT	January 14, 2015	28.6	**33.4**	6.4	3.8	5.5		5.8	6.7	3.1	±1.2 pp	6,589	4.8
Metrisi	January 13, 2015	31.8	**34.3**	4.7	2.3	5.2	1.2	5.0	6.1	3.1	±3.1 pp	1,000	2.5
Alco	January 13, 2015	32.4	**36.4**	4.2	3.0	5.8		4.7	5.9	2.8	±3.1 pp	1,000	4.0
Rass	January 12, 2015	32.1	**35.6**	4.2	3.2	5.7		5.2	6.8	2.7	±3.1 pp	1,002	3.5
PAMAK	January 12, 2015	29.5	**34.5**	3.5	3.5	6.5	0.5	6.5	7.0	2.0	±2.8 pp	1,025	5.0
Interview	January 11, 2015	31.8	**34.1**	4.9	2.0	6.1	0.2	4.9	6.6	2.4	±3.1 pp	1,000	2.3
Data RC	January 9, 2015	29.5	**35.3**	4.1	2.7	5.2		6.0	7.1	2.6	±3.1 pp	1,025	5.8
Alco	January 9, 2015	33.1	**36.9**	4.7	2.6	5.0		4.4	5.3	2.8	±3.1 pp	1,000	3.8
Metrisi	January 9, 2015	31.6	**34.4**	5.5	2.5	5.9	1.4	5.2	5.8	3.3	±2.5 pp	1,005	2.8
Pulse RC	January 9, 2015	30.5	**34.5**	6.5	3.5	6.5		5.0	6.5	3.0	±2.8 pp	1,183	4.0
Public Issue	January 9, 2015	30.0	**38.0**	5.5	3.0	5.5	1.0	5.0	7.0	1.5	±3.2 pp	1,005	8.0
E-Voice	January 8, 2015	31.1	**34.8**	4.4	1.9	5.2		5.9	5.7	2.2			3.7
Kapa Research	January 8, 2015	29.9	**33.0**	6.1	3.1	6.3		5.9	7.6	3.3	±3.1 pp	1,010	3.1
Rass	January 8, 2015	32.3	**35.5**	4.0	3.0	6.2		5.7	6.0	2.6	±3.1 pp	1,003	3.2
MRB	January 8, 2015	30.1	**33.7**	5.5	3.1	5.4	1.1	5.7	6.8	2.9	±3.1 pp	1,009	3.6
Metron Analysis	January 8, 2015	30.0	**34.1**	4.1	3.5	5.6		5.3	8.4	2.8	±2.4 pp	1,607	4.1
Marc	January 8, 2015	30.3	**33.9**	4.4	3.1	6.3		5.7	6.4	3.0	±3.1 pp	1,007	3.6
Palmos Analysis	January 8, 2015	28.0	**34.0**	3.5	3.0	7.5		5.5	7.5		±2.9 pp	1,119	6.0
GPO	January 7, 2015	29.4	**33.1**	5.8	3.1	6.3		6.6	6.7	3.0			3.7
ProRata	January 7, 2015	31.0	**37.5**	3.5	2.5	5.5		6.5	6.5	2.0	±2.9 pp	1,145	6.5
Pulse RC	January 6, 2015	30.0	**34.0**	6.5	3.5	6.5		6.0	6.5	3.0	±2.8 pp	1,287	4.0
Interview	January 6, 2015	30.5	**32.9**	4.4	2.1	6.9	0.2	5.6	7.6	2.5			2.4
Alco	January 6, 2015	34.1	**37.7**	4.3	2.6	4.9		4.5	5.0	3.0	±3.1 pp	1,000	3.6
Palmos Analysis	January 3, 2015	28.0	**35.5**	4.0	4.0	6.5		5.5	6.5		±3.1 pp	1,006	7.5
E-Voice	January 2, 2015	30.1	**34.1**	4.3	3.3	5.3		5.5	6.8				4.0
Interview	December 31, 2014	30.5	**33.3**	6.0	2.4	6.1	0.9	6.1	6.1				2.8
Rass	December 30, 2014	33.2	**37.0**	4.3	3.0	4.6		5.8	5.7		±3.1 pp	1,002	3.8
PAMAK	December 30, 2014	29.5	**34.5**	4.5	2.5	7.0	0.5	6.0	6.0		±2.8 pp	1,011	5.0
Marc	December 28, 2014	28.9	**32.3**	5.3	3.5	6.8	1.2	6.2	7.0		±3.1 pp	1,017	3.4
Palmos Analysis	December 28, 2014	29.0	**35.0**	4.5	3.5	7.0		5.0	9.5		±3.1 pp	1,029	6.0
Interview	December 27, 2014	29.1	**32.0**	6.4	2.4	6.8	0.7	6.5	5.5				2.9
Kapa Research	December 24, 2014	30.3	**33.3**	7.5	3.1	6.7		7.1	7.1		±3.1 pp	1,005	3.0
Marc	December 23, 2014	27.9	**31.9**	5.1	3.7	6.4	1.4	6.0	6.5		±3.1 pp	1,003	4.0
Palmos Analysis	December 22, 2014	27.5	**32.5**	5.0	4.5	6.0		6.0	7.5		±3.1 pp	1,019	5.0
Alco	December 21, 2014	30.9	**35.0**	5.7	3.7	6.4		5.2	5.4		±3.1 pp	1,000	4.1
Pulse RC	December 21, 2014	29.5	**33.5**	7.5	4.0	6.5		6.0	6.5		±3 pp	1,003	4.0
PatrisNews	December 21, 2014	24.4	**32.2**	8.7	4.2	10.8	1.0	4.6	5.3				7.8
Interview	December 20, 2014	30.3	**33.3**	6.2	2.2	5.5	1.1	6.3	5.5		±3.1 pp	1,000	3.0
Rass	December 18, 2014	29.3	**33.5**	5.7	3.5	5.4		6.5	7.2		±3.1 pp	1,002	4.2
Marc	December 17, 2014	28.4	**32.5**	5.5	3.4	6.6	1.6	6.4	6.4				4.1
PAMAK	December 17, 2014	28.0	**35.5**	5.5	3.5	7.0	0.5	5.5	7.5				7.5
Public Issue	December 17, 2014	29.5	**36.5**	6.0	3.5	6.0	1.0	6.0	8.5		±3.2 pp	1,010	7.0
Palmos Analysis	December 16, 2014	27.0	**34.5**	4.5	5.0	6.5		6.0	6.5		±3.1 pp	1,024	7.5
Interview	December 15, 2014	30.3	**33.6**	6.1	2.2	5.8	1.1	6.0	5.1				3.3
GPO	December 15, 2014	27.8	**33.7**	6.1	3.3	6.0		6.6	6.1		±2.6 pp	1,202	5.9
VCitizens	December 14, 2014	29.0	**33.7**	4.5	3.5	8.8	1.4	7.1	6.1	0.7	±3.5 pp	800	4.7
Pulse RC	December 13, 2014	28.5	**32.5**	8.5	4.0	7.0		6.0	6.5		±3 pp	1,004	4.0
MRB	December 13, 2014	26.7	**30.8**	7.0	3.6	5.7	1.9	6.4	7.3		±3.1 pp	1,014	4.1
Interview	December 12, 2014	30.5	**34.0**	6.5	2.6	4.6	1.5	5.5	4.9		±3.1 pp	1,000	3.5
Alco	December 12, 2014	30.3	**34.8**	6.3	3.7	7.1		5.5	5.2		±3.1 pp	1,000	4.5
Kapa Research	December 11, 2014	28.4	**32.0**	8.4	3.4	7.4		7.3	7.5		±3.1 pp	1,014	3.6
Interview	December 10, 2014	30.5	**34.2**	5.7	2.1	5.2	0.8	6.7	5.4		±3.1 pp	1,004	3.7
ProRata	December 10, 2014	27.0	**36.0**	6.0	3.0	6.5	0.5	6.5	7.0		±3.1 pp	1,008	9.0
Metron Analysis	December 10, 2014	28.6	**32.8**	5.8	3.4	5.6		5.6	9.2		±3.1 pp	1,000	4.2
MRB	December 10, 2014	25.9	**31.0**	6.6	3.8	6.4	1.5	6.5	7.6		±2.2 pp	2,000	5.1
Alco	December 9, 2014	29.6	**35.7**	6.0	4.2	6.9		5.5	5.5		±3.1 pp	1,000	6.1
Pulse RC	December 6, 2014	26.5	**32.5**	8.0	4.0	7.5	1.0	6.5	7.0		±3 pp	1,007	6.0
Interview	December 5, 2014	30.4	**34.0**	6.5	2.6	4.6	1.7	5.5	4.9		±3.1 pp	1,005	3.6
Metron Analysis	December 3, 2014	27.8	**34.0**	5.4	3.8	7.0		5.6	9.7				6.2
Pulse RC	November 29, 2014	27.0	**32.5**	8.0	4.0	7.0	1.0	6.5	7.5		±3 pp	1,018	5.5
Palmos Analysis	November 27, 2014	23.0	**34.5**	5.0	4.5	8.0	0.5	6.5	8.0		±3.1 pp	1,010	11.5
Metron Analysis	November 26, 2014	28.2	**33.1**	6.4	3.7	6.1		6.6	7.5		±3.1 pp	1,004	4.9
PAMAK	November 24, 2014	24.0	**33.0**	4.0	3.5	8.0	1.0	6.5	7.0		±2.7 pp	1,039	9.0
Pulse RC	November 22, 2014	26.0	**32.0**	8.0	4.0	7.5	1.0	7.0	7.0				6.0
Kapa Research	November 19, 2014	27.3	**31.8**	8.4	3.9	7.5		7.3	8.1		±3.1 pp	1,008	4.5
Metron Analysis	November 19, 2014	26.3	**32.9**	5.2	4.0	5.0		6.2	8.3		±3.1 pp	1,001	6.6
MRB	November 19, 2014	25.1	**30.6**	5.1	4.0	6.3	1.4	6.4	9.6		±3.1 pp	1,011	5.5
Public Issue	November 17, 2014	27.0	**38.5**	5.0	3.0	6.0	1.0	6.5	8.5		±3.2 pp	1,005	11.5
Metron Analysis	November 12, 2014	26.5	**31.3**	5.3	3.8	5.8	1.6	6.1	10.0		±3.1 pp	1,001	4.8
Interview	November 6, 2014	30.0	**33.3**	5.9	3.5	4.1	1.5	5.2	5.8		±3.1 pp	1,005	3.3
Metron Analysis	November 5, 2014	26.5	**32.6**	5.1	4.8	5.9		5.3	10.3				6.1
Palmos Analysis	November 3, 2014	23.5	**35.0**	5.5	4.0	8.0	1.0	5.5	7.0		±3.1 pp	1,017	11.5
Rass	October 31, 2014	26.8	**33.5**	5.2	3.8	6.5	1.3	6.9	7.4		±3.1 pp	1,002	6.7
Metrisi	October 30, 2014	28.3	**32.0**	6.2	2.7	7.5	1.1	6.3	6.5		±3.1 pp	1,008	3.7
Alco	October 23, 2014	29.8	**35.4**	5.1	3.7	6.9		5.5	5.7		±3.1 pp	1,000	5.6
Pulse RC	October 21, 2014	26.5	**32.5**	8.0	3.5	8.5	2.0	6.5	7.0		±3 pp	1,222	6.0
Public Issue	October 20, 2014	27.0	**35.5**	6.0	3.0	6.0	1.0	6.5	10.5		±3.2 pp	1,007	8.5
Metron Analysis	October 15, 2014	26.1	**32.9**	4.7	4.7	6.3		6.8	8.5		±3.1 pp	1,001	6.8
Kapa Research	October 15, 2014	27.5	**32.1**	6.8	4.5	7.5	1.3	6.2	6.6		±3.1 pp	1,028	4.6
PAMAK	October 15, 2014	24.0	**33.0**	5.0	3.0	8.0	0.5	6.5	9.0		±2.7 pp	1,015	9.0
GPO	October 13, 2014	25.3	**33.5**	5.0	3.8	7.2		7.2	7.5		±2.6 pp	1,202	8.2
Metrisi	October 10, 2014	28.9	**32.6**	6.5	2.9	8.2	1.1	6.5	5.5		±3.1 pp	1,008	3.7
Metron Analysis	October 8, 2014	26.2	**34.1**	4.6	3.3	7.0	1.3	5.3	9.1		±3.1 pp	1,000	7.9
Palmos Analysis	October 8, 2014	25.0	**35.5**	6.5	3.0	6.0	1.0	5.0	7.5		±3.1 pp	1,014	10.5
AUEB-STAT	October 4, 2014	23.7	**34.1**	6.8	3.3	10.5	0.8	6.4	7.4		±1.8 pp	2,878	10.4
E-Voice	October 2, 2014	25.3	**30.7**	5.6	2.9	7.7	1.2	6.4	6.7		±3.1 pp	1,001	5.4
Public Issue	September 23, 2014	25.0	**36.0**	5.5	4.0	7.5	1.0	6.5	9.5		±3.2 pp	1,008	11.0
Rass	September 18, 2014	27.8	**32.6**	5.3	4.0	8.5	1.3	7.0	5.9		±3.1 pp	1,001	4.8
MRB	September 18, 2014	25.3	**30.0**	5.3	4.1	8.5	1.3	6.5	7.1		±3.1 pp	1,006	4.7
Alco	September 18, 2014	28.3	**33.1**	5.5	3.9	7.9	2.2	5.6	5.5		±3.1 pp	1,000	4.8
PAMAK	September 15, 2014	23.0	**30.5**	7.0	4.0	8.0	1.5	7.0	7.0		±2.6 pp	1,021	7.5
Metron Analysis	September 10, 2014	27.4	**31.0**	6.2	4.0	7.1		7.5	6.4		±3.1 pp	1,001	3.6
E-Voice	September 4, 2014	25.0	**28.6**	6.8	3.4	10.0	1.8	9.2	5.5		±3.1 pp	1,000	3.6
Alco	September 3, 2014	27.8	**32.4**	5.5	4.5	9.4	2.9	5.9	4.7		±3.1 pp	1,000	4.6
Palmos Analysis	August 28, 2014	25.0	**35.0**	4.5	4.0	11.5	1.5	5.0	3.5		±2.2 pp	2,000	10.0
Pulse RC	July 16, 2014	24.5	**28.5**	8.5	4.0	10.5	2.0	6.5	8.5		±2.8 pp	1,253	4.0
Public Issue	July 9, 2014	24.0	**31.0**	7.5	4.5	8.5	1.5	6.5	10.5				7.0
MRB	July 4, 2014	24.7	**26.8**	7.9	4.7	10.6	1.6	6.4	8.4		±2.2 pp	2,000	2.1
Metron Analysis	June 11, 2014	24.9	**27.9**			8.7							3.0
Public Issue	June 10, 2014	25.0	**34.0**	7.0	3.5	10.0	1.5	6.5	6.0				9.0
EP Election	May 25, 2014	22.7	**26.6**	8.0	3.5	9.4	1.2	6.1	6.6				3.9
Local Elections	May 25, 2014	**26.3**	17.7	16.2	3.2	8.1	3.8	8.8					8.6
Alco	May 22, 2014	25.8	**30.0**	6.6	4.1	9.6	2.2	6.0	7.2		±2.9 pp	1,200	4.2
Kapa Research	May 18, 2014	24.6	**29.7**	6.7	4.3	9.4	1.5	6.9	8.8				5.1
Alco	May 14, 2014	26.4	**28.1**	6.1	5.5	8.8	2.9	6.0	8.6		±3.2 pp	1,000	1.7
GPO	May 12, 2014	**28.3**	26.7	6.8	4.6	8.0	3.2	8.3	8.1				1.6
Kapa Research	May 8, 2014	24.9	**26.4**	6.3	4.7	8.7	2.4	7.3	10.3		±2.9 pp	1,149	1.5
Public Issue	May 6, 2014	**29.0**	**29.0**	6.0	3.5	8.5	3.5	7.5	5.5		±3.2 pp	1,005	Tie
Palmos Analysis	May 1, 2014	27.1	**33.0**	4.1	4.0	8.6	1.9	4.9	7.5		±3.1 pp	1,006	5.9
Metron Analysis	April 30, 2014	**29.2**	27.6	6.0	4.7	7.5	2.5	6.2	11.0				1.6
Alco	April 25, 2014	**28.6**	27.7	6.3	4.6	8.6	3.2	6.1	6.8		±3.2 pp	1,000	0.9
MRB	April 11, 2014	**26.5**	25.3	5.9	4.9	9.9	3.4	7.3	10.0		±3.1 pp	1,006	1.2
Pulse RC	April 9, 2014	24.0	**25.5**	7.0	5.0	12.0	2.5	7.0	9.5				1.5
Public Issue	April 8, 2014	27.5	**29.0**	6.0	4.0	10.0	3.5	7.0	7.0		±3.2 pp	1,006	1.5
GPO	April 7, 2014	**26.9**	25.8	7.1	5.2	8.3	3.7	8.3	10.4		±2.6 pp	1,402	1.1
PAMAK	April 4, 2014	21.5	**25.0**	5.5	4.5	9.5	2.5	9.0	11.5		±2.8 pp	1,208	3.5
Kapa Research	April 3, 2014	25.8	**26.7**	5.7	5.0	9.6	2.1	7.7	10.5		±3.1 pp	1,003	0.9
Metron Analysis	April 3, 2014	25.1	**26.5**	5.8	3.7	7.9	3.2	6.1	14.2		±2.4 pp	1,602	1.4
Kapa Research	April 2, 2014	**26.8**	24.2	6.7	4.8	8.5	2.6	7.2	11.3		±3.1 pp	1,006	2.6
Alco	March 27, 2014	**25.1**	24.6	6.4	5.2	9.6	3.2	9.0	10.9		±3.2 pp	1,000	0.5
Palmos Analysis	March 27, 2014	25.2	**26.8**	5.2	4.2	10.3	2.7	6.1	10.3		±3.1 pp	1,012	1.6
Pulse RC	March 18, 2014	24.5	**26.5**	7.0	5.0	12.5	2.5	7.0	8.0		±2.7 pp	1,289	0.5
Alco	March 13, 2014	23.6	**25.1**	6.7	5.9	9.1	2.9	6.6	11.5		±3.2 pp	1,000	1.5
PAMAK	March 12, 2014	17.0	**23.5**	5.5	2.0	11.5	2.5	10.0	16.5		±3.0 pp	1,005	6.5
Public Issue	March 10, 2014	28.0	**28.5**	5.5	5.0	10.5	3.0	7.5	7.0		±3.2 pp	1,015	0.5
Alco	March 4, 2014	26.3	**27.5**	5.0	5.3	9.1	3.7	6.8	7.5		±3.2 pp	1,000	1.2
Palmos Analysis	March 1, 2014	27.2	**33.1**	4.9	5.1	12.1	2.5	5.8			±3.1 pp	1,001	5.9
Metron Analysis	February 26, 2014	28.5	**29.2**	6.4	5.9	9.7	4.7	8.7					0.7
Alco	February 11, 2014	27.1	**29.0**	5.4	6.6	10.0	4.1	7.3			±3.2 pp	1,000	1.9
GPO	February 10, 2014	26.5	**28.1**	7.4	5.8	9.5	5.0	8.0			±3.0 pp	1,002	1.6
Public Issue	February 7, 2014	28.5	**30.0**	7.0	6.0	8.5	3.5	7.5			±3.2 pp	1,007	1.5
Marc	February 5, 2014	27.0	**29.8**	6.6	5.9	10.0	5.5	6.6					2.8
Metrisi	February 5, 2014	29.3	**29.7**	5.8	6.6	12.4	3.8	7.0			±3.1 pp	1,008	0.4
Palmos Analysis	January 25, 2014	27.2	**32.3**	4.9	5.9	9.3	2.7	5.8			±3.1 pp	1,001	5.1
Alco	January 24, 2014	28.2	**29.0**	6.1	5.6	10.1	4.2	6.0			±3.2 pp	1,000	0.8
Metron Analysis	January 22, 2014	29.2	**30.4**	6.4	4.8	10.3	3.7	5.0			±3.1 pp	1,004	1.2
Pulse RC	January 21, 2014	25.5	**29.0**	7.0	5.5	13.5	3.5	6.0			±2.7 pp	1,353	3.5
Public Issue	January 13, 2014	28.0	**31.5**	6.5	4.5	10.0	3.5	6.5			±3.2 pp	1,008	3.5
Kapa Research	December 19, 2013	28.3	**29.3**	7.3	5.2	9.8	3.7	6.9			±3.1 pp	1,010	1.0
Rass	December 19, 2013	29.7	**30.2**	5.6	5.9	7.6	4.3	7.9			±3.1 pp	1,003	0.5
Palmos Analysis	December 19, 2013	24.4	**31.0**	6.3	6.4	9.1	5.6	6.5			±3.1 pp	1,012	6.6
Pulse RC	December 18, 2013	25.0	**28.0**	7.0	5.5	14.5	4.0	7.0			±2.8 pp	1,203	3.0
MRB	December 11, 2013	27.9	**29.1**	6.3	6.4	11.8	4.1	6.6			±2.2 pp	2,000	1.2
Metron Analysis	December 8, 2013	28.5	**30.2**	6.5	6.9	10.3	3.9	5.5			±2.4 pp	1,603	1.7
Pulse RC	December 3, 2013	25.0	**28.5**	8.0	5.0	14.5	3.0	7.5					3.5
GPO	November 30, 2013	26.2	**26.8**	7.6	6.8	11.0	5.2	7.7			±2.9 pp	1,017	0.6
Kapa Research	November 28, 2013	**28.9**	28.1	7.7	5.7	9.9	4.3	6.3			±3.1 pp	1,009	0.8
Metrisi	November 28, 2013	**31.0**	29.7	6.2	5.9	8.8	2.3	7.1			±3.1 pp	1,001	1.3
Marc	November 25, 2013	27.8	**29.7**	6.4	6.7	8.8	5.8	6.6					1.9
Metron Analysis	November 20, 2013	29.2	**29.9**	6.0	5.9	10.0	3.7	5.9			±3.1 pp	1,001	0.7
Palmos Analysis	November 16, 2013	26.5	**30.5**	7.5	6.4	11.0	3.5	6.0			±3.1 pp	1,001	4.0
Alco	November 15, 2013	27.8	**28.3**	6.4	6.7	11.1	4.3	5.3			±3.2 pp	1,000	0.5
Rass	November 14, 2013	**30.9**	28.9	5.9	6.1	7.9	4.0	7.4			±3.1 pp	1,002	2.0
Pulse RC	November 12, 2013	27.0	**27.5**	8.0	5.5	13.0	3.5	6.0			±2.8 pp	1,207	0.5
Metron Analysis	October 16, 2013	**30.3**	28.9	7.1	6.4	7.6	3.6	5.9			±3.1 pp	1,001	1.4
Metrisi	October 16, 2013	**30.3**	28.6	7.1	6.5	7.9	2.6	7.1			±2.9 pp	1,105	1.7
Pulse RC	October 16, 2013	26.5	**27.5**	8.0	5.5	12.0	4.0	7.0			±2.8 pp	1,217	1.0
Alco	October 14, 2013	**27.2**	26.3	7.8	6.5	8.7	4.7	6.3			±3.2 pp	1,000	0.9
Rass	October 10, 2013	**31.0**	29.3	6.4	6.2	8.1	3.9	6.7			±3.1 pp	1,004	1.7
GPO	October 7, 2013	**27.5**	26.8	7.9	5.9	10.2	5.5	7.9			±2.7 pp	1,032	0.7
Marc	October 7, 2013	**28.6**	28.3	6.7	6.5	8.9	5.8	6.2					0.3
Palmos Analysis	October 4, 2013	27.8	**30.0**	6.9	6.3	9.7	4.5	6.2			±3.1 pp	1,009	0.5
MRB	October 3, 2013	**28.5**	27.7	6.8	6.3	9.0	4.7	6.5			±3.1 pp	1,003	0.8
Alco	October 3, 2013	**29.5**	28.3	8.0	6.5	8.3	5.0	6.1			±3.2 pp	1,000	1.2
VPRC	September 30, 2013	29.0	**29.5**	7.0	6.0	8.5	4.0	7.5					0.5
Alco	September 26, 2013	**28.8**	27.2	7.9	7.2	9.0	4.7	6.3			±3.2 pp	1,000	1.6
MRB	September 26, 2013	**29.0**	27.5	7.2	6.9	8.9	4.3	6.5			±3.1 pp	1,000	1.5
Alco	September 23, 2013	**28.0**	25.6	8.0	6.7	9.1	4.8	6.5			±3.2 pp	1,000	2.4
Rass	September 21, 2013	**32.7**	29.2	6.8	5.5	7.5	3.2	7.3			±3.1 pp	1,002	3.5
Metron Analysis	September 19, 2013	28.3	**28.7**	7.0	5.2	11.2	4.7	6.7			±3.1 pp	1,006	0.4
Metrisi	September 12, 2013	**27.5**	26.9	7.0	6.6	14.0	2.9	6.8					0.6
Rass	September 12, 2013	**30.9**	29.9	5.9	6.0	10.4	3.0	5.7			±3.1 pp	1,002	1.0
Pulse RC	September 10, 2013	24.5	**26.5**	9.0	5.0	17.5	4.0	6.5					2.0
Public Issue	September 10, 2013	28.0	**29.0**	7.0	5.5	13.0	2.5	6.5			±3.2 pp	1,024	2.5
Metron Analysis	August 28, 2013	**29.1**	29.0	6.8	5.0	11.7	3.1	6.9			±3.1 pp	1,001	0.1
Kapa Research	July 18, 2013	**28.9**	28.4	9.1	5.6	12.1	3.5	6.1					0.5
Pulse RC	July 13, 2013	24.0	**26.5**	8.5	5.0	16.5	4.0	7.5					2.5
Metron Analysis	July 10, 2013	**29.1**	28.7	7.3	5.4	13.1	3.2	5.5			±3.1 pp	1,001	0.4
Public Issue	July 8, 2013	**28.5**	27.5	8.0	7.0	11.0	3.0	7.0			±3.2 pp	1,011	1.0
VPRC	July 5, 2013	28.0	**28.5**	7.0	5.5	14.5	2.5	7.5					0.5
Alco	June 27, 2013	**27.2**	25.2	8.5	6.0	14.0	3.9	5.9			±3.2 pp	1,000	2.0
MRB	June 25, 2013	**28.1**	26.6	7.8	7.0	11.6	3.8	6.5			±3.1 pp	1,014	1.5
MRB	June 21, 2013	**27.5**	27.1	6.5	6.7	12.7	4.5	6.8			±2.2 pp	2,000	0.4
Rass	June 20, 2013	**30.7**	29.4	5.0	5.1	10.0	3.7	5.8			±3.1 pp	1,003	1.3
Metrisi	June 17, 2013	**27.3**	26.7	6.6	6.8	13.3	6.2	7.4					0.6
Metron Analysis	June 13, 2013	**28.2**	27.9	6.5	6.3	11.4	6.4	5.0			±3.1 pp	1,003	0.3
Kapa Research	June 13, 2013	**27.4**	27.0	8.1	5.6	12.1	5.0	6.5			±3.1 pp	1,003	0.4
VPRC	June 13, 2013	26.5	**29.0**	7.0	6.0	14.0	4.5	7.0			±3.1 pp	1,004	2.5
Public Issue	June 11, 2013	**29.5**	27.5	6.5	6.0	11.5	4.5	6.0			±3.2 pp	1,028	2.0
MRB	June 6, 2013	**27.9**	25.6	6.4	6.9	13.4	6.2	5.8			±3.1 pp	1,009	2.3
Pulse RC	June 4, 2013	**25.5**	25.0	7.5	5.0	16.5	4.5	7.0			±2.8 pp	1,229	0.5
GPO	May 27, 2013	**26.2**	24.0	8.2	7.9	12.4	6.3	7.1			±2.7 pp	1,200	2.2
Rass	May 24, 2013	**30.6**	27.6	5.9	6.0	11.5	4.7	5.7			±3.1 pp	1,005	3.0
Alco	May 24, 2013	**27.7**	24.6	6.4	5.8	12.2	4.5	5.7			±3.2 pp	1,000	3.1
Metrisi	May 19, 2013	**27.3**	26.1	5.4	7.2	12.8	5.7	5.9					1.2
Public Issue	May 15, 2013	27.5	**28.0**	6.5	6.0	11.5	5.5	6.5			±3.2 pp	1,031	0.5
Marc	May 13, 2013	**27.3**	26.1	6.0	7.1	11.8	5.0	5.7			±3.1 pp	1,002	1.2
AUEB-STAT	May 12, 2013	**25.1**	24.9	7.3	4.9	14.4	5.9	7.2			±1.3 pp	6,093	0.2
Alco	April 26, 2013	**26.5**	25.7	7.1	6.5	12.0	4.8	6.3			±3.2 pp	1,000	0.8
VPRC	April 24, 2013	27.0	**29.5**	7.0	6.0	13.0	4.5	7.0					2.5
Metron Analysis	April 17, 2013	**27.0**	26.2	8.0	9.5	10.7	5.6	5.5					0.8
Metrisi	April 13, 2013	26.8	**27.3**	7.9	7.0	11.7	7.1	6.9					0.5
Marc	April 13, 2013	27.3	**27.5**	6.7	7.3	12.0	5.4	6.4					0.2
Pulse RC	April 9, 2013	25.5	**26.0**	9.0	6.5	15.5	4.5	6.5					0.5
Public Issue	April 9, 2013	**28.5**	27.5	8.0	6.5	11.0	6.5	5.5			±3.2 pp	1,033	1.0
GPO	April 1, 2013	**25.9**	**25.9**	9.6	8.0	11.5	6.4	7.4			±2.9 pp	1,200	Tie
Alco	March 29, 2013	**26.5**	25.7	8.4	8.1	11.8	5.2	6.9			±3.2 pp	1,000	0.8
MRB	March 28, 2013	**27.5**	27.0	6.9	7.7	11.3	6.8	5.8			±3.1 pp	1,008	0.5
Marc	March 28, 2013	27.8	**27.9**	6.8	7.0	11.5	5.5	5.9			±3.1 pp	1,001	0.1
Kapa Research	March 21, 2013	26.3	**27.1**	9.0	5.8	13.3	4.8	6.5					0.8
VPRC	March 21, 2013	28.5	**31.0**	6.0	5.5	11.0	5.5	6.0					2.5
Metron Analysis	March 20, 2013	25.2	**25.8**	9.0	8.5	11.7	6.3	5.5			±3.1 pp	1,002	0.6
Metrisi	March 15, 2013	**28.4**	28.0	9.2	5.9	11.9	5.0	6.4					0.4
Marc	March 15, 2013	27.4	**28.4**	6.8	6.6	11.7	5.7	5.3			±3.1 pp	1,001	1.0
Public Issue	March 12, 2013	28.5	**29.5**	7.5	8.0	10.0	6.0	5.5			±3.2 pp	1,017	1.0
Marc	February 22, 2013	28.0	**28.3**	6.6	6.6	12.3	5.4	5.5			±2.4 pp	1,604	0.3
Alco	February 19, 2013	25.3	**25.9**	8.7	6.5	13.2	5.2	6.0			±3.2 pp	1,000	0.6
Metron Analysis	February 14, 2013	26.4	**27.6**	7.5	6.2	11.5	5.6	6.4			±3.1 pp	1,003	1.2
Pulse RC	February 13, 2013	25.0	**27.0**	9.0	6.0	15.0	5.0	7.5			±2.7 pp	1,356	2.0
Alco	February 12, 2013	**27.5**	26.2	9.3	6.5	12.2	5.2	6.2			±3.2 pp	1,000	1.3
Public Issue	February 5, 2013	28.5	**29.0**	7.0	8.0	11.5	6.0	5.5			±3.2 pp	1,027	0.5
GPO	February 4, 2013	**27.0**	26.6	9.5	6.6	12.8	6.1	6.4			±2.9 pp	1,200	0.4
Pulse RC	January 24, 2013	25.0	**27.0**	8.0	6.5	15.0	5.0	6.5			±2.3 pp	1,745	2.0
Rass	January 24, 2013	**29.9**	29.5	6.2	5.6	10.3	6.1	5.9			±2.8 pp	1,202	0.5
Alco	January 24, 2013	**28.1**	26.4	9.7	7.4	10.9	5.4	5.9			±3.2 pp	1,000	1.7
MRB	January 24, 2013	**29.2**	27.8	7.0	6.2	11.6	5.6	5.4			±3.1 pp	1,009	1.4
Kapa Research	January 24, 2013	**27.6**	25.5	8.7	5.5	12.6	5.8	6.6			±3.1 pp	1,019	2.1
Marc	January 21, 2013	**28.2**	27.9	7.2	7.0	12.2	5.8	5.3			±3.0 pp	1,054	0.3
VPRC	January 18, 2013	**29.5**	**29.5**	6.5	6.0	12.0	5.0	5.5			±2.8 pp	1,230	Tie
Metron Analysis	January 17, 2013	27.8	**28.0**	7.7	6.3	10.7	5.7	5.4			±3.1 pp	1,006	0.2
Public Issue	January 8, 2013	**29.0**	28.5	8.0	8.0	10.0	7.0	5.5			±3.2 pp	1,027	0.5
Kapa Research	December 21, 2012	25.9	**27.2**	7.5	4.6	11.8	6.0	6.3					1.3
Rass	December 20, 2012	29.5	**30.3**	6.8	3.3	10.8	5.9	5.7			±3.1 pp	1,002	0.8
Marc	December 19, 2012	27.0	**28.5**	7.0	6.8	12.1	5.6	5.9					2.5
Alco	December 14, 2012	26.9	**29.0**	6.9	5.9	13.3	5.3	5.6			±3.2 pp	1,000	2.1
Public Issue	December 10, 2012	26.0	**30.5**	8.0	9.0	10.5	6.5	5.5			±3.2 pp	1,035	4.5
MRB	December 6, 2012	26.1	**28.7**	7.8	7.1	12.1	5.7	5.4			±2.2 pp	2,000	2.6
Metron Analysis	December 3, 2012	26.5	**29.5**	6.7	8.0	12.0	6.0	5.5			±2.2 pp	2,001	3.0
Marc	November 26, 2012	26.2	**29.0**	6.4	7.1	12.4	6.1	5.7			±3.1 pp	1,011	2.8
VPRC	November 26, 2012	26.5	**31.5**	5.0	6.5	12.5	5.5	6.5					5.0
Pulse RC	November 23, 2012	23.5	**29.0**	7.5	8.0	15.0	4.5	6.0			±2.8 pp	1,212	5.5
GPO	November 17, 2012	24.9	**27.6**	9.3	8.1	12.8	6.2	5.7			±2.9 pp	1,200	2.7
Kapa Research	November 8, 2012	23.9	**27.1**	8.8	7.5	12.2	5.3	6.7			±3.1 pp	1,017	3.2
Pulse RC	October 30, 2012	24.5	**28.0**	8.0	8.0	14.0	5.0	6.0			±2.8 pp	1,210	3.5
Marc	October 23, 2012	26.4	**28.8**	7.5	6.9	11.8	6.1	5.9					2.4
VPRC	October 17, 2012	27.0	**30.5**	5.5	7.0	14.0	5.5	6.5					3.5
Rass	October 17, 2012	26.6	**27.9**	8.4	7.2	10.8	5.9	5.3			±2.8 pp	1,204	1.3
MRB	September 20, 2012	**29**	28	10	6	11	5	5			±3.1 pp	1,003	1
Rass	September 20, 2012	**28.0**	26.7	9.5	7.3	10.8	6.0	5.3			±2.8 pp	1,202	1.3
Metron Analysis	September 19, 2012	26.1	**27.7**	9.8	7.2	11.7	6.4	5.1			±3.1 pp	1,002	1.6
VPRC	September 5, 2012	28.0	**30.0**	7.5	7.0	12.0	4.0	6.0					2.0
Pulse RC	September 4, 2012	**27.5**	26.0	9.0	7.5	11.5	5.0	5.5			±2.8 pp	1,204	1.5
Alco	August 31, 2012	**27.8**	25.6	10.3	7.6	9.7	5.8	5.3			±3.2 pp	1,000	2.2
Kapa Research	July 12, 2012	**27.8**	24.4	13.1	7.5	8.7	6.7	5.6			±3.1 pp	1,003	3.4
MRB	July 12, 2012	**28.9**	26.7	12.3	7.7	7.5	6.3	5.1			±3.1 pp	1,011	2.8
Parliamentary election	June 17, 2012	**29.7**	26.9	12.3	7.5	6.9	6.3	4.5					2.8

=== Seat projections ===
Opinion polls showing seat projections are displayed in the table below. The highest seat figures in each polling survey have their background shaded in the leading party's colour. In the instance that there is a tie, then no figure is shaded. 151 seats are required for an absolute majority in the Hellenic Parliament. 50 additional seats are awarded as a majority bonus to the single party winning the largest share of the votes.

151 seats needed for majority
Date	Polling Firm/Source	ND	SYRIZA	PASOK	ANEL	XA	DIMAR	KKE	Potami	KIDISO	Others
**25 Jan 2015**	**Parliamentary election**	76	149	13	13	17	0	15	17	0	0
25 Jan (21:30)	Singular Logic	76	150	13	13	17	0	15	16	0	0
25 Jan (20:45)	Public Issue	76	150	13	13	17	0	15	16	0	0
25 Jan (19:00)	Interview	72	145	10	12	15	0	12	19	0	0
25 Jan (19:00)	Palmos Analysis	71	155	11	12	18	0	15	18	0	0
25 Jan (19:00)	Joint exit poll (Note: Joint exit poll conducted by Alco, GPO, Marc, Metron Analysis and MRB.)	65−75	146−158	12−15	10−13	17−22	0	13−16	17−22	0−8	0
25 Jan (19:00)	Kapa Research	70−78	148−154	12−14	10−12	16−20	0	15−17	16−19	0−8	0
Exit polls
23 Jan	Metron Analysis	81	149	12	9	16	0	14	19	0	0
21–23 Jan	Palmos Analysis	71	150	12	11	19	0	16	21	0	0
20–23 Jan	Public Issue	78	145	14	9	18	0	16	20	0	0
19–22 Jan	Palmos Analysis	72	149	12	10	21	0	15	21	0	0
19–21 Jan	Metron Analysis	83	147	11	11	15	0	13	20	0	0
19–20 Jan	Pulse RC	80	144	16	9	17	0	15	19	0	0
15–17 Jan	Alco	86	147	13	10	15	0	13	16	0	0
16 Jan	Metron Analysis	85	147	12	8	15	0	14	19	0	0
12–15 Jan	Palmos Analysis	79	144	11	8	18	0	15	25	0	0
10–15 Jan	Public Issue	81	144	13	8	17	0	18	19	0	0
13–14 Jan	Pulse RC	81	142	17	9	17	0	15	19	0	0
5–14 Jan	E.Panas	79	143	18	10	15	0	16	19	0	0
2–9 Jan	Public Issue	80	151	15	8	15	0	13	18	0	0
5–8 Jan	MRB	83	143	15	9	15	0	16	19	0	0
5–8 Jan	Metron Analysis	82	144	11	10	15	0	15	23	0	0
5–8 Jan	Palmos Analysis	79	146	10	8	21	0	15	21	0	0
5–6 Jan	Pulse RC	80	141	18	9	18	0	16	18	0	0
30 Dec–3 Jan	Palmos Analysis	78	149	11	11	18	0	15	18		0
2015
26–28 Dec	Palmos Analysis	78	144	12	9	19	0	13	25	Did not exist	0
19–22 Dec	Palmos Analysis	77	141	14	13	17	0	17	21	Did not exist	0
18–22 Dec	Alco (Note: The linked core data of this poll, shows the percentage of support each party would gain among the surveyed sample of the electorate, without disregarding those who were undecided or said they would abstain from voting (either physically or by voting blank). However, in order to obtain results comparable to other polls and the official election results, the result shown in this table has been adjusted based on the simple rule of three, which mean the "group of undecided and/or abstaining voters" have been assumed ultimately to cast their votes (if any) according to the exact same distribution as the group of decided voters (having cast a specific vote in the survey). Or in other words, they are simply disregarded under the assumption they will not cause any change to the already found distribution of votes. After this calculated adjustment, the total of all noted vote shares in the table equals 100%, which is similar to how the results of the official elections are presented. This practice is done for most pollsters, as most of them use and/or have used this system in the past in order to show results comparable to other polls and election results. Exceptionally, Palmos Analysis polls are verified to use a different system than this one, and as such it should not be applied to them.)	83	144	16	10	18	0	14	15	Did not exist	0
19–21 Dec	Pulse RC	78	140	20	10	18	0	16	18	Did not exist	0
14–16 Dec	Palmos Analysis	75	146	12	14	18	0	17	18	Did not exist	0
13 Dec	Alco	80−84	144−148	16−18	9−10	17−19	0	13−15	13−15	Did not exist	0
12–13 Dec	Pulse RC	77	138	22	10	19	0	16	18	Did not exist	0
10–13 Dec	MRB	77	138	20	10	16	0	18	21	Did not exist	0
8–10 Dec	Metron Analysis	79	140	16	10	15	0	15	25	Did not exist	0
1–3 Dec	Metron Analysis	75	141	14	10	19	0	15	26	Did not exist	0
24–27 Nov	Palmos Analysis	64	147	14	13	22	0	18	22	Did not exist	0
24–26 Nov	Metron Analysis	77	140	17	10	17	0	18	21	Did not exist	0
17–19 Nov	Metron Analysis	75	143	15	11	14	0	18	24	Did not exist	0
10–12 Nov	Metron Analysis	75	138	15	11	16	0	17	28	Did not exist	0
3–5 Nov	Metron Analysis	73	140	14	13	16	0	15	29	Did not exist	0
13–20 Oct	Public Issue	71	144	16	8	16	0	17	28	Did not exist	0
13–15 Oct	Metron Analysis	73	141	13	13	17	0	19	24	Did not exist	0
6–8 Oct	Metron Analysis	73	145	13	9	20	0	15	25	Did not exist	0
4–8 Oct	Palmos Analysis	71	150	18	9	17	0	14	21	Did not exist	0
27 Sep–4 Oct	UoA	64	143	19	9	28	0	17	20	Did not exist	0
15–23 Sep	Public Issue	61−72	142−150	12−17	8−13	16−24	0	15−20	20−30	Did not exist	0
18–19 Sep	Rass	76	140	15	11	23	0	19	16	Did not exist	0
16–18 Sep	MRB	73	136	15	12	25	0	19	20	Did not exist	0
16–18 Sep	Alco	79	142	15	11	22	0	16	15	Did not exist	0
11–15 Sep	PAMAK	66	139	20	11	24	0	20	20	Did not exist	0
**25 May 2014**	**EP Election**	(69)	(130)	(24)	(11)	(28)	(0)	(18)	(20)	Did not exist	(0)
2014
2013
**17 Jun 2012**	**Parliamentary election**	129	71	33	20	18	17	12			0

== Voting preferences ==
Polls shown below show the recording of raw responses for each party as a percentage of total responses before disregarding those who opted to abstain and prior to the adjusting for the likely votes of those who were undecided to obtain an estimate of vote share. The highest percentage figure in each polling survey is displayed in bold, and the background shaded in the leading party's colour. In the instance that there is a tie, then no figure is shaded.

Polling Firm/Link	Last Date of Polling	ND	SYRIZA	PASOK	ANEL	XA	DIMAR	KKE	Potami	Kinima	Other	Question
GPO	January 23, 2015	26.7	**33.4**	5.0	3.5	5.1		4.9	5.0	2.9	3.8	9.7
MRB	January 23, 2015	26.0	**31.2**	4.0	3.2	5.5		4.5	6.5	2.4	3.5	13.2
Interview	January 23, 2015	24.6	**30.1**	3.9	2.2	5.5	0.8	3.9	5.0	1.6	4.7	17.7
Kapa Research	January 23, 2015	28.9	**31.8**	4.7	2.6	5.5		4.5	4.9	2.5	4.1	10.5
PAMAK	January 23, 2015	26.5	**33.5**	5.0	3.5	6.0	0.5	5.5	7.0	1.5	4.0	7.0
Alco	January 23, 2015	26.3	**32.9**	4.5	3.6	5.4	1.0	3.7	5.4	2.3	2.3	12.6
Metron Analysis	January 23, 2015	27.0	**32.9**	4.1	3.2	5.4		4.5	6.3	2.3	4.5	10.0
Pulse RC	January 22, 2015	27.0	**32.0**	5.0	3.5	5.5		4.5	6.0	2.5	4.5	9.5
GPO	January 22, 2015	26.5	**32.5**	4.4	3.4	5.0	1.0	5.0	5.8	3.0	3.0	10.4
AUEB-STAT	January 22, 2015	29.3	**32.1**	5.7	4.1	5.8	0.6	4.7	5.5	2.8	3.9	5.4
Rass	January 21, 2015	26.5	**31.3**	4.3	3.8	5.1		5.4	6.4	2.5	5.5	9.2
Marc	January 21, 2015	26.0	**32.2**	4.0	3.1	6.1	1.0	4.4	6.3	2.2	3.7	11.0
Metron Analysis	January 21, 2015	25.2	**29.6**	3.3	3.5	4.4		4.0	5.9	1.4	4.9	17.8
Metrisi	January 21, 2015	30.1	**32.1**	4.9	2.7	5.4	0.7	4.3	5.3	2.4	4.6	7.5
ProRata	January 20, 2015	25.5	**33.5**	5.0	3.5	6.0	0.5	5.5	7.0	2.0	4.5	7.0
Pulse RC	January 20, 2015	27.0	**31.0**	5.5	3.0	5.5		5.0	6.0	2.5	3.5	11.0
Rass	January 20, 2015	27.0	**31.2**	4.0	3.1	4.5		5.5	6.3	2.2	5.2	11.0
E-Voice	January 20, 2015	23.2	**26.1**	4.0	3.4	4.8		4.7	4.8	2.3	5.0	21.7
Alco	January 20, 2015	27.1	**32.0**	4.0	3.0	4.6	1.0	4.1	5.6	2.0	2.9	13.7
GPO	January 19, 2015	26.4	**30.4**	5.1	3.0	5.2	1.0	4.8	5.2	2.5	3.0	12.4
PAMAK	January 18, 2015	27.0	**33.5**	4.5	3.0	5.5	0.5	5.5	7.5	1.5	3.5	8.0
Metrisi	January 18, 2015	30.2	**32.4**	4.4	2.2	5.1	0.7	4.4	5.6	2.5	4.8	7.7
E-Voice	January 17, 2015	23.2	**25.8**	3.4	3.2	4.9		4.3	4.2	2.1	5.0	23.8
Alco	January 17, 2015	27.3	**31.7**	4.1	3.2	4.8		4.1	5.1	2.2	2.8	14.7
ToThePoint	January 15, 2015	25.4	**28.7**	5.4	2.5	5.5		5.4	5.8	1.9	2.3	17.1
Rass	January 15, 2015	25.8	**29.6**	4.2	3.5	5.0		5.2	6.1	2.1	3.9	14.6
Interview	January 15, 2015	28.1	**30.0**	3.5	1.8	4.9	0.7	4.0	5.0	2.0	5.2	14.8
Kapa Research	January 15, 2015	28.1	**31.2**	5.0	2.7	4.7		4.9	5.4	2.7	3.6	11.7
Metron Analysis	January 15, 2015	24.7	**28.3**	3.4	2.4	4.3		4.1	5.7	2.2	5.0	19.9
Pulse RC	January 14, 2015	27.0	**30.0**	5.5	3.0	5.5		4.5	6.0	2.5	3.5	12.5
AUEB-STAT	January 14, 2015	26.4	**30.9**	5.9	3.5	5.1		5.4	6.2	2.9	6.0	7.6
Metrisi	January 13, 2015	28.7	**30.9**	4.2	2.1	4.7	1.1	4.5	5.5	2.8	5.7	9.8
Alco	January 13, 2015	27.8	**31.2**	3.6	2.6	5.0		4.0	5.1	2.4	4.1	14.2
Rass	January 12, 2015	27.2	**30.2**	3.6	2.7	4.8		4.4	5.8	2.3	3.8	15.2
PAMAK	January 12, 2015	27.0	**31.5**	3.0	3.0	6.0	0.5	6.0	6.5	2.0	5.5	9.0
Interview	January 11, 2015	26.4	**28.3**	4.1	1.7	5.1	0.2	4.1	5.5	2.0	5.6	17.0
Data RC	January 9, 2015	23.3	**27.8**	3.3	2.1	4.1		4.7	5.6	2.1	5.9	21.0
Alco	January 9, 2015	28.0	**31.2**	4.0	2.2	4.2		3.7	4.5	2.4	4.4	15.4
Metrisi	January 9, 2015	27.8	**30.2**	4.8	2.2	5.2	1.2	4.6	5.1	2.9	3.9	12.1
Pulse RC	January 9, 2015	26.0	**29.5**	5.5	3.0	5.5		4.5	5.5	2.5	4.0	14.0
E-Voice	January 8, 2015	22.8	**25.5**	3.2	1.4	3.8		4.3	4.2	1.6	6.5	**26.7**
Kapa Research	January 8, 2015	25.5	**28.1**	5.2	2.6	5.4		5.0	6.5	2.8	4.1	14.8
Rass	January 8, 2015	27.1	**29.8**	3.4	2.5	5.2		4.8	5.0	2.2	4.0	16.0
MRB	January 8, 2015	25.1	**28.1**	4.6	2.6	4.5	0.9	4.8	5.7	2.4	4.8	16.5
Metron Analysis	January 8, 2015	23.8	**27.1**	3.2	2.8	4.5		4.2	6.7	2.2	5.1	20.4
Marc	January 8, 2015	26.4	**29.6**	3.8	2.7	5.5		5.0	5.6	2.6	6.0	12.8
GPO	January 7, 2015	25.3	**28.5**	5.0	2.7	5.4		5.7	5.8	2.6	5.0	14.0
ProRata	January 7, 2015	25.5	**31.0**	3.0	2.0	4.5		5.5	5.5	1.5	4.0	17.5
Pulse RC	January 6, 2015	25.5	**29.0**	5.5	3.0	5.5		5.0	5.5	2.5	4.0	14.5
Interview	January 6, 2015	25.1	**27.1**	3.6	1.7	5.7	0.2	4.6	6.3	2.1	6.0	17.6
Alco	January 6, 2015	28.6	**31.6**	3.6	2.2	4.1		3.8	4.2	2.5	3.2	16.2
E-Voice	January 2, 2015	24.3	**27.5**	3.5	2.7	4.3		4.4	5.5		8.5	19.3
Interview	December 31, 2014	25.1	**27.4**	4.9	2.0	5.0	0.7	5.0	5.0		7.2	17.7
Rass	December 30, 2014	27.3	**30.4**	3.5	2.5	3.8		4.8	4.7		5.2	17.8
PAMAK	December 30, 2014	25.0	**29.5**	4.0	2.0	6.0	0.5	5.0	5.0		8.0	15.0
Marc	December 28, 2014	25.1	**28.1**	4.6	3.0	5.9	1.0	5.4	6.1		7.7	13.1
Interview	December 27, 2014	24.6	**27.0**	5.4	2.0	5.7	0.6	5.5	4.6		9.0	15.6
Kapa Research	December 24, 2014	24.7	**27.2**	6.1	2.5	5.5		5.8	5.8		4.0	18.4
Marc	December 23, 2014	24.8	**28.3**	4.5	3.3	5.7	1.2	5.3	5.8		9.9	11.2
Alco	December 21, 2014	25.0	**28.3**	4.6	3.0	5.2		4.2	4.4		6.2	19.1
Pulse RC	December 21, 2014	25.0	**28.5**	6.5	3.5	5.5		5.0	5.5		5.5	15.0
PatrisNews	December 21, 2014	22.6	**29.9**	8.1	3.9	10.0	0.9	4.3	4.9		8.2	7.2
Interview	December 20, 2014	25.0	**27.5**	5.1	1.8	4.5	0.9	5.2	4.5		8.0	17.5
Rass	December 18, 2014	23.7	**27.1**	4.6	2.8	4.4		5.3	5.8		7.3	19.0
Marc	December 17, 2014	24.9	**28.5**	4.8	3.0	5.8	1.4	5.6	5.6		8.2	12.2
PAMAK	December 17, 2014	24.5	**31.0**	5.0	3.0	6.0	0.5	5.0	6.5		6.5	12.0
Interview	December 15, 2014	25.2	**27.9**	5.1	1.8	4.8	0.9	5.0	4.2		8.2	16.9
GPO	December 15, 2014	23.1	**28.0**	5.1	2.7	5.0		5.5	5.1		8.5	17.0
VCitizens	December 14, 2014	20.1	**23.3**	3.1	2.4	6.1	1.0	4.9	4.2	0.5	3.6	**30.8**
Pulse RC	December 13, 2014	24.0	**27.5**	7.0	3.5	6.0		5.0	5.5		6.0	15.5
MRB	December 13, 2014	21.0	**24.2**	5.5	2.8	4.5	1.5	5.0	5.7		8.4	21.4
Interview	December 12, 2014	25.6	**28.6**	5.5	2.2	3.9	1.3	4.6	4.1		8.2	16.0
Alco	December 12, 2014	24.0	**27.6**	5.0	2.9	5.6		4.4	4.1		5.7	20.7
Kapa Research	December 11, 2014	22.7	**25.5**	6.7	2.7	5.9		5.8	6.0		4.5	20.2
Interview	December 10, 2014	25.2	**28.3**	4.7	1.7	4.3	0.7	5.5	4.5		7.8	17.3
ProRata	December 10, 2014	21.5	**28.5**	4.5	2.5	5.0	0.5	5.0	5.5		6.5	20.5
Metron Analysis	December 10, 2014	21.1	**24.2**	4.3	2.5	4.1		4.1	6.8		6.5	**26.4**
MRB	December 10, 2014	20.3	**24.3**	5.2	3.0	5.0	1.2	5.1	6.0		8.4	21.5
Alco	December 9, 2014	23.2	**28.0**	4.7	3.3	5.4		4.3	4.3		5.3	21.5
Pulse RC	December 6, 2014	22.0	**27.0**	6.5	3.5	6.0	1.0	5.5	6.0		5.0	17.5
Interview	December 5, 2014	25.5	**28.6**	5.5	2.2	3.9	1.4	4.6	4.1		8.2	16.0
Metron Analysis	December 3, 2014	19.8	**24.3**	3.8	2.7	5.0		4.0	6.9		4.8	**28.7**
Pulse RC	November 29, 2014	23.0	**27.5**	7.0	3.5	6.0	1.0	5.5	6.5		5.0	15.0
Metron Analysis	November 26, 2014	20.5	**24.0**	4.6	2.7	4.5		4.8	5.5		6.1	**27.3**
PAMAK	November 24, 2014	20.0	**27.5**	3.5	3.0	6.5	1.0	5.5	6.0		10.0	17.0
Pulse RC	November 22, 2014	22.0	**27.0**	7.0	3.5	6.5	1.0	6.0	6.0		6.0	15.0
Kapa Research	November 19, 2014	22.2	**25.8**	6.8	3.2	6.1		5.9	6.6		4.6	18.8
Metron Analysis	November 19, 2014	18.6	**23.3**	3.7	2.8	3.5		4.4	5.9		8.6	**29.2**
MRB	November 19, 2014	19.6	**23.9**	4.0	3.1	4.9	1.1	5.0	7.5		8.9	22.0
Metron Analysis	November 12, 2014	18.4	**21.7**	3.7	2.6	4.0	1.1	4.2	6.9		6.8	**30.6**
Interview	November 6, 2014	25.9	**28.8**	5.1	3.0	3.5	1.3	4.5	5.0		9.3	13.6
Metron Analysis	November 5, 2014	19.9	**24.5**	3.8	3.6	4.5		4.0	7.7		6.9	**25.1**
Rass	October 31, 2014	21.1	**26.4**	4.1	3.0	5.1	1.0	5.4	5.8		6.8	21.3
Metrisi	October 30, 2014	24.1	**27.2**	5.3	2.3	6.4	0.9	5.4	5.5		8.0	14.9
Alco	October 23, 2014	23.5	**27.9**	4.0	2.9	5.4		4.3	4.5		6.3	21.2
Pulse RC	October 21, 2014	22.0	**27.0**	6.5	3.0	7.0	1.5	5.5	6.0		5.0	16.5
Metron Analysis	October 15, 2014	18.8	**23.7**	3.4	3.4	4.5		4.9	6.1		7.2	**28.0**
Kapa Research	October 15, 2014	23.5	**27.4**	5.8	3.8	6.4	1.1	5.3	5.6		6.4	14.7
PAMAK	October 15, 2014	20.0	**27.5**	4.0	2.5	6.5	0.5	5.5	7.5		9.0	17.0
GPO	October 13, 2014	20.2	**26.7**	4.0	3.0	5.7		5.7	6.0		8.4	20.3
Metrisi	October 10, 2014	23.6	**26.7**	5.3	2.4	6.7	0.9	5.3	4.5		6.6	18.2
Metron Analysis	October 8, 2014	19.8	**25.7**	3.4	2.5	5.3	1.0	4.0	6.9		6.7	24.7
AUEB-STAT	October 4, 2014	21.5	**31.0**	6.2	3.0	9.5	0.7	5.8	6.7		6.4	9.2
E-Voice	October 2, 2014	17.5	**21.2**	3.9	2.0	5.3	0.8	4.4	4.6		9.4	**30.9**
Rass	September 18, 2014	22.0	**25.8**	4.2	3.2	6.7	1.0	5.5	4.7		6.0	20.9
MRB	September 18, 2014	19.9	**23.6**	4.2	3.2	6.7	1.0	5.1	5.6		9.3	21.4
Alco	September 18, 2014	22.2	**26.0**	4.3	3.1	6.2	1.7	4.4	4.3		6.3	21.5
PAMAK	September 15, 2014	18.0	**24.0**	5.5	3.0	6.5	1.0	5.5	5.5		10.0	21.0
Metron Analysis	September 10, 2014	20.4	**23.0**	4.6	3.0	5.3		5.6	4.8		7.7	**25.6**
E-Voice	September 4, 2014	17.7	**20.2**	4.8	2.4	7.1	1.3	6.5	3.9		6.8	**29.3**
Alco	September 3, 2014	21.7	**25.3**	4.3	3.5	7.3	2.3	4.6	3.7		5.3	22.0
Pulse RC	July 16, 2014	21.0	**24.0**	7.0	3.5	9.0	1.5	5.5	7.0		6.5	15.0
MRB	July 4, 2014	19.8	**21.5**	6.3	3.8	8.5	1.3	5.1	6.7		7.1	19.9
Alco	May 22, 2014	20.8	**24.2**	5.3	3.3	7.7	1.8	4.8	5.8		6.9	19.4
Kapa Research	May 18, 2014	22.7	**27.4**	6.2	4.0	8.7	1.4	6.4	8.1		7.3	7.8
Alco	May 14, 2014	22.0	**23.4**	5.1	4.6	7.3	2.4	5.0	7.2		6.3	16.7
GPO	May 12, 2014	**24.5**	23.1	5.9	4.0	6.9	2.8	7.2	7.0		5.2	13.4
Kapa Research	May 8, 2014	21.7	**23.0**	5.5	4.1	7.6	2.1	6.4	9.0		7.7	12.9
Metron Analysis	April 30, 2014	**22.3**	21.1	4.6	3.6	5.7	1.9	4.7	8.4		4.2	**23.5**
Alco	April 25, 2014	**22.2**	21.5	4.9	3.6	6.7	2.5	4.7	5.3		6.2	**22.4**
MRB	April 11, 2014	**21.8**	20.8	4.9	4.1	8.1	2.8	6.0	8.2		5.7	17.6
Pulse RC	April 9, 2014	20.0	**21.0**	6.0	4.0	10.0	2.0	6.0	8.0		6.0	17.0
GPO	April 7, 2014	**22.1**	21.2	5.8	4.3	6.8	3.0	6.8	8.5		3.6	17.9
PAMAK	April 4, 2014	17.0	**19.5**	4.5	3.5	7.5	2.0	7.0	9.0		9.0	**21.0**
Kapa Research	April 3, 2014	20.8	**21.5**	4.6	4.0	7.7	1.7	6.2	8.5		5.6	19.4
Metron Analysis	April 3, 2014	18.4	**19.5**	4.3	2.7	5.8	2.3	4.5	10.4		5.5	**26.6**
Kapa Research	April 2, 2014	**21.7**	19.6	5.4	3.9	6.9	2.1	5.8	9.2		6.5	18.9
Alco	March 27, 2014	**18.9**	18.5	4.8	3.9	7.2	2.4	6.8	8.2		4.6	**24.7**
Pulse RC	March 18, 2014	19.5	**21.0**	5.5	4.0	10.0	2.0	5.5	6.5		6.0	20.0
Alco	March 13, 2014	18.0	**19.1**	5.1	4.5	6.9	2.2	5.0	8.8		6.6	**23.8**
PAMAK	March 12, 2014	13.5	**18.5**	4.5	1.5	9.0	2.0	8.0	13.0		9.0	**21.0**
Alco	March 4, 2014	20.0	**20.9**	3.8	4.0	6.9	2.8	5.2	5.7		6.7	**24.0**
Metron Analysis	February 26, 2014	19.8	**20.3**	4.5	4.1	6.8	3.2	6.0			4.8	**30.5**
Alco	February 11, 2014	20.0	**21.4**	4.0	4.9	7.4	3.0	5.4			7.6	**26.3**
GPO	February 10, 2014	20.2	**21.4**	5.6	4.4	7.2	3.8	6.1			7.4	**23.9**
Marc	February 5, 2014	21.1	**23.3**	5.2	4.6	7.8	4.3	5.2			6.7	21.8
Metrisi	February 5, 2014	20.1	**20.4**	4.0	4.5	8.5	2.6	4.8			3.8	**31.3**
Alco	January 24, 2014	21.6	**22.2**	4.7	4.3	7.7	3.2	4.6			8.2	**23.5**
Metron Analysis	January 22, 2014	19.7	**20.5**	4.3	3.2	6.9	2.5	3.4			6.9	**32.7**
Pulse RC	January 21, 2014	20.0	**23.0**	5.5	4.5	11.0	2.5	5.0			8.0	20.5
Kapa Research	December 19, 2013	21.7	**22.5**	5.6	4.0	7.5	2.8	5.3			7.3	**23.3**
Rass	December 19, 2013	23.7	**24.1**	4.5	4.7	6.1	3.4	6.3			7.1	20.1
Pulse RC	December 18, 2013	20.0	**22.5**	5.5	4.5	11.5	3.0	5.5			7.5	20.0
MRB	December 11, 2013	21.0	**21.9**	4.7	4.8	8.9	3.1	5.0			5.8	**24.8**
Metron Analysis	December 8, 2013	20.0	**21.2**	4.5	4.8	7.2	2.7	3.8			6.0	**29.8**
Pulse RC	December 3, 2013	20.0	**23.0**	6.5	4.0	11.5	2.5	6.0			6.5	20.0
GPO	November 30, 2013	20.0	**20.4**	5.8	5.2	8.4	4.0	5.9			6.5	**23.8**
Kapa Research	November 28, 2013	**23.0**	22.4	6.1	4.5	7.9	3.4	5.0			7.3	20.4
Metrisi	November 28, 2013	**21.5**	20.6	4.3	4.1	6.1	1.6	4.9			6.3	**30.6**
Marc	November 25, 2013	21.8	**23.2**	5.0	5.2	6.9	4.5	5.1			6.5	21.8
Metron Analysis	November 20, 2013	19.7	**20.2**	4.0	4.0	6.7	2.5	4.0			6.5	**32.5**
Alco	November 15, 2013	22.1	**22.5**	5.1	5.3	8.8	3.4	4.2			8.1	20.5
Rass	November 14, 2013	**24.2**	22.6	4.6	4.8	6.2	3.1	5.8			6.9	21.8
Pulse RC	November 12, 2013	21.5	**22.0**	6.5	4.5	10.5	3.0	5.0			7.5	19.5
Metron Analysis	October 16, 2013	**20.2**	19.2	4.7	4.2	5.1	2.4	4.0			6.8	**33.4**
Metrisi	October 16, 2013	**21.9**	20.7	5.1	4.7	5.7	1.9	5.1			7.2	**27.7**
Pulse RC	October 16, 2013	21.0	**22.0**	6.5	4.5	9.5	3.0	5.5			7.5	20.5
Alco	October 14, 2013	**21.2**	20.5	6.1	5.1	6.8	3.7	4.9			9.6	**22.1**
Rass	October 10, 2013	**24.1**	22.8	5.0	4.8	6.3	3.0	5.2			6.6	22.2
GPO	October 7, 2013	**21.0**	20.5	6.0	4.5	7.8	4.2	6.0			6.4	**23.6**
Marc	October 7, 2013	**22.7**	22.5	5.3	5.2	7.1	4.6	4.9			7.2	20.5
MRB	October 3, 2013	**21.8**	21.2	5.2	4.8	6.9	3.6	5.0			8.0	**23.5**
Alco	October 3, 2013	**22.8**	21.9	6.2	5.0	6.4	3.9	4.7			6.5	22.6
Alco	September 26, 2013	**21.5**	20.3	5.9	5.4	6.7	3.5	4.7			6.7	**25.3**
MRB	September 26, 2013	**22.2**	21.0	5.5	5.3	6.8	3.3	5.0			7.4	**23.5**
Alco	September 23, 2013	**21.0**	19.2	6.0	5.0	6.8	3.6	4.9			8.6	**24.9**
Rass	September 21, 2013	**25.4**	22.7	5.3	4.3	5.8	2.5	5.7			6.0	22.3
Metron Analysis	September 19, 2013	19.6	**19.8**	4.8	3.6	7.8	3.2	4.6			5.6	**31.0**
Metrisi	September 12, 2013	**21.2**	20.7	5.4	5.1	10.8	2.2	5.2			6.4	**23.0**
Rass	September 12, 2013	**24.6**	23.8	4.7	4.8	8.3	2.4	4.5			6.4	20.5
Pulse RC	September 10, 2013	19.0	**20.5**	7.0	4.0	13.5	3.0	5.0			6.0	**22.0**
Metron Analysis	August 28, 2013	**19.4**	19.3	4.6	3.3	7.8	2.0	4.6			5.7	**33.4**
Kapa Research	July 18, 2013	**23.2**	22.8	7.3	4.5	9.7	2.8	4.9			5.0	19.8
Pulse RC	July 13, 2013	19.0	**21.0**	6.5	4.0	13.0	3.0	5.5			6.5	**21.5**
Metron Analysis	July 10, 2013	**19.7**	19.5	4.9	3.7	8.9	2.1	3.7			5.2	**32.2**
Alco	June 27, 2013	**20.9**	19.4	6.5	4.6	10.8	3.0	4.5			7.2	**23.1**
MRB	June 25, 2013	**22.0**	20.8	6.1	5.5	9.1	3.0	5.1			6.7	21.7
MRB	June 21, 2013	**21.5**	21.2	5.1	5.2	9.9	3.5	5.3			6.4	**21.9**
Rass	June 20, 2013	**24.8**	23.7	4.0	4.1	8.1	3.0	4.7			8.3	19.3
Metrisi	June 17, 2013	**21.0**	20.5	5.1	5.2	10.2	4.8	5.7			4.5	**23.1**
Metron Analysis	June 13, 2013	**20.2**	20.0	4.7	4.5	8.1	4.6	3.6			5.9	**28.4**
Kapa Research	June 13, 2013	**21.4**	21.1	6.3	4.4	9.5	3.9	5.1			6.5	**21.8**
MRB	June 6, 2013	**22.1**	20.3	5.1	5.5	10.6	4.9	4.6			6.2	20.7
Pulse RC	June 4, 2013	**20.0**	19.5	6.0	4.0	13.0	3.5	5.5			7.0	**21.5**
GPO	May 27, 2013	**21.3**	19.5	6.7	6.4	10.1	5.1	5.8			6.5	18.6
Rass	May 24, 2013	**24.5**	22.1	4.7	4.8	9.2	3.8	4.6			6.4	19.9
Alco	May 24, 2013	**21.5**	19.1	5.0	4.5	9.5	3.5	4.4			10.2	**22.3**
Metrisi	May 19, 2013	**21.4**	20.4	4.2	5.6	10.0	4.5	4.6			7.6	**21.7**
Marc	May 13, 2013	**21.6**	20.7	4.8	5.6	9.4	4.0	4.5			8.8	20.6
AUEB-STAT	May 12, 2013	**21.6**	21.4	6.3	4.2	12.4	5.1	6.2			8.9	14.0
Alco	April 26, 2013	**20.5**	19.9	5.5	5.0	9.3	3.7	4.9			8.6	**22.6**
Metron Analysis	April 17, 2013	**18.7**	18.1	5.5	6.6	7.4	3.9	3.8			5.2	**30.8**
Metrisi	April 13, 2013	21.1	**21.5**	6.2	5.5	9.2	5.6	5.4			4.1	21.3
Marc	April 13, 2013	22.1	**22.3**	5.4	5.9	9.7	4.4	5.1			6.0	19.1
Pulse RC	April 9, 2013	19.5	**20.0**	7.0	5.0	12.0	3.5	5.0			5.5	**22.5**
GPO	April 1, 2013	**20.3**	**20.3**	7.5	6.3	9.0	5.0	5.8			4.1	**21.7**
Alco	March 29, 2013	**20.7**	20.1	6.6	6.3	9.2	4.1	5.4			5.8	**21.8**
MRB	March 28, 2013	**21.9**	21.5	5.5	6.1	9.0	5.4	4.6			5.5	20.5
Marc	March 28, 2013	23.0	**23.1**	5.7	5.8	9.5	4.5	4.9			6.3	17.2
Kapa Research	March 21, 2013	21.7	**22.4**	7.4	4.8	11.0	4.0	5.4			5.9	17.4
Metron Analysis	March 20, 2013	17.0	**17.3**	6.0	5.7	7.9	4.2	3.7			5.5	**32.7**
Metrisi	March 15, 2013	**22.2**	21.9	7.2	4.6	9.3	3.9	5.0			4.2	21.7
Marc	March 15, 2013	22.6	**23.4**	5.6	5.4	9.7	4.7	4.4			6.7	17.5
Marc	February 22, 2013	22.8	**23.1**	5.3	5.3	10.0	4.4	4.5			6.0	18.6
Alco	February 19, 2013	20.0	**20.4**	6.9	5.1	10.4	4.1	4.7			7.3	**21.1**
Metron Analysis	February 14, 2013	19.5	**20.4**	5.6	4.6	8.5	4.1	4.8			6.6	**26.1**
Pulse RC	February 13, 2013	20.0	**21.5**	7.0	5.0	12.0	4.0	6.0			5.0	19.5
Alco	February 12, 2013	**21.2**	20.2	7.2	5.0	9.4	4.0	4.8			5.3	**22.9**
GPO	February 4, 2013	**21.1**	20.8	7.4	5.2	10.0	4.8	5.0			3.9	**21.8**
Pulse RC	January 24, 2013	20.0	**21.5**	6.5	5.0	12.0	4.0	5.0			5.5	20.5
Rass	January 24, 2013	**25.5**	25.1	5.3	4.8	8.8	5.2	5.0			5.5	14.8
Alco	January 24, 2013	**22.1**	20.8	7.6	5.9	8.6	4.3	4.6			4.9	**24.0**
MRB	January 24, 2013	**23.1**	22.0	5.5	4.9	9.2	4.4	4.3			5.6	21.0
Kapa Research	January 24, 2013	**22.9**	21.2	7.2	4.6	10.5	4.8	5.5			6.4	16.9
Marc	January 21, 2013	**22.5**	22.3	5.7	5.6	9.7	4.6	4.3			5.2	20.1
Metron Analysis	January 17, 2013	18.7	**18.8**	5.2	4.3	7.2	3.8	3.6			5.6	**32.8**
Kapa Research	December 21, 2012	21.5	**22.6**	6.2	3.8	9.8	5.0	5.2			9.0	16.9
Rass	December 20, 2012	24.8	**25.5**	5.7	2.8	9.1	5.0	4.8			6.4	15.9
Marc	December 19, 2012	21.5	**22.7**	5.6	5.4	9.6	4.5	4.7			5.7	20.3
Alco	December 14, 2012	20.7	**22.3**	5.3	4.5	10.2	4.1	4.3			5.5	**23.9**
MRB	December 6, 2012	20.1	**22.1**	6.0	5.5	9.3	4.4	4.2			5.5	**22.9**
Metron Analysis	December 3, 2012	19.8	**22.0**	5.0	6.0	9.0	4.5	4.1			4.3	**25.5**
Marc	November 26, 2012	20.8	**23.0**	5.1	5.7	9.8	4.8	4.5			5.7	20.6
Pulse RC	November 23, 2012	19.0	**23.5**	6.0	6.5	12.0	3.5	5.0			5.5	19.0
GPO	November 17, 2012	20.1	**22.3**	7.5	6.5	10.3	5.0	4.6			4.4	19.3
Kapa Research	November 8, 2012	20.4	**23.1**	7.5	6.4	10.4	4.6	5.7			7.1	14.8
Pulse RC	October 30, 2012	20.0	**23.0**	6.5	6.5	11.5	4.0	5.0			6.0	17.5
Marc	October 23, 2012	21.3	**23.2**	6.0	5.5	9.6	4.9	4.8			5.4	19.3
Rass	October 17, 2012	22.7	**23.8**	7.2	6.1	9.2	5.0	4.5			6.8	14.7
MRB	September 20, 2012	**22.9**	22.4	7.9	5.0	9.0	4.2	4.0			4.5	20.1
Rass	September 20, 2012	**24.2**	23.1	8.2	6.3	9.3	5.2	4.6			5.5	13.6
Metron Analysis	September 19, 2012	19.6	**20.8**	7.3	5.4	8.8	4.8	3.9			4.5	**24.9**
Pulse RC	September 4, 2012	**22.5**	21.5	7.5	6.0	9.5	4.0	4.5			6.5	18.0
Alco	August 31, 2012	**21.5**	19.8	8.0	5.9	7.5	4.5	4.1			6.1	**22.6**
Kapa Research	July 12, 2012	**23.6**	20.7	11.1	6.4	7.4	5.7	4.8			5.3	15.0
MRB	July 12, 2012	**23.5**	21.7	10.1	6.3	6.1	5.1	4.1			4.6	18.5
