= Nikolaos Karathanasopoulos =

Greek politician (born 1963)

Member of the Hellenic Parliament for Achaia
- Incumbent
- Assumed office 2007

Personal details
- Born: 25 March 1963 (age 63) Athens, Kingdom of Greece
- Party: Communist Party of Greece

Nikolaos Karathanasopoulos (born 25 March 1963), is a Greek politician. He has served as a member of the Hellenic Parliament since 2007, representing Achaia for the Communist Party of Greece

== Background ==
Karathanasopoulos is an economist by profession. He is fluent in Italian. He is a member of the Central Leadership of the Economic Chamber of Greece.
