= January 2015 Greek parliamentary election =

- 25 January 2015

All 300 seats in the Hellenic Parliament 151 seats needed for a majority
- Opinion polls
- Registered: 9,949,684
- Turnout: 63.62% (▲1.13pp)
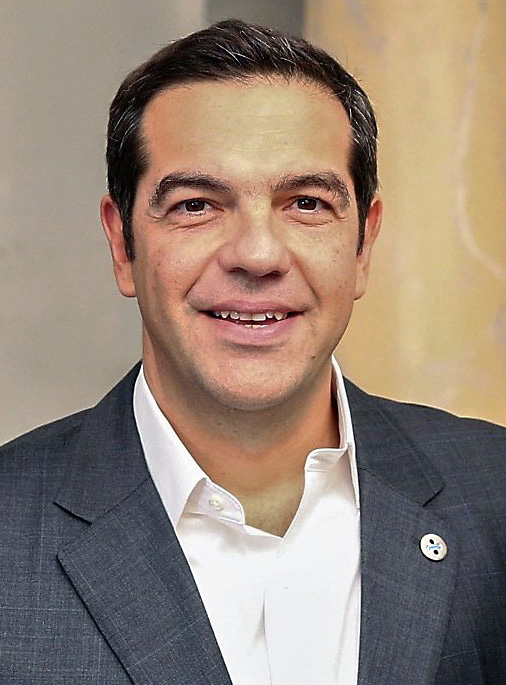

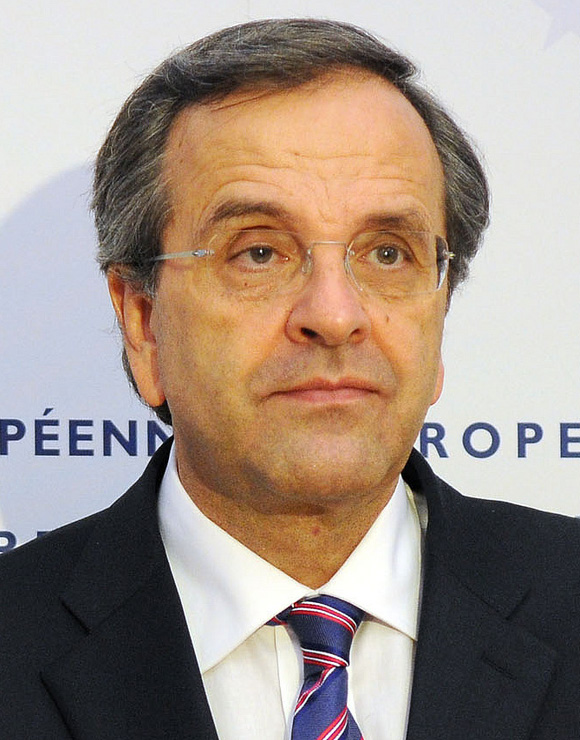

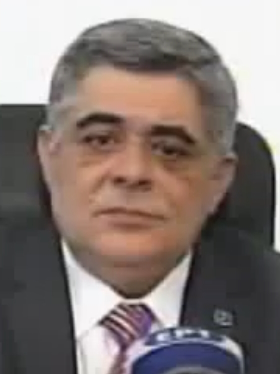

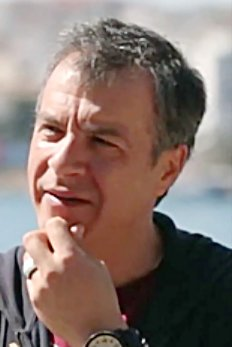

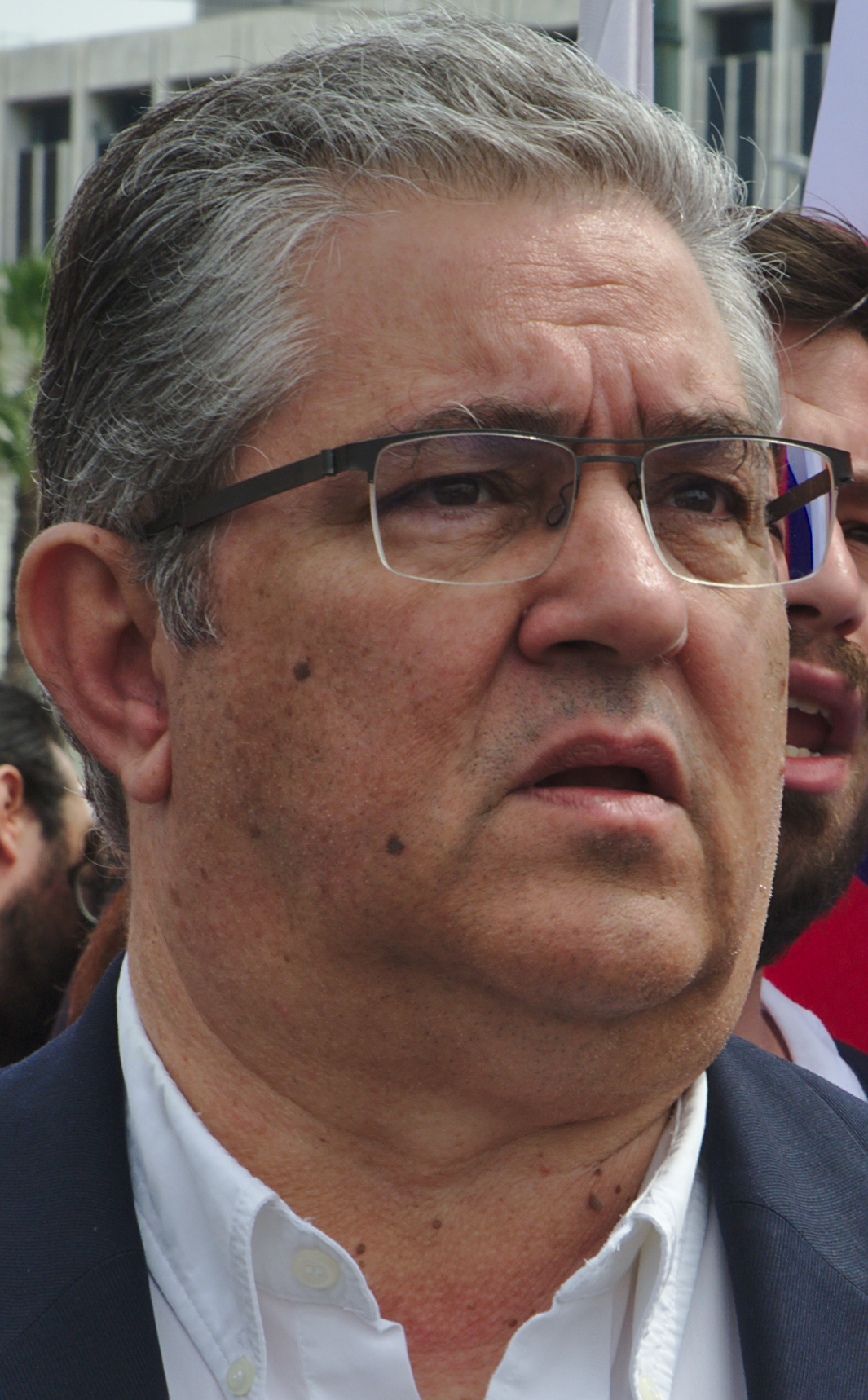

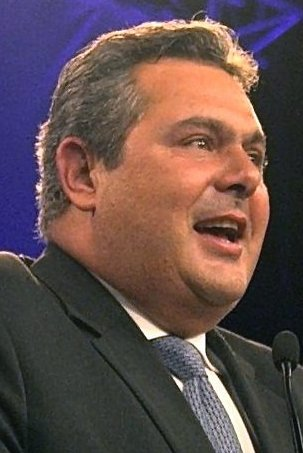

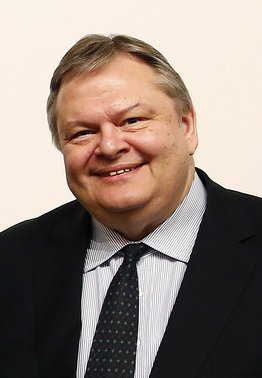
	First party	Second party	Third party
Leader	Alexis Tsipras	Antonis Samaras	Nikolaos Michaloliakos
Party	Syriza	ND	ΧΑ
Last election	26.89%, 71 seats	29.66%, 129 seats	6.92%, 18 seats
Seats won	149	76	17
Seat change	▲78	▼53	▼1
Popular vote	2,245,978	1,718,694	388,387
Percentage	36.34%	27.81%	6.28%
Swing	▲9.45pp	▼1.85pp	▼0.64pp
	Fourth party	Fifth party	Sixth party
Leader	Stavros Theodorakis	Dimitris Koutsoumpas	Panos Kammenos
Party	To Potami	KKE	ANEL
Last election	–	4.50%, 12 seats	7.51%, 20 seats
Seats won	17	15	13
Seat change	New	▲3	▼7
Popular vote	373,924	338,188	293,683
Percentage	6.05%	5.47%	4.75%
Swing	New	▲0.97pp	▼2.76pp
	Seventh party
Leader	Evangelos Venizelos
Party	PASOK
Last election	12.28%, 33 seats
Seats won	13
Seat change	▼20
Popular vote	289,469
Percentage	4.68%
Swing	▼7.60pp
- Results by constituency
Prime Minister before election
Antonis Samaras
ND
Prime Minister after election
Alexis Tsipras
Syriza

Parliamentary elections were held in Greece on 25 January 2015 to elect all 300 members of the Hellenic Parliament in accordance with the constitution. The election was held earlier than scheduled due to the failure of the Greek parliament to elect a new president on 29 December 2014.

Syriza won a parliamentary election for the first time, winning 36% of votes and 149 seats, just two short of an absolute majority. The centre-right New Democracy (ND), the outgoing party of government, saw only a small decline from 30% to 28%, but in falling to second place suffered its worst showing to date in terms of seats. Five other parties passed the 3% electoral threshold to gain representation, all winning 5–6% of votes: the far-right Golden Dawn (XA), the social-liberal To Potami, the Communist Party of Greece (KKE), the right-wing populist Independent Greeks (ANEL), and the centre-left PASOK. XA became the third largest party for the first time, while Potami debuted in fourth place. Formerly one of Greece's two major parties, PASOK collapsed even further to become the smallest party in Parliament, winning just 4.7% of votes and 13 seats.

Syriza was in a clear position to lead a new government, winning close to a majority thanks to the majority bonus system. Though they had been expected to seek an agreement with Potami, Syriza instead formed a coalition with the right-wing, anti-austerity ANEL on 26 January. Syriza leader Alexis Tsipras subsequently became Prime Minister.

== Background ==
Greece suffered three distinct economic recessions in the turmoil of the 2008 financial crisis (Q3-Q4 2007, Q2-2008 until Q1-2009, and Q3-2009 until Q4-2013), with private markets becoming inaccessible as a lending source since May 2010 (due to a debt-to-GDP ratio exceeding 146%), leaving the state to choose between conditional bailout funding from the Troika (Eurogroup, IMF, and ECB) or a sovereign default along with being forced to leave the eurozone. The outgoing government chose to accept the offered conditional bailout funding, outlining a certain level of economic reforms, privatization and austerity to be achieved throughout the programme period from May 2010 until March 2016. In return, Greece was scheduled to receive €245.6 billion of long-term bailout loans (with an interest rate moratorium until 2020). The country was also rewarded by private creditors accepting a debt restructuring deal that cut the debt burden of the state by €127.1 billion in 2012 while also transforming the remaining debt pile from short-term bonds with high interest rates to long-term bonds with low interest rates.

The incumbent government was formed after the June 2012 election by New Democracy, PASOK and Democratic Left (DIMAR). Antonis Samaras of New Democracy was Prime Minister. PASOK and DIMAR declined to participate in Samaras' cabinet, which was thus composed of New Democracy members and independents. By April 2013, the government held 167 seats, down from 179 elected in the 2012 election. Of those, nine were expelled for voting against austerity packages, and three left voluntarily.

On 21 June 2013 DIMAR chose to withdraw from the governing coalition in protest at the unilateral closure of the state-owned Hellenic Broadcasting Corporation (ERT) ten days earlier, an action opposed by both DIMAR and PASOK. and incriminated by Greece's highest administrative court, the Council of State. DIMAR's withdrawal left the government with a slim three-seat majority of 153 seats. Antonis Manitakis, the Minister of Administrative Reform, and Antonis Roupakiotis, the Minister of Justice, both independents, also submitted their resignation to the government.

DIMAR said that while they would still work with the government on a case-by-case basis, following another election the party could also work with a SYRIZA-led government.

=== Third bailout package ===
In an interview with Bild on 10 February 2014, Samaras insisted that Greece did not need a new bailout, despite reports in Germany that the Greek Finance Ministry was working on a plan for one. The German Finance Ministry estimated that a third bailout (if established) would have a size between 10 and 20 billion euros.

Both of the latest bailout programme audit reports, released independently by the European Commission and IMF in June 2014, revealed that after transfer of the scheduled bailout funds and full implementation of the agreed adjustment package in 2012, there would be a forecast financing gap of €5.6 billion in 2014, €12.3 billion in 2015 and €0bn in 2016. The new forecast financing gaps, were needed either to be covered by the government's additional lending from private capital markets - or a third additional bailout loan, but could alternatively also be countered by additional fiscal improvements through expenditure reductions, revenue hikes or increased amount of privatizations. Due to an improved outlook for the Greek economy, with achievement of a sustained government structural surplus since 2012 - along with both a decline of the unemployment rate and return of positive real GDP growth in 2014, it was possible for the Greek government to return to the bond market during the course of 2014 - for the purpose to fully fund its new extra financing gaps by additional private capital. A total of €6.1bn was raised from the sale of three-year and five-year bonds in 2014, and the outgoing ND led government planned to cover its forecast financing gap for 2015 by a continued additional sale of seven-year and ten-year bonds in 2015.

During the second half of 2014, the Greek government again negotiated with the Troika. The negotiations were this time about how to comply with the programme requirements, to ensure activation of the payment of its last scheduled eurozone bailout tranche in December 2014, and about a potential update of its remaining bailout programme for 2015–16. When calculating the impact of the 2015 fiscal budget presented by the Greek government, there were a disagreement, with the calculations of the Greek government showing it fully complied with the goals of its agreed "Midterm fiscal plan 2013–16", while the Troika calculations were less optimistic and concluded that a financing gap of €2.5bn existed (which would have to be covered by additional austerity measures). As the Greek government insisted its calculations were more accurate than those presented by the Troika, it submitted an unchanged fiscal budget bill to the parliament, which was passed by 155 against 134 votes on 7 December. The Eurogroup met on 8 December and agreed to support a technical two-month extension of the part of the Greek bailout programme under its guidance, making time both for completion of the long-awaited fifth final programme review and assessing the possibility for the European Stability Mechanism to set up a precautionary Enhanced Conditions Credit Line (ECCL) (Note: The ECCL instrument is often used as a follow-up precautionary measure, when a state has exited its sovereign bailout programme, functioning as an extra backup guarantee mechanism with transfers only taking place if adverse financial/economic circumstances materialize, but with the positive effect that its sole existence help calm down financial markets - making it more safe for investors to buy government bonds - and hereby it will aid the attempt for the government to raise funding capital from the private capital market.) in place by 1 March 2015. As part of the review of the bailout programme, the outgoing ND led government had proposed to the Troika, immediately to end the previously agreed and continuing IMF bailout programme for 2015–16, replacing it with the transfer of €11bn unused bank recapitalization funds currently held as reserve by Hellenic Financial Stability Fund (HFSF) (funds in excess from the part of the bailout programme under the guidance of the eurozone), along with establishment of the precautionary ECCL. In December, the Troika announced it was willing to accept this plan by the Greek government of an early exit from the bailout programme accompanied by setting up an precautionary ECCL, conditional the fifth review of the existing bailout programme first had found Greece in full compliance with its terms.

The election scene is expected to take place between pro- and anti-bailout parties. The parties being pro-bailout (ND, Pasok and Potami) argues there is no viable alternative compared to respecting and completing the existing bailout programme under the guidance of the eurozone - so that it can be exited and replaced by a precautionary ECCL on 1 March 2015. While the anti-bailout left-wing Coalition of the Radical Left (SYRIZA) party, argues it will be better to tear apart the existing bailout programme - followed by an attempt to negotiate a new creditor agreement with better terms for Greece.

=== Presidential election ===
On 8 December 2014 Samaras announced that the presidential election would be brought forward by a few months. The first round of voting was held on 17 December, the second on 23 December and the third on 29 December. On 9 December 2014, Samaras had announced the candidacy of ND politician Stavros Dimas, jointly supported by the ruling ND–PASOK coalition, for the presidency.

In the event of no super-majority after the third ballot the Greek Constitution requires the Parliament to be dissolved within ten days of the vote and snap elections to be called. As the ND–PASOK coalition did not have enough seats in Parliament to ensure the election of a President by itself, there was a high possibility of an impasse on the choice, requiring a snap election.

On 29 December 2014, after failing to elect a presidential candidate in the third round of voting with the required 180 votes, prime minister Samaras asked incumbent president Karolos Papoulias to dissolve the parliament. On 31 December, Papoulias formally dissolved the parliament by decree and set the new election to be held on 25 January and the new parliament to reconvene on 5 February 2015.

=== Financial market reaction to the call of a premature election ===
The snap parliamentary elections called because of political opposition in the Greek parliament to elect a new Greek president, threatened to endanger the recently gained Greek recovery, according to several international economic analysts. The rising political uncertainty also caused the Troika to suspend all scheduled remaining financial aid to Greece under its bailout programme, while noting its support would only resume pending the formation of a new-elect government respecting the already negotiated conditions. Opinion polls ahead of the election provided the anti-bailout party Syriza - which announced it would not comply with the previously negotiated terms in the bailout agreement and demand a "write down on most of the nominal value of debt, so that it becomes sustainable" - with a lead, causing adverse developments on financial markets, with the Athens Stock Exchange suffering an accumulated loss of roughly 30% since the start of December 2014, and the interest rate of the ten-year government bond rising from a low of 5.6% in September 2014 to 10.6% on 7 January 2015. According to the ECB Executive Board member from France, "It is illegal and contrary to the treaty to reschedule a debt of a state held by a central bank", meaning such a thing would be incompatible with continued membership of the eurozone. However, the risk of a Greek withdrawal from the eurozone as a result of the upcoming elections were assessed by economists from Commerzbank only to be around 25%, assuming the election would end with the same result as measured by the opinion polls in early January.

== Electoral system ==
9,808,760 registered voters were called up to vote, as voting in Greece is mandatory. However, none of the legally existing penalties or sanctions have ever been enforced. Rigid restrictions required citizens to cast the ballot in the specific voting district they have been registered to. Combined with the absence of absentee ballots, early voting procedures or voting procedures for expatriate Greeks, many Greeks simply couldn't afford travelling to "their" voting district. With the rising number of expatriates, the turnout was expected to be below the turnout of the 2012 elections.

250 seats were distributed on the basis of proportional representation, with a threshold of 3% required for entry into parliament. Blank and invalid votes, as well as votes cast for parties that fall short of the 3% threshold, are disregarded for seat allocation purposes. 50 additional seats were awarded as a majority bonus to the party that wins a plurality of votes, with coalitions in that regard not being counted as an overall party but having their votes counted separately for each party in the coalition, according to the election law. Parliamentary majority is achieved by a party or coalition of parties that command at least one half plus one (151 out of 300) of total seats.

== Opinion polls ==
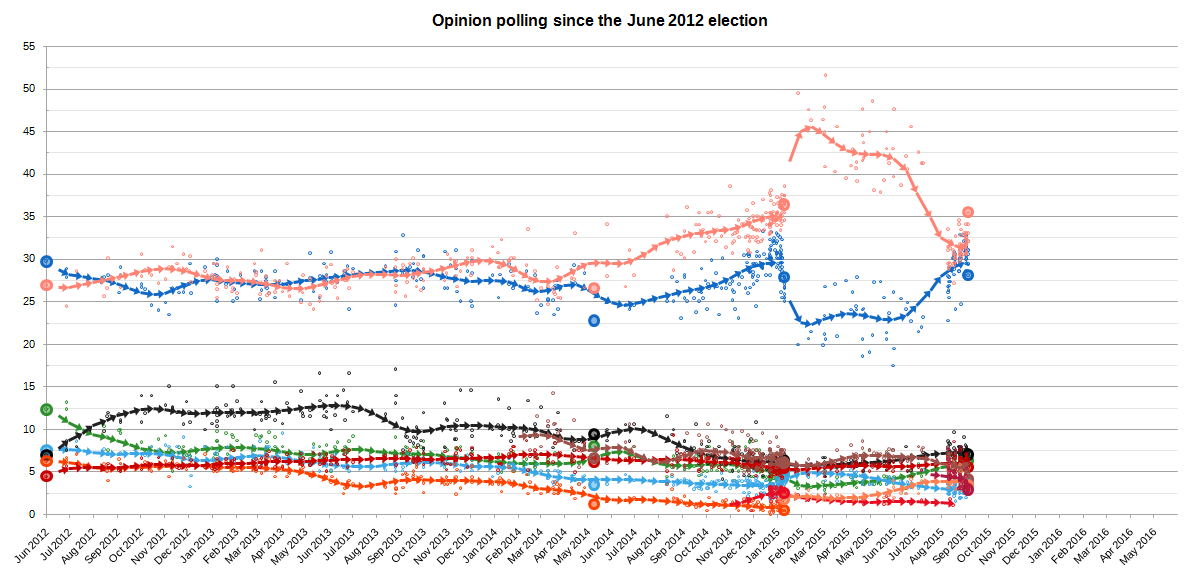
Graph of polling from the June 2012 election to the January 2015 election, showing 15-day average trend lines

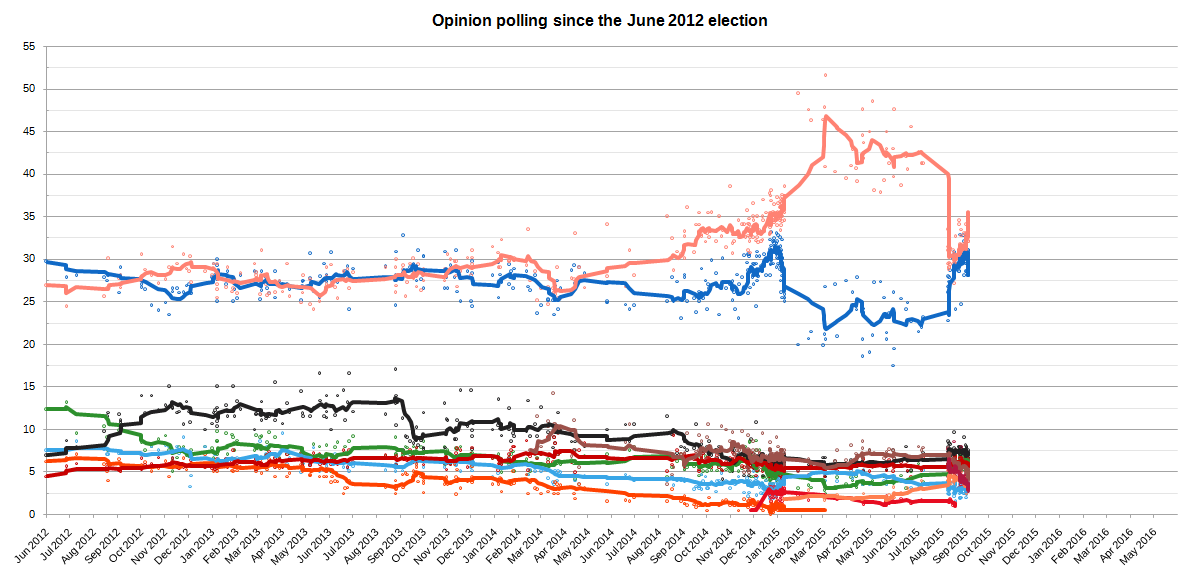
Graph of polling from the June 2012 election to the January 2015 election, showing 8-poll moving average trend lines

== Outgoing parliament ==
Distribution of seats in parliament 2012−2015
Party	17 Jun 2012 (Election)	31 Dec 2014 (Dissolution)	6 Jan 2015 (Pre-election) (Note: After dissolution, a number of MPs changed their party allegiance as a consequence of various events. This is how the parliament would have looked on the hypothesis that it had not been dissolved until election day.)
New Democracy (ND)	129 / 300	127 / 300	131 / 300
Coalition of the Radical Left (SYRIZA)	71 / 300	71 / 300	71 / 300
PASOK	33 / 300	28 / 300	22 / 300
Independent Greeks (ANEL)	20 / 300	12 / 300	12 / 300
Golden Dawn (ΧΑ)	18 / 300	16 / 300	16 / 300
Democratic Left (DIMAR)	17 / 300	9 / 300	8 / 300
Communist Party of Greece (KKE)	12 / 300	12 / 300	12 / 300
Independent Democratic MPs (ADIV)	0 / 300	17 / 300	13 / 300
River (Potami)	0 / 300	3 / 300	3 / 300
Movement of Democratic Socialists (KIDISO)	0 / 300	0 / 300	6 / 300
Independents	0 / 300	5 / 300	6 / 300

== Results ==
Results, showing the seats won by each party in each electoral district.

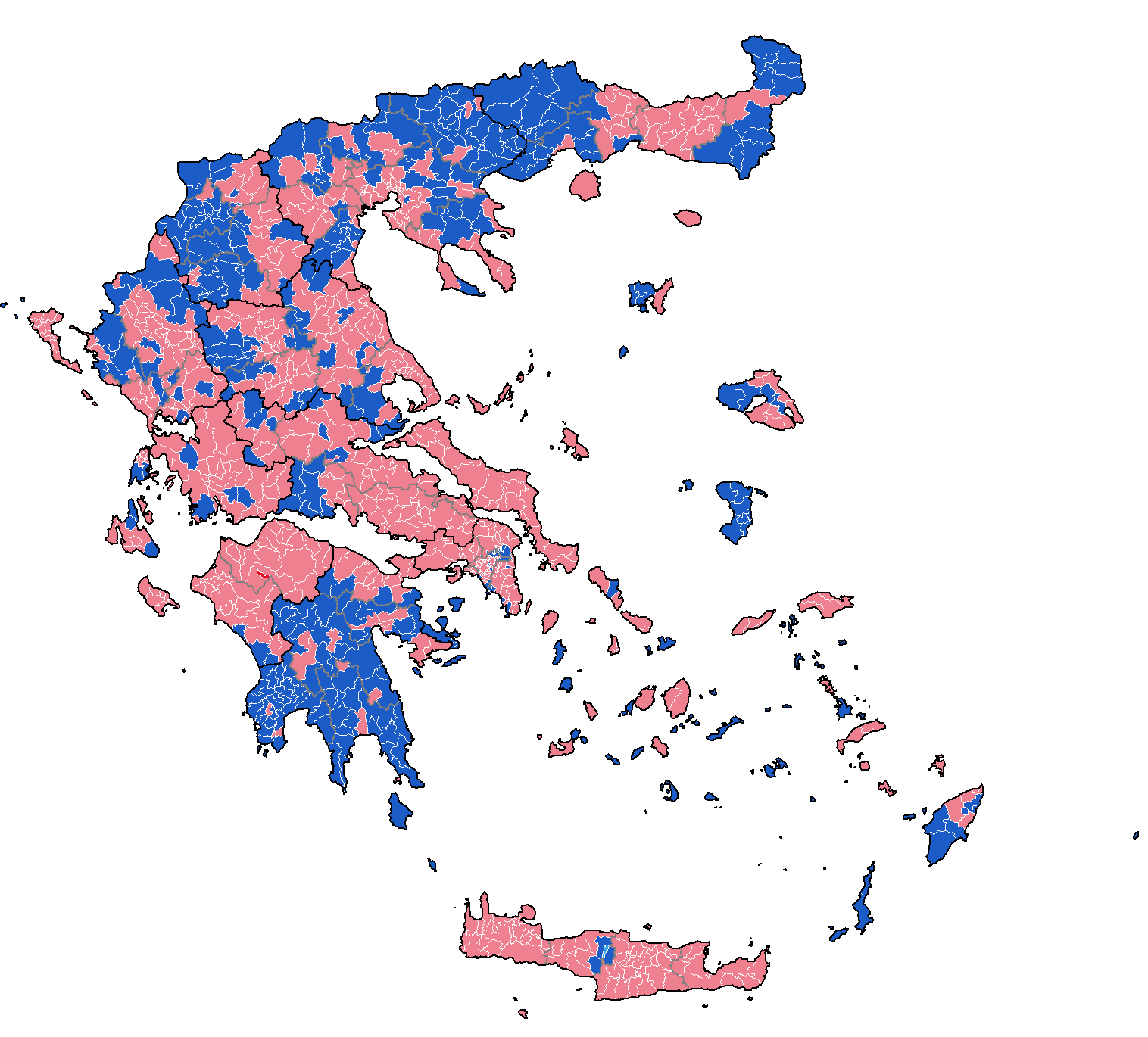
Results, showing the winning party in each municipal unit. SYRIZA (644) ND (377) ANEL (2) KIDISO (1)

Party	Votes	%	+/–	Seats	+/–
Syriza	2,245,978	36.34	+8.57	149	+78
New Democracy	1,718,694	27.81	–1.85	76	–53
Popular Association–Golden Dawn	388,387	6.28	–0.64	17	–1
The River	373,924	6.05	New	17	New
Communist Party of Greece	338,188	5.47	+0.97	15	+3
Independent Greeks	293,683	4.75	–2.76	13	–7
PASOK	289,469	4.68	–7.60	13	–20
Movement of Democratic Socialists	152,557	2.47	New	0	New
Union of Centrists	110,923	1.79	+1.50	0	0
Teleia	109,500	1.77	New	0	New
Popular Orthodox Rally	63,669	1.03	–0.55	0	0
Antarsya–MARS	39,497	0.64	+0.32	0	0
Democratic Left–Greens	29,820	0.48	–5.77	0	–17
Marxist–Leninist Communist Parties (KKE (m–l)/M–L KKE)	7,999	0.13	+0.01	0	0
Democratic National Reform Union	7,615	0.12	New	0	New
Greek People's Democratic Liberation	4,740	0.08	New	0	New
Workers Revolutionary Party	2,363	0.04	New	0	New
Organisation of Internationalist Communists	1,854	0.03	New	0	New
National Resistance Movement	618	0.01	+0.01	0	0
Greek White Movement of Today's Ideology	76	0.00	New	0	New
Radical Orthodox Solidarity Front	16	0.00	New	0	New
Panagrarian Labour Movement of Greece	1	0.00	±0.00	0	0
Independents	1,301	0.02	+0.01	0	0
Total	6,180,872	100.00	–	300	0
Valid votes	6,180,872	97.64			
Invalid/blank votes	149,484	2.36			
Total votes	6,330,356	100.00			
Registered voters/turnout	9,949,684	63.62			
Source: Ministry of Interior

=== By constituency ===
Constituency	SYRIZA		ND		XA		River		KKE		ANEL		PASOK		KIDISO		EK		Teleia	
Constituency	%	±	%	±	%	±	%	±	%	±	%	±	%	±	%	±	%	±	%	±
Achaea	43.07	▲10.90	20.59	▼5.07	4.82	▼1.11	5.33	New	5.51	▲1.15	5.85	▼0.88	3.89	▼9.60	5.87	New	1.25	▲1.03	1.52	New
Aetolia-Akarnania	36.52	▲11.26	29.21	▼3.44	6.42	▼1.17	4.13	New	5.66	▲0.74	3.31	▼1.99	6.05	▼8.85	4.81	New	0.83	▲0.66	1.23	New
Argolis	32.29	▲10.80	33.76	▼2.51	7.32	▼2.12	5.02	New	3.59	▲0.51	2.91	▼2.62	6.65	▼7.79	3.19	New	1.06	▲0.84	1.80	New
Arkadia	30.13	▲7.19	36.13	▲1.49	5.83	▼1.50	4.95	New	4.35	▲0.63	2.65	▼3.07	8.20	▼6.30	3.11	New	1.08	▲0.85	1.23	New
Arta	44.14	▲14.99	30.04	▼5.79	3.76	▼0.67	3.37	New	5.11	▲0.25	2.49	▼2.37	5.27	▼7.56	2.60	New	0.73	▲0.57	0.75	New
Athens A	33.61	▲6.65	30.07	▼0.85	7.05	▼0.76	7.23	New	6.04	▲1.30	4.40	▼1.91	3.47	▼5.25	2.19	New	1.68	▲1.37	1.38	New
Athens B	37.09	▲5.66	25.66	▼0.56	5.73	▼0.65	7.67	New	6.93	▲1.57	4.90	▼2.48	3.40	▼5.14	2.07	New	1.78	▲1.48	1.80	New
Attica	37.09	▲6.90	25.91	▼0.54	8.44	▼1.52	6.12	New	5.36	▲1.27	5.93	▼3.57	3.01	▼4.69	1.61	New	1.40	▲1.14	2.44	New
Boeotia	41.55	▲10.89	22.69	▼1.64	6.65	▼2.12	4.57	New	6.96	▲2.27	4.83	▼3.53	4.22	▼7.30	2.50	New	1.06	▲0.81	2.22	New
Cephalonia	38.25	▲7.51	28.92	▼1.26	6.05	▼1.54	3.89	New	9.34	▲0.57	3.67	▼2.20	4.44	▼5.71	1.43	New	1.00	▲0.79	0.87	New
Chalkidiki	33.51	▲11.03	33.00	▼1.90	6.24	▲0.04	4.54	New	3.23	▲0.52	5.21	▼3.56	7.19	▼7.45	0.97	New	2.63	▲2.36	1.32	New
Chania	43.07	▲9.30	19.81	▼0.62	4.29	▼1.19	12.16	New	4.80	▲1.04	5.75	▼2.62	2.87	▼10.90	2.09	New	1.19	▲1.03	1.35	New
Chios	27.11	▲8.68	38.89	▲4.74	4.69	▼0.36	6.32	New	5.53	▲1.51	2.43	▼3.34	6.83	▼12.19	2.56	New	1.24	▲1.05	1.52	New
Corfu	44.91	▲10.70	21.89	▼2.48	5.70	▼0.86	4.83	New	6.93	▼0.13	5.56	▼1.42	3.88	▼6.67	2.35	New	1.19	▲0.94	0.93	New
Corinthia	36.77	▲12.10	29.83	▼1.18	7.29	▼2.70	5.52	New	2.95	▲0.78	4.13	▼2.78	4.58	▼9.63	2.66	New	1.68	▲1.47	2.02	New
Cyclades	35.12	▲8.45	31.59	▲0.98	5.07	▼0.45	6.76	New	4.15	▲1.26	4.99	▼4.65	4.89	▼6.56	1.96	New	1.54	▲1.29	1.77	New
Dodecanese	33.26	▲10.38	32.59	▲0.21	5.53	▼0.44	4.86	New	3.34	▲0.70	5.32	▼4.23	7.78	▼8.90	2.27	New	1.41	▲1.25	1.75	New
Drama	26.69	▲9.26	34.51	▼1.30	5.99	▲0.15	8.34	New	3.04	▲0.81	5.05	▼5.00	7.26	▼9.51	1.89	New	2.43	▲2.08	1.88	New
Elis	37.89	▲11.68	26.90	▼3.55	6.04	▼1.57	3.80	New	4.17	▲0.67	3.75	▼2.29	8.14	▼8.41	4.83	New	0.72	▲0.54	1.63	New
Euboea	40.51	▲10.69	23.70	▼0.94	6.96	▼1.59	5.27	New	4.98	▲0.90	5.13	▼4.15	5.31	▼6.75	2.40	New	1.21	▲0.92	2.34	New
Evros	26.69	▲11.78	37.08	▼2.74	7.50	▲0.76	5.36	New	3.26	▲0.61	5.32	▼2.78	6.55	▼11.11	2.21	New	1.73	▲1.38	1.59	New
Evrytania	37.13	▲16.43	32.70	▼6.12	4.38	▼0.94	6.99	New	2.90	▲0.66	3.22	▼1.96	4.32	▼13.65	3.96	New	1.01	▲0.84	1.27	New
Florina	36.29	▲12.57	35.02	▲1.04	5.01	▼0.65	3.56	New	3.76	▲0.08	3.94	▼2.95	4.77	▼11.21	1.97	New	1.38	▲1.15	1.61	New
Grevena	31.48	▲12.96	33.16	▼2.23	5.83	▲0.49	3.81	New	6.73	▲0.69	2.62	▼1.96	8.12	▼11.22	3.47	New	1.21	▲1.00	1.22	New
Heraklion	47.85	▲14.24	18.53	▼1.52	2.81	▼0.64	7.87	New	3.89	▲0.91	4.37	▼3.64	5.91	▼12.70	5.09	New	1.00	▲0.84	1.12	New
Imathia	33.94	▲10.31	28.87	▼1.29	7.48	▼0.44	5.01	New	4.92	▲0.63	5.38	▼3.42	5.27	▼9.59	1.87	New	2.52	▲2.20	2.08	New
Ioannina	39.57	▲12.42	28.23	▼4.13	4.34	▼0.25	5.49	New	5.54	▲0.63	3.16	▼1.93	5.59	▼8.48	3.19	New	1.20	▲1.03	1.07	New
Karditsa	38.91	▲13.87	30.02	▼4.43	6.42	▼0.17	3.60	New	6.01	▲0.25	3.34	▼2.01	5.12	▼8.40	2.35	New	0.83	▲0.59	1.60	New
Kastoria	27.08	▲9.63	38.78	▼0.34	7.67	▲0.11	5.24	New	3.63	▲1.30	4.08	▼5.93	4.84	▼9.29	2.96	New	2.00	▲1.76	1.50	New
Kavala	31.27	▲10.12	31.21	▼3.38	7.11	▲0.46	5.54	New	4.27	▲0.78	5.87	▼2.48	6.12	▼8.74	1.68	New	2.57	▲2.23	1.84	New
Kilkis	29.40	▲10.38	33.01	▼3.13	8.60	▲0.81	3.69	New	5.94	▲0.36	4.14	▼2.97	6.77	▼7.50	1.43	New	2.66	▲2.24	1.45	New
Kozani	33.11	▲9.78	28.13	▼3.59	5.29	▼0.66	5.75	New	5.24	▲0.83	6.73	▼1.92	6.47	▼7.91	2.54	New	2.08	▲1.77	1.76	New
Laconia	26.51	▲9.04	35.79	▼5.20	10.47	▼0.40	3.66	New	3.96	▲0.42	2.74	▼2.07	11.00	▼3.60	2.06	New	0.71	▲0.56	1.13	New
Larissa	36.14	▲11.02	27.15	▼3.32	6.45	▼0.05	5.74	New	6.93	▲0.69	4.32	▼2.80	4.49	▼8.28	2.61	New	1.40	▲1.16	2.30	New
Lasithi	43.50	▲16.43	24.84	▼1.92	2.81	▲0.22	8.03	New	2.91	▲0.82	3.15	▼3.13	6.49	▼17.33	4.85	New	0.92	▲0.74	1.01	New
Lefkada	36.00	▲9.18	28.89	▼2.28	4.68	▼1.41	4.42	New	9.54	▲0.99	3.57	▼0.99	4.99	▼6.78	3.13	New	0.98	▲0.81	1.03	New
Lesbos	32.94	▲9.83	30.39	▲2.64	4.66	▼0.61	4.26	New	10.81	▲0.06	5.30	▼2.67	5.12	▼9.04	1.86	New	0.93	▲0.76	1.19	New
Magnesia	40.28	▲9.59	24.97	▼2.81	6.90	▼0.53	4.43	New	5.63	▲0.83	5.27	▼2.87	3.76	▼5.82	1.81	New	1.31	▲1.05	3.48	New
Messenia	31.76	▲10.21	37.96	▼3.63	7.20	▼0.56	4.05	New	4.94	▲0.81	2.68	▼1.43	4.29	▼7.36	2.68	New	0.95	▲0.74	1.06	New
Pella	32.12	▲13.76	34.02	▼1.83	7.56	▼0.21	4.51	New	3.49	▲0.74	3.71	▼3.84	5.80	▼11.38	1.85	New	2.66	▲2.28	1.57	New
Phocis	34.77	▲11.72	31.76	▼1.84	6.55	▼0.50	4.12	New	5.93	▲0.97	4.02	▼3.64	5.00	▼7.47	2.76	New	0.99	▲0.79	2.02	New
Phthiotis	35.73	▲11.27	29.09	▼4.20	6.24	▼1.40	3.97	New	4.25	▲0.88	6.07	▼1.36	3.58	▼10.09	3.41	New	0.94	▲0.71	4.12	New
Pieria	30.01	▲11.43	34.07	▼1.78	7.82	▲0.84	3.87	New	4.25	▲0.76	5.56	▼3.17	4.94	▼10.05	2.62	New	2.47	▲2.17	1.97	New
Piraeus A	34.40	▲6.25	29.60	▼0.08	7.44	▼0.79	6.36	New	5.27	▲1.34	5.33	▼3.49	3.35	▼5.09	1.70	New	1.84	▲1.50	2.00	New
Piraeus B	42.06	▲5.75	18.97	▲0.34	7.80	▼1.48	5.53	New	8.18	▲1.61	5.56	▼3.79	3.13	▼4.81	1.48	New	1.77	▲1.39	2.63	New
Preveza	37.94	▲11.71	31.77	▼2.34	4.63	▼0.92	4.34	New	6.19	▲0.75	2.76	▼1.99	5.46	▼9.35	3.07	New	0.80	▲0.68	1.03	New
Rethymno	39.55	▲11.32	24.73	▲0.63	3.11	▼1.02	9.46	New	3.21	▲0.81	4.58	▼2.27	6.05	▼15.72	4.57	New	0.96	▲0.85	0.90	New
Rhodope	48.53	▲28.78	20.56	▼6.72	4.89	▲0.70	12.70	New	1.84	▼0.09	2.68	▼1.59	3.33	▼17.21	2.33	New	0.81	▲0.58	0.75	New
Samos	36.17	▲10.67	24.85	▲0.24	5.54	▼0.39	3.95	New	15.08	▼3.21	3.65	▼2.03	4.07	▼6.72	2.00	New	1.14	▲0.95	1.04	New
Serres	26.24	▲9.90	37.44	▼2.70	6.43	▼0.70	5.71	New	3.78	▲0.60	5.50	▼2.18	6.20	▼8.70	1.74	New	2.14	▲1.82	1.62	New
Thesprotia	35.90	▲12.58	37.61	▲3.38	3.68	▼1.59	4.31	New	3.76	▲0.33	2.43	▼2.93	5.46	▼12.04	3.19	New	0.81	▲0.61	0.64	New
Thessaloniki A	34.12	▲7.17	24.84	▼2.91	7.07	▲0.29	7.00	New	5.61	▲1.11	5.58	▼3.34	4.12	▼6.11	1.33	New	5.12	▲4.61	1.94	New
Thessaloniki B	31.64	▲8.24	29.22	▼2.69	7.91	▲0.16	6.00	New	5.04	▲0.94	5.89	▼3.27	4.29	▼6.83	1.16	New	4.05	▲3.65	1.90	New
Trikala	36.16	▲13.32	32.60	▼0.87	4.64	▼0.92	4.06	New	6.77	▲0.52	3.04	▼2.54	4.06	▼10.59	3.52	New	1.09	▲0.88	1.69	New
Xanthi	45.43	▲6.87	23.56	▼2.92	4.79	▼0.10	4.51	New	2.39	▼0.96	4.06	▼3.07	6.45	▼3.29	3.94	New	1.31	▲1.02	1.24	New
Zakynthos	42.99	▲8.25	24.00	▼4.34	4.79	▼0.75	7.52	New	8.67	▲1.11	2.73	▼1.36	3.92	▼7.81	2.01	New	0.61	▲0.50	0.90	New
