= KTEL =

KTEL may refer to:

- K-tel, company known for their "as seen on TV" "greatest hits" records and CDs
- KTEL-CD, a low-power television station (channel 15, virtual channel 15) licensed to Albuquerque, New Mexico, United States
- KTEL-TV, a television station (channel 25) licensed to Carlsbad, New Mexico, United States
- KTEL (AM), a radio station (1490 AM) licensed to Walla Walla, Washington, United States
- KTEL, a form of bus operating company in Greece
- Perry County Municipal Airport (ICAO code KTEL)
