= 2006 Greek local elections =

The 2006 Greek local elections elected representatives to Greece's 3 super-prefectures, 54 prefectures, provinces, and approximately 1,033 communities and municipalities.

The elections took place on Sunday, 15 October 2006 from 7 a.m. to 7 p.m.

According to the New Code for Municipalities and Communities, a platform gains the absolute majority of the seats if it has more than 42% of the votes. If no platform achieves that, then there is a second round, one week later. The ballot in the second round includes the two platforms which garnered the most votes in the 1st week.

Traditionally, candidates at local elections do not run under the official name of the party they belong, but form electoral platforms with different names for the purpose.

== Elections ==
=== Municipal mayoralties ===
==== Municipality of Athens ====
Candidate	Supporting parties	Platform	1st Round	%	Seats
Nikitas Kaklamanis	New Democracy/ Popular Orthodox Rally		126,877	46.05	27
Kostas Skandalidis	Panhellenic Socialist Movement		79,463	28.84	11
Alexis Tsipras	Coalition of the Radical Left / Communist Organization of Greece		28,964	10.51	4
Spyros Halvatzis	Communist Party of Greece/ Democratic Social Movement/ Communist Renewal/ Intervention of Left Citizens		24,169	8.77	3
Dimosthenis Vergis	Greek Ecologists		3,935	1.43	0
Tasos Krommydas	Ecologist Greens		3,822	1.39	0
Dimitrios Zaphiropoulos	Patriotic Alliance		3,705	1.34	0
Aggelos Hagios	Radical Left Front/ Communist Party of Greece (Marxist-Leninist)		3,107	1.13	0
Emmanouil Kalligiannis	Liberal Party		1,458	0.53	0
No. of valid votes			275,500	100.00	45
Invalid votes			21,504		
Total			297,004 (57.77%)		

==== Municipality of Piraeus ====
Candidate	Supporting parties	Platform	1st Round	%	Seats
Panagiotis Fasoulas	Panhellenic Socialist Movement		44,936	45.17	25
Christos Agrapidis	New Democracy		32,562	32.02	10
Thodoris Dritsas	Coalition of the Radical Left/ Ecologist Greens		6,540	6.43	2
Elpida Pantelaki	Communist Party of Greece		6,231	6.13	2
Panagiotis Melas	Popular Orthodox Rally		5,698	5.60	1
Nikolaos Legakis			3,478	3.42	1
Antonis Tsiknas	Radical Left Front/ Communist Party of Greece (Marxist-Leninist)		1,246	1.23	0
No. of valid votes			101,691	100.00	41
Invalid votes			6.936		
Total			108.627 (64.20%)		

==== Municipality of Thessaloniki ====
Candidate	Supporting parties	Platform	1st Round	%	Seats	2nd Round	%	Seats
Vassilios Papageorgopoulos	New Democracy	Thessaloniki; Renewal	68,319	41.43	9	72,696	52.62	16 (25)
Chrysa Arapoglou	Panhellenic Socialist Movement		35,623	21.60	5	65,455	47.38	4 (9)
Yannis Boutaris	Ecologist Greens	Initiative for Thessaloniki	26,334	15.97	3			
Georgios Karatzaferis	Popular Orthodox Rally		12,371	7.50	2			
Agapios Sahinis	Communist Party of Greece		12,249	7.43	1			
Tassos Kourakis	Coalition of the Radical Left		8,349	5.06	1			
Thannasis Agapitos	Radical Left Front/ Communist Party of Greece (Marxist-Leninist)		1,657	1.00	0			
No. of valid votes			164,902	100.00	21	138,151	100.00	20 (41)
Invalid votes			12,624			14,213		
Total			177,526 (72.30%)			152,364 (62.03%)		

=== Super-Prefectural elections ===
==== Athens-Piraeus ====
Candidate	Supporting parties	Platform	1st Round	%	Seats
Fofi Gennimata	Panhellenic Socialist Movement		647,027	43.39	46
Argyris Dinopoulos	New Democracy		504,104	33.81	18
George Mavrikos	Communist Party of Greece/ Democratic Social Movement/ Communist Renewal/ Intervention of Left Citizens		157,633	10.57	6
Yannis Panousis	Coalition of the Left of Movements and Ecology		85,162	5.71	2
Evangelos Papadopoulos	Popular Orthodox Rally		57,299	3.84	2
Thanasses Tsirigotis	M-L KKE		19,974	1.34	0
Kostas Spanopoulos	Socialist Workers' Party		19,857	1.33	0
No. of valid votes			1,491,092	100.00	74
Invalid votes			147,815		
Total			1,638,907 (69.23%)		

==== Drama-Kavala-Xanthi ====
Candidate	Supporting parties	Platform	1st Round	%	Seats
Constantine Tatsis	New Democracy		141,142	56.31	45
Gülbeyaz Karahasan	Panhellenic Socialist Movement		83,195	33.19	27
Dimitris Fotiadis	Communist Party of Greece/ Democratic Social Movement/ Communist Renewal/ Intervention of Left Citizens		11,740	4.68	3
Dimitris Kollatos	Popular Orthodox Rally		8,160	3.26	0
Dimitris Proedrou	Coalition of the Left of Movements and Ecology		6,426	2.56	0
No. of valid votes			250,663	100.00	75
Invalid votes			15,521		
Total			266,184 (70.74%)		

==== Evros-Rhodope ====
Candidate	Supporting parties	Platform	1st Round	%	Seats
Georgios Minopoulos	Panhellenic Socialist Movement		90,004	49.97	30
Stefanos Spasis	New Democracy		74,297	41.25	20
Georgios Botrotsos	Communist Party of Greece		7,260	4.03	0
Stavros Tsagkos	Coalition of the Left of Movements and Ecology		4,450	2.47	0
Kiriakos Kozaris	Popular Orthodox Rally		4,097	2.27	0
No. of valid votes			180,108	100.00	50
Invalid votes			10,417		
Total			190,525 (67.30)%)		

=== Prefectural elections ===
==== Athens Prefecture ====
Candidate	Supporting parties	Platform	Seats
Yiannis Sgouros	Panhellenic Socialist Movement		
Fotini Pipili	New Democracy		
Spyros Likoudis	Coalition of the Left of Movements and Ecology		
Adonis Georgiadis	Popular Orthodox Rally		
Hristos Katsikas	M-L KKE		
Niki Argiri	Socialist Workers' Party		

Note: There was no separate election for the position of prefect (nomarch); the nomarchs was appointed according to the results of the election in the super-prefecture.)

==== Piraeus Prefecture ====
Candidate	Supporting parties	Platform	Seats
Yiannis Michas	Panhellenic Socialist Movement		
Spiros Spyridon	New Democracy		
Evi Karakosta	Coalition of the Left of Movements and Ecology		
Panagiotis Theodorakidis	Popular Orthodox Rally		
Antonis Fotiadis	M-L KKE		
Yannis Sifakakis	Socialist Workers' Party		

Note: There was no separate election for the position of prefect (nomarch); the nomarchs was appointed according to the results of the election in the super-prefecture.)

==== Thessaloniki Prefecture ====
Candidate	Supporting parties	Platform	1st Round	%	Seats
Panagiotis Psomiadis	New Democracy	Power for the Prefecture	269,349	48.20	23
Voula Patoulidou	Panhellenic Socialist Movement	For Thessaloniki - Voula Patoulidou / Together for the Prefecture	171,345	30.66	9
Yiannis Ziogas	Communist Party of Greece		32,706	5.85	2
Michalis Tremopoulos	Ecologist Greens/ Socialist Workers' Party	Ecology - Solidarity	25,661	4.59	2
Stratis Plomaritis	Coalition of the Left of Movements and Ecology		19,385	3.47	1
Dimitrios Tsipidis	Popular Orthodox Rally		15,017	2.69	0
Marianna Brekasi	Communist Organization of Greece	Left Perfectural Movement of Thessaloniki	12,859	2.30	0
Harilaos Papageorgiou	Independent		12,481	2.23	0
No. of valid votes			558,805	100.00	37
Invalid votes			45,006		
Total			603,811 (79.79%)		
