= Endorsements in the 2015 Greek bailout referendum =

During the 2015 Greek bailout referendum a number of newspapers, individuals, politicians, political parties and organisations in Greece, Europe and internationally issued endorsements for either 'NO' to accepting the Troika bailout terms or 'YES'.

== Politicians ==
=== No ===
- Alexis Tsipras, then prime minister of Greece and leader of the SYRIZA party
- Jeremy Corbyn, Leader of the British Labour Party
- Tom Copley, Labour Party member of the London Assembly
- Diane Abbott, British Labour Party MP and candidate for Mayor of London
- Bernie Sanders, U.S. Senator and candidate for President of the United States

=== Yes ===
- Giorgos Kaminis, mayor of Athens
- Yiannis Boutaris, mayor of Thessaloniki
- Andy Burnham, British Labour Party politician and mayor of Manchester
- Jean-Claude Juncker, President of the European Commission
- Martin Schulz, German MEP and President of the European Parliament
- Antonis Samaras, Former Prime Minister of Greece and then leader of the New Democracy Party
- Kostas Karamanlis, Former Prime Minister of Greece and former leader of the New Democracy Party
- Angela Merkel, Chancellor of Germany

== Individuals ==
=== No ===
- Thomas Piketty, French economist
- George Galloway, British politician and broadcaster
- Paul Krugman, American Nobel Prize winning economist
- Owen Jones, British socialist newspaper columnist, political activist and writer
- Joseph Stiglitz, American Nobel Prize winning economist
- Jeffrey Sachs, economist
- Steve Keen, British-based economist and author
- Max Keiser, British-based broadcaster, financial commentator and film maker
- Kim Dotcom, German-Finnish internet entrepreneur, businessperson and political activist
- Harry Leslie Smith, British writer, political activist and former RAF fighter in World War II
- Tariq Ali, British writer, film-maker and journalist

=== Yes ===
- Christopher Pissarides, Cypriot-British Nobel Prize winning economist
- Ieronymos II of Athens, Archbishop of Athens, primate of the Church of Greece
- Sakis Rouvas, Greek Singer

== Political parties ==
This is the official list of endorsements by political parties as it was released by the Ministry of Interior:

=== No ===
- Syriza, governing party of Greece
- Independent Greeks, governing party of Greece
- Golden Dawn, parliamentary opposition party in Greece
- Anticapitalist Left Cooperation for the Overthrow, minor party
- Agricultural Party of Greece, minor party
- United Popular Front, minor party
- Popular Unions of Bipartisan Social Groups, minor party

=== Yes ===
- New Democracy, opposition party
- To Potami, opposition party
- Panhellenic Socialist Movement, opposition party
- Democratic Left, minor party
- Movement of Democratic Socialists (KIDISO), minor party
- Recreate Greece, minor party

=== Others ===
Apart from the parties listed above, the Communist Party of Greece called for the use of a write-in ballot option, "even if they say that it is a spoiled ballot". The Communist Party of Greece (Marxist-Leninist) and the Marxist-Leninist Communist Party of Greece ran a joint campaign for a boycott of the vote. The Organization for the Reconstruction of the Communist Party of Greece also called for a boycott of the vote, calling it a 'fascist farce'.

== Newspapers ==
=== No ===
- The News Line, British Trotskyist daily newspaper
- Morning Star, British socialist daily newspaper

== Organisations ==
=== No ===
- Greece Solidarity Campaign, British-based solidarity organisation
- People's Assembly Against Austerity, British political campaign

=== Yes ===
- Technical Chamber of Greece
- Athens Bar Association
- Panhellenic Federation of Teaching and Research Staff
- Central Union of Greek Municipalities
- Greek Regions Union
