= Front of Solidarity and Overthrow =

Front of Solidarity and Overthrow Μέτωπο Αλληλεγγύης και Ανατροπής
- Leader: Alekos Alavanos
- Founded: 2011
- Dissolved: 2018
- Split from: Coalition of the Radical Left
- Ideology: Communism; Marxism-Leninism; Democratic socialism Anti-capitalism; Euroscepticism
- Political position: Far-left

Website
- tometopo.gr

Front of Solidarity and Overthrow (Greek: Μέτωπο Αλληλεγγύης και Ανατροπής, ΜΑΑ; MAA; literally "Front of Solidarity and Overthrow") was a political party in Greece that split from the Coalition of the Radical Left.

MAA was formed in April 2011 by a splinter group of the Coalition of the Radical Left, that followed Alekos Alavanos (former President of Synaspismos). Four parties that participated in the Coalition of the Radical Left (KOE, DEA, KEDA and APO), supported Alekos Alavanos in the local elections in Attica. They later joined the MAA but they left the front due to political disputes. In the legislative elections of 2012 MAA supported the ANTARSYA.
