= Piraeus A =

Parliamentary constituency of Greece

- Electoral constituency for the Hellenic Parliament
- Piraeus A within Attica

- Attica within Greece
- Regional units: Piraeus, Islands
- Administrative region: Attica
- Electorate: 188,526 (June 2023)

Current Electoral constituency
- Created: 1958
- Number of members: 5 Members of Parliament
- Created from: Piraeus

Piraeus Alpha (Greek: Α΄ Πειραιώς) is a parliamentary constituency in Attica represented in the Hellenic Parliament. It elects five Members of Parliament (MPs) by the reinforced proportional representation system of election. It primarily consists of the city of Piraeus.

== Election results ==
=== Legislative election ===
Piraeus A constituency results

Election	1st party	2nd party	3rd party	4th party	5th party	source
1996	New Democracy 38.21%	PASOK 38.19%	SYN 6.56%	DIKKI 5.31%	KKE 5.25%	
2000	New Democracy 43.21%	PASOK 41.90%	KKE 5.40%	SYN 4.01%	DIKKI 2.67%	
2004	New Democracy 46.18%	PASOK 37.57%	KKE 5.87%	SYRIZA 3.92%	LAOS 3.01%	
2007	New Democracy 42.34%	PASOK 32.57%	KKE 8.95%	SYRIZA 6.76%	LAOS 5.24%	
2009	PASOK 38.88%	New Democracy 32.97%	KKE 8.11%	LAOS 7.56%	SYRIZA 5.83%	
May 2012	SYRIZA 19.16%	New Democracy 16.65%	ANEL 12.55%	XA 8.88%	PASOK 8.60%	
June 2012	New Democracy 29.68%	SYRIZA 28.15%	ANEL 8.82%	PASOK 8.44%	XA 8.23%	
January 2015	SYRIZA 34.42%	New Democracy 29.58%	XA 7.44%	The River 6.36%	ANEL 5.32%	
September 2015	SYRIZA 33.62%	New Democracy 29.46%	XA 7.83%	KKE 5.14%	PASOK 4.44%	
2019	New Democracy 43.73%	SYRIZA 29.72%	KKE 5.51%	PASOK 4.94%	MERA25 3.88%	
May 2023	New Democracy 48.55%	SYRIZA 18.19%	KKE 7.44%	PASOK 5.93%	EL 3.61%	
June 2023	New Democracy 47.27%	SYRIZA 16.58%	KKE 8.02%	PASOK 6.70%	Spartans 4.57%	

== Members of Parliament ==
Members of Parliament (Jun 2023–) - 20th term, 5 seats

- Kostas Katsafados ND
- Domna Michailidou ND
- Nikos Vlachakos ND
- Alexis Tsipras SYRIZA (resigned on 6 October 2025)
  - Thodoris Dritsas SYRIZA (from 8 October 2025 to 8 October 2025)
    - Thodoris Dritsas New Left (Greece) (since 8 October 2025)
- Nikos Ambatielos Communist Party of Greece

=== Members of Parliament (May 2023 –May 2023) - 19th term, 5 seats ===
- Kostas Katsafados ND
- Domna Michailidou ND
- Nikos Vlachakos ND
- Alexis Tsipras SYRIZA (resigned on 6 October 2025)
- Nikos Ambatielos Communist Party of Greece

=== Members of Parliament (Sep 2019 –April 2023) - 18th term, 6 seats ===
- Kostas Katsafados ND
- Ioannis Melas ND
- Nikolaos Manolakos ND
- Noni Dounia ND
- Xristoforos-Emmanouil Boutsikakis ND
- Alexis Tsipras SYRIZA

=== Members of Parliament (Sep 2015 -Jul 2019) - 17th term, 6 seats ===
- Theodoros Dritsas SYRIZA
- Costas Douzinas SYRIZA
- Georgia Gennia SYRIZA
- Eleni Stamataki SYRIZA
- Konstantinos Katsafados ND
- Nikos Kouzilos XA

=== Members of Parliament (Jan 2015 - Sep 2015) - 16th term, 6 seats ===
- Theodoros Dritsas SYRIZA
- Stathis Leoutsakos SYRIZA (until 21 August 2015)
  - Stathis Leoutsakos Laiki Enotita (since 21 August 2015)
- Eleni Stamataki SYRIZA
- Kostas Katsafados ND
- Stavroula Antonakou The River
- Nikos Kouzilos XA

=== Members of Parliament (Jun 2012 – Dec 2014) - 15th term, 6 seats ===
- Κωνσταντίνος Αρβανιτόπουλος ND
- Kostas Katsafados ND
- Thodoris Dritsas SYRIZA
- Panagiotis Melas ANEL (until 1 December 2014)
  - Panagiotis Melas Independent (from 1 December 2014 to 3 December 2014)
    - Panagiotis Melas Aneksartitoi Dimokratikoi Vouleftes, parliamentary group, (from 3 December 2014)
- Nikolaos Kouzilos XA
- Μαρία Ρεπούση DIMAR

=== Members of Parliament (May 2012 – May 2012) - 14th term, 6 seats ===
- Κωνσταντίνος Αρβανιτόπουλος ND
- Thodoris Dritsas SYRIZA
- Panagiotis Melas ANEL
- Nikolaos Kouzilos XA
- Maria Repousi DIMAR
- Elpida Pantelaki Communist Party of Greece
