= Syriza Youth =

Syriza Youth Νεολαία ΣΥΡΙΖΑ
- National Council Secretary: Panos Lamprinidis - Stachtos
- Founded: 22 December 2013
- Preceded by: SYN Youth
- Headquarters: Themistokleous 52, Exarcheia, Athens
- Ideology: Democratic socialism Social democracy Secularism
- Mother party: Coalition of the Radical Left (SYRIZA)
- Website: www.neolaiasyriza.gr

Syriza Youth (Greek: Νεολαία ΣΥΡΙΖΑ) is the youth organisation of the Coalition of the Radical Left (Syriza) in Greece. Founded in 2013, it was a member of the European Network of Democratic Young Left (Endyl).

== Formation ==
Logo of Syriza Youth (2014–2021)

The Syriza Youth was founded when the largely bottom-up structure of Young Syriza (Νέοι–Νέες ΣΥΡΙΖΑ) groups and the Synaspismos Youth united forming a nationwide organisation.

At the founding conference on 19–22 December 2013, 522 delegates of the 128 local groups both in Greece and abroad convened in Kerameikos, Athens. The four-day conference was also attended by a number of Syriza leaders including party secretary Dimitris Vitsas and parliamentary spokesman Panagiotis Kouroumplis.

On 22 December, the delegates ratified the final text of the founding declaration on the first ballot. Inner-organisational tensions however culminated when the "Left Platform" opposed the final text arguing that it lacked a clear political position as a government of the Left should not accept any compromise with its creditors. The "Left Movement" voted blank after their "Charter of the Rights of Youth" had been rejected as an amendment by a majority of the delegates.

The delegates concluded with the election of 67 members of the organisation's first Central Council with the more pragmatic factions winning a clear majority. Four additional members remained to be appointed as honorary members.

First election of the Syriza Youth Central Council, December 2013
List name	Votes	%	Members
Founding declaration–Reconstruction (Ιδρυτική Διακήρυξη-Ανασύνθεση)	231	47,43%	32
Left Movement (Αριστερή Κίνηση)	171	35,11%	24
Left Platform (Αριστερή Πλατφόρμα)	74	15,2%	10
Communist Tendency (Κομμουνιστική Τάση)	11	2,26%	1
Total elected	487	100%	67
blank votes	16		
invalid ballots	1		
4 additional members are appointed as Honorary members (Αριστίνδην). Source: I Avgi

== Founding Declaration ==
By its founding declaration the organisation defines itself as being part of the radical left that participates in the class struggle striving to abolish all kinds of exploitation and aiming at a Socialism of the 21st century. The organisation's manifesto includes ten positions:

1. Young peoples' rights
2. Anti-fascism
3. Alternative, non-commercial culture
4. Feminism and opposition to the patriarchy
5. Democratic and social rights
6. Anti-racism and opposition to "Fortress Europe"
7. Green politics
8. Public space appropriation
9. Free access to amateur sports
10. A solidarity economy.

Syriza Youth upholds a quota of one third for young women to participate in all organisational bodies.

== Local and international branches ==
Apart from branches all over Greece, the Syriza Youth also has a number of international branches in Belgium, France, Germany, the Netherlands, Sweden and the United Kingdom.

== Dissolution ==
On 1 September 2015, 38 out of 71 members of the Syriza Youth central council, including the national secretary Elias Panteleakοs, resigned, withdrawing their support for Syriza in the forthcoming elections.
