= Thodoris Dritsas =

Greek politician

- Θοδωρής Δρίτσας
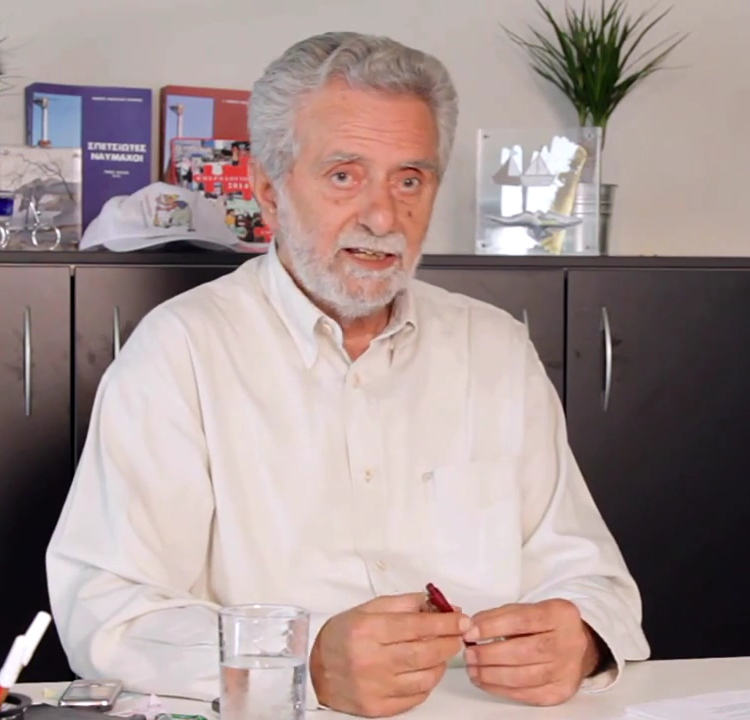
- During an interview, 2014

Minister of Shipping and Island Policy
- In office 23 September 2015 – 5 November 2016
- Prime Minister: Alexis Tsipras
- Preceded by: Christos Zois
- Succeeded by: Panagiotis Kouroumblis

Alternate Minister for Shipping and the Aegean
- In office 27 January 2015 – 28 August 2015
- Prime Minister: Alexis Tsipras
- Preceded by: Miltiadis Varvitsiotis
- Succeeded by: Christos Zois

Personal details
- Born: 23 August 1947 (age 79) Piraeus, Greece
- Party: New Left
- Other political affiliations: Syriza
- Spouse: Tasia Christodoulopoulou
- Education: National and Kapodistrian University of Athens

Thodoris Dritsas (Greek: Θοδωρής Δρίτσας; born 23 August 1947) is a Greek politician. As a member of the Syriza party, he served as the Minister of Shipping and Island Policy and Alternate Minister for Shipping and the Aegean in the first and second cabinets of Alexis Tsipras. Formerly a member of the Hellenic Parliament, he is set to retake a seat in Piraeus A' following the resignation of Tsipras, becoming the twelfth MP representing Nea Aristera (NA).

== Early life ==
Dritsas was born in Piraeus in 1947. He reached the graduate year in Law studies at the University of Athens. In 1972, he joined the pharmacy family business as a partner owner. During the 21 April military dictatorship, Dritsas was active in anti-government agitation. After democracy was restored in 1975, he was active in the Organisation Socialist Revolution extra-parliamentary organization.

In 2004, he represented his organization in the formation of the Coalition of the Radical Left that became known by its initials in Greek, "Syriza."

== Local politics ==
Dritsas was a Piraeus mayoral candidate in the 1998, 2002, 2006, and 2014 elections, heading the political alliance called "Port of Anguish". From 2002 to 2007 he served at the Municipal Council of Piraeus.

== National politics ==
Dritsas was first elected Member of the Hellenic Parliament (MP) in the 2007 legislative election, standing in Piraeus.

Following Syriza's win at the January 2015 general election, Dritsas was appointed Alternate Minister for Shipping and the Aegean. Upon assuming ministerial duties, he announced the "immediate cancellation" of the Piraeus Port Authority (aka OLP) privatization, adding that "the public character of the port will be maintained. The OLP sell-off stops here."

Following Syriza's win in the September 2015 snap legislative election, Dritsas was appointed Minister of Shipping and Island Policy in the new government. In that capacity, in April 2016, Dritsas co-signed the agreement with the Chinese government whereby the Syriza government sold a controlling stake in the Piraeus Port Authority to the Cosco state shipping group of China.

Following Alexis Tsipras' resignation from Parliament on 6 October 2025, Dritsas is the next candidate in line for a parliamentary seat in Piraeus A'. However, Dritsas has since left SYRIZA and joined Nea Aristera (NA). Dritsas has told To Vima that he intends to take up Tsipras' seat, meaning that he will become the twelfth parliamentarian for NA.

== Hunger strike controversy ==
On 8 January 2021, Dimitris Koufodinas, a jailed former member of the 17 November group, began a hunger strike demanding to be transferred from the "high-security prison" in Domokos, in central Greece, back to the Korydallos prison in Athens. In March 2021, Dritsas, speaking to a Piraeus local radio station, expressed his support for Koufodinas' hunger strike, stating the following:

What the (New Democracy) government is doing [by refusing Koufodinas' demand] will revive the discourse on the armed [struggle] and so-called terrorism, even though I believe no one was ever terrorized by the actions of those organizations. No one has been terrorized by the 17 November [organization]. I have said this many times.

The New Democracy governing party condemned Dritsas' statement as "vulgar" and "insulting to the memory of the organization's victims" The center-left Movement for Change (KINAL) party denounced in parliament the comments made by Dritsas as "unacceptable, ahistorical and provocative," stating that "terrorism is the enemy of democracy." Dritsas, the next day, issued a "clarifying" statement, arguing that his original comments were in reference to "the Greek democracy, the citizens of democracy, and the values of a just state, which the terrorists never respected." Syriza issued a statement characterizing Dritsas' comments as "unfortunate," adding that "what he said does not express either him or Syriza." The statement concluded that "besides, [Dritsas] clarified [his comments] immediately with his additional statement in no uncertain terms."
