= Communist Renewal =

Κομμουνιστική Ανανέωση Communist Renewal
- Founded: 2000
- Dissolved: 2015
- Split from: Renewing Communist Ecological Left
- Newspaper: Stigma
- Ideology: Communism
- Colours: Red, White

Website
- komman.wordpress.com

Communist Renewal (Greek: Κομμουνιστική Ανανέωση, ΚΟΜΑΝ; Kommounistiki Ananeosi; KOMAN) was a communist organization in Greece. The group was formed in February 2000 following a split in late 1999 from the Renewing Communist Ecological Left (AKOA). The founders of Communist Renewal were dissatisfied with the upcoming cooperation between AKOA and Synaspismos. Communist Renewal then aligned with the Communist Party of Greece (KKE) in the 2000 elections. The alliance with KKE was then discontinued, but rekindled for the 2006 Greek local elections.

The organization published the newspaper Stigma.
