= European Network of Democratic Young Left =

- Formation: 6–8 May 1994 in Copenhagen
- Dissolved: March 2016; 10 years ago
- Type: Democratic socialism Green left Radical democracy
- Headquarters: Berlin, Germany
- President: Alexandr Roshko
- Parent organization: European Left

The European Network of Democratic Young Left (ENDYL) was an independent network of left-wing democratic socialist political youth organisations in Europe.

ENDYL was open to European youth organisations of the democratic left that neither follow a social democratic nor an uncritically orthodox communist course. Its agenda was based on democracy, individual freedom, solidarity, human rights, internationalism and ecological responsibility.

Founded in Copenhagen, 6 to 8 May 1994, ENDYL consisted of 17 socialist, green left and radical democratic youth organisations in 2012. It worked together with the Party of the European Left as well as with social movements and with organisations from the countries of the Southern Hemisphere.

From 2012 on the network was no longer active, and in March 2016 ENDYL formally confirmed its dissolution. Some of its members are participating in the formation of the Young European Left as its successor.

== Members ==
- Denmark — Socialistisk UngdomsFront
- Estonia — Estonian Left Party Youth
- Finland — Vasemmistonuoret
- France — Jeunes Communistes
- Germany — Linksjugend ['solid]
- Germany — JungdemokratInnen/Junge Linke
- Greece — SYRIZA Youth
- Ireland — Sinn Féin Republican Youth
- Iceland — Young Left Green (Ung Vinstri Græn)
- Italy — Young Communists
- Macedonia — Young Socialists of Macedonia
- Moldova — Union of the Communist Youth of Moldova (Komsomol)
- Norway — Sosialistisk Ungdom
- Poland — Młodzi Razem
- Portugal — Bloco de Esquerda
- Spain — Izquierda Unida (Área de juventud de Izquierda Unida), Alternativa Jove
- Turkey — Özgürlük ve Dayanışma Partisi

== Board of ENDYL 2010-2011 ==
Toivo Haimi — Vasemmistonuoret
Alexandr Roshko — Union of the Communist Youth of Moldova
Naum Stojcevski - Young Socialists of Macedonia
Nefeli Samiakou - Νεολαία Συνασπισμού / Neolaia Synaspismou
Daniel Kaszubowski — Młodzi Socjaliści

== Board of ENDYL 2012 ==
Alexandr Roshko — Union of the Communist Youth of Moldova
Naum Stojcevski - Young Socialists of Macedonia
Dimitris Karamanis - Νεολαία Συνασπισμού / Neolaia Synaspismou
Simone Oggionni — Young Communists
