= Deport Racism Organization =

Greek anti-racism and anti-fascism organization

The Deport Racism Organization (Greek: Κίνηση Απελάστε το Ρατσισμό, ΚΑΡ, KAR), founded in 2007, is an organization of immigrants and Greek citizens against racism and neo-fascism.

Their aims include the legalization of immigrants, asylum for refugees, citizenship for the children of immigrants, equal political and social rights for all, allowing migrant workers into trade unions and the dissolution of fascist organizations.

In April 2010, the organization protested about police raids in Athens.

During the prefectural pre-election period (October 2010), KAR presented evidence of fascist organization Golden Dawn participating and organizing the attacks against Alekos Alavanos – candidate for Attika prefecture – and Eleni Portaliou – candidate for the municipality of Athens, both SYRIZA members.

== See also ==
- Internationalist Workers' Left
