= Nikos Vlachakos =

Greek politician

Nikos Vlachakos (Greek: Νίκος Βλαχάκος) is a Greek politician from New Democracy. He was elected to the Hellenic Parliament from Piraeus A in the June 2023 Greek legislative election.

== See also ==
- List of members of the Hellenic Parliament, June 2023
