= Ioannis Mouzalas =

Greek obstetrician-gynecologist and surgeon

- Ιωάννης Μουζάλας
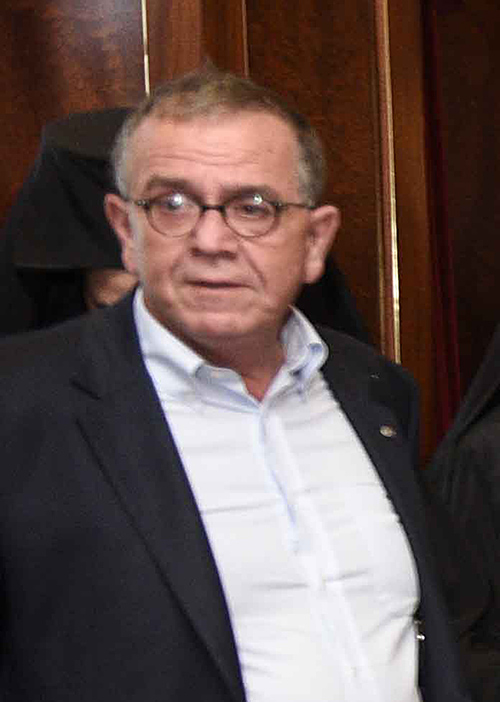
- Mouzalas in 2015

Minister for Immigration Policy
- In office 5 November 2016 – 28 February 2018
- Prime Minister: Alexis Tsipras
- Preceded by: position established
- Succeeded by: Dimitris Vitsas

Alternate Minister for Immigration Policy
- In office 23 September 2015 – 5 November 2016
- Prime Minister: Alexis Tsipras
- Preceded by: himself
- Succeeded by: position abolished

Alternate Minister for Immigration Policy
- In office 28 August 2015 – 21 September 2015
- Prime Minister: Vassiliki Thanou-Christophilou
- Preceded by: Tasia Christodoulopoulou
- Succeeded by: himself

Personal details
- Education: University of Athens

Ioannis Mouzalas (Greek: Ιωάννης Μουζάλας) is a Greek obstetrician-gynecologist, surgeon and one of the founding members of the Greek chapter of Doctors of the World.

In August 2015, he was appointed Alternate Minister for Immigration Policy in the Caretaker Cabinet of Vassiliki Thanou-Christophilou. Following the September 2015 election, he was confirmed in office as a member of the Second Cabinet of Alexis Tsipras. From November 2016 to July 2019, the immigration portfolio was elevated to a ministry in its own right.

== Early life and education ==
Mouzalas graduated from the Athens Medical School, University of Athens, before continuing his studies in Milan and London.

== Medical career ==
Mouzalas has worked in Tzaneio Hospital, Agios Savvas Hospital and Elena Hospital. In London, he worked with Michel Odent. In 1999, he made the first childbirth in Greece in water. Mouzalas is one of the founding members of Doctors of the World and has participated in more than 25 missions in Asia and Africa.

== Political career ==
Mouzalas was appointed as the Alternate Minister of Immigration Policy in the Caretaker Cabinet of Vassiliki Thanou-Christophilou. On 4 September, he announced four measures to help combat the European migrant crisis: creation of a coordination centre to manage the refugee flow, improved and increased logistical and staff support to existing facilities, taking immediate advantage of European solidarity program and community funds and providing necessary funds and resources to help local economies on the islands affected.

On 15 March 2016, in an interview with Skai TV, Mouzalas referred to Greece's northern neighbour simply as "Macedonia", sparking a demand for his resignation from coalition partner Panos Kammenos due to the Macedonia naming dispute. Mouzalas apologised for "slip-up", but on 16 March Kammenos reiterated his demand for Mouzalas' resignation. Following a lunchtime meeting with Alexis Tsipras, Kammenos declared that the "Independent Greeks support the government but not the migration minister." Nevertheless, the government defended Mouzalas, saying in a statement that it was "irresponsible and hypocritical" to undermine him during the European migrant crisis.
