= Synaspismos Youth =

Synaspismos Youth Νεολαία Συνασπισμού
- Leader: Ilias Chronopoulos
- Founded: 1994
- Dissolved: December 2013
- Merged into: SYRIZA Youth
- Ideology: Democratic socialism Eco-socialism; Eurocommunism
- Mother party: Synaspismos
- European affiliation: European Network of Democratic Young Left (ENDYL)

Synaspismos Youth (Greek: Νεολαία Συνασπισμού; "Coalition's Youth"), was the youth organisation of Synaspismos. Until 1999, it was named Union of Left Youth.

The Synaspismos Youth participated in the Left Unity in the Greek Universities with smaller left-wing student organisations. It published a magazine called "Enedra" every two months.

A member of the European Network of Democratic Young Left (Endyl), Synaspismos Youth has been described as "one of its pillars." Under the leadership of today's Greek prime minister Alexis Tsipras, the organisation took an active part in the process of creating the Greek Social Forum. It also participated in alter-globalist struggles and together with its European sister organisations co-organised events in the context of the 4th European Social Forum, 2006 in Athens.
