= Communist Party of Greece/Marxist–Leninist =

Communist party in Greece

The Communist Party of Greece/Marxist–Leninist (KKE/ML; Greek: Κομμουνιστικό Κόμμα Ελλάδας/Μαρξιστικό-Λενινιστικό, ΚΚΕ/ΜΛ) was a communist party in Greece. It was founded in 1969 under the name Organization of Greek Marxist-Leninists (Greek: Οργάνωση Ελλήνων Μαρξιστών-Λενινιστών, ΟΕΜΛ; OEML), a splinter group of the Organisation of Marxists–Leninists of Greece (OMLE). Dissatisfied with the state of affairs in OMLE, OEML wanted a more confrontational line towards the then ruling military junta. The name KKE/ML was adopted after the junta's fall, on November 3, 1974. The party published the monthly Kokkini Simaia ("Red Flag"). The publishing house Poreia was linked to the party.

Rather than forming student or trade union organizations of its own, KKE/ML sought to organize militant cells within established movements.
