= Alekos Alavanos =

Greek politician

Alexandros Alavanos
- Αλέκος Αλαβάνος
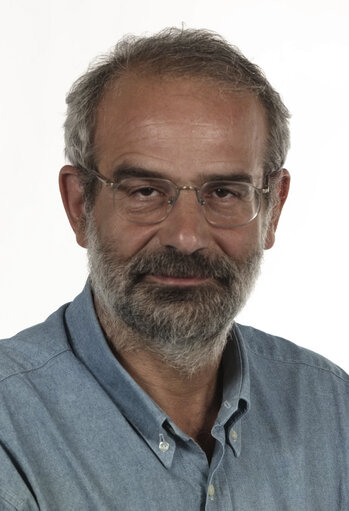
- Alekos Alavanos

President of Synaspismos
- In office 12 December 2004 – 11 February 2008
- Preceded by: Nikos Konstantopoulos
- Succeeded by: Alexis Tsipras

Member of the European Parliament for Greece
- In office 15 June 1989 – 13 June 2004
- In office 18 October 1981 – 17 June 1984

Personal details
- Born: 22 May 1950 (age 75) Athens, Greece
- Party: Plan B (2013–2018)
- Other political affiliations: KKE (?–1991); SYRIZA (1991–2013)

Alexandros "Alekos" Alavanos (Greek: Αλέξανδρος (Αλέκος) Αλαβάνος; born 22 May 1950) is a Greek politician, former member of the Hellenic Parliament and the European Parliament. From 2004 until 2008 he was president of the Coalition of the Left of Movements and Ecology, commonly known as Synaspismos. He was parliamentary leader of the wider Coalition of the Radical Left (SYRIZA).

== Biography ==
=== Early life ===
Born on 22 May 1950 in Athens, Alavanos has been politically active since his youth. During the Greek military junta of 1967–1974, Alavanos participated in the student movement against the regime; as a result his military service deferment was revoked and he was briefly incarcerated in the EAT/ESA military prison.

=== Political career ===
He was elected to the European Parliament in 1981 with the Communist Party of Greece and again in 1989, 1994 and 1999 with Synaspismos.

In the 2004 Greek legislative election, Alavanos was elected MP in Athens. Since Nikos Konstantopoulos, his predecessor in Synaspismos' leadership, announced his intention not to be a candidate for another term, Alavanos announced his own candidacy for the office. The party congress elected him president on 12 December 2004.

In the 2007 Greek legislative election, running as leader of SYRIZA, which more than doubled its parliamentary seats, he was narrowly elected an MP in Heraklion, Crete.

On 27 November 2007, Alavanos announced that he would not apply for a renewal of his presidency of Synaspismos at its 5th party congress in February 2008, due to private reasons. He was replaced by Alexis Tsipras.

"In Europe all the big powers, the parties, the banks, the big corporations have a plan B to deal with the prospect of Greece's exit from the eurozone. Only Greece has not in hand a plan B. Both the government and the parties in opposition have neglected the necessity to work on a plan B. If however, Greece is taken by surprise when forced to exit the eurozone, with people panicking, this is going to be a disaster."

—Alavanos, as quoted in Workers' Liberty

In February 2011 he left Synaspismos and founded the Front of Solidarity and Overthrow with other former members of Coalition of the Radical Left. Communist Organization of Greece, Internationalist Workers' Left, Movement for the Unity of Action of the Left and Anticapitalist Political Group joined the front, but they left it in 2012 due to political disputes.

He again founded a new political party in 2013, founding Plan B specifically to contest the 2014 European Parliament election in Greece. The party's platform is centered on exiting Greece from the eurozone.

=== Personal life ===
Alekos Alavanos is an economist. He is married to Aikaterini Charalambaki and is the father of two daughters.

== See also ==
- Politics of Greece

== Notes ==
Party political offices
Preceded by Nikos Konstantopoulos	Chairman of Synaspismos; 2004 – 2008	Succeeded by Alexis Tsipras
