= Progressive All-Student Unionist Camp =

PPSP poster from 1975, announcing a Chile-Spain solidarity meeting

The Progressive All-Student Unionist Camp (Greek: Προοδευτική Πανσπουδαστική Συνδικαλιστική Παράταξη, Proodeftiki Panspoudastiki Syndikalistiki Parataxi, abbreviated PPSP) was a students movement in Greece.

PPSP was founded in May 1966. The movement was able to gain considerable influence amongst student in Athens and Thessaloniki. PPSP published the magazine Spoudastikos kosmos (Σπουδαστικός κόσμος, 'Students World'). PPSP was a front organization of the Organisation of Marxists-Leninists of Greece (OMLE). During the Athens Polytechnic uprising PPSP member Grigoris Kollitsidas formed part of the University Coordination Committee.

With the fall of the Junta OMLE developed two other mass organizations alongside PPSP, the Progressive Workers Unionist Camp (PESP) and the Progressive Students Unionist Camp (PMSP, for secondary students). Later PPSP became the student wing of the Communist Party of Greece (Marxist-Leninist) (KKE(m-l)).

In December 1979 PPSP, Choros and AAPSE joined forces to combat "Law 815". Together they gained majorities at various student assemblies around the country. The assemblies voted to occupy university departments in Athens, Thessaloniki, Ioannina, Patras and Rethymno. After the protests had subdued the Greek government withdrew the law.

Following the fall of the Junta, PPSP contested student elections. In 1974 it obtained 2.64% of the votes. Thereafter the vote share of PPSP vacillated between 4.3% (1975), 5.47% (1976), 4.8% (1977), 5.4% (1978), 5.6% (1979), 5.6% (1980) and 2.1% (1981).
