= Yannis Hotzeas =

Greek communist

Yannis Hotzeas (Greek: Γιάννης Χοντζέας) (1930 – 24 October 1994) was a Greek communist, Marxist theoretician and one of the principal founders of the Greek Marxist-Leninist movement.

== Early life ==
Hotzeas was born in Koroni, Messenia, Peloponnese, in a poor family. In 1941, his elder brothers are already organized in EPON, the youth organization of the National Liberation Front (EAM) fighting the Nazi occupation forces. In 1943 Hotzeas became a devoted and extremely active member of EPON in Athens, under the name Aristides. The next year, despite his very young age, Hotzeas became a member of the Communist Party of Greece (KKE), according to an exceptional decision of the Party leadership.

== Persecutions ==
Since 1944, Hotzeas took part in the fights against the Nazi forces and their collaborators. The liberation in December 1944 was followed by fights against the British Army that arrived in Athens and opposed the communist-led National Liberation Front forces.

During the following two years Hotzeas was arrested and tortured several times, both by the local police and by the British. In 1947, while the Greek Civil War was raging, Hotzeas was arrested again and exiled to Makronisos and then in other islands. Despite the tortures, he refused to declare any repentance for his beliefs. For this reason he was kept in exile until 1958.

== Disagreements ==
Already in exile, Hotzeas becomes a leading figure in the opposition of the communist rank-and-file to the "new line" promoted by the Communist Party of the Soviet Union after its 20th Congress. This line was imposed on the Communist Party of Greece (KKE) after a violent intervention of the Soviet Party in the internal affairs of KKE, which resulted to the unconstitutional replacement and persecution of its legitimate leadership and to the expulsion of thousands of its members. Returning from the exile, Hotzeas becomes one of the main poles of opposition to the changing and more "mild" policies of the Greek Left's new leadership.

== Building the Greek M-L movement ==
In the early 1960s Hotzeas started to translate the documents of the international debate between the Chinese Communist Party and the Communist Party of the Soviet Union, which marked the Sino-Soviet split. In 1964, he led the publication of the magazine Renaissance (Greek: Αναγέννηση – Anagenisi), and then the creation and development of the Organisation of Marxists-Leninists of Greece (OMLE).

== 1967–1974 military dictatorship ==
Right after the military coup of 21 April 1967 which established a Greek military junta, Hotzeas passed in clandestinity and continued leading the OMLE. He was arrested two years later and started a new period of life in exile, interrupted briefly during the "liberalisation" of the military regime in 1973. He was arrested and exiled once more after his participation in the anti-fascist popular uprising of 17 November 1973 (Athens Polytechnic uprising), and regained his freedom only after the fall of the military dictatorship in July 1974.

== Death ==
Hotzeas died of cancer in 1994.
