= Immigrants' school on Sundays (Athens) =

Coordinates: 37.98379°N 23.71950°E

Immigrants' school on Sundays (Greek: Κυριακάτικο Σχολείο Μεταναστών) is a multicultural school in Athens created in 2004 by Greek anti-racists and immigrants/refugees.

It is an initiative of the movement Deport racism (Greek: Απελάστε το ρατσισμό) and it is financed by its members and supporters, mainly through its annual feast. It does not receive money from the state or EU.

It is situated in Giatrakou 22 street in Metaxourgeio neighborhood in Athens. Its main object of teaching is Greek language, but other languages such as English, German and Spanish have been taught as well. All lessons are taught by volunteers; Greek language lessons mainly by native speakers.

From 2004 until today thousands of students from multiple countries have studied in the school. For example, in 2018 the number of students reached 700. The lessons are addressed mainly to adults, but there is also support for children that follow their parents to the school. Students do not need to have a residence permit.

== Actions ==
The Immigrants' School on Sundays promotes the cooperation of the refugee and immigrant community with the residents of the wider area, as well as with local organizations for the development of collective actions. It organizes solidarity actions (collection of food, medicine for refugees and local unemployed and people in poverty), cultural events and the publication of a calendar while simultaneously carrying out activist actions.

== Awards ==
In 2015, the school was awarded by International Conference in Open and Distance Learning (ICODL) for its active role in asserting the rights of immigrants and refugees, against racism and xenophobia, and in general for its overall contribution to the fight against social and educational exclusion.
