= George Mavrikos =

Greek politician (born 1950)

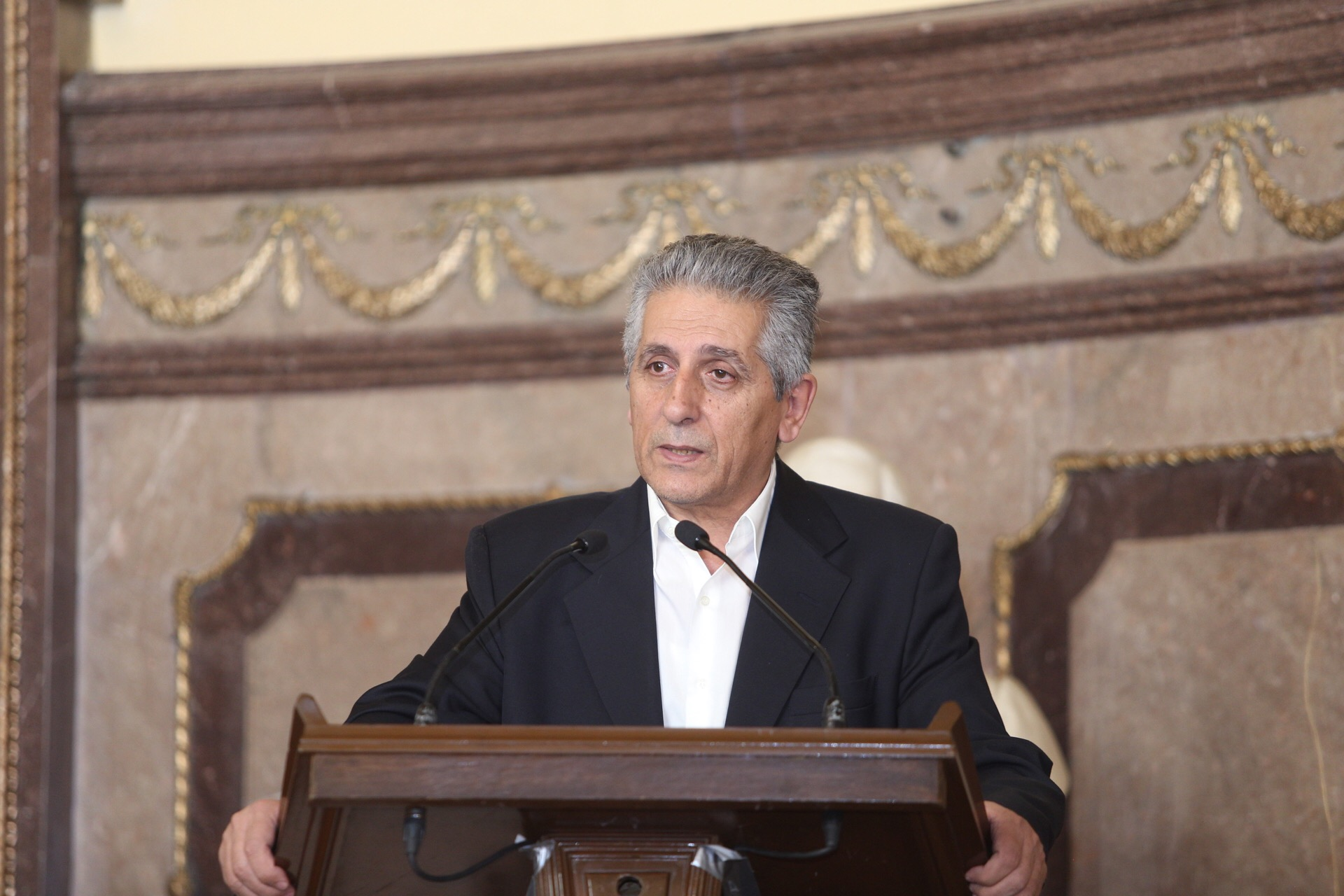
Ceremonia de Visitante Distinguido George Mavrikos -i---i- (33603439153)

George Mavrikos (born 1950) is a former General Secretary of the World Federation of Trade Unions (WFTU) in Athens, Greece. He is a leading member of the Communist Party of Greece (KKE), and former member of Greek parliament. He is largely credited for having led the successful efforts to halt the decline of the World Federation of Trade Unions since the fall of the Soviet Union. Since his election as general secretary during the congress in Havana in 2005, the World Federation of Trade Unions has seen an increase in its number of affiliates and has successfully managed to recruit several trade union of importances in Western Europe.

== Biography ==
Personal life

George Mavrikos comes from the island of Skyros, a small island in the North Aegean Sea of two thousand citizens. His parents were shepherds, like all his ancestors. Most of the inhabitants were shepherds, the rest fishermen and farmers. He lived in Skyros from his birth in 1950 until he was 15 years old and then he moved in Athens. He completed his secondary education at the municipality of Agioi Anargyroi. He got involved in the grass-root movement from his school years.

Political and trade union action

In Athens, his first job was as an agricultural worker in the “Ponirakis” greenhouses while he was still a student. While he was an evening student at the “Omiros” technical school in N. Ionia, he worked for a short time as a loader at the shipyards of the port city Skaramagas and at the “Anoxal” metal factory. He then worked in the textile industry in large factories, such as the German company “Hudson” from which he was dismissed for his trade union activity. After this he worked to “Klostiria Attikis” from where he was also fired for political reasons as well as to smaller textile factories in Athens. He worked as a commercial employee for four years in a central commercial store in Athens, then in Thessaloniki and Larissa; for 11 years he worked in a large company of tractors and agricultural machinery, while during the same period, as a worker student, he studied at the Faculty of Law of the Aristotle University of Thessaloniki.

During the 7 years of dictatorship in Greece (1967–1974) he was fired twice from his work in textile factories due to his trade union and political action. He participated in November 1973 in the Polytechnic uprising of students against the dictatorship in which 27 militants were killed by the guns of the army and the police. He was then arrested by the police.

While he was working for 11 years in the big factory of agricultural machinery, he was elected chairman of the workers union. He started from the base, from the factories, elected by grassroot Committees within workplaces to rise step by step to the highest positions of responsibility. This endowed him with the experience and knowledge that comes from direct, daily contact with ordinary workers and their problems. In 1976, he was elected to the leadership of the Athens Private Employees’ Union and later became President of the Union. In 1982 he was elected as organizational secretary of the Athens Labor Center (EKA), which was and is the largest Departmental Union in Greece.

During 1985–1986 he studied in the Faculty of Political and Social Sciences in Moscow.

From 1993 to 1998 he was elected general secretary of the Greek General Confederation of Labour (GSEE). He was also for 10 years president of the Institute of Greek Trade Union Movement History (ARISTOS).

During 1999–2007 he headed PAME (All Workers Militant Front). Because of his trade union and political action he has been brought to the employers and government court many times.

From 2007 until 2013 he was elected Member of the Hellenic Parliament with the Communist Party of Greece.

International trade union action

George Mavrikos has started his trade union course within the Greek trade union movement from the base. He did the same within the international one. His first contact with the WFTU was in 1976 in Sofia Bulgaria during a meeting of the sector of Agricultural products. He was a member of the European Social Fund in the European Union at the period 1982-1985 representing the Greek General Confederation of Labour (GSEE). In 1983 he attended a WFTU seminar in Budapest Hungary. During 1985-1986 he participated in various meetings of the WFTU in Moscow USSR.

In 1994 he took part in the 13th World Trade Union Congress in Damascus Syria, which was a crucial Congress for the course of the WFTU and for the international militant trade union movement in total. In 2000 in the 14th World Trade Union Congress in New Delhi India, he was elected vice-president of the WFTU and secretary of the WFTU Regional European Office (2000-2005). In the 15th Congress of the WFTU in Havana, Cuba, he was elected general secretary. In the 16th Congress of WFTU in Athens Greece, George Mavrikos was re-elected general secretary of the WFTU and in the 17th World Trade Union Congress in Durban South Africa, he was reelected general secretary of the WFTU (total 2005-2022). The delegates of the 18th World Trade Union Congress, held in May 2022, in Rome, as a sign of honor for his contribution, declared him Honorary President of the WFTU.

In the years 2006-2022, he was accredited permanent representative of the WFTU to the UN, in New York and to the ILO, in Geneva, where he addressed the annual Plenary Session sixteen times. He was co-organizer of the World Trade Union Forum in Beijing during the period 2006-2011. He has visited, as a leader of the WFTU, 87 countries from all continents. He has been a keynote speaker at 120 international forums and international initiatives. He has received very important state awards in Cuba, Vietnam, South Africa, Venezuela, Syria, Palestine, Sudan and has received numerous awards from major trade unions and social organizations around the world. He has met dozens of important prime ministers and state presidents.

He speaks Greek, English and Russian.

Evaluation of the action

For his political and union activity, he was persecuted by the employers and by the bourgeois state. He was arrested several times by the police, judged by bourgeois courts. In total, he was fired 6 times. In 2018, when he was the permanent representative of the WFTU to the UN, the US State Department and its embassy in Athens banned him from entering the United States, calling him a danger to the country (https://www.902.gr/eidisi/ergatiki-taxi/150776/kataggellei-tin-arnisi-ton-ipa-gia-ekdosi-vizas-ston-geniko-grammatea, https://www.902.gr/sites/default/files/MediaV2/20180208/pso_diamartyria_gia_mi_horigisi_vizas.pdf)

Throughout his path, he never lost constant contact with his roots and his island.

[1]

Written work

The labor union movement 1918-1948: Two lines in constant confrontation, Modern Era Publications, Athens, 2001, 4th edition.

Pastoral of Skyros, 1st edition by the Agricultural Cooperative of Skyros, 2020. 2nd edition by the Municipality of Skyros 2023.

Critical Notes on the History of the World Trade Union Movement: Issues of tactics and strategy, published by the International Workers' Institute (IWI), 2024.
