= Marxist–Leninist Communist Party of Greece =

Marxist–Leninist Communist Party of Greece Μαρξιστικό-Λενινιστικό Κομμουνιστικό Κόμμα Ελλάδας
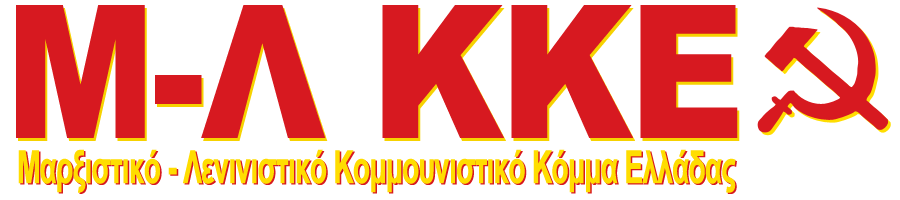
- Founded: November 1976
- Split from: OEML
- Newspaper: Laikos Dromos
- Ideology: Communism; Marxism; Maoism; Stalinism
- Political position: Far-left
- Colours: Red
- Parliament: 0 / 300
- European Parliament: 0 / 21

Website
- m-lkke.gr

The Marxist–Leninist Communist Party of Greece (Greek: Μαρξιστικό-Λενινιστικό Κομμουνιστικό Κόμμα Ελλάδας, Μ-Λ ΚΚΕ, Marxistiko-Leninistiko Kommounistiko Komma Elladas, M-L KKE) is an anti-revisionist Marxist–Leninist communist party in Greece.

== History ==
M-L KKE originates in the Organisation of Marxists–Leninists of Greece (OMLE) that split away from the Communist Party of Greece (KKE) in 1964, opposing Nikita Khrushchev's De-Stalinization and supporting Mao Zedong and his political beliefs in the Sino-Soviet split. After Mao's death in 1976, OMLE split into two major factions: the M-L KKE and the rival Communist Party of Greece (Marxist–Leninist) (KKE M-L), as well as further smaller groupings. M-L KKE and KKE M-L have remained the two largest Maoist parties in Greece since. Historically, M-L KKE has had a significant presence among teachers and education workers and is most active in West Macedonia, Alexandroupoli, Corfu, and Ikaria.

The group, which has published its own journal, Laikos Dromos, was led from its foundation by Isaac Jordanidis, who had been a functionary within the KKE. Jordanidis was a strong supporter of the Three Worlds Theory, and the group took a Maoist line as a result. A delegation from the party travelled to Beijing in 1977 where they held a meeting with Li Xiannian.

In the 2000 legislative election, M-L KKE and A/synechia participated together, receiving 5,866 votes. In the legislative election of 2004, M-L KKE participated alone, receiving 4,846 votes. In the 2007 legislative election, M-L KKE received 8,088 votes (0.11%).

On 16 March 2012, spurred by the ongoing Greek financial crisis, M-L KKE and KKE M-L announced that they would jointly contest elections as part of the Popular Resistance – Left Anti-Imperialist Cooperation (Λαϊκή Αντίσταση – Αριστερή Αντιμπεριαλιστική Συνεργασία), distancing themselves both from the traditional Communist Party of Greece (KKE) and the leftist Syriza coalition.

== Newspaper ==
Laikos Dromos header

M-L KKE publishes the Laikos Dromos (Λαϊκός Δρόμος, "People's Path") newspaper, founded in December 1967 as OMLE's newspaper.

== Election results ==
=== Hellenic Parliament ===
Election	Hellenic Parliament					Rank	Government	Leader
Election	Votes	%	±pp	Seats won	+/−	Rank	Government	Leader
1993	1,817	0.03%	New	0 / 300	New	15th	Extra-parliamentary	Collective leadership
1996	4,019	0.06%	+0.03	0 / 300	0	16th	Extra-parliamentary	Collective leadership
2000 (Note: Run as part of the Left! coalition (M-L KKE and A/synechia).)	5,879	0.09%	+0.03	0 / 300	0	14th	Extra-parliamentary	Collective leadership
2004	4,765	0.06%	–0.03	0 / 300	0	12th	Extra-parliamentary	Collective leadership
2007	8,137	0.11%	+0.05	0 / 300	0	12th	Extra-parliamentary	Collective leadership
2009	5,219	0.08%	–0.03	0 / 300	0	15th	Extra-parliamentary	Collective leadership
May 2012 (Note: Run in coalition with KKE (m-l).)	16,010	0.25%	+0.17	0 / 300	0	21st	Extra-parliamentary	Collective leadership
Jun 2012	7,952	0.12%	–0.13	0 / 300	0	17th	Extra-parliamentary	Collective leadership
Jan 2015	7,999	0.13%	+0.01	0 / 300	0	14th	Extra-parliamentary	Collective leadership
Sep 2015	8,873	0.16%	+0.03	0 / 300	0	15th	Extra-parliamentary	Collective leadership
2019	2,706	0.05%	–0.11	0 / 300	0	16th	Extra-parliamentary	Collective leadership
May 2023	3,926	0.07%	+0.02	0 / 300	0	29th	Extra-parliamentary	Collective leadership
Jun 2023	4,296	0,08%	+0.01	0 / 300	0	21st	Extra-parliamentary	Collective leadership

=== European Parliament ===
European Parliament
Election	Votes	%	±pp	Seats won	+/−	Rank	Leader	EP Group
1994	9,639	0.15	New	0 / 22	New	15th	Collective Leadership	−
1999	16,782	0.26	+0.11	0 / 22	0	14th	Collective Leadership	−
2004	21,220	0.35	+0.09	0 / 22	0	11th	Collective Leadership	−
2009	13,138	0.26	-0.09	0 / 22	0	15th	Collective Leadership	−
2014	10,771	0.19	-0.05	0 / 21	0	27th	Collective Leadership	−
2019	12,231	0.22	+0.03	0 / 21	0	29th	Collective Leadership	−
2024	6,836	0.17	-0.05	0 / 21	0	27th	Collective Leadership	−

== See also ==
- List of anti-revisionist groups
- List of communist parties
