= Nikos Kouzilos =

Greek politician

Nikos Kouzilos (Greek: Νίκος Κούζηλος, born in 1977 in the district of Manitica) is a Greek politician and convicted criminal. He is a former member of the Greek Parliament for the Golden Dawn.

In 2014, he was also candidate for mayor in Piraeus.
