= Dimitris Vitsas =

Greek politician

- Δημήτρης Βίτσας
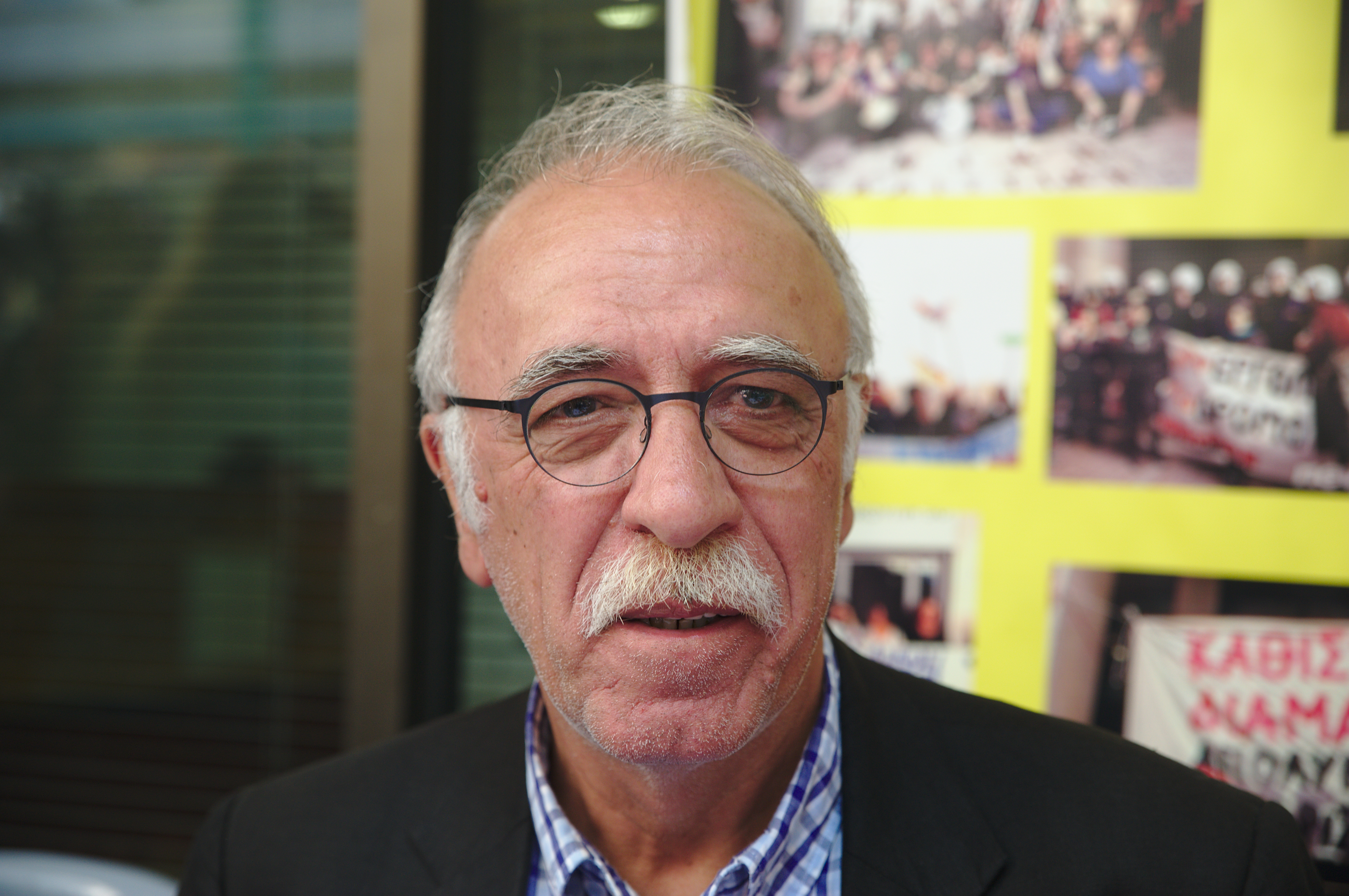
- Dimitris Vitsas in 2015

Fourth Vice President of the Hellenic Parliament
- In office 8 July 2019 – 22 April 2023
- President: Konstantinos Tasoulas
- Prime Minister: Kyriakos Mitsotakis
- Preceded by: Nikitas Kaklamanis

Minister for Immigration Policy of Greece
- In office 28 February 2018 – 9 July 2019
- Prime Minister: Alexis Tsipras
- Preceded by: Ioannis Mouzalas
- Succeeded by: Giorgos Koumoutsakos

Member of the Greek Parliament
- In office 25 January 2015 – 22 April 2023

Personal details
- Born: 6 July 1956 (age 69) Keratsini, Greece
- Party: Keratsini
- Occupation: Politician

Dimitris Vitsas (Greek: Δημήτρης Βίτσας; born 6 July 1956) is a Greek politician. He was a member of the Syriza party, Minister of Immigration Policy and Deputy Minister of National Defence.

== Biography ==
Vitsas was born in 1956 in Keratsini. He studied law in Athens and has worked as a private clerk.

In 1974, he joined the KNE and then the KKE, from which he left in 1991.

Vitsas then joined Synaspismos, where he was secretary of the Central Political Committee from 2009 to 2013. In July 2013, when SYRIZA was formed as a single party, he was elected secretary of the Central Committee.

In the January 2015 elections, he was elected as a deputy in the Athens B Electoral constituency and in the September 2015 elections he was elected in the Piraeus B Electoral constituency.

On 18 July 2015, he became Deputy Minister of National Defence following the resignation of Kostas Isichos. On 28 February 2018, he became Minister of Immigration Policy, a position he held until 9 July 2019.

In the 2019 parliamentary elections, he was elected as a member of parliament in the B2' West Sector of Athens. In the resulting Parliament, he was elected as the 4th Vice President, a position he held until 2023.

In the parliamentary elections of May and June 2023, he ran again, but was not elected.
