= Communist Party of Greece (Marxist–Leninist) =

Communist Party of Greece (Marxist–Leninist) Κομμουνιστικό Κόμμα Ελλάδας (μαρξιστικό–λενινιστικό)
- Abbreviation: KKE (m-l)
- Founded: November 1976
- Split from: OMLE
- Headquarters: Athens, Greece
- Newspaper: Proletariaki Simaia
- Ideology: Communism; Marxism–Leninism; Maoism
- Political position: Far-left
- Colours: Red
- Parliament: 0 / 300
- European Parliament: 0 / 21

Party flag
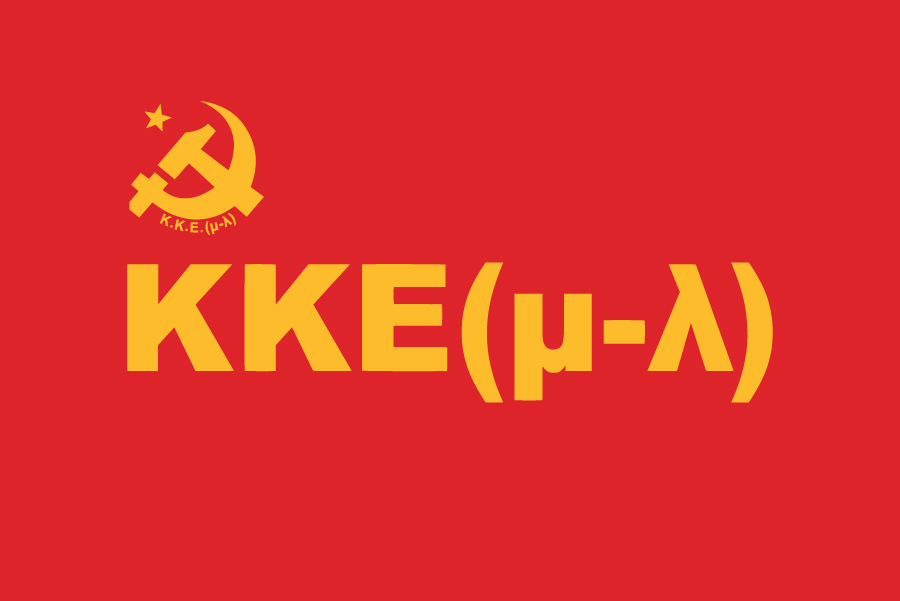

Website
- kkeml.gr

The Communist Party of Greece (Marxist–Leninist) (Greek: Κομμουνιστικό Κόμμα Ελλάδας (μαρξιστικό-λενινιστικό), ΚΚΕ (μ-λ), Kommounistiko Komma Elladas (marxistiko-leninistiko), KKE (m-l)) is a Maoist communist political party in Greece.

== History ==
KKE (m-l) was founded in November 1976 by the majority of the Organisation of Marxists-Leninists of Greece (OMLE), itself a splinter group of the Communist Party of Greece since 1964. The minority became the Marxist-Leninist Communist Party of Greece (M-L KKE). Despite further subsequent splits and the creation of smaller groupings, the two parties, KKE (m-l) and M-L KKE, have remained the major representatives of Maoism in Greece to this day. The student wing of KKE (m-l) was the Progressive All-Student Unionist Camp (PPSP), which was "less popular [than the mainstream organisations], but still important" at Greek universities at the time.

In October 1977, on the eve of the first death anniversary of Mao Zedong, KKE(m-l) co-signed a declaration with the Communist Party of Germany/Marxists–Leninists, Communist Party of Spain (Marxist–Leninist), Communist Party of Italy (Marxist–Leninist) and the Portuguese Communist Party (Reconstructed). The declaration, which was published on the front page of the Albanian daily Zëri i Popullit, rejected the Three Worlds Theory.

KKE (m-l) experienced a crisis in 1982 when the majority of its members left the party. This crisis was caused as a result of both international (death of Mao Zedong, the restoration of capitalism in China, etc.) and national events (government of PASOK, etc.). So the members that fighter that crisis created the new KKE (m-l)

On 16 March 2012, spurred by the ongoing Greek financial crisis, M-L KKE and KKE (m-l) announced that they would jointly contest elections as part of the Popular Resistance - Left Anti-Imperialist Cooperation (Λαϊκή Αντίσταση - Αριστερή Αντιμπεριαλιστική Συνεργασία), distancing themselves both from the traditional Communist Party of Greece (KKE) and the leftist Syriza coalition. KKE(m-l) and MLKKE contested the May 2012 legislative election under the slogan "Down with the Memorandum of Enslavement- The People don't owe anyone anything" and fielded 186 candidates across the country.

Historically, KKE (m-l) has been most active and has supporters in Ioannina, Thessaloniki, and Northern Greece in general, in Crete, and the Aegean islands of Lesbos and Samos.

== Election results ==
=== Hellenic Parliament ===
Election	Hellenic Parliament					Rank	Government	Leader
Election	Votes	%	±pp	Seats won	+/−	Rank	Government	Leader
Jun 1989	3,350	0.05%	New	0 / 300	New	18th	Extra-parliamentary	Collective leadership
Nov 1989	3,188	0.05%	±0.00	0 / 300	0	12th	Extra-parliamentary	Collective leadership
1990	2,590	0.04%	–0.01	0 / 300	0	22nd	Extra-parliamentary	Collective leadership
1993 (Note: Run as part of the Left Struggle coalition.)	8,160	0.12%	+0.08	0 / 300	0	10th	Extra-parliamentary	Collective leadership
1996	10,416	0.15%	+0.03	0 / 300	0	12th	Extra-parliamentary	Collective leadership
2000	7,325	0.11%	–0.04	0 / 300	0	12th	Extra-parliamentary	Collective leadership
2004	10,864	0.15%	+0.04	0 / 300	0	9th	Extra-parliamentary	Collective leadership
2007	17,555	0.25%	+0.10	0 / 300	0	9th	Extra-parliamentary	Collective leadership
2009	10,480	0.15%	–0.10	0 / 300	0	13th	Extra-parliamentary	Collective leadership
May 2012 (Note: Run in coalition with M-L KKE.)	16,010	0.25%	+0.10	0 / 300	0	21st	Extra-parliamentary	Collective leadership
Jun 2012	7,952	0.12%	–0.13	0 / 300	0	17th	Extra-parliamentary	Collective leadership
Jan 2015	7,999	0.13%	+0.01	0 / 300	0	14th	Extra-parliamentary	Collective leadership
Sep 2015	8,873	0.16%	+0.03	0 / 300	0	15th	Extra-parliamentary	Collective leadership
2019	7,760	0.14%	–0.02	0 / 300	0	15th	Extra-parliamentary	Collective leadership
May 2023	12,773	0.22%	+0.08	0 / 300	0	22nd	Extra-parliamentary	Collective leadership
Jun 2023	9,447	0.18%	–0.04	0 / 300	0	19th	Extra-parliamentary	Collective leadership

== Newspaper ==
A sample cover of Proletariaki Simaia (January 26, 2008)

KKE (m-l) publishes the biweekly newspaper, Proletariaki Simaia (Προλεταριακή Σημαία, "Proletarian Flag"), founded in early 1967 as one of the newspapers of OMLE.

== See also ==
- List of anti-revisionist groups
