= Organisation of Marxists–Leninists of Greece =

Organisation of Marxists–Leninists of Greece Οργάνωση Μαρξιστών Λενινιστών Ελλάδας
- Founded: 1964
- Dissolved: 1976
- Split from: KKE
- Succeeded by: KKE (M-L); M-L KKE
- Ideology: Communism; Marxism-Leninism; Maoism; Anti-revisionism
- Political position: Far-left

The Organisation of Marxists–Leninists of Greece (Greek: Οργάνωση Μαρξιστών Λενινιστών Ελλάδας), known by its Greek acronym OMLE (ΟΜΛΕ), was a Greek anti-revisionist Marxist-Leninist political movement, which split from the Communist Party of Greece in 1964, opposing Soviet revisionism. The group remained loyal to the Soviets, and supported Moscow's 1968 military action.

OMLE emerged from the merger of exiled Greek communist in the former Soviet Union and the other Eastern bloc countries with a Greek communist group which was publishing the magazine Anagenisi (Greek: Αναγέννηση, 'Renaissance'). During the military government, the organization operated illegally in Greece.

Between 1974 and 1976, OMLE was aligned with progressive student groups, such as the Progressive All-Student Unionist Camp. After Mao Zedong's death, in 1976, OMLE came into a major crisis and split in two major parties: Communist Party of Greece (Marxist-Leninist) and the Marxist-Leninist Communist Party of Greece, the latter party following the Three Worlds Theory.

== See also ==
- List of anti-revisionist groups
- Communist Party of Greece/Marxist–Leninist
- Communist Party of Greece (KKE)
