= Syriza =

Political party in Greece

Coalition of the Radical Left – Progressive Alliance Συνασπισμός Ριζοσπαστικής Αριστεράς – Προοδευτική Συμμαχία Sinaspismós Rizospastikís Aristerás – Proodeftikí Simachía
- Abbreviation: SYRIZA; ΣΥΡΙΖΑ
- President: Vacant
- General Secretary: Nikos Pappas
- Parliamentary group Leader: Rena Dourou
- Parliamentary group Secretary: Giannis Amanatidis
- Parliamentary Representatives: Theofilos Xanthopoulos
- Press Representative: Christos Giannoulis
- Founded: 15 January 2004; 22 years ago
- Registered: 22 May 2012; 14 years ago
- Preceded by: Synaspismos
- Headquarters: Eleftherias Sq. 1, 105 53 Athens
- Newspaper: I Avgi
- Think tank: Nicos Poulantzas Institute
- Youth wing: SYRIZA Youth
- Membership (2023): 190,000
- Ideology: Social democracy; Progressivism; Pro-Europeanism; Historical: Left-wing populism Soft Euroscepticism
- Political position: Centre-left to left-wing
- European affiliation: Party of the European Left
- European Parliament group: The Left in the European Parliament
- Colours: Pink
- Hellenic Parliament: 12 / 300
- European Parliament: 2 / 21

Party flag

Website
- syriza.gr

The Coalition of the Radical Left – Progressive Alliance, (Note: Greek: Συνασπισμός Ριζοσπαστικής Αριστεράς – Προοδευτική Συμμαχία, romanized: Synaspismós Rizospastikís Aristerás – Proodeftikí Symmachía) best known by the syllabic abbreviation SYRIZA, (Note: /ˈsɪrɪzə/ SIH-rih-zə; Greek: ΣΥΡΙΖΑ [ˈsiriza]; a pun on the Greek adverb σύρριζα, meaning "from the roots" or "radically") is a centre-left to left-wing political party in Greece. It was originally founded in 2004 as a political coalition of left-wing parties, and registered as a political party in 2012.

A progressive party, Syriza holds a pro-European stance. Syriza also advocates for alter-globalisation, LGBT rights, and secularism. In the past, SYRIZA was described as a typical left-wing populist party, but this was disputed after its 2015-2019 government term, and its opposition since 2019.

Following the failure on June 2023 Greek legislative elections, Alexis Tsipras resigned, elections were held, and Stefanos Kasselakis assumed the presidency in September 2023. Dissatisfaction with Kasselakis led the party to a prolonged internal crisis, resulting in a motion of no confidence and new elections scheduled for November 2024, in which Sokratis Famellos was elected president. Famellos resigned in July 2026, and the party presidency has been vacant since.

== History ==
=== Formation ===
Although Syriza was launched in 2004, before that year's legislative election, the roots of the process that led to its formation can be traced back to the Space for Dialogue for the Unity and Common Action of the Left (Greek: Χώρος Διαλόγου για την Ενότητα και Κοινή Δράση της Αριστεράς, Chóros Dialógou gia tin Enótita kai Koiní Drási tis Aristerás) in 2001. It was made up of various organizations of the Greek political left, that, despite different ideological and historical backgrounds, held common ground in several important issues that had arisen in Greece in the late 1990s, such as the Kosovo War, privatizations of state businesses, and social and civil rights.

The Space provided the ground from which participating parties could work together on issues such as their opposition to the neoliberal reform of the pension and social security systems, and the new anti-terrorism legislation, a review of the role of the European Union and a redetermination of Greece's position in it, and the preparation of the Greek participation at the 27th G8 summit in 2001. Even though it was not a political organization, but rather an effort to bring together the parties and organizations that attended, the Space gave birth to some electoral alliances for the 2002 Greek local elections, the most successful being the one led by Manolis Glezos for the super-prefecture of Athens-Piraeus. As part of the larger European Social Forum, the Space also provided the ground from which several of the member parties and organizations launched the Greek Social Forum.

==== 2004 legislative election ====
The defining moment for the birth of Syriza came in the 2004 legislative election. Most of the participants of the Space sought to develop a common platform that could potentially lead to an electoral alliance. This led to the eventual formation of the Coalition of the Radical Left in January 2004.

The parties that had formed the Coalition of the Radical Left in January 2004 were the Coalition of Left, of Movements and Ecology (Synaspismos or SYN), the Renewing Communist Ecological Left (AKOA), the Internationalist Workers Left (DEA), the Movement for the Unity of Action of the Left (KEDA), which was a splinter group of the Communist Party of Greece (KKE), Active Citizens, which was a political organisation associated with Manolis Glezos, and other independent left-wing groups or activists. Although the Communist Organisation of Greece (KOE) had participated in the Space, it decided not to take part in the Coalition of the Radical Left.

In the legislative election, the coalition gathered 241,539 votes (3.3% of the total) and elected six members to parliament. All six were members of Synaspismos, the largest of the coalition parties, which led to a lot of tension within the coalition.

==== Crisis and revitalization ====
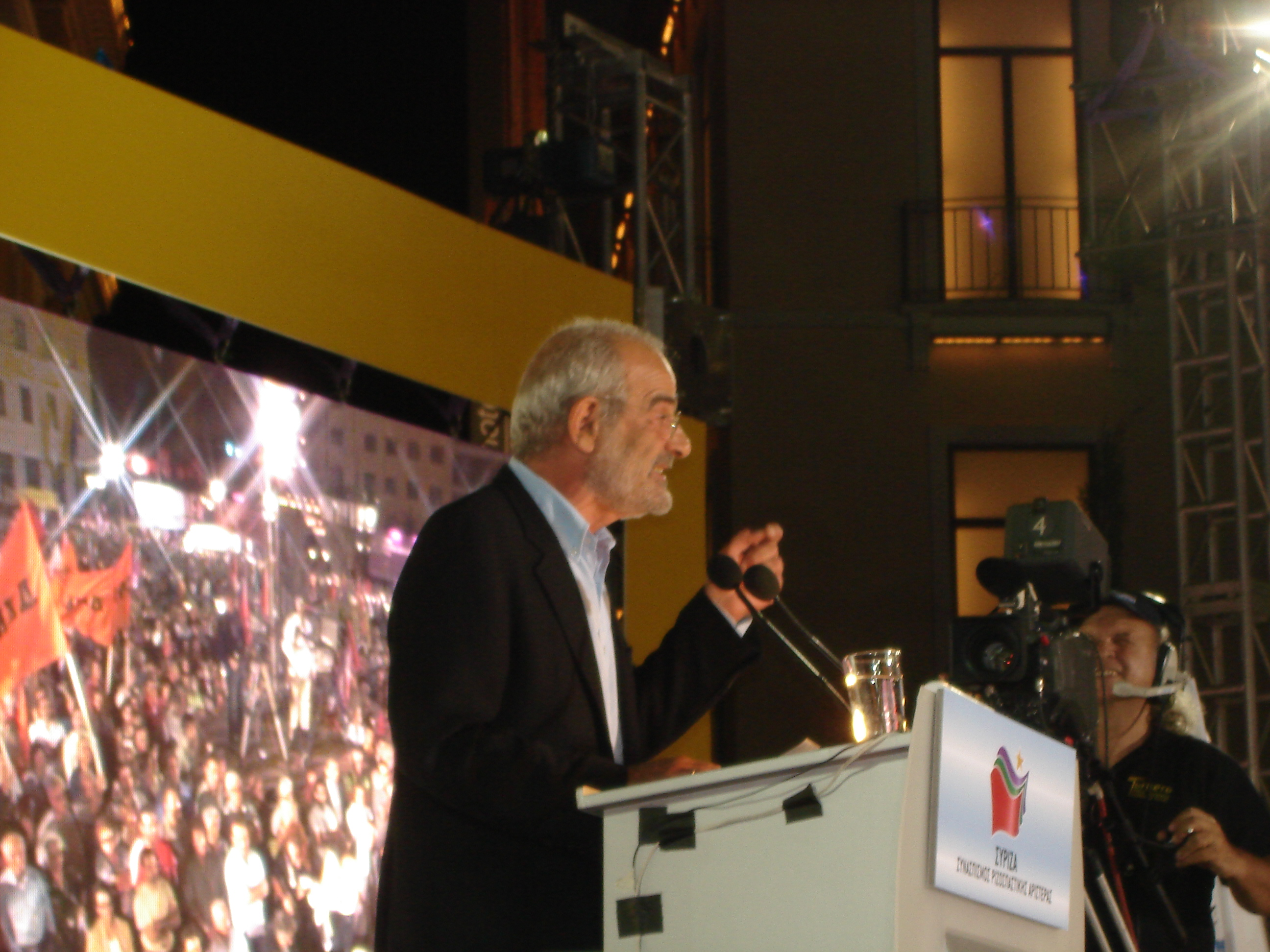
Former leader of Syriza, Alekos Alavanos, speaking in Athens in 2007

After the 2004 legislative election, the smaller parties accused Synaspismos of not honoring an agreement to have one of its members of parliament resign so that Yannis Banias of the AKOA could take his seat. Tension built up and resulted in the split of the Internationalist Workers Left and the formation of Kokkino (Red), both of which remained within the coalition. The frame of the crisis within SYRIZA was the reluctance of Synaspismos to adopt and maintain the political agreement for a clear denial of centre-left politics.

Three months after the 2004 legislative election, Synaspismos chose to run independently from the rest of the coalition for the 2004 European Parliament election in Greece and some of the smaller parties of the coalition supported the feminist Women for Another Europe (Greek: Γυναίκες για μια Άλλη Ευρώπη, Gynaíkes gia mia Álli Evrópi) list.

The crisis ended in December 2004 with the 4th convention of Synaspismos, when a large majority within the party voted for the continuation of the coalition. This change of attitude was further intensified with the election of Alekos Alavanos, a staunch supporter of the coalition, as president of Synaspismos, after its former leader, Nikos Konstantopoulos, stepped down.

The coalition was further strengthened by the organization in May 2006 of the 4th European Social Forum in Athens, and by a number of largely successful election campaigns, such as those in Athens and Piraeus, during the 2006 Greek local elections. The coalition ticket in the municipality of Athens was headed by Alexis Tsipras, proposed by Alavanos who declared Synaspismos' "opening to the new generation".

==== 2007 legislative election ====
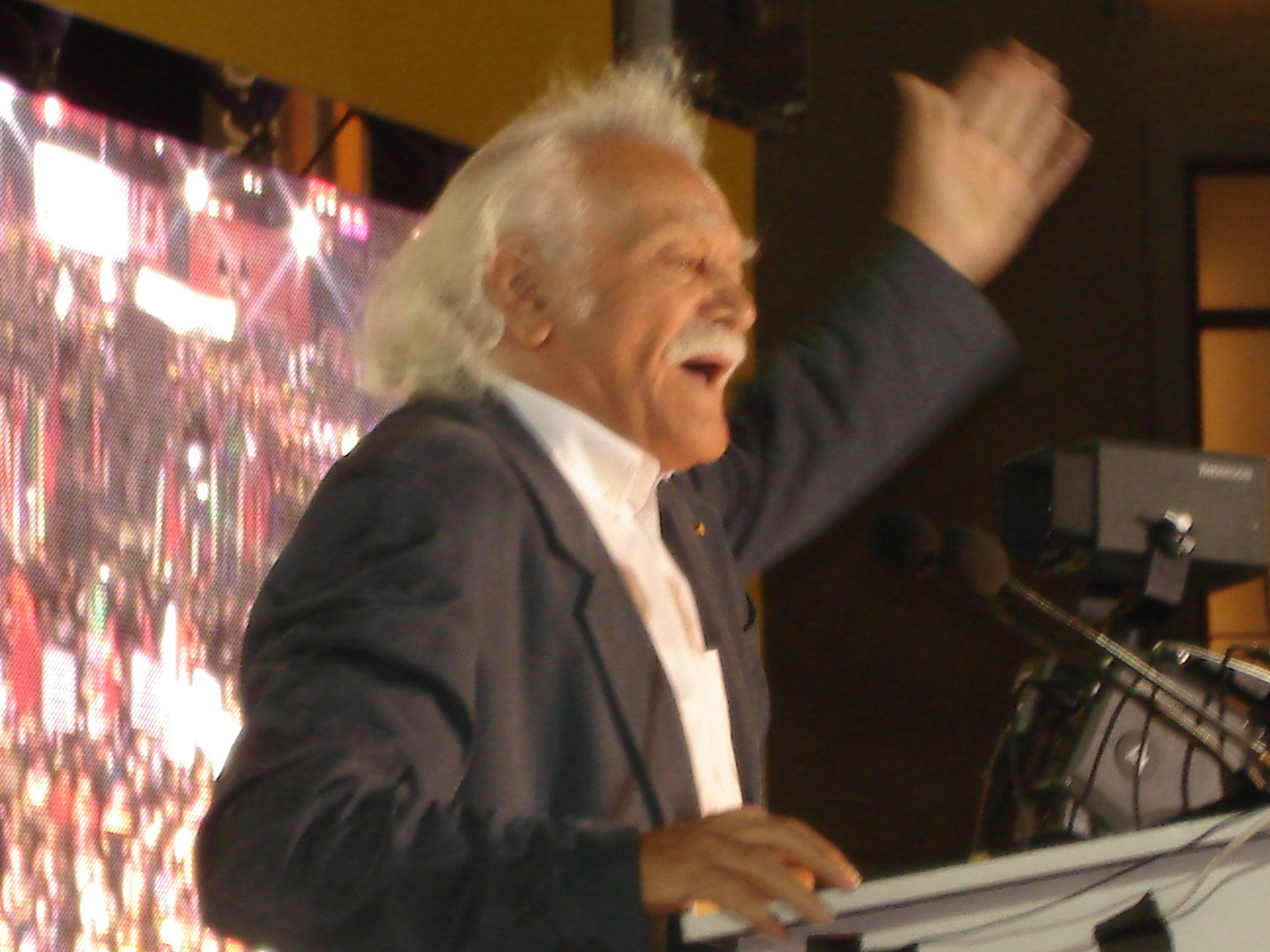
Manolis Glezos during the 2007 elections

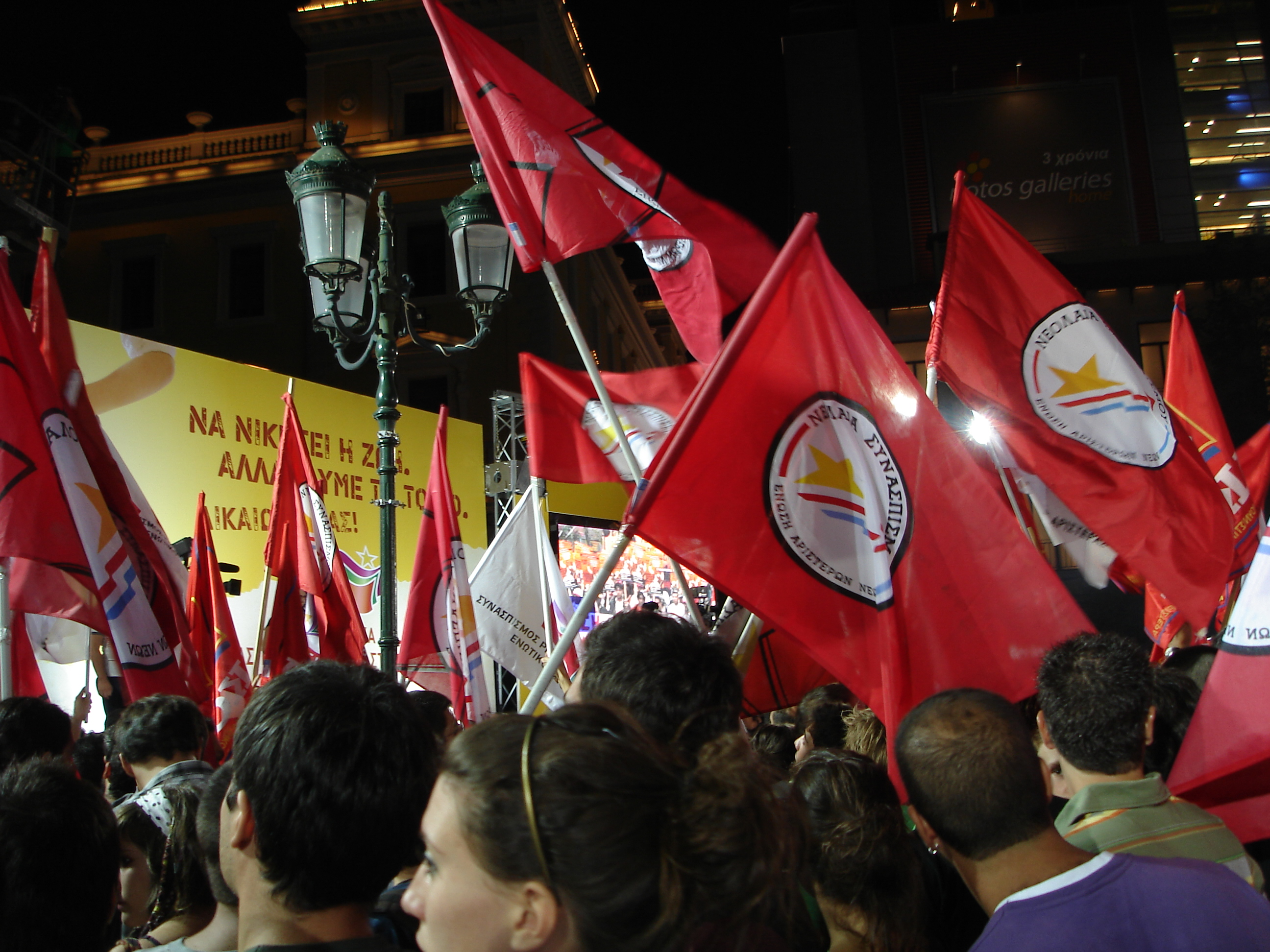
Party's youth in 2007

Opinion polls had indicated that Syriza was expected to make significant gains in the election, with predictions ranging from 4% to 5% of the electorate. On 16 September, it gained 5.0% of the vote in the 2007 legislative election.

Prior to the election, the participating parties had agreed on a common declaration by 22 June. The signed Declaration of the Coalition of the Radical Left outlined the common platform on which it would compete in the following election and outlined the basis for the political alliance. The coalition of 2007 has also expanded from its original composition in 2004. On 20 June 2007, the KOE announced its participation into the coalition. On 21 August, the environmentalist Ecological Intervention (Greek: Οικολογική Παρέμβαση, Oikologikí Parémvasi) also joined, and the Democratic Social Movement (DIKKI) also announced its participation in the coalition on 22 August 2007.

On 2 September, the Areios Pagos refused to include the title of DIKKI in the Syriza electoral alliance, saying that the internal procedures followed by DIKKI were flawed. This was criticized by Syriza and DIKKI as inappropriate interference by the courts in party political activity.

==== 2007–2011 elections and developments ====
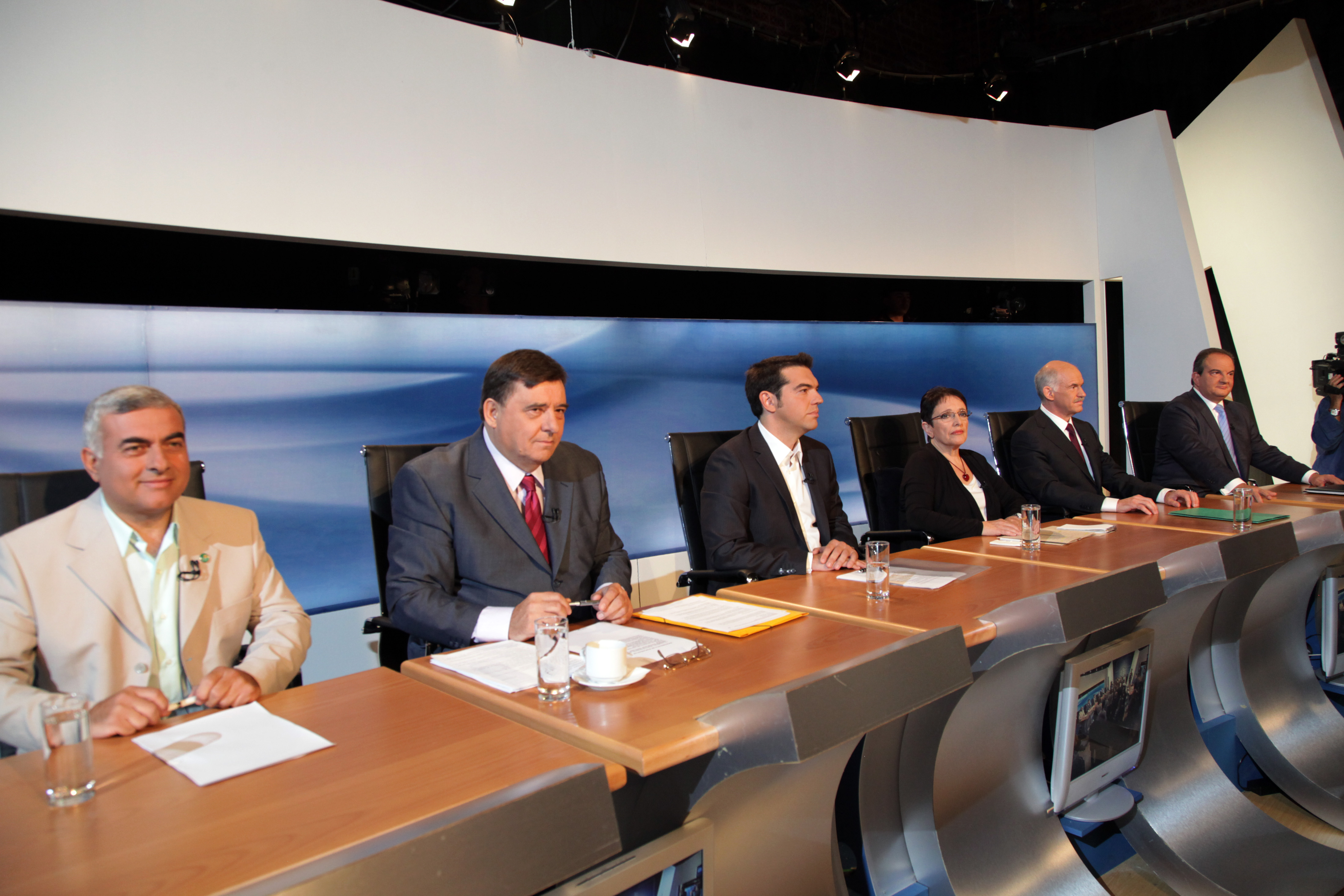
Six party leaders' televised debate ahead of the 2009 legislative elections. Alexis Tsipras, the leader of Syriza, is in the centre.

On 27 November 2007, Alavanos announced that, for private reasons, he would not be seeking to renew his presidency of Synaspismos. The 5th party congress of Synaspismos elected Alexis Tsipras, a municipal councillor for the municipality of Athens, as party president on 10 February 2008. Alavanos retained the parliamentary leadership of Syriza, as Tsipras was not at that time a member of parliament. Tsipras achieved considerable popularity with the Greek electorate, which led to a surge in support for Syriza in opinion polls, up to 18 percent of the vote at its peak.

At the end of June 2008, Start – Socialist Internationalist Organisation (Greek: Ξεκίνημα – Σοσιαλιστική Διεθνιστική Οργάνωση, Xekínima – Sosialistiké Diethnistikí Orgánosi) announced that it would join the coalition.

During the run-up to the 2009 European Parliament election in Greece, Syriza, amid turbulent internal developments, saw its poll share decrease to 4.7%, with the result that only one Syriza candidate (Nikos Hountis) was elected to the European Parliament. This caused renewed internal strife, leading to the resignation of former Synaspismos president Alekos Alavanos from his seat in the Greek parliament, a resignation that was withdrawn a few days later.

In the 2009 Greek legislative election held on 4 October, Syriza won 4.6% of the vote (slightly below its 2007 showing), returning thirteen MPs to the Hellenic Parliament. The incoming MPs included Tsipras, who took over as Syriza's parliamentary leader.

In June 2010, Ananeotiki (Reformist Wing) of radical social democrats in Synapsismós split away from the party, at the same time leaving Syriza. This reduced Syriza's parliamentary group to nine MPs. The four MPs who left formed a new party, the Democratic Left (DIMAR).

==== 2012 general elections ====
In a move of voters away from the parties which participated in the coalition government under the premiership of Lucas Papademos in November 2011, Syriza gained popular support in the opinion polls, as did the KKE and DIMAR. Opinion polls in the run-up to the May 2012 election showed Syriza with 10–12% support. The minor Unitary Movement (a PASOK splinter group) also joined the coalition in March 2012.

In the first legislative election held on 6 May, the party polled over 16% and quadrupled its number of seats, becoming the second largest party in parliament, behind New Democracy (ND). After the election, Tsipras was invited by the president of Greece to try to form a government but failed, as he could not muster the necessary number of parliamentarians. Subsequently, Tsipras rejected a proposal by the president to join a coalition government with the centre-right and centre-left parties.

For the second legislative election held on 17 June, Syriza re-registered as a single party (adding the United Social Front moniker) as its previous coalition status would have disqualified it from receiving the 50 "bonus" seats given to the largest polling party under the Greek electoral system. Although Syriza increased its share of the vote to just under 27%, ND polled 29.8% and claimed the bonus. With 71 seats, Syriza became the main opposition party to a coalition government composed of ND, PASOK, and DIMAR. Tsipras subsequently formed a Shadow Cabinet in July 2012.

=== Unitary party ===
In July 2013, a Syriza congress was held to discuss the organisation of the party. Important outcomes included a decision in principle to dissolve the participating parties in Syriza in favour of a unitary party. However, implementation was deferred for three months to allow time for four of the parties which were reluctant to dissolve to consider their positions. Tsipras was confirmed as chairman with 74% of the vote. Delegates supporting the Left Platform (Greek: Αριστερή Πλάτφορμα, Aristerí Plátforma) led by Panayiotis Lafazanis, which wanted to leave the door open to quitting the euro, secured 30% (60) of the seats on Syriza's central committee. A modest success was also claimed by the Communist Platform (Greek section of the International Marxist Tendency), who managed to get two members elected to the party's central committee.

In its founding declaration, Syriza presented itself as a radical alternative, stating that

"The body we are establishing is a pluralistic body, open to the existence of different ideological, historical and value sensitivities and currents of thought. It is anchored by class in the labor and wider popular movement, but also with explicit feminist and ecological goals. It is already gathering forces and currents of the communist, radical, renewalist, anti-capitalist, revolutionary and libertarian Left of all shades, left-wing socialists, democrats, forces of left-wing feminism and radical ecology. Because it respects and considers differences like the above to be its wealth, it recognizes the possibility of different political considerations and provides ground for both these sensitivities and these considerations to be cultivated seamlessly and represented in the internal democracy, always aiming at promotional compositions. The organization we are establishing is an organization that systematically takes care of the theoretical understanding of social and historical development and the theoretical education of its members. It draws on Marxist and more broadly emancipatory thought and its history and tries to elaborate it further, making use of every important theoretical contribution."

==== 2014 elections ====
Local elections and elections to the European Parliament were held in May 2014. In the 2014 European Parliament election in Greece on 25 May, Syriza reached first place with 26.5% of vote, ahead of ND at 22.7%. The position in the local elections was less clear-cut, due to the number of non-party local tickets and independents contending for office. Syriza's main success was the election of Rena Dourou to the Attica Regional governorship with 50.8% of the second-round vote over the incumbent Yiannis Sgouros. Its biggest disappointment was the failure of Gabriel Sakellaridis to win the Athens Mayoralty election, being beaten in the second ballot by Giorgos Kaminis with 51.4% to his 48.6%.

==== Thessaloniki Programme ====
On 13 September 2014, Syriza unveiled the Thessaloniki Programme, a set of policy proposals containing its central demands for economic and political restructuring.

==== January 2015 election ====
The Hellenic Parliament failed to elect a new president of State by 29 December 2014, and was dissolved. A snap legislative election was scheduled for 25 January 2015. Syriza had a lead in opinion polls, but its anti-austerity position worried investors and eurozone supporters. The party's chief economic advisor, John Milios, downplayed fears that Greece under a Syriza government would exit the eurozone while shadow development minister George Stathakis disclosed the party's intention to crack down on Greek oligarchs if it wins the election. In the election, Syriza defeated the incumbent ND and became the largest party in the Hellenic Parliament, receiving 36.3% of the vote and 149 out of 300 seats.

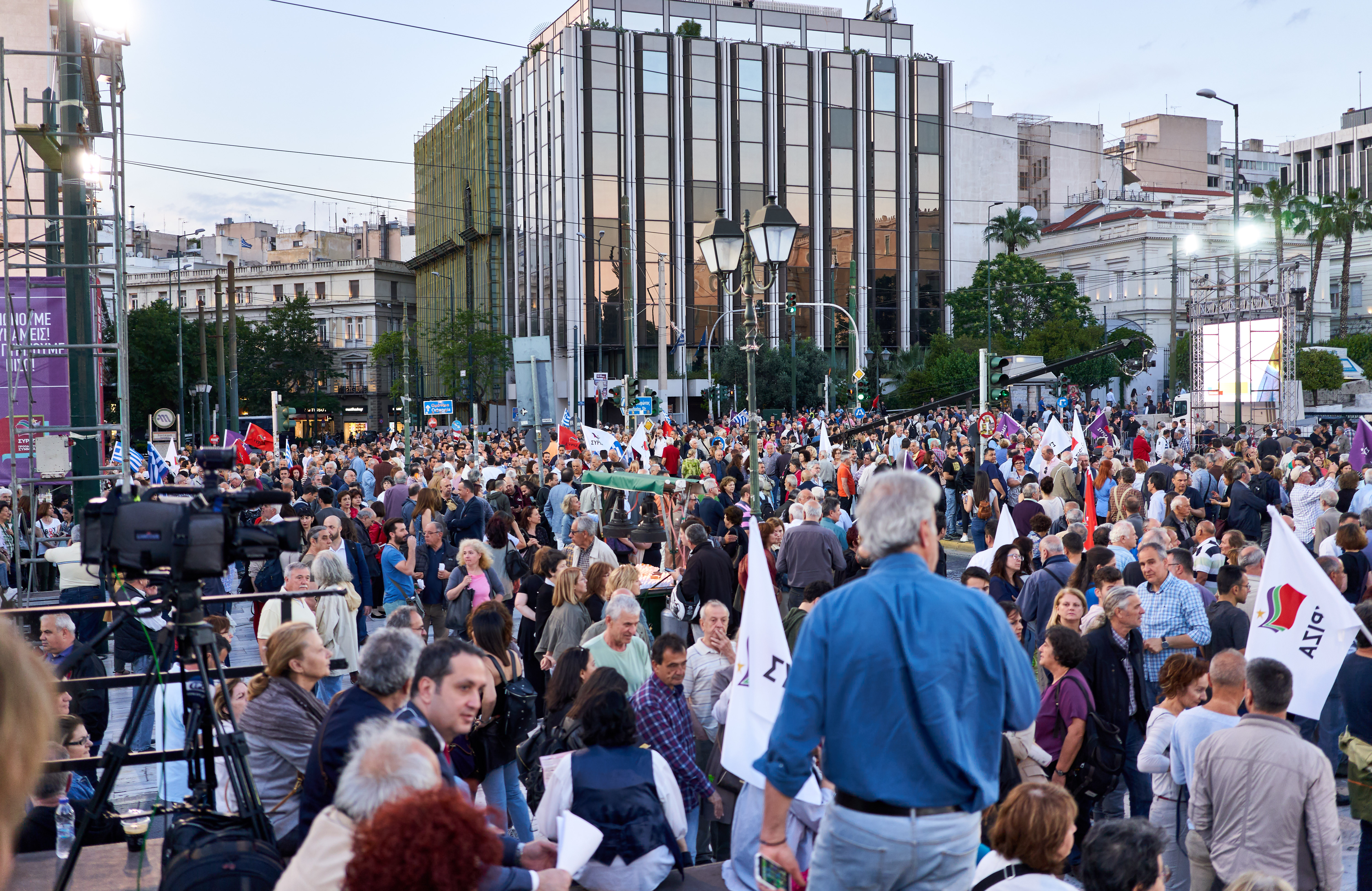
Syriza rally in Athens, May 2019

Tsipras was congratulated by French president François Hollande who stressed Greco-French friendship, as well as by leftist leaders all over Europe, including Pablo Iglesias Turrión of Spain's Podemos and Katja Kipping of Germany's Die Linke. German government official Hans-Peter Friedrich said: "The Greeks have the right to vote for whomever they want. We have the right to no longer finance Greek debt." The Financial Times and Radio Free Europe reported on Syriza's ties with Russia and extensive correspondence with the Russian political scientist Aleksandr Dugin. Early in the SYRIZA-led government of Greece, the Russian president Vladimir Putin and Tsipras concluded a face-to-face meeting by announcing an agreement on boosting investment ties between the two nations. Tsipras also said that Greece would seek to mend ties between Russia and European Union through European institutions. Tsipras also said that Greece was not in favor of international sanctions imposed on Russia, adding that it risked the start of another Cold War.

==== Government formation ====
On 26 January 2015, Tsipras and Independent Greeks (ANEL) leader Panos Kammenos agreed to form a coalition government of Syriza and ANEL, with Tsipras becoming Prime Minister of Greece and Greek-Australian economist Yanis Varoufakis appointed Minister of Finance and Panos Kammenos appointed Minister of Defence. In July 2015, Yanis Varoufakis was replaced by Euclid Tsakalotos as Minister of Finance.

==== Party split and September 2015 election ====
Following the acceptance of the third memorandum with the institutions on Greece's debt by Tsipras and the Syriza government, 25 Syriza MPs who rejected the terms of the bailout, including the party's Left Platform and the Internationalist Workers Left faction, split to form a new party Popular Unity (Greek: Λαϊκή Ενότητα, Laïkí Enótita, LE). They were led by Panagiotis Lafazanis. Many other activists left Syriza at this time. International supporters of Syriza were divided, as some of its erstwhile backers felt that the party betrayed its voters and those abroad who had seen a radical promise in the party. Author and communist activist Helena Sheehan wrote that "Syriza was a horizon of hope. Now it is a vortex of despair."

Having lost his majority in parliament, Tsipras resigned as prime minister on 20 August 2015, and called for fresh elections on September 20. Although polls suggested a close contest between Syriza and ND, Syriza led ND by 7%, winning 145 seats; LE polled below the 3% threshold and had no parliamentary representation. Tsipras renewed Syriza's previous coalition agreement with ANEL, giving the new government 155 seats out of 300 in parliament.

==== 2019 elections ====
On 26 May, following losses in the 2019 European Parliament election and the concurrent local elections, Tsipras announced a snap election. During the legislative election in September, the party was defeated by ND. Following the result, Syriza moved into opposition.

==== 2023 elections ====
Following a full, four-year term as the official opposition and despite polls suggesting a difference of 6 to 7% between Syriza and ND, Syriza lost the May election by a wide margin of 20.7%, retaining second position. As ND was unable to form a parliamentary majority, owing to the simple proportionality system passed by Syriza in 2016 that required 47% or more, a caretaker government was formed to lead the country to a second, snap election. In the June election, Syriza regressed to 17.83%, 2.24% lower than its May results, with ND losing only 0.23%, in an election marred by low turnout.

Even though Syriza did retain second place-and official opposition status, Tsipras resigned as party leader 4 days after the election, stating that he would remain involved in the party. Stefanos Kasselakis was elected leader, defeating Efi Achtsioglou in the second round. After winning the leadership election, Kasselakis said that he wanted Syriza to emulate the U.S. Democratic Party and move to the centre-left.

==== Kasselakis election and splits ====
Upon taking office, Kasselakis began a redefinition of the party's positions. He rejected many of the old leftist positions of the party and formulated the view of a modern, patriotic, leftist party. He set himself the goal of unmediated contact with voters, bypassing the party organs. Kasselakis accused many members of the party organs of being bureaucrats who exclude grassroots communication with the party. His business background, his lightning-fast rise, and the publication of his earlier writings supporting Kyriakos Mitsotakis and New Democracy have brought him into conflict with prominent party members and former ministers. Members of the party's internal opposition called him alt-right, and likened him to Donald Trump and Beppe Grillo, leading to their expulsion from the party. At the Central Committee meeting, Kasselakis again attacked the party organs and the entire internal opposition, leading to the departure of Umbrella, the party's left-wing tendency, 45 Central Committee members, and two MPs. On 16 November, MEP Petros S. Kokkalis announced his departure from the party with the intention of founding a Green party, later founding the party Kosmos. On 23 November 2023, nine MPs, one MEP, and 57 central committee members announced their withdrawal from the party. Among them, were former minister Efi Achtsioglou, the main opponent of Kasselakis in the internal party elections, and other former ministers. Commenting on the split, Kasselakis stressed that a cycle of introversion is closing. In November 2023, SYRIZA was polling in third place for the first time in over eleven years. In early December 2023, those that split from the party formed the New Left party.

==== 2024 European Parliament election ====
The 2024 European parliament election was the first electoral test for Stefanos Kasselakis as leader of the party, and the first set of European Elections since Brexit. Syriza failed to increase its percentage from the 2023 legislative election and failed to win any provinces. Due to the fall in support for New Democracy, Syriza managed to close the difference in vote share between the two largest parties from over 20% in the legislative elections to 13.3%.

The weakened position of the government and the failure of PASOK to re-establish itself as the principal opposition led to talks of a united centre-left between PASOK and Syriza, who are currently considering a plan to have a shared list in the next legislative election in 2027. Major supporters of this are Nikos Pappas from Syriza and Haris Doukas from PASOK.

==== Motion of no confidence against Kasselakis and aftermath ====
On 7 September 2024, 100 members of the party's central committee tabled a censure motion against Stefanos Kasselakis after he had rejected their initial request for new elections. The members who submitted the motion blamed the leader for the party's shift to the right and further electoral decline. The next day the proposal was supported by 163 members out of a total of 300 and Stefanos Kasselakis was declared out of office.

New Syriza leadership elections were on 24 November 2024. The leadership candidates were MP Pavlos Polakis, Sokratis Famellos, MEP Nikolas Farantouris, and former mayor/actor Apostolos Gletsos. After his candidature was rejected by the Central Committee and the Extraordinary Congress, Kasselakis exited Syriza and announced the creation of a new party, founding the Movement for Democracy. Kassealkis's new party prompted immediate withdrawal of five MPs from Syriza's parliamentary group: Petros Pappas, Kyriaki Malama, Rallia Christidou, Alexandros Avlonitis, and Theodora Tzakri. Avlonitis and Tzakri joined Kasselakis' new patty, while Pappas joined PASOK. The move left Syriza with less MPs than PASOK – Movement for Change, rendering the latter the official opposition.

Famellos was elected leader of Syriza after the November election.

In May 2026, former Syriza leader Alexis Tsipras launched a new party, called Greek Left Alliance (ELAS). The central committee of Syriza voted to stand with Tsipras' project.

On 17 May, President Sokratis Famellos expelled Pavlos Polakis from the parliamentary caucus due to his posts criticizing the party leadership. On 9 July 2026, following ELAS's refusal to cooperate with SYRIZA, Famellos submitted his resignation. This was preceded by the resignations of the party's press secretary and central committee secretary. Later in July, the Deputy Secretary, the Deputy Press Spokesperson, the leadership of the SYRIZA Youth Wing, and 63 members of the Central Committee left the party. At least 11 members of parliament also left. On 15 July, Polakis, the MP for Chania who had been expelled from the parliamentary party by Famellos, returned and announced that he would run for the party leadership.

== Ideology ==
The main constituent element of the original coalition was Synaspismos, a democratic socialist party, but Syriza was founded with a goal of uniting left-wing and radical left groups. Syriza is influenced by the democratic road to socialism associated with Nicos Poulantzas, but is broadly inclusive of various schools of democratic socialist thought intersecting with Marxism, market socialism, and Trotskyism; as well as social democrats, Maoists and Marxist-Leninists. Additionally, despite its secular ideology, many members are Christians who are anti-clerical and opposed to the privileges of the state-sponsored Church of Greece. From 2013, the coalition became a unitary party, although it retained its name with the addition of United Social Front.

Syriza had been characterized as an anti-establishment party, whose success had sent "shock-waves across the EU". Although it has abandoned its old identity, that of a hard-left protest voice, becoming more left-wing populist in character, and stating that it would not abandon the eurozone, its chairman Alexis Tsipras has declared that the "euro is not my fetish". The Vice President of the European Parliament and Syriza MEP Dimitrios Papadimoulis stated that Greece should "be a respectable member of the European Union and the euro zone", and that "there is absolutely no case for a Grexit". Tsipras clarified that Syriza "does not support any sort of Euroscepticism", though the party was seen by some observers as a soft Eurosceptic force for advocating another Europe free of austerity and neoliberalism. Since governing, the party took a more pro-Europeanist stance, saying that its regulatory reforms, while remaining in the Eurozone, enabled the government, in the words of Filippa Chatzistavrou, "to better address negative externalities and spillovers between Greece and other EU Member States." By 2019, Syriza was said to have become a mainstream centre-left party, taking advantage of the traditional centre-left PASOK's collapse. Tsipras stated that his goal was to build a broad progressive front without abandoning the party's core ideology and left-wing coalition.

During the party's time in government, SYRIZA practised a soft neoliberal policy of austerity, despite its vocal anti-neoliberalism, which contradicted its pre-electoral pledges, ideological outlook, political practice, and its own history, being stuck in populist rhetoric and what are termed "symbolic politics", unable to preserve its radicalism. Observers' analysis has revealed similarities with the previous PASOK governments, in particular the party's outlook from 1974 to 1981.

Syriza is a member of the Party of the European Left, a pan-European party that is opposed to capitalism.

=== Group of 53/Umbrella ===
The Group of 53, also known as 53+, are a faction within Syriza. The group was founded in mid-2014 and stands ideologically between the Left Platform and Tsipras's core backers. Both Euclid Tsakalotos and Gabriel Sakellaridis are members of the group. Another member of the group was Tassos Koronakis, the former secretary of the Syriza Central Committee who resigned following the announcement of the snap elections in September 2015. Since 2015, the group has been the main internal opposition to Tsipras' leadership, and has also used an alternative name, the "Umbrella". On 11 November 2023, after a very tense meeting of the Central Committee, 45 members of the Central Committee belonging to Umbrella announced their withdrawal from the party. Among them are former ministers such as Euclid Tsakalotos, Nikos Filis, Dimitris Vitsas, Panos Skourletis, Thodoris Dritsas, Andreas Xanthos, and the former Speaker of the Hellenic Parliament Nikos Voutsis. The majority (9 MPs 1 MEP) of which later formed the New Left party.

=== Left Platform ===
The Left Platform were a faction within Syriza, positioned ideologically on the far-left of the party. In August 2015, 25 Left Platform MPs within Syriza left the party and formed Popular Unity to contest the snap elections. The grouping was led by former energy minister Panagiotis Lafazanis.

=== Former constituents ===
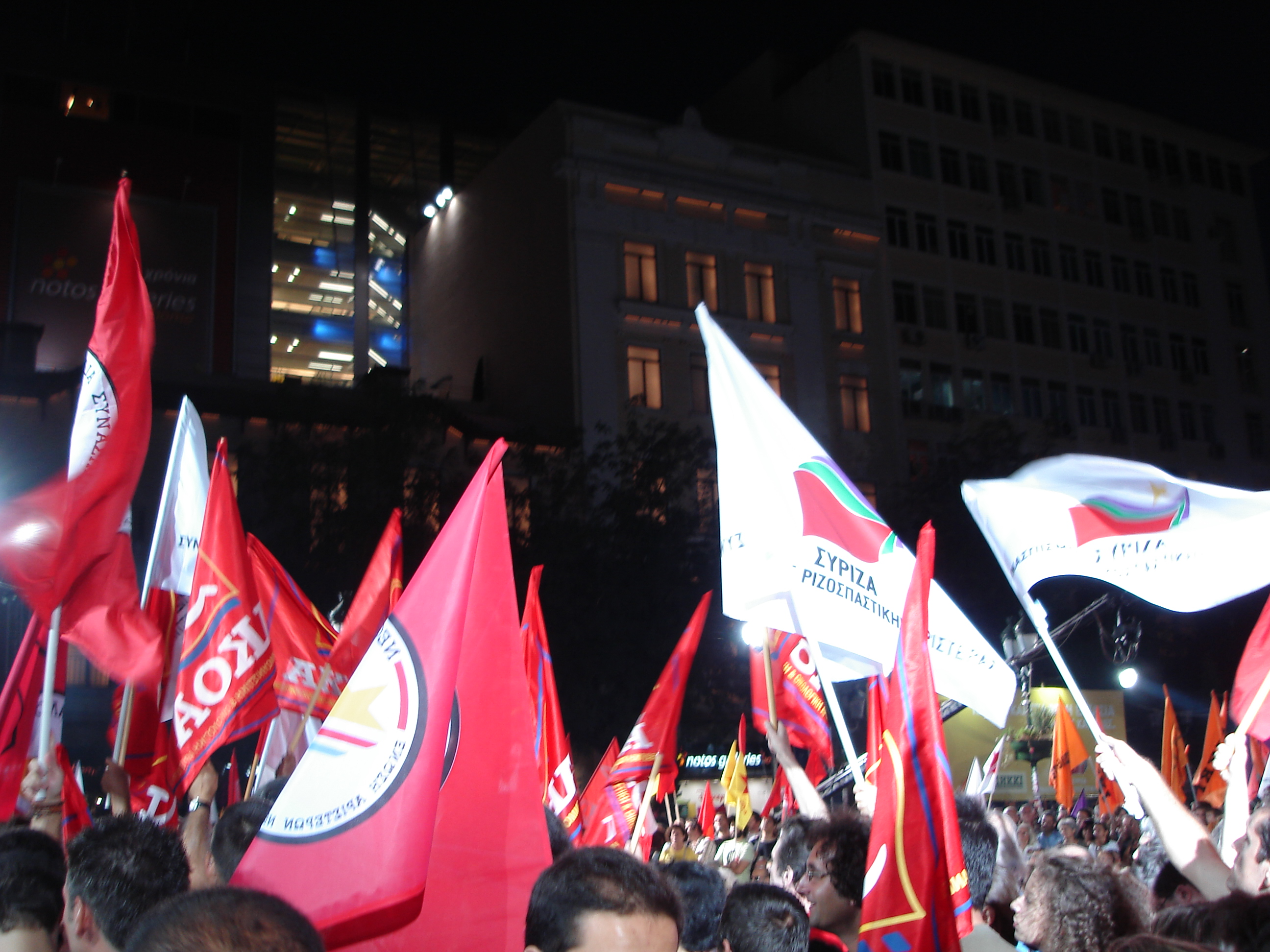
Coalition supporters in a 2007 rally in which flags of Synaspismos, AKOA, DIKKI, and Kokkino can be seen as well as those of the coalition itself

Syriza as a unitary party was formed through the merger of the following parties. The order of presentation is chronological based on the year of joining SYRIZA.

Name	Brief presentation	
Synaspismos	The coalition formed the backbone of SYRIZA and played an important role in bringing together the various left tendencies of the time. Under the presidency of Alekos Alavanos, an electoral alliance was formed with the other founding constituents, which ran as SYRIZA in the 2004 national elections. This alliance lasted until July 2013, when it dissolved itself to exist as a single party.	Founding constituent
Renewing Communist Ecological Left	It was founded in 1987 after the split of the KKE interior. It moved in the area of the Eurocommunist Left. Dissolved itself in July 2013 to form the single party.	Founding constituent
Movement for the Unity of Action of the Left	The movement was founded in 2001 by defectors from the KKE. In 2004 it joined with the other parties to form SYRIZA. Supported Greece's exit from the eurozone and the European Union. In 2013, it was the second component that refused to disband, disagreeing with the transformation of SYRIZA into a single party.	Founding constituent
Internationalist Workers' Left (Greece)	"IWL" Was founded in 2001 as a vehicle for revolutionary Marxism. It was one of the driving forces behind important SYRIZA initiatives such as the Sunday School for Immigrants and the Deport Racism Organization. Opposed the transformation of SYRIZA into a single party. In the August 2015 split, it joined the Popular Unity	Founding constituent
Active Citizens	"Active Citizens" was founded in 2002 by the historical leftist leader Manolis Glezos to participate in the local elections of that year. In 2004 it joined SYRIZA as one of its founding constituents. In 2013 it did not disband, disagreeing with the voluntary self-dissolution. After the death of Glezos in 2020, it ceased to exist in a coherent way.	Founding constituent
Communist Organization of Greece	"COG", a Marxist-Leninist organisation that supported SYRIZA in 2004 but joined it in 2007. It dissolved itself and was absorbed into the single party in 2013.	Founding constituent
Red	The "Red" was an organisation that emerged from the IWL in 2004 and, since 2008, together with the "Ecosocialists" and "Start", has formed the so-called "second wave" within SYRIZA. In July 2013 merged into the single party	
Democratic Social Movement	The party founded by Dimitris Tsovolas in 1995 but joined SYRIZA in 2007 after its transformation into "DIKI - Socialist Left" and the withdrawal of its founder. The party was one of the three that refused to dissolve.	Originated from PASOK
Start – Socialist Internationalist Organisation	"Start", is a Trotskyist organisation, who was founded in 1975 by members of former resistance groups against Greek junta. Initially affiliated to PASOK, part of it broke away in 1992 to form the "Internationalist Socialist Organisation", which joined SYRIZA in 2008. In 2011 announced that it was leaving the party as a constituent but would continue to work with it as part of the mass movement of the Left."	Originated from PASOK
Roza	The radical left organisation "Roza" is a group of libertarian leftists that functioned as an ad hoc component of SYRIZA, with the aim of ensuring its members' participation in SYRIZA's events rather than its independent public presence. Its members are adherents of the Rosa Luxemburg theory and practice, in whose honor they were named. They have positioned themselves to the left of SYRIZA and maintain political links with members of the extra-parliamentary left and the far-left groups of Exarcheia. The group merged into Syriza in July 2013.	Extra-parliamentary left
Ecosocialists of Greece	The "Ecosocialists" was founded as a party in August 2007 and became an official member of SYRIZA in 2008. It was absorbed by the single party in 2012.	Extra-parliamentary left
Anticapitalist Political Group	"APO", of trotskyist ideology with its members active in the trade union field, began its political action in 2009 as a constituent of SYRIZA. Left the party during the split of August 2015, and continued in the ranks of Popular Unity, which it left in 2019.	Extra-parliamentary left
Unitary Front	In 2012, the centre-left Unitarian Front, founded by Panagiotis Kouroumplis after his expulsion from PASOK, joined the party. In 2013 merged into SYRIZA	Originated from PASOK
Union of the Democratic Centre (Greece)	In 2012 in view of the national elections that year, the historic Democratic Centre Union, a moderate Metapolitefsi's party, joined SYRIZA	Originated from Centre Union
Citizens' Association of Rigas	He teamed with SYRIZA in the 2012 national elections and was then absorbed by the single party.	Originated from PASOK
New Fighter	The "New Fighter" was a centre-left (social democratic) collective that broke away from PASOK in 2011 and joined SYRIZA the following year.	Originated from PASOK

== Controversies ==
Thodoris Dritsas, a member of SYRIZA and ex-minister, drew criticism when he declared that "no one has been terrorized, I believe, by the action of these terrorist organizations. No one has been terrorized by the 17 November Group. On the contrary, the Greek people have been terrified by too many other policies". SYRIZA and Dritsas retracted that statement later on. On the issue of SYRIZA's stance towards the terrorist organization 17N, the party has also been criticised as people who are or were affiliated with the party have testified as defense witnesses during the organization's trial. In 2021, the party drew criticism again as fifteen of its members published a declaration supporting 17N's leading member Dimitris Koufontinas, after he went on a hunger strike as a result of his demanding to be moved to another prison facility.

== Election results ==
=== Hellenic Parliament ===
Election	Hellenic Parliament					Rank	Government	Leader
Election	Votes	%	±pp	Seats won	+/−	Rank	Government	Leader
2004 (Note: 2004 results are compared to the Synaspismos totals in the 2000 election.)	241,539	3.3%	+0.1	6 / 300	▲6	4th	Opposition	Nikos Konstantopoulos
2007	361,211	5.0%	+1.7	14 / 300	▲8	4th	Opposition	Alekos Alavanos
2009	315,627	4.6%	–0.4	13 / 300	▼1	5th	Opposition	Alexis Tsipras
May 2012	1,061,265	16.8%	+12.2	52 / 300	▲39	2nd	Opposition	Alexis Tsipras
Jun 2012	1,655,022	26.9%	+10.1	71 / 300	▲19	2nd	Opposition	Alexis Tsipras
Jan 2015 (Note: January 2015 results are compared to the combined totals for Syriza and OP totals in the June 2012 election.)	2,245,978	36.3%	+8.5	149 / 300	▲78	1st	Coalition (2015)	Alexis Tsipras
Jan 2015	2,245,978	36.3%	+8.5	149 / 300	▲78	1st	Caretaker government	Alexis Tsipras
Sep 2015	1,925,904	35.5%	–0.8	145 / 300	▼4	1st	Coalition (2015–2019)	Alexis Tsipras
2019	1,781,174	31.5%	–4.0	86 / 300	▼59	2nd	Opposition	Alexis Tsipras
May 2023	1,184,500	20.1%	–11.4	71 / 300	▼15	2nd	Snap election	Alexis Tsipras
June 2023	929,373	17.8%	–2.3	47 / 300	▼23	2nd	Opposition	Alexis Tsipras

=== European Parliament ===
European Parliament
Election	Votes	%	±pp	Seats won	+/−	Rank	Leader	EP Group
2009 (Note: 2009 results are compared to the Synaspismos totals in the 2004 election.)	240,898	4.70%	+0.54	1 / 22	▲1	5th	Alexis Tsipras	GUE/NGL
2014	1,518,608	26.56%	+21.86	6 / 21	▲5	1st	Alexis Tsipras	GUE/NGL
2019	1,204,083	23.75%	–2.81	6 / 21	0	2nd	Alexis Tsipras	The Left
2024	593,133	14.92%	-8.83	4 / 21	▼2	2nd	Stefanos Kasselakis	The Left

==== Representatives ====
As of June 2024, SYRIZA holds two seats in the European Parliament. These seats are held by:

- Elena Kountoura
- Kostas Arvanitis

== Organization ==
=== Symbols ===
From its founding in 2004 till September 2020, Syriza was represented by three colored flags, each representing the three main pillars of its political positions, Red (Socialism), Green (Ecology) and Purple (Feminism). After the restructuring of the party in 2020, along with the logo change, the symbol was also changed to a star, made out of the Greek letters Σ and Υ.

==== Logos ====
Party logo, 2004–2012

Party logo, 2012–2020

Current logo, since 2020

=== Party leaders ===
No.	Leader	Portrait	Term of office		Prime Minister
1	Nikos Konstantopoulos		15 January 2004	12 December 2004	-
2	Alekos Alavanos		12 December 2004	7 September 2009	-
3	Alexis Tsipras		7 September 2009	29 June 2023	2015–2019
4	Stefanos Kasselakis		24 September 2023	8 September 2024	-
5	Sokratis Famellos		24 November 2024	9 July 2026	-

== See also ==
- 2015 Greek bailout referendum
- Prespa Agreement

== Bibliography ==
- Mudde, Cas (2017). SYRIZA: The Failure of the Populist Promise. Palgrave Macmillan. ISBN 978-3-319-47478-6.
- Katsourides, Yannos (2016). Radical Left Parties in Government: The Cases of SYRIZA and AKEL. Palgrave Macmillan. ISBN 978-1-137-58840-1.
- Katsourides, Yiannos (2020). "Radical Left". In Featherstone, Kevin; Sotiropolous, Dimitri A. (eds.). The Oxford Handbook of Modern Greek Politics (hardcover ed.). Oxford: Oxford University Press. pp. 299–315. doi:10.1093/oxfordhb/9780198825104.013.19. ISBN 978-0-198-82510-4.
