= 2019 Greek local elections =

← 2014	26 May & 2 June 2019	2023 →

Local elections were held in Greece on 26 May 2019 (first round) and 2 June 2019 (second round). Voters elected representatives to the country's local authorities, comprising 13 regions and 325 municipalities. New Democracy dominated the elections, winning 12 out of 13 Regions and 2 out of 3 biggest municipalities per population in the country. SYRIZA lost all the Regions that it had won in 2014.

== Regions ==
=== Nationwide ===
Party	1st Round		2nd Round		Total seats	Total Regions
Party	Votes	%	Votes	%	Total seats	Total Regions
New Democracy	2,527,842	46.68	1,521,522	66.36	339	12
KINAL	1,017,128	18.78	129,467	6.56	135	1
SYRIZA	515,845	9.53	411,830	17.96	50	0
KKE	371,576	6.86	0	0.00	48	0
Golden Dawn	197,567	3.65	0	0.00	22	0
ANTARSYA	87,676	1.62	0	0.00	13	0
LAE	85,212	1.57	0	0.00	11	0
Ecologists Greens	44,078	0.81	0	0.00	4	0
DIXAN	42,579	0.79	0	0.00	3	0
Green Movement (PRAKI)	36,030	0.67	0	0.00	3	0
ANEL	24,149	0.45	0	0.00	3	0
Independent	465,993	8.60	229,980	10.03	73	0

=== Attica ===
Candidate	Party	1st Round		2nd Round		Total seats
Candidate	Party	Votes	%	Votes	%	Total seats
Giorgios Patoulis	New Democracy	600,041	37.63	728,118	65.79	38
Rena Dourou	SYRIZA	314,320	19.71	378,571	34.21	20
Giannis Sgouros	KINAL	277,470	17.40			17
Giannis Protoulis	KKE	132,003	8.28			8
Ilias Panagiotaros	Golden Dawn	89,147	5.59			6
Giorgos Dimitriou	Independent	44,689	2.80			3
Thanos Tzimeros	DIXAN	42,579	2.67			3
Nikos Papadakis	Green Movement (PRAKI)	28,592	1.79			2
Kostas Toulgaridis	ANTARSYA	28,215	1.77			2
Mariana Tsixli	LAE	21,835	1.37			1
Andreas Kourtis	Independent	15,543	0.97			1

=== Central Greece ===
Candidate	Party	1st Round		2nd Round		Total seats
Candidate	Party	Votes	%	Votes	%	Total seats
Fanis Spanos	New Democracy	126,765	39.72	122,128	52.42	20
Apostolos Gletsos	Independent	76,086	23.84	110,847	47.58	12
Dimitris Anagnostakis	Independent	45,145	14.15			7
Katerina Batzeli	KINAL	36,205	11.34			6
Kostas Basdekis	KKE	17,851	5.59			3
Haralambos Giotis	Golden Dawn	8,030	2.52			1
Antonis Voulgaris	LAE	4,626	1.45			1
Niki Polizoi	ANTARSYA	4,440	1.39			1

=== Central Macedonia ===
Candidate	Party	Votes	%	Seats
Apostolos Tzitzikostas	New Democracy	571,893	62.03	44
Christos Giannoulis	SYRIZA	105,710	11.47	8
Christos Papastergiou	KINAL	66,587	7.22	5
Sotiris Avramopoulos	KKE	52,321	5.68	4
Nikolaos Xrisomallis	Golden Dawn	35,307	3.83	3
Filippos Ganoulis	Ecologists Greens	29,235	3.17	2
Gavriil Avramidis	ANEL	19,664	2.13	2
Despina Haralambidou	LAE	18,247	1.98	1
Thanasis Agapitos	ANTARSYA	17,031	1.85	1
Dimitris Vanis	Independent	5,961	0.65	1

=== Crete ===
See: Local Elections in Crete 2019

Candidate	Party	Votes	%	Seats
Stavros Arnaoutakis	KINAL	202,859	60.78	31
Alexandros Markogiannakis	New Democracy	88,509	26.52	14
Manolis Sintichakis	KKE	21,200	6.35	3
Michail Kritsotakis	LAE	7,421	2.22	1
Giorgos Spyropoulos	Golden Dawn	6,912	2.07	1
Giorgos Piagkalakis	ANTARSYA	6,865	2.06	1

=== Eastern Macedonia and Thrace ===
Candidate	Party	1st Round		2nd Round		Total seats
Candidate	Party	Votes	%	Votes	%	Total seats
Christos Metios	New Democracy	109,275	34.36	122,154	50.82	17
Christopoulos Topsidis	New Democracy	97,347	30.61	118,200	49.16	16
Kostas Katsimigas	SYRIZA	40,490	12.73			6
Kostas Simitzis	KINAL	33,804	10.62			5
Dimitris Papatolidis	KKE	16,425	5.16			3
Eleftherios Nikolaidis	Golden Dawn	11,529	3.62			2
Thodoris Perentidis	ANTARSYA	4,704	1.48			1
Andreas Karagiorgis	ANEL	4,485	1.41			1

=== Epirus ===
Candidate	Party	Votes	%	Seats
Alexandros Kachrimanis	New Democracy	119,033	57.10	29
Giorgos Zapsas	SYRIZA	30,937	14.84	7
Spyros Rizopoulos	New Democracy	20,337	9.76	5
Dimitris Dimitriou	KINAL	16,500	7.92	4
Giorgos Prentzas	KKE	12,570	6.03	3
Nikos Zikos	ANTARSYA	3,762	1.80	1
Kostas Noutsopoulos	LAE	2,797	1.34	1
Konstantinos Anagnostou	Golden Dawn	2,512	1.21	1

=== Ionian Islands ===
Candidate	Party	1st Round		2nd Round		Total seats
Candidate	Party	Votes	%	Votes	%	Total seats
Rodi Kratsa-Tsagaropoulou	New Democracy	32,474	29.49	50,142	60.12	12
Theodoros Galiatsatos	SYRIZA	24,388	22.15	33,259	39.88	9
Spyros Spyrou	New Democracy	20,285	18.42			7
Alexandra Mpalou	KKE	13,128	11.92			5
Alexandros Alexakis	KINAL	9,675	8.79			4
Yannis Aivatidis	Golden Dawn	4,503	4.09			2
Stefanos Samoilis	LAE	3,528	3.20			1
Vera Koronaki	ANTARSYA	2,121	1.93			1

=== North Aegean ===
Candidate	Party	1st Round		2nd Round		Total seats
Candidate	Party	Votes	%	Votes	%	Total seats
Kostas Moutzouris	New Democracy	24,503	24.36	41,426	55.40	10
Christiana Kalogirou	New Democracy	30,773	30.60	33,347	44.60	13
Panagiotis Christofas	KINAL	19,745	19.63			8
Stavros Tassos	KKE	10,596	10.54			4
Giannis Spilanis	Independent	10,430	10.37			4
Stratos Georgoulas	Independent	2,902	2.89			1
Nikos Manavis	ANTARSYA	1,628	1.62			1

=== Peloponnese ===
Candidate	Party	1st Round		2nd Round		Total seats
Candidate	Party	Votes	%	Votes	%	Total seats
Panagiotis Nikas	New Democracy	118,080	33.60	137.576	53.59	17
Petros Tatoulis	Independent	119,833	34.09	119.133	46.41	17
Giorgos Dedes	Independent	51,436	14.63			8
Giannis Mpountroukas	KINAL	16,303	4.64			2
Nikos Gontikas	KKE	16,298	4.44			2
Thanasis Petrakos	LAE	9,874	2.81			2
Dimitris Tzempetzis	Golden Dawn	9,548	2.72			1
Dimitra Lymperopoulou	Ecologist Greens	5,238	1.49			1
Panagiotis Katsaris	ANTARSYA	4,864	1.38			1

=== South Aegean ===
Candidate	Party	Votes	%	Seats
Giorgos Hatzimarkos	New Democracy	90,896	53.61	27
Manolis Glynos	KINAL	57,148	33.70	17
Giannis Ntouniadakis	KKE	9,850	5.81	3
Charalampos Kokkinos	New Democracy	6,345	3.74	2
Nikolaos Attitis	Golden Dawn	5,326	3.14	2

=== Thessaly ===
Candidate	Party	Votes	%	Seats
Konstantinos Agorastos	New Democracy	233,454	55.75	28
Nikos Tsilimigas	KINAL	105,320	25.15	13
Tasos Tsiaples	KKE	29,335	7.01	4
Dimitris Kouretas	Independent	22,681	5.42	3
Maria Mpilli-Tsitse	Golden Dawn	10,548	2.52	1
Thanasis Akrivos	Green Movement (PRAKI)	7,438	1.78	1
Stathis Ntouros	ANTARSYA	5,948	1.42	1
Kostas Delimitros	LAE	4,048	0.97	1

=== Western Greece ===
Candidate	Party	1st Round		2nd Round		Total seats
Candidate	Party	Votes	%	Votes	%	Total seats
Nektarios Farmakis	New Democracy	143,721	36.96	168,431	56.33	19
Apostolos Katsifaras	KINAL	128,032	32.93	129,467	43.67	17
Kostas Spiliopoulos	KINAL	47,480	12.21			6
Nikos Karathanasopoulos	KKE	31,314	8.05			4
Vassilis Hatzilambrou	LAE	12,836	3,30			2
Andreas Nikolakopoulos	Golden Dawn	10,442	2.69			1
Kostas Papakonstantinou	Ecologist Greens	9,605	2.47			1
Christos Kosinas	ANTARSYA	5,399	1.39			1

=== Western Macedonia ===
Candidate	Party	Votes	%	Seats
Giorgos Kassapidis	New Democracy	94,111	52.13	21
Theodoros Karypidis	Independent	43,750	24.24	10
Georgia Zembiliadou	Independent	27,537	15.25	6
Thanasis Chastas	KKE	8,685	4.81	2
Christos Savvoulidis	Golden Dawn	3,763	2.08	1
Stefanos Prasos	ANTARSYA	2,699	1.49	1

== Major Municipalities ==
=== Athens ===
Candidate	Party	1st Round		2nd Round		Total seats
Candidate	Party	Votes	%	Votes	%	Total seats
Kostas Bakoyannis	New Democracy	88,916	42.65	96.660	65.25	21
Nasos Iliopoulos	SYRIZA	35,392	16.98	51.487	34.75	8
Pavlos Geroulanos	KINAL	27,491	13.19			6
Ilias Kasidiaris	Golden Dawn	21,959	10.53			5
Nikos Sofianos	KKE	15,575	7.47			4
Giorgos Karambelias	Ardin Movement	4,606	2.21			1
Giorgos Voulgarakis	New Momentum (NEO)	4,252	2.04			1
Vassilis Kapernaros	Radical National Alert (RIZES)	3,279	1.57			1
Petros Konstantinou	ANTARSYA	3,210	1.54			1
Ntina Reppa	ANTARSYA	2,071	0.99			1
Aygi Theodosi	LAE	1,715	0.82			

=== Thessaloniki ===
Candidate	Party	1st Round		2nd Round		Total seats
Candidate	Party	Votes	%	Votes	%	Total seats
Konstantinos Zervas	New Democracy	18,419	14.93	59.578	66.79	7
Nikos Tachiaos	New Democracy	27,629	22.40	29.629	33.21	11
Giorgos Orfanos	New Momentum (NEO)	17,906	14.52			7
Katerina Notopoulou	SYRIZA	16,666	13.51			7
Spyros Vougias	KINAL	8,691	7.05			3
Panagiotis Psomiadis	Independent	6,779	5.50			3
Sotiris Zarianopoulos	KKE	5,505	4.46			2
Petros Lekakis	KINAL	3,192	2.59			1
Efraim (Makis) Kyrizidis	New Democracy	3,188	2.58			1
Xaris Aidonopoulos	New Democracy	3,022	2.45			1
Michalis Tremopoulos	Ecologists Greens	2,166	1.76			1
Antonis Gazakis	ANTARSYA	2,148	1.74			1
Giorgos Rakkas	Ardin Movement	1,537	1.25			1
Giannis Kouriannidis	Patriotic Radical Union (PATRIE)	1,327	1.08			1
Ioannis Nasioulas	Independent	1,270	1.03			1
Vasilis Moysidis	New Democracy	1,240	1.01			1
Grigoris Zarotiadis	KINAL	1,188	0.96			
Giannis Koutras	ANTARSYA	1,180	0.96			
Konstantinos Anagnostaras	Independent	294	0.24			

=== Patras ===
Candidate	Party	1st Round		2nd Round		Total seats
Candidate	Party	Votes	%	Votes	%	Total seats
Kostas Peletidis	KKE	40,489	40.60	54.672	70.91	20
Grigoris Alexopoulos	KINAL	15,970	16.01	22.431	29.09	8
Nikos Papadimatos	New Democracy	13,936	13.97			7
Nikos Nikolopoulos	Christiandemocratic Party of Greece (XRIKE)	7,498	7.52			4
Giorgos Roros	SYRIZA	6,662	6.68			3
Petros Psomas	Independent	6,371	6.39			3
Nikos Tzanakos	KINAL	2,632	2.64			1
Theodoros Drinias	Ardin Movement	2,023	2.03			1
Alekos Chrysanthakopoulos	Independent	1,840	1.84			1
Christos Patouxas	LAE	1,429	1.43			
Dimitris Belias	ANTARSYA	464	0.47			
Theodoros Belezonis	ANTARSYA	416	0.42			
