= 2014 Greek local elections =

2014 local elections

- 18 & 25 May 2014
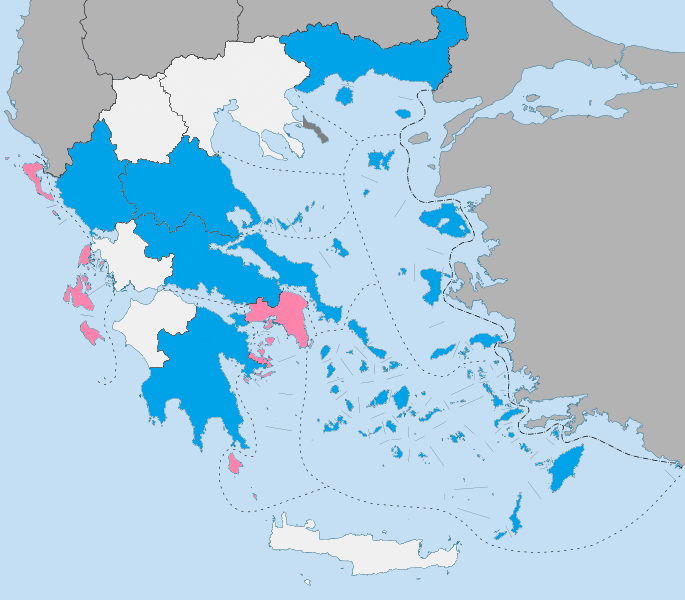
- Regions won by ■ – Nea Dimokratia ■ – SYRIZA ■ – independents

Local elections were held in Greece on 18 May 2014 (first round) and 25 May 2014 (second round). Voters elected representatives to the country's local authorities, comprising 13 regions and 325 municipalities.

== Background ==
Traditionally, candidates at local elections do not run under the official name of any party as the constitution only foresees the participation of electoral lists (or "combinations") and not parties. Despite this theoretical independence and distinction, for all practical purposes most candidates run as local front organisations for political parties.

== Issues ==
Greece is still facing a long-term government-debt crisis, which may affect the elections.

== Election results ==
Source: Hellenic Ministry of the Interior

In the municipalities, as well as the regions, any candidate can participate in the first round. If the leading candidate does not have an absolute majority (50%+) of the votes, then a second round is held between the two leading candidates in the first round.

=== Regions ===
==== Attica ====
Contender Rena Dourou (SYRIZA) defeated incumbent Ioannis Sgouros (Society of Values) in the second round and succeeded him as Regional Governor of Attica.

Candidate	Supporting Parties	1st Round			2nd Round			Total seats
Candidate	Supporting Parties	Votes	%	Seats	Votes	%	Seats	Total seats
Rena Dourou	SYRIZA	386,833	23.80	12	794,231	50.82	49	61
Ioannis Sgouros	Society of Values (Note: This candidate ran as an independent, but is closely identified with PASOK.)	359,302	22.11	11	768,604	49.18	1	12
Georgios Koumoutsakos	Nea Dimokratia	228,913	14.08	7				7
Ilias Panagiotaros	Golden Dawn	180,908	11.13	6				6
Thanasis Pafilis	KKE	173,325	10.66	5				5
Pavlos Chaikalis	ANEL	116,464	7.17	4				4
Thanos Tzimeros	Recreate Greece – Drasi	48,242	2.97	2				2
Antonios Gakis	Ecologist Greens	36,449	2.24	1				1
Despina Koutsoumba	ANTARSYA	33,895	2.09	1				1
Petros Mantoumbalos	EPAL	32,475	2.00	1				1
Maria Giannakaki	DIMAR – Greens – Europe-Ecology	28,601	1.76	1				1

==== Central Greece ====
Kostas Bakoyannis (ND) defeated Evangelos Apostolou (SYRIZA) in the second round and succeeded Klearchos Pergantas (PASOK) as Regional Governor of Central Greece.

Candidate	Supporting Parties	1st Round			2nd Round			Total seats
Candidate	Supporting Parties	Votes	%	Seats	Votes	%	Seats	Total seats
Kostas Bakoyannis	Nea Dimokratia	136,688	41.35	11	161,286	56.06	20	31
Evangelos Apostolou	SYRIZA	61,961	18.75	5	126,428	43.94	5	10
Athanasios Giannopoulos	EPAL	47,609	14.40	4				4
Apostolos Gletsos	Golden Dawn	29,867	9.04	2				2
Georgios Marinos	KKE	29,191	8.83	2				2
Konstantinos Chainas	DIMAR	14,115	4.27	1				1
Vassilis Zoumbos	ANTARSYA	11,093	3.36	1				1

==== Central Macedonia ====
Incumbent Apostolos Tzitzikostas (ANEL/EPAL/LAOS) defeated contender Giannis Ioannidis (ND) in the second round and remained Regional Governor of Central Macedonia.

Candidate	Supporting Parties	1st Round			2nd Round			Total seats
Candidate	Supporting Parties	Votes	%	Seats	Votes	%	Seats	Total seats
Apostolos Tzitzikostas	ANEL – EPAL – LAOS	322,829	32.81		562.964	71.01		43
Giannis Ioannidis	Nea Dimokratia	182,912	18.59		229,838	28.99		11
Despina Charalampidou	SYRIZA	115,484	11.74	4				4
Nikos Chrysomallis	Golden Dawn	85,960	8.74	3				3
Markos Bolaris	DIMAR	84,089	8.55	3				3
Giannis Ziogas	KKE	78,330	7.96	3				3
Niobi Pavlidou	Elia – Drasi – Society of Values	58,059	5.90	2				2
Michalis Tremopoulos	Ecologist Greens – Greens	30,419	3.09	1				1
Thanassis Agapitos	ANTARSYA	25,842	2.63	1				1

==== Crete ====
Incumbent Stavros Arnaoutakis (Drasi) defeated contender Serafim Tsokas (ND) in the second round and remained Regional Governor of Crete.

Candidate	Supporting Parties	1st Round			2nd Round			Total seats
Candidate	Supporting Parties	Votes	%	Seats	Votes	%	Seats	Total seats
Stavros Arnaoutakis	Drasi	143,461	41.13		184,154	64.01		31
Serafim Tsokas	Nea Dimokratia	91,411	26.21		103,547	35.99		11
Michalis Kritsotakis	SYRIZA	65,000	18.64	5				5
Stelios Orfanos	KKE	19,912	5.71	1				1
Giorgos Spyropoulos	Golden Dawn	11,585	3.32	1				1
Antonis Anipsitakis	DIMAR – Ecologist Greens	9,234	2.65	1				1
Giannis Kyriakakis	ANTARSYA	8,198	2.35	1				1

==== Eastern Macedonia and Thrace ====
Giorgos Pavlidis (ND), the former prefect of Xanthi, defeated incumbent Aris Giannakidis (ind.) in the second round and succeeded him as Regional Governor of Eastern Macedonia and Thrace.

Candidate	Supporting Parties	1st Round			2nd Round			Total seats
Candidate	Supporting Parties	Votes	%	Seats	Votes	%	Seats	Total seats
Giorgos Pavlidis	Nea Dimokratia	122,086	34.73		168,852	56.34		31
Aris Giannakidis	–	96,959	27.58		130,845	43.66		10
Konstantinos Morfidis	SYRIZA	40,105	11.41	3				3
Terence Quick	ANEL	28,728	8.17	2				2
Christos Kitsopoulos	Golden Dawn	20,942	5.96	2				2
Christos Trellis	KKE	18,859	5.36	1				1
Vasileos Traiforos	DIMAR	10,158	2.89	1				1
Katerina Gerostergiou	Ecologist Greens – Greens	8,322	2.37	1				1
Giorgos Botsidis	ANTARSYA	5,387	1.53	0				0

==== Epirus ====
Incumbent Alexandros Kachrimanis (ND) defeated contender Olga Gerovasili (SYRIZA) in the first round and remained Regional Governor of Epirus.

Candidate	Supporting Parties	Votes	%	Seats
Alexandros Kachrimanis	Nea Dimokratia	110,746	50.83	31
Olga Gerovasili	SYRIZA	53,543	24.58	10
Giorgos Zapsas	DIMAR	21,037	9.66	4
Olga Tsoumani	KKE	17,549	8.05	3
Konstantinos Anagnostou	Golden Dawn	8,591	3.94	2
Nikos Zikos	ANTARSYA	6,400	2.94	1

==== Ionian Islands ====
Contender Theodoros Galiatsatos (SYRIZA), defeated incumbent Spyros Spyrou (ND) in the second round and succeeded him as Regional Governor of the Ionian Islands.

Candidate	Supporting Parties	1st Round			2nd Round			Total seats
Candidate	Supporting Parties	Votes	%	Seats	Votes	%	Seats	Total seats
Theodoros Galiatsatos	SYRIZA	24,694	20.55		63,506	59.93		24
Spyros Spyrou	Nea Dimokratia	26,147	21.76		42,469	40.07		5
Angela Gerekou	Drasi	17,419	14.49	3				3
Giorgos Kaloudis	Ecologist Greens	14,428	12.01	3				3
Theodoros Goulis	KKE	13,750	11.44	2				2
Alekos Desyllas	–	6,216	5.17	1				1
Nikos Lemontzis	Golden Dawn	6,192	5.15	1				1
Christos Anthis	–	5,483	4.56	1				1
Tassos Salvanos	DIMAR	3,192	2.66	1				1
Evanthia Gaitanidou	ANTARSYA	2,661	2.21	0				0

==== North Aegean ====
Contender Christiana Kalogirou (ND) defeated incumbent Nassos Giakalis (ind.) in the second round and succeeded him as Regional Governor of the North Aegean.

Candidate	Supporting Parties	1st Round			2nd Round			Total seats
Candidate	Supporting Parties	Votes	%	Seats	Votes	%	Seats	Total seats
Christiana Kalogirou	Nea Dimokratia	33,410	31.51		46,357	53.01		25
Nassos Giakalis	–	27,446	25.88		41,095	46.99		6
Aglaia Kyritsi	SYRIZA	20,538	19.37	4				4
Stratis Korakas	KKE	15,565	14.68	3				3
Giannis Spilanis	DIMAR – Drasi	3,673	3.46	1				1
Vassilis Ballas	Ecologist Greens	2,878	2.71	1				1
Andreas Ballas	ANTARSYA	2,525	2.38	1				1

==== Peloponnese ====
Incumbent Petros Tatoulis (ND) defeated contender Odysseas Voudouris (SYRIZA) in the second round and remained Regional Governor of Peloponnese.

Candidate	Supporting Parties	1st Round			2nd Round			Total seats
Candidate	Supporting Parties	Votes	%	Seats	Votes	%	Seats	Total seats
Petros Tatoulis	Nea Dimokratia	157,672	43.17		182.456	59.35		31
Odysseas Voudouris	SYRIZA	57,417	15.72		124.953	40.65		9
Giorgos Dedes	DIMAR – Society of Values	56,181	15.38	4				4
Dimitris Doltsiniadis	Golden Dawn	32,894	9.01	2				2
Nikos Gontikos	KKE	23,696	6.49	2				2
Giannis Manolis	EPAL	18,797	5.15	1				1
Panayotis Katsaris	ANTARSYA	10,653	2.92	1				1
Dimitra Lymberopoulou	Ecologist Greens	7,946	2.18	1				1

==== South Aegean ====
Contender Giorgos Hatzimarkos (ND) defeated incumbent Ioannis Mahairidis (ind.) in the second round and succeeded him as Regional Governor of the South Aegean.

Candidate	Supporting Parties	1st Round			2nd Round			Total seats
Candidate	Supporting Parties	Votes	%	Seats	Votes	%	Seats	Total seats
Giorgos Hatzimarkos	Nea Dimokratia	61,168	35.71		83,317	56.86		31
Ioannis Mahairidis	–	55,269	32.27		63,216	43.14		11
Benetos Spyrou	SYRIZA – Ecologist Greens	31,483	18.38	5				5
Lila Kafantari	KKE	13,561	7.92	2				2
Savvas Spyridis	Golden Dawn	9,813	5.73	2				2

==== Thessaly ====
Incumbent Konstantinos Agorastos (ND) defeated contender Nikos Tsilimingas (DIMAR) in the second round and remained Regional Governor of Thessaly.

Candidate	Supporting Parties	1st Round			2nd Round			Total seats
Candidate	Supporting Parties	Votes	%	Seats	Votes	%	Seats	Total seats
Konstantinos Agorastos	Nea Dimokratia	189,591	42.90		208,170	54.50		31
Nikos Tsilimingas	DIMAR	76,434	17.30		173,814	45.50		9
Iro Dioti	SYRIZA	58,762	13.30	3				3
Vangelis Boutas	KKE	46,075	10.43	3				3
Panagiotis Iliopoulos	Golden Dawn	30,552	6.91	2				2
Marina Chrysoveloni	ANEL	20,456	4.63	1				1
Nikos Poutsiakas	Ecologist Greens – Greens	10,166	2.30	1				1
Stathis Douros	ANTARSYA	9,870	2.23	1				1

==== Western Greece ====
Incumbent Apostolos Katsifaras (ind.) defeated contender Andreas Katsaniotis (Nea Dimokratia) in the second round and remained Regional Governor of Western Greece.

Candidate	Supporting Parties	1st Round			2nd Round			Total seats
Candidate	Supporting Parties	Votes	%	Seats	Votes	%	Seats	Total seats
Apostolos Katsifaras	–	92,462	23.06		153,028	50.50		31
Andreas Katsaniotis	Nea Dimokratia	79,610	19.85		149,984	49.50		5
Vassilis Hatzilambrou	SYRIZA	67,406	16.81	4				4
Thymios Sokos	DIMAR	50,862	12.68	3				3
Nikos Karathanasopoulos	KKE	35,284	8.80	2				2
Christos Rigas	Golden Dawn	31,338	7.82	2				2
Ioannis Zapheiropoulos	–	13,069	3.26	1				1
Panayotis Laliotis	ANEL	11,794	2.94	1				1
Giorgos Kanellis	Ecologist Greens	10,957	2.73	1				1
Dimitris Desyllas	ANTARSYA	8,187	2.04	1				1

==== Western Macedonia ====
Contender Theodoros Karypidis (ind.), defeated incumbent Georgios Dakis (ND) in the second round and succeeded him as Regional Governor of Western Macedonia.

Candidate	Supporting Parties	1st Round			2nd Round			Total seats
Candidate	Supporting Parties	Votes	%	Seats	Votes	%	Seats	Total seats
Theodoros Karypidis	–	24,694	29.13		101,566	59.01		25
Georgios Dakis	Nea Dimokratia	67,859	35.61		70,545	40.99		9
Themis Moumoulidis	SYRIZA	21,054	11.05	2				2
Georgia Zembiliadou	DIMAR	20,573	10.80	2				2
Giannis Vittas	KKE	13,134	6.89	2				2
Nikolaos Kourkoutas	Golden Dawn	8,982	4.71	1				1
Stefanos Prassos	ANTARSYA	3,443	1.81	0				0

=== Major municipalities ===
==== Athens ====
Candidate	Supporting Party	1st Round	%	2nd Round	%	Total seats
Giorgos Kaminis	Olive Tree- Democratic Left– Bridges- Greens- Europe-Ecology	46,976	21.06	110,987	51.42	29
Gabriel Sakellaridis	Coalition of Radical Left	44,620	20.00	104,876	48.58	5
Aris Spiliotopoulos	New Democracy	37,746	16.92			4
Ilias Kasidiaris	Golden Dawn	35,949	16.12			4
Nikos Sofianos	Communist Party of Greece	16,529	7.41			2
Nikitas Kaklamanis	EPAL (Note: This candidate is a former member of New Democracy.)	15,834	7.10			2
Vassilis Kapernaros	Independent Greeks	7,937	3.56			1
Nikos Avramidis	Independent-Panathinaikos Movement	6,489	2.91			1
Petros Konstantinou	ANTARSYA	4,398	1.97			1
Ioanna Kondouli	Ecologist Greens	3,024	1.36			0
Marios Strofalis	Independent	2,097	0.94			0
Stavros Vidalis	Independent	1,474	0.66			0

==== Thessaloniki ====
Candidate	Supporting Party	1st Round	%	2nd Round	%	Total seats
Yiannis Boutaris	Olive Tree - Drassi - Europe-Ecology	47,628	36.04	70,126	58.11	29
Stavros Kalafatis	New Democracy	34,564	26.16	50,542	41.89	10
Triantafyllos Mitafidis	Coalition of Radical Left	13,968	10.57			3
Artemis Mattheopoulos	Golden Dawn	10,195	7.71			2
Ioannis Delis	Communist Party of Greece	8,233	6.23			2
Makis Stergiou		4,168	3.15			1
Eleanna Ioannidou	Ecologist Greens - Greens	4,131	3.13			1
George Rakkas		2,869	2.17			1
Giannis Koutras	ANTARSYA	2,804	2.12			0
Giannis Kouriannidis	National Unity Association - National Front	1,918	1.45			0
Dimitris Papamichael	Pirate Party of Greece	1,672	1.27			0

=== Nationwide percentage results ===
Party	Nationwide results	Change from 2010 local elections	Change from 2012 legislative elections
ND	26.3	▼6.3	▼3.2
Coalition of the Radical Left	17.7	▲12.7	▼9.2
PASOK (Olive Tree) (Note: including Agreement for the New Greece, Dynamic Greece and others)	16.2	▼18.5	▲3.9
KKE	8.8	▼2.1	▲4.3
ΧΑ	8.1	-	▲1.1
DIMAR	3.8	▲1.6	▼2.3
ANEL	3.2	-	▼4.3
ANTARSYA	2.3	▲0.5	▲2.0
OP	2.1	▼0.7	▲1.2
All others	11.1	▲0.8	

== Reaction ==
The elections were regarded as a victory for SYRIZA, which was not expected to perform well due to its weak local organization. Candidates backed by the ruling New Democracy fared poorly, particularly Prime Minister Antonis Samaras' hand-picked candidates. In Athens, New Democracy failed to make the runoff for the first time since 1975.

In response the results, PM Samaras said "Greece must show it has the stability that it deserves" in the second round and European election scheduled to take place next week. Opposition leader Alexis Tsipras said it was a "historic day", and that next Sunday would be "the first day of a new era."
