= 2019 Crete regional elections =

- 26 May 2019

All 51 seats to the Regional Council of Crete
- Turnout: 65.14%
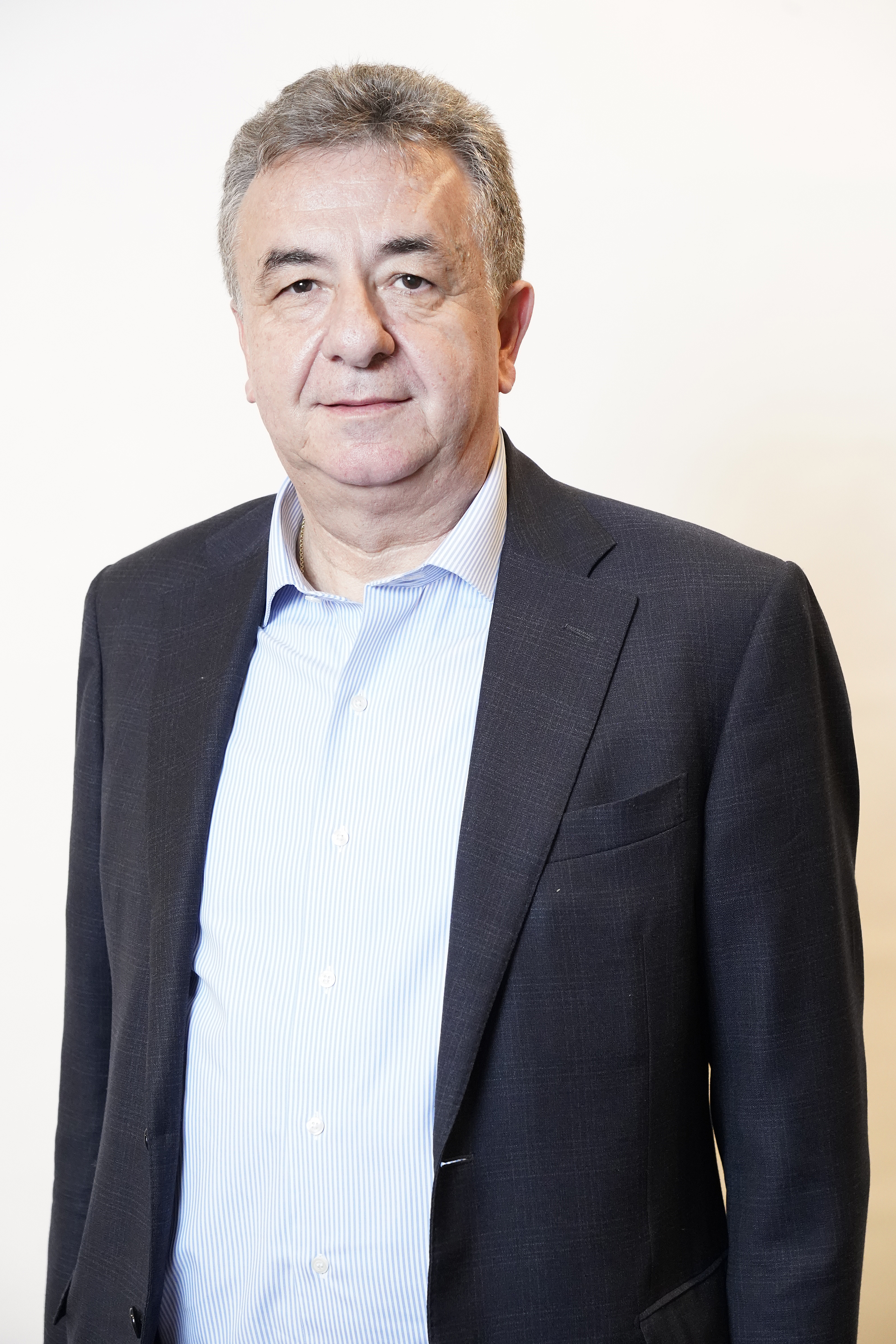
	First party	Second party	Third party
Candidate	Stavros Arnaoutakis	Alexandros Markogiannakis	Emmanouil Syntychakis
Party	Crete our Life	Crete Forward	Popular Convolution of Crete
Alliance	PASOK–SYRIZA	New Democracy	KKE
Seats won	31	14	3
Seat change	Steady	▲2	Steady
Popular vote	202.802	88,448	21,164
Percentage	60.82%	26.52%	6,35%
Swing	▲19.69pp (first round)	▲0.31pp (first round)	▲0.64pp
Regional Governor before election
Stavros Arnaoutakis
PASOK
Elected Regional Governor
Stavros Arnaoutakis
PASOK

The 2019 Cretan regional election took place on 26 May 2019, simultaneously with the rest of Greece. The election was for all 51 elected seats of the Regional Council of Crete as well as the Regional Governor.

This was the third Cretan regional election and the incumbent Governor (Stavros Arnaoutakis, PASOK) ran for a third consecutive term.

The ballot resulted in the election of Stavros Arnaoutakis, the incumbent Governor, as Regional Governor with 61% of the votes. The center-right candidate, Alexandros Markogiannakis, came in second with 27 percent. The KKE candidate, Emmanouil Syntychakis, received 6 percent of the vote. The socialist list supported by LAE, the far-right list supported by Golden Dawn and the anti-capitalist list supported by Antarsya also gained representation in the council.

== Electoral system ==
According to the new electoral system introduced by the SYRIZA government, to become a Mayor or Regional Governor, one of the candidates must receive 50% + 1 of the votes. In areas where no candidate achieved the required percentage in the first round, a second round of elections was held between the two leading candidates one week later, on June 2. For the seat distribution in the council, the system of simple proportional representation was applied.

== Results ==
Party	Votes	%	Seats
Crete our Life	202,802	60.82	31
Crete Forward	88,448	26.52	14
Popular Convolution of Crete	21,164	6.35	3
Xasteria! Turnaround for Crete	7,386	2.21	1
Hellenic Dawn for Crete	6,922	2.08	1
Insubordinate Crete Anticapitalist Leftist Interference	6,751	2.02	1
Total	333,473	100.00	51
Valid votes	333,473	96.72	
Invalid/blank votes	11,308	3.28	
Total votes	344,781	100.00	
Registered voters/turnout	546,099	63.14	
Source: https://ekloges-prev.singularlogic.eu/2019/p/home/en/regions/13/
