= Ecological Movement of Thessaloniki =

Greek ecological activist group

The Ecological Movement of Thessaloniki (Greek: Οικολογική Κίνηση Θεσσαλονίκης, Oikologiki Kinisi Thessalonikis) is a Greek ecological activist group, founded in 1982.

== History ==
The movement was founded in 1982 by a group of environmental activists, including Michalis Tremopoulos (now an elected councillor in the Thessaloniki Prefecture and a member of the Executive Secretariat of Ecologist Greens) and Yiannis Tziolas, who are still active. The group was formed with an emphasis on action and social mobilization, and its political agenda was formed from the main pillars of green ideology: ecology, pacifism/non-violence, grassroots democracy, human rights, and social solidarity. The early ideology of the group was influenced by Murray Bookchin's social ecology, and the ideas of André Gorz, Ivan Illich and Cornelius Castoriadis.

The movement's first major campaign was opposition to the Thessaloniki Ring Road, which was planned to lead through the urban forest that surrounds the city, requiring the felling of thousands of trees. The group held demonstrations on the site of the works in the forest and in the main streets of the city, including one march attended by 2,000 people, but the construction of the new road eventually went ahead.

The group had an open form of organisation, with a weekly free meeting as a core element of their organisation. Decisions were made by all those present. In 1984, a small group of university students in Thessaloniki, most of whom were members of Oikologiki Kinissi, began their first attempts to treat injured and sick wild animals. They rescued animals from the city zoo, where they had been left by members of the public. Soon the group joined the Hellenic Ornithological Society, and wildlife rehabilitation became a regular activity of the society for several years, receiving much publicity. In 1990, the most active members of the group founded the non-profit Hellenic Wildlife Hospital.

Other issues the group focuses on include urban ecology, traffic, the protection of the urban forest, and the city sewage treatment. In June 1998 it participated in the Global Street Party, organised by the British group Reclaim the Streets. Another focal point of action is the nearby biotopes, like the forest of Mount Chortiatis or the two Ramsar wetlands (the deltas of the Axios, Loudias and Haliacmon rivers, and Lakes Koroneia and Volvi).

=== 1990s ===
At the end of the 1980s, the group was involved in the formation of a Greek Federation of Ecological and Environmental Organisations. In 1990 the federation transformed into a political party, the Alternative Ecologists), which was beset with problems and proved to be short-lived. The collapse of the party caused a decline in membership for the larger groups, while the smaller and newer groups ceased to exist. The Thessaloniki group managed to survive but with much reduced membership. In 1995, members of the group founded Antigone, an information and documentation centre on racism, ecology, peace and non-violence. In the mid 1990s a green-left list was organised to participate in local elections. The list had a strongly anti-nationalistic stance during a period in which nationalistic sentiments were stirred by the name and flag of Greece's new neighbour, the Republic of Macedonia, as well as the war in Bosnia-Herzegovina. In local elections in 1998, the list received the support of Synaspismos, the Greek Party of the European Left, and had one member, Tremopoulos, elected to the Prefecture Council.

Motivated by its anti-war and non-violent positions, the group declared its opposition to the war in former Yugoslavia, the ethnic cleansing of the Serbian Government, and NATO interference, and tried to draw the Greek public away from support for Slobodan Milosevic. It also tried to strengthen ties between Balkan green, pacifist and democratic groups, and organised a conference with speakers from the Serbian Independent Syndicates and the Kosovar independent press.

During the 1990s, a sub-group focusing on issues related to conscientious objectors, peace, anti-militarism and non-violence, initiated the magazine Arnoumai English: I Refuse.

=== Since 2000 ===
In 2000, the group's main campaigns focused on opposition to genetically modified foods and the changes to the Greek Constitution proposed by a parliamentary committee. In particular, the proposed amendment to Article 24, concerning forest and nature protection, was considered to be vague and weaker than the previous wording. Protests against these issues involved local ecological groups, national environmental NGOs, and other organisations, and in 2004, Greek opponents of GMOs formed gmostop.org.

The Ecological Movement of Thessaloniki also initiated the Ecological Forum in 2000, an attempt to bring together the green political groups of Greece, active individuals, and Prasini Politiki, then a member of the European Greens. This resulted in another effort of party building, which became the Ecologist Greens, founded in 2002. The party became a member of the European Federation of Green Parties.

In the local elections of 2002, and again in 2006, Tremopoulos was re-elected to the Council of Thessaloniki Prefecture. In the European elections of 2004, he headed the list of candidates of Ecologist Greens for the European Parliament. In the European elections of 2009, he headed the party's list of candidates again; the party received 3.45% and Tremopoulos was elected, as the first Green MEP from Greece.
