= Gabriel Sakellaridis =

Greek economist and politician

- Γαβριήλ Σακελλαρίδης
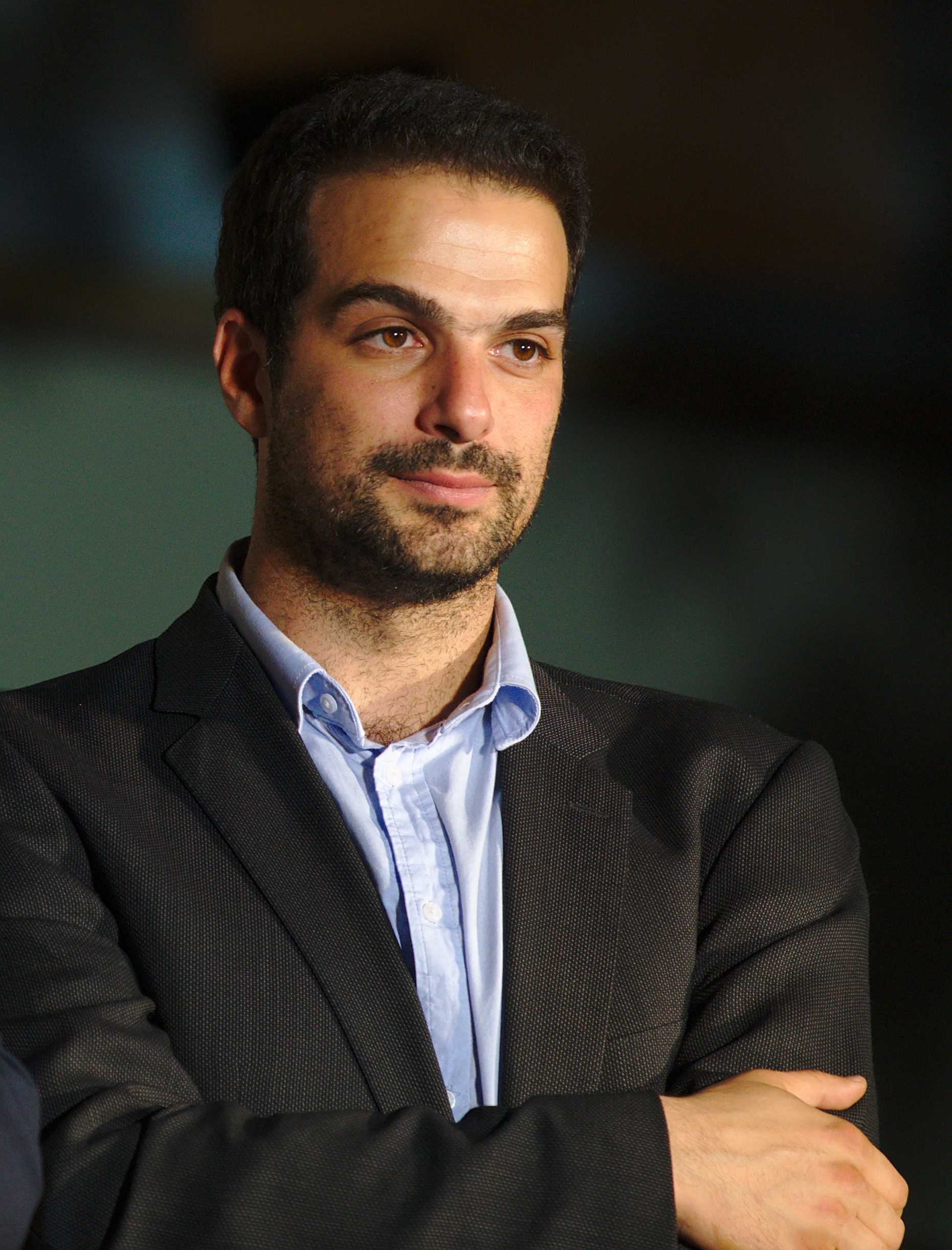
- Sakellaridis in 2014

President of New Left
- Incumbent
- Assumed office 24 March 2026
- Preceded by: Alexis Haritsis

Secretary of New Left
- Incumbent
- Assumed office 24 November 2024
- Preceded by: Office established

Deputy Minister to the Prime Minister and Government Spokesperson
- In office 27 January 2015 – 18 July 2015
- Prime Minister: Alexis Tsipras
- Preceded by: Sofia Voultepsi
- Succeeded by: Olga Gerovasili

Member of the Hellenic Parliament
- In office 25 January 2015 – 19 November 2015
- Constituency: Athens A

Personal details
- Born: 20 August 1980 (age 46) Nea Smyrni, Greece
- Party: New Left (since 2024); Syriza (2013-2024)
- Education: Athens University of Economics and Business; The New School

Gabriel Sakellaridis (Greek: Γαβριήλ Σακελλαρίδης; born 20 August 1980) is a Greek economist and politician. From January 2015 to July 2015 he served as the Deputy Minister to the Prime Minister and Government Spokesperson in the Cabinet of Alexis Tsipras. Since September 2017, he is the Greece country Director of Amnesty International.

== Political career ==
At the 2014 local elections, he ran for the post of the mayor of Athens. In his campaign he advocated for an open city with less police but more quality of life. Finishing second, he reached the second round of the election, but then lost to incumbent Giorgos Kaminis.

On his third attempt, Sakellaridis, placed on second position in the Athens A constituency, won a seat in the January 2015 legislative elections. He had before contested the consecutive May and June elections from unpromising positions in the Athens B constituency.

Following the government takeover by Syriza, he was appointed a Deputy Minister to the Prime Minister and Government Spokesperson. In a government reshuffle on 17 July 2015, he switched his post with Olga Gerovasili who became government speaker, leaving him the post of a parliamentary spokesperson. Reelected in the subsequent September 2015 snap election, Sakellaridis however wasn't reappointed to Tsipras' second cabinet.

On 19 November 2015, Sakellaridis, who was a member of Syriza's moderately leftist "53+" faction, resigned from his parliamentary seat because he could no longer support the bailout and therefore couldn't "contribute to the implementation of government policies." Sakellaridis thereby announced his complete withdrawal from the main political scene.

In September 2017 he was appointed as director of the Greek section of Amnesty International.

In February 2024 he returned to politics joining New Left (Greece) and assuming the position of the party's head of Political Planning.
