= Katsifaras =

Katsifaras (Greek: Κατσιφάρας) is a Greek surname. Notable people with the surname include:

- Apostolos Katsifaras (born 1959), Greek politician and governor of Western Greece,
- Georgios Katsifaras (1935–2012), Greek politician and government minister,
