= 2010 Greek local elections =

← 2006	7 & 14 November 2010	2014 →
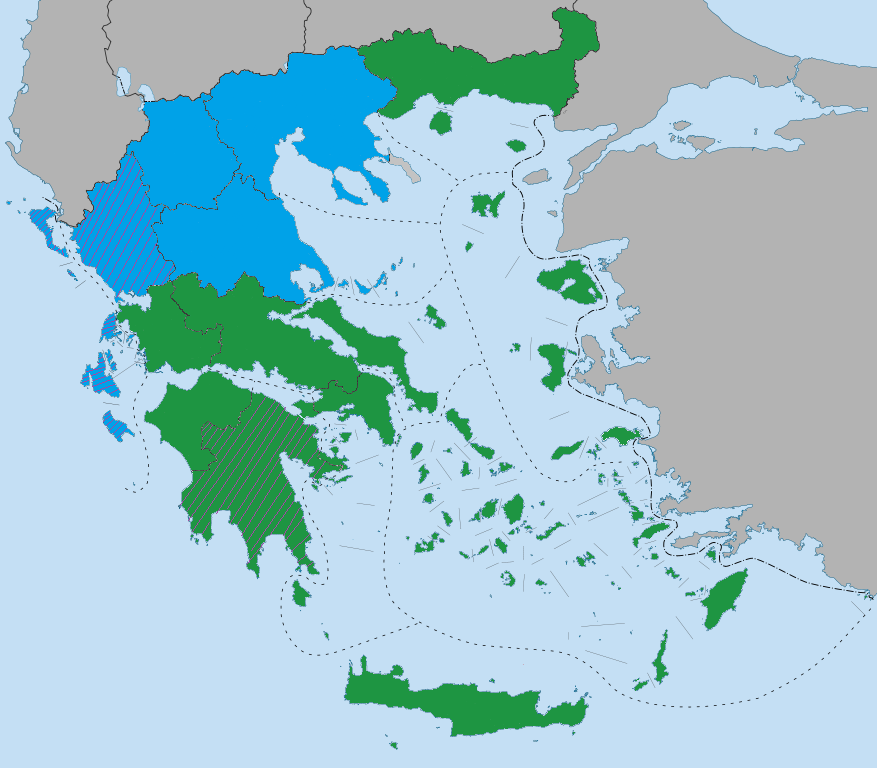
- Regions won by ■ – PASOK ■ – Nea Dimokratia

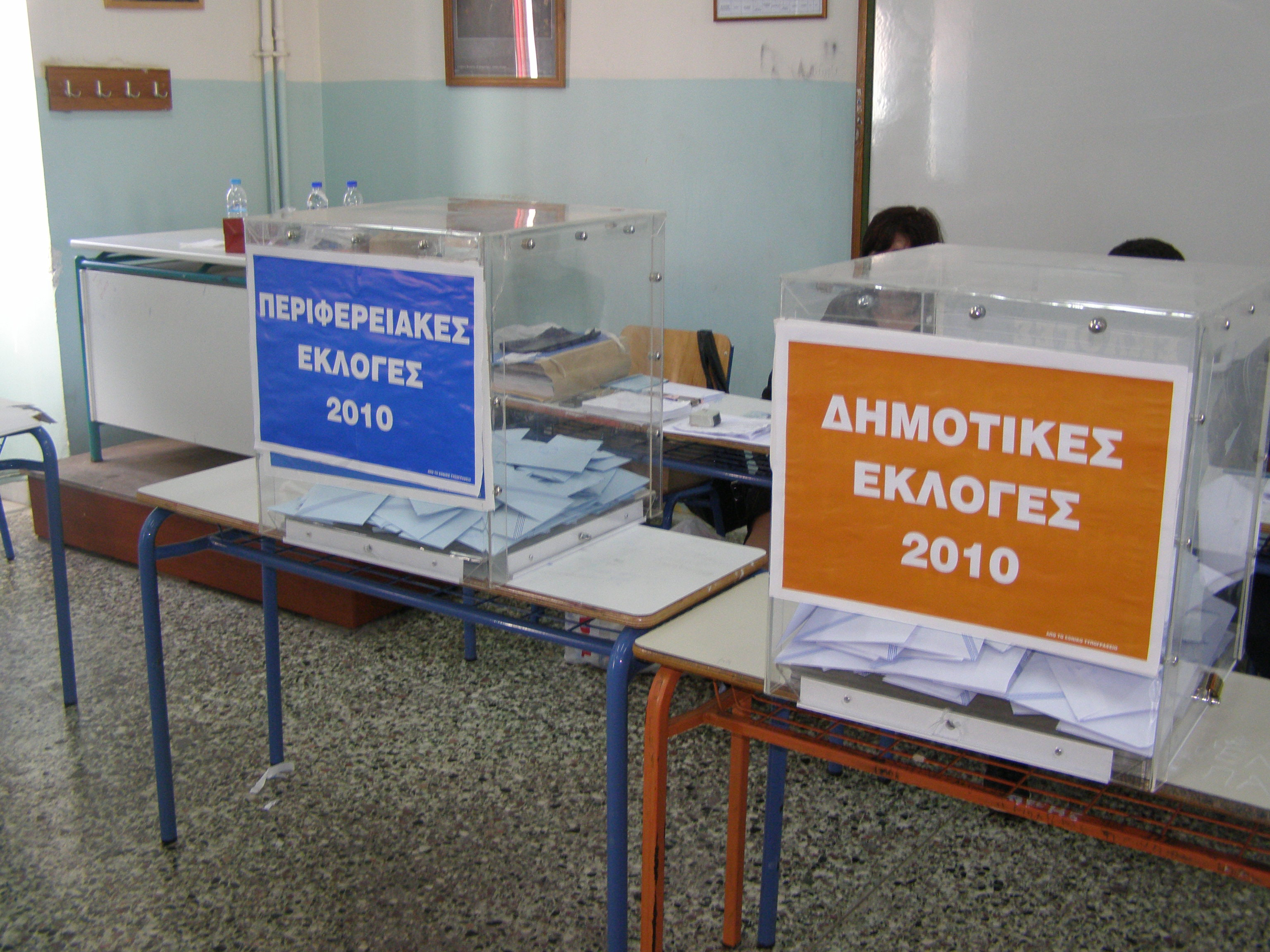
The ballot boxes for the 2010 elections: for the regions (left) and the municipalities (right)

The 2010 Greek local elections were held on 7 November 2010 (first round) and 14 November 2010 (second round) to elect representatives to Greece's restructured local authorities, comprising 13 regions and 325 municipalities.

== Background ==
Traditionally, candidates at local elections do not run under the official name of any party as the constitution only foresees the participation of electoral lists (or "combinations") and not parties. Despite this theoretical independence and distinction, for all practical purposes most candidates run as local front organisations for political parties.

The election also comes at a time of increasing unrest in Greece following numerous bombs being sent to foreign embassies, as well protests against austerity measures forced by the EU and IMF in order for Greece to receive external financial support.

== Issues ==
With the economy being touted as the mandate sought in the election Prime Minister George Papandreou said he would dissolve the national parliament should the candidates of his Panhellenic Socialist Movement (PASOK) fail to win an unspecified threshold. "Citizens will decide in today's election if we will hold steady on the path of salvation... or if we will go back to decay and to the Greece of bankruptcy."

== Election results ==
=== Major municipalities ===
In the municipalities, as well as the regions, any candidate can participate in the first round. If the leading candidate doesn't have the required 50%+1 of the votes, then a second round is held between the two leading candidates of the first round.

==== Athens ====
Candidate	Supporting Party	1st round %	2nd round %	Seats
Georgios Kaminis	Panhellenic Socialist Movement - Ecologist Greens - Democratic Left- Portokali (Drasi & Liberal Alliance)	28.28	51.95	29
Nikitas Kaklamanis	New Democracy - Popular Orthodox Rally	34.97	48.05	11
Nikolaos Sofianos	Communist Party of Greece	13.74		3
Georgios Amyras	Independent	7.37		2
Eleni Portaliou	Coalition of Radical Left	5.8		2
Nikolaos Michaloliakos	Golden Dawn	5.29		1
Petros Konstantinou	Anticapitalist Left Cooperation for the Overthrow	2.87		1
Michail Iliadis	Koinonia	1.68		–

==== Thessaloniki ====
Candidate	Supporting Party	1st Round %	2nd Round %	Seats
Ioannis Boutaris	Panhellenic Socialist Movement - Democratic Left- Drasi	33.58	50.16	29
Konstantinos Gioulekas	New Democracy	37.91	49.84	13
Sotirios Zarianopoulos	Communist Party of Greece	9.5		2
Stelios Papathemelis	Independent	6.04		2
Triantafyllos Mitafidis	Coalition of Radical Left	3.67		1
Armodios Stergiou	Popular Orthodox Rally	3.58		1
Christos Matis	Ecologist Greens	3.45		1
Zisis Klisiaris	Anticapitalist Left Cooperation for the Overthrow	1.28		–
Konstantinos Vasilikos	Golden Dawn	1.0		–

==== Heraklion ====
Candidate	Supporting Party	1st Round %	2nd Round %	Seats
Ioannis Kourakis	Panhellenic Socialist Movement	71.82		35
Emmanouil Sintichakis	Communist Party of Greece	12.13		6
Anastasios Iliadakis	Independent	9.55		5
Konstantinos Kabitakis	Coalition of Radical Left & Ecologist Greens	6.5		3

==== Patras ====
Candidate	Supporting Party	1st Round %	2nd Round %	Seats
Ioannis Dimaras (Patras)	Coalition of Radical Left - Democratic Left	21.13	53.63	29
Dimitrios Katsikopoulos	Panhellenic Socialist Movement	35.07	46.37	9
Konstantinos Christopoulos	New Democracy	17.7		4
Konstantinos Peletidis	Communist Party of Greece	16.52		4
Christos Patouchas	Anticapitalist Left Cooperation for the Overthrow	4.48		1
Andreas Tzouramanis	Independent	2.64		1
Dimitrios Aivalis	Independent	2.46		1

==== Piraeus ====
Candidate	Supporting Party	1st Round %	2nd Round %	Seats
Vasilios Michaloliakos	New Democracy	23.08	51.76	29
Ioannis Michas	Panhellenic Socialist Movement	29.61	48.24	8
Petros Mantouvalos	Popular Orthodox Rally	18.73		5
Elpida Pantelaki	Communist Party of Greece	14.77		4
List of candidates entitled "Alliance for Piraeus"	Coalition of Radical Left - Democratic Left - Ecologist Greens	7.58		2
Antonios Kalogerogiannos	Independent	3.44		1
Athanasios Diavolakis	Anticapitalist Left Cooperation for the Overthrow	2.71		–

==== Peristeri ====
Candidate	Supporting Party	1st Round %	2nd Round %	Seats
Andreas Pachatouridis	Independent	49.76	65.62	27
Dimitrios Kelafas	Democratic Left	14.54	34.38	9
Konstantinos Lalenis	Panhellenic Socialist Movement	12.62		3
Grigoris Timplalexis	Communist Party of Greece	12.54		3
Sofia Alexopoulou	Coalition of Radical Left	3.85		1
Athanasios Vathiotis	Independent	3.73		1
Antonia Athanasopoulou	Anticapitalist Left Cooperation for the Overthrow	2.96		1

=== Regions ===
Source: Hellenic Ministry of the Interior

==== Attica ====
Candidate	Supporting Party	1st Round	%	Seats	2nd Round	%	Seats	Total seats
Ioannis Sgouros	Panhellenic Socialist Movement	342,555	24.05	12	522,838	52.87	49	61
Vasileios Kikilias	New Democracy	292,113	20.44	11	466,134	47.13	1	12
Ioannis Dimaras (Athens)	Independent †	227,314	15.96	8				8
Thanasis Pafilis	Communist Party of Greece	205,742	14.45	8				8
Adonis Georgiadis	Popular Orthodox Rally	93,580	6.57	3				3
Alexios Mitropoulos	Coalition of Radical Left §	88,703	6.28	3				3
Konstantinos Diakos	Ecologist Greens	57,528	4.04	2				2
Grigoris Psarianos	Democratic Left	54,248	3.81	2				2
Aggelos Hagios	Anticapitalist Left Cooperation for the Overthrow	32,547	2.29	1				1
Alekos Alavanos	Independent ‡	30,816	2.16	1				1

Notes:
† Ioannis Dimaras was elected a parliament member with Panhellenic Socialist Movement in the National Elections of 2009.

§ Alexios Mitropoulos is a member of the National Council of the Panhellenic Socialist Movement.

‡ Alekos Alavanos is a prominent member of the Coalition of Radical Left, and although his party didn't support him officially, some fractions such as KOE, DEA and KEDA did.

==== Central Greece ====
Candidate	Supporting Party	1st Round	%	Seats	2nd Round	%	Seats	Total seats
Klearchos Pergantas	Panhellenic Socialist Movement	126,020	39.02	10	130,189	52.93	21	31
Athanasios Cheimaras	New Democracy	116,399	35.2	9	115,766	47.07	4	13
Georgios Marinos	Communist Party of Greece	35,954	10.87	3				3
Nikolaos Papandreou	Popular Orthodox Rally	26,324	7.96	2				2
Nikolaos Stoupis	Coalition of Radical Left	12,319	3.7	1				1
Despoina Spanoudi	Ecologist Greens- Democratic Left	10,753	3.25	1				1

==== Central Macedonia ====
Candidate	Supporting Party	1st Round	%	Seats	2nd Round	%	Seats	Total seats
Panagiotis Psomiadis	New Democracy	421,859	43.19	16	406,890	52.56	27	43
Markos Bolaris	Panhellenic Socialist Movement	299,633	30.68	11	367,272	47.44	8	19
Theodosios Konstantinidis	Communist Party of Greece	88,739	9.09	3				3
Kyriakos Velopoulos	Popular Orthodox Rally	64,236	6.58	2				2
Anastasios Kourakis	Coalition of Radical Left	35,536	3.64	1				1
Michael Tremopoulos	Ecologist Greens	30,358	3.11	1				1
Asimina Xyrotyri-Asimaki	Democratic Left	19,724	2.02	1				1
Ioannis Koutras	Anticapitalist Left Cooperation for the Overthrow	16,644	1.70	1				1

==== Crete ====
Candidate	Supporting Party	1st Round	%	Seats
Stavros Arnaoutakis	Panhellenic Socialist Movement	165,726	50.3	31
Dimitrios Giannoulakis	Independent †	57,735	17.52	7
Ioannis Plakiotakis	New Democracy	49,025	14.88	6
Stylianos Orfanos	Communist Party of Greece	22,863	6.93	3
Georgios Stathakis	Coalition of Radical Left	16,224	4.92	2
Antonios Anipsitakis	Ecologist Greens- Democratic Left	12,616	3.83	1
Serafeim Rizos	Anticapitalist Left Cooperation for the Overthrow	5,302	1.61	1

Notes:
† Dimitrios Giannoulakis was independent at the time of the elections, but was supported by Dora Bakoyannis and is closely related to her newly founded Democratic Alliance party

==== Eastern Macedonia and Thrace ====
Candidate	Supporting Party	1st Round	%	Seats	2nd Round	%	Seats	Total seats
Aris Giannakidis	Panhellenic Socialist Movement	150,257	41.75	11	158,262	51.49	20	31
Giorgos Pavlidis	New Democracy	147,845	41.08	11	149,101	48,51	5	16
Christos Trellis	Communist Party of Greece	27,852	7.74	2				2
Dimitris Charitou	Coalition of the Radical Left	16,609	4.62	1				1
Athanasios Makris	Ecologist Greens	10,787	3.00	1				1
Georgios Botsidis	Anticapitalist Left Cooperation for the Overthrow	6,523	1.81	–				–

==== Epirus ====
Candidate	Supporting Party	1st Round	%	Seats	2nd Round	%	Seats	Total seats
Alexandros Kachrimanis	New Democracy & Popular Orthodox Rally	100,465	44.76	12	97,667	55.04	19	31
Evangelos Argyris	Panhellenic Socialist Movement	86,893	38.7	10	79,775	44.96	6	16
Konstantinos Konstantis	Communist Party of Greece	18,766	8.36	2				2
Ioannis Papadimitriou	Coalition of Radical Left	8,054	3.59	1				1
Nikolos Zikos	Anticapitalist Left Cooperation for the Overthrow	5,915	2.63	1				1
Georgios Zapsas	Ecologist Greens-Democratic Left	4,407	1.96	–				–

==== Ionian Islands ====
Candidate	Supporting Party	1st Round	%	Seats	2nd Round	%	Seats	Total seats
Spyridon Spyrou	New Democracy	34,302	30.4	6	43,330	50.80	19	25
Ilias Beriatos	Panhellenic Socialist Movement	28,832	25.55	5	41,966	49.20	1	6
Giorgos Kaloudis	Independent	22.290	19.76	4				4
Theodoros Goulis	Communist Party of Greece	17,226	15.3	3				3
Theodoros Galatsiatos	Coalition of Radical Left & Ecologist Greens	4,940	4.38	1				1
Sotirios Vlachos	Democratic Left	2,691	2.39	1				1
Antonia Lachanioti	Anticapitalist Left Cooperation for the Overthrow	2,509	2.22	1				1

==== North Aegean ====
Candidate	Supporting Party	1st round	%	Seats	2nd round	%	Seats	Total seats
Athanasios Giakalis	Panhellenic Socialist Movement	38,952	36.32	8	43,151	50.77	17	25
Pavlos Vogiatzis	New Democracy & Popular Orthodox Rally	41,054	38.28	8	41,842	49.23	3	11
Efstratios Korakas	Communist Party of Greece	16,877	15.74	3				3
Vasileios Tentomas	Coalition of Radical Left	4,517	4.21	1				1
Ilias Gianniris	Ecologist Greens	3,453	3.22	1				1
Ignatios Tsirpelis	Anticapitalist Left Cooperation for the Overthrow	2,393	2.23	–				–

==== Peloponnese ====
Candidate	Supporting Party	1st Round	%	Seats	2nd Round	%	Seats	Total seats
Petros Tatoulis	Panhellenic Socialist Movement & Popular Orthodox Rally	157,597	41.71	11	156,960	52.53	20	31
Dimitrios Drakos	New Democracy	154,691	40.94	11	141,863	47.47	5	16
Nikolaos Gontikas	Communist Party of Greece	25,669	6.79	2				2
Athanasios Petrakos	Coalition of Radical Left	14,835	3.93	2				2
Lambros Bouklis	Ecologist Greens	7,212	1.91	1				1
Panagiotis Katsaris	Anticapitalist Left Cooperation for the Overthrow	6,443	1.71	–				–
Georgios Tsogas	Democratic Left	5,920	1.57	–				–
Theodoros Sabaziotis	Golden Dawn	5,468	1.45	–				–

==== South Aegean ====
Candidate	Supporting Party	1st round	%	Seats
Ioannis Machairidis	Panhellenic Socialist Movement	86,735	50.9	31
Charalambos Kokkinos	New Democracy	52,973	31.08	13
Efthalia Kafantari	Communist Party of Greece	15,401	9.04	4
Nikolaos Syrmalenios	Coalition of Radical Left	8,751	5.14	2
Nikolaos Chrysogelos	Ecologist Greens	6,558	3.85	1

==== Thessaly ====
Candidate	Supporting Party	1st Round	%	Seats	2nd Round	%	Seats	Total seats
Konstantinos Agorastos	New Democracy	170,323	38.59	10	174,134	50.56	21	31
Apostolos Papatolias	Panhellenic Socialist Movement	153,821	34.85	9	170,273	49.44	4	13
Evangelos Boutas	Communist Party of Greece	57,831	13.1	3				
Asterios Rondoulis	Popular Orthodox Rally	19,592	4.44	1				
Konstantinos Poulakis	Coalition of Radical Left	13,571	3.08	1				
Dimitrios Kouretas	Ecologist Greens	12,015	2.72	1				
Theofanis Genikomsiou	Anticapitalist Left Cooperation for the Overthrow	7,444	1.69	1				
Athanasios Zacharopoulos	Democratic Left	6,720	1.52	–				

==== West Greece ====
Candidate	Supporting Party	1st Round	%	Seats	2nd Round	%	Seats	Total seats
Apostolos Katsifaras	Panhellenic Socialist Movement	169,002	43.32	11	142,891	56.63	20	31
Georgios Papanastasiou	New Democracy	104,148	26.7	7	109,418	43.37	5	12
Nikolaos Karathanasopoulos	Communist Party of Greece	43,455	11.14	3				3
Konstantinos Papakonstantinou	Ecologist Greens	15,969	4.09	1				1
Nikolaos Tsoukalis	Democratic Left	15,077	3.86	1				1
Vasilis Chatzilambrou	Coalition of Radical Left	14,415	3.7	1				1
Alexandros Chrysanthakopoulos	Popular Orthodox Rally	11.842	3.04	1				1
Dimitrios Desyllas	Anticapitalist Left Cooperation for the Overthrow	8,892	2.28	1				1
Christos Rigas	Golden Dawn	7,318	1.88	–				–

==== West Macedonia ====
Candidate	Supporting Party	1st Round	%	Seats	2nd Round	%	Seats	Total seats
Konstantinos Dakis	New Democracy	89,273	46.3	12	79,216	51.81	19	31
Ioannis Papaiordanidis	Panhellenic Socialist Movement	74,050	38.4	10	73,675	48.19	6	16
Antonios Tsakonas	Communist Party of Greece	15,851	8.22	2				2
Antonis Kyrinas	Coalition of Radical Left & Ecologists Greens	6,283	3.26	1				1
Pavlos Altinis	Popular Orthodox Rally	4,619	2.4	1				1
Spyridon Konstantinidis	Anticapitalist Left Cooperation for the Overthrow	2,755	1.43	–				–

=== National summary ===
==== Councils and Councillors of the regions ====
Party	Councils				Councillors			
Party	Gain	Loss	Change	Total	Gain	Loss	Change	Total
PASOK	7	n/a	n/a	7	342	n/a	n/a	342
ND	3	n/a	n/a	3	180	n/a	n/a	180
New Democracy/ Popular Orthodox Rally	2	n/a	n/a	2	80	n/a	n/a	80
Panhellenic Socialist Movement/ Popular Orthodox Rally	1	n/a	n/a	1	31	n/a	n/a	31
KKE	0	n/a	n/a	0	42	n/a	n/a	42
Coalition of the Radical Left	0	n/a	n/a	0	15	n/a	n/a	15
LAOS	0	n/a	n/a	0	10	n/a	n/a	10
OP	0	n/a	n/a	0	9	n/a	n/a	9
Anticapitalist Left Cooperation for the Overthrow	0	n/a	n/a	0	7	n/a	n/a	7
DIMAR	0	n/a	n/a	0	5	n/a	n/a	5
Coalition of Radical Left; Ecologist Greens	0	n/a	n/a	0	2	n/a	n/a	2
Ecologist Greens/ Democratic Left	0	n/a	n/a	0	2	n/a	n/a	2
Summary				13				725

==== Nationwide percentage results ====
Party	Nationwide results	Change from the 2009 parliamentary elections
PASOK	34.7	-9.3
ND	32.8	-0.7
KKE	10.9	+3.4
Coalition of the Radical Left	5.0	+0.4
LAOS	4.0	-1.6
OP	2.8	+0.3
DIMAR	2.2	+2.2
Anticapitalist Left Cooperation for the Overthrow	1.8	+1.4
All others	5.9	

== Reaction ==
The government saw its share of vote drop by 9% but it remained the largest party. Prime Minister Papandreou said that he would continue with tough austerity measures to alleviate Greece's debt burden following a narrow victory in the election.
