= Giorgos Pavlidis =

Greek politician of Nea Dimokratia

- Γιώργος Παυλίδης
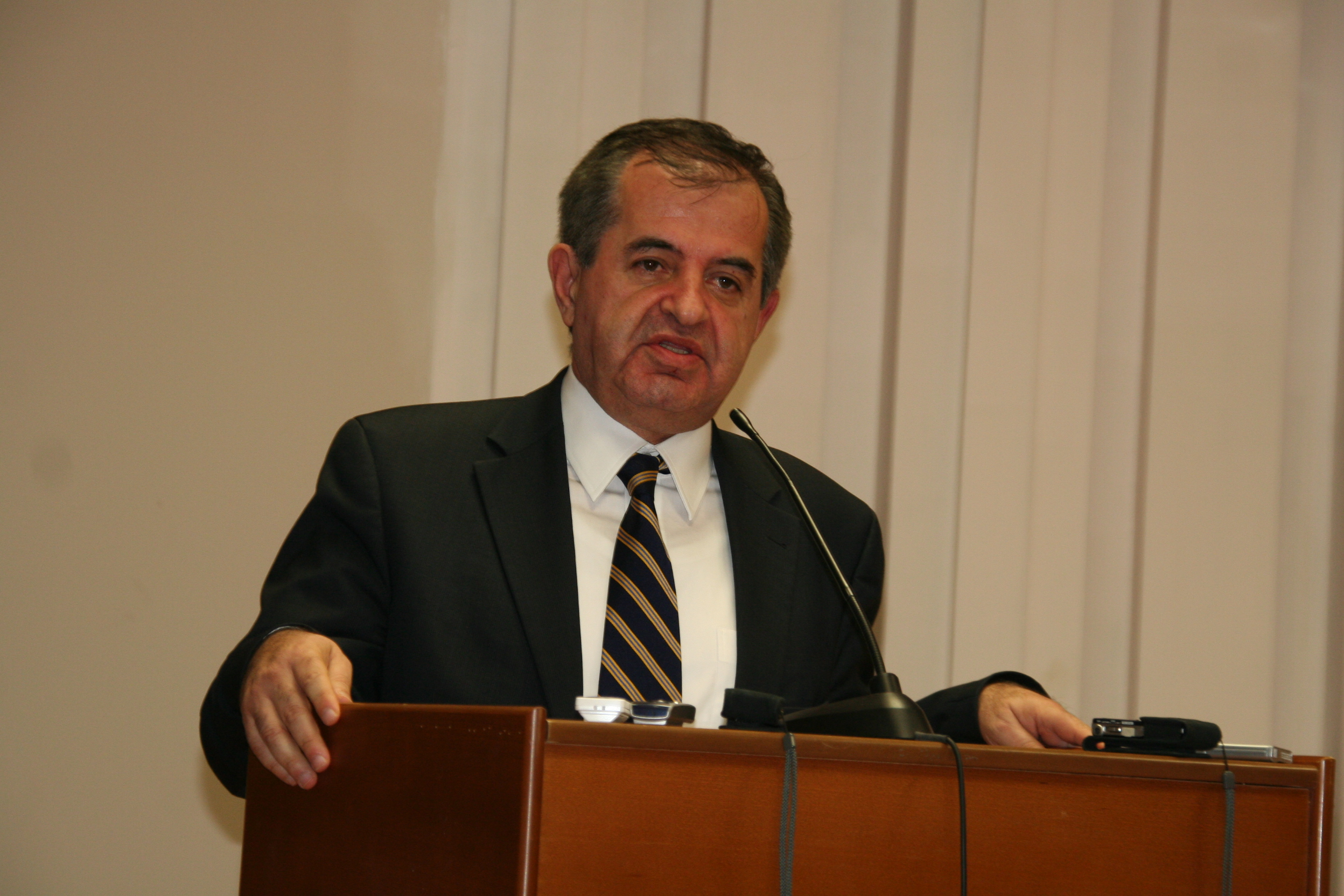

Regional Governor of Eastern Macedonia and Thrace
- In office 1 September 2014 – 20 October 2016
- Preceded by: Aris Giannakidis
- Succeeded by: Christos Metios

Prefect of Xanthi
- In office 1 January 1999 – 31 December 2010

Personal details
- Born: 1956
- Died: 20 October 2016 (aged 59–60)
- Party: Nea Dimokratia
- Education: Democritus University of Thrace
- Profession: Lawyer

Giorgos Pavlidis (Greek: Γιώργος Παυλίδης; 1956 – 20 October 2016) was a Greek politician of Nea Dimokratia. The long-standing Prefect of Xanthi was narrowly defeated in the 2010 local election, but was elected Governor of the region of Eastern Macedonia and Thrace in the subsequent 2014 election.

== Biography ==
Born 1956, Giorgos Pavlidis studied at Democritus University of Thrace graduating in law. Following his studies, he practised as a criminal defense lawyer and later contended for the rights of syndicalists, workers and farmers.

He was for the first time elected a member of the prefectural council of Xanthi in 1985, served in the local government since 1998. Running on a platform named "Renaissance" (Αναγέννηση) and supported by Nea Dimokratia, he was elected Prefect of Xanthi in the 1998 prefectural election, to be reelected in 2002 and 2006.

In 2004 Pavlidis initiated the Cross-border cooperation network of neighboring Greek, Bulgarian and Turkish prefectures, based in Orestiada. Nominated by the Union of Prefectural Administrations of Greece, Pavlidis has been the head of the Greek delegation to the Congress of the Council of Europe from 2007 until 2012, where he affiliates with the European People's Party group.

When in 2010 Greek prefectures were set to be abolished as part of the Kallikratis reform, he contended the 2010 regional election but was narrowly defeated by the prefect of Rodopi, Aris Giannakidis. In the subsequent 2014 regional election, he however clearly defeated the incumbent Giannakidis with 56.34% in the second round. He died of cancer on 20 October 2016, aged 60.
