= Giorgos Kaminis =

Greek politician (born 1954)

- Γεώργιος Καμίνης
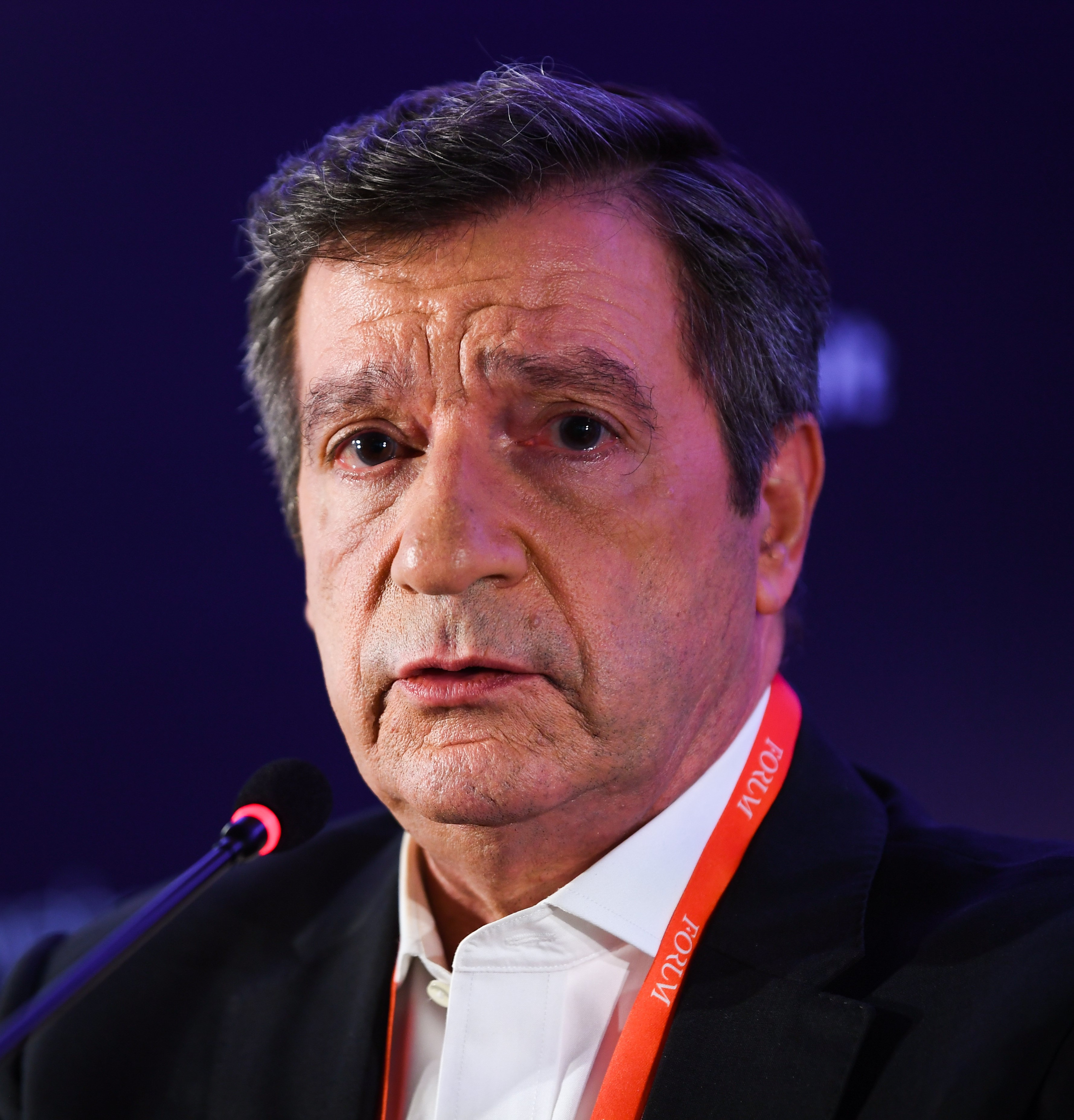
- Kaminis in 2018

Mayor of Athens
- In office 1 January 2011 – 1 May 2019
- Preceded by: Nikitas Kaklamanis
- Succeeded by: Georgios Broulias (acting)

Greek Ombudsman
- In office April 2003 – September 2010
- Preceded by: Nikiforos Diamandouros
- Succeeded by: Calliope Spanou

Member of the Hellenic Parliament
- In office 7 July 2019 – 22 April 2023

Personal details
- Born: July 15, 1954 (age 72) New York City, U.S.
- Party: Renewal; Movement for Change
- Other political affiliations: PASOK
- Education: University of Athens; Panthéon-Assas University; Panthéon-Sorbonne University
- Profession: Politician; Lawyer
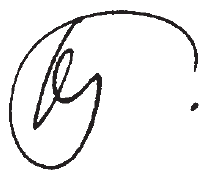
- Signature

Georgios Kaminis (Greek: Γεώργιος Καμίνης; born 15 July 1954) is a Greek American politician and professor of constitutional law. He was the Greek Ombudsman from April 2003 until September 2010 and Mayor of Athens from 2011 until 2019.

== Early life ==
Giorgos Kaminis was born in New York City, where his father, Vasilis Kaminis was working at the time. He holds both Greek and American citizenship. At the age of five he left New York and moved to Athens.

== Education ==
He studied at the Faculty of Law of the University of Athens, graduating in 1980. He conducted postgraduate studies in public law at Panthéon-Assas University, gaining a MAS in 1982, followed by the Panthéon-Sorbonne University, where he obtained a doctorat d'État en droit in 1989.

== Career ==
In November 1982, he was hired as a research and teaching fellow at the Faculty of Law of the University of Athens. He was elected a lecturer in 1991 and an assistant professor in 1998.

From September 1989, he has been a research fellow at the Department of Parliamentary Studies and Research of the Directorate of Studies of the Greek Parliament.

=== Greek Ombudsman ===
Αfter serving as a Deputy Ombudsman for Human Rights, from 1998 to 2003, he served as the Greek Ombudsman from April 2003 until his resignation in September 2010, to run in upcoming local elections.

=== Mayor of Athens ===
Kaminis was elected Mayor of Athens after the second round of the Greek local elections of 2010. Kaminis, who ran as an independent, had been nominated by the small, newly formed Democratic Left party and was also backed by the country's ruling Panhellenic Socialist Movement, the Ecologist Greens and Portokali (Drassi and the Liberal Alliance). He won 52% of the vote in the second round of voting, defeating Nikitas Kaklamanis, the centre-right incumbent supported by New Democracy and the Popular Orthodox Rally. He was the first left-of-centre candidate elected mayor of the Greek capital, historically a conservative stronghold, in more than two decades. He was re-elected in 2014, defeating the Syriza candidate Gabriel Sakellaridis in the second round.

=== Renewal ===
On 24 February 2018, he announced the formation of a political tendency called Renewal (Greek: Ανανέωση) within the Movement for Change, a nascent political alliance of centre-left parties formed around PASOK. On 7 July 2019, he was one of the 12 candidates elected to the Hellenic Parliament through party-list proportional representation. On 22 June 2022, he announced that he would not contest the next election.

== Personal life ==
Kaminis is married to Adamantia Anagnostou, a lecturer at the University of Macedonia. They have two daughters, Angelina and Katerina-Markella.

== Publications ==
- Kaminis, Georges (1993). La transition constitutionnelle en Grèce et en Espagne. Librairie générale de droit et de jurisprudence. ISBN 978-2-275-00532-4.
- Kaminis, Yorgos (1998). Illegally Obtained Evidence and Constitutional Guarantees of Human Rights: The Exclusion of Evidence in Criminal and Civil Proceedings. A. N. Sakkoulas. ISBN 960-232-805-3.

Political offices
| Preceded by Nikiforos Diamandouros | Greek Ombudsman; 2003–2010 | Succeeded by Kalliopi Spanou |
| Preceded by Nikitas Kaklamanis | Mayor of Athens; 2011–2019 | Succeeded by Georgios Broulias |
