= Konstantinos Agorastos =

Greek politician (born 1963)

- Κώστας Αγοραστός
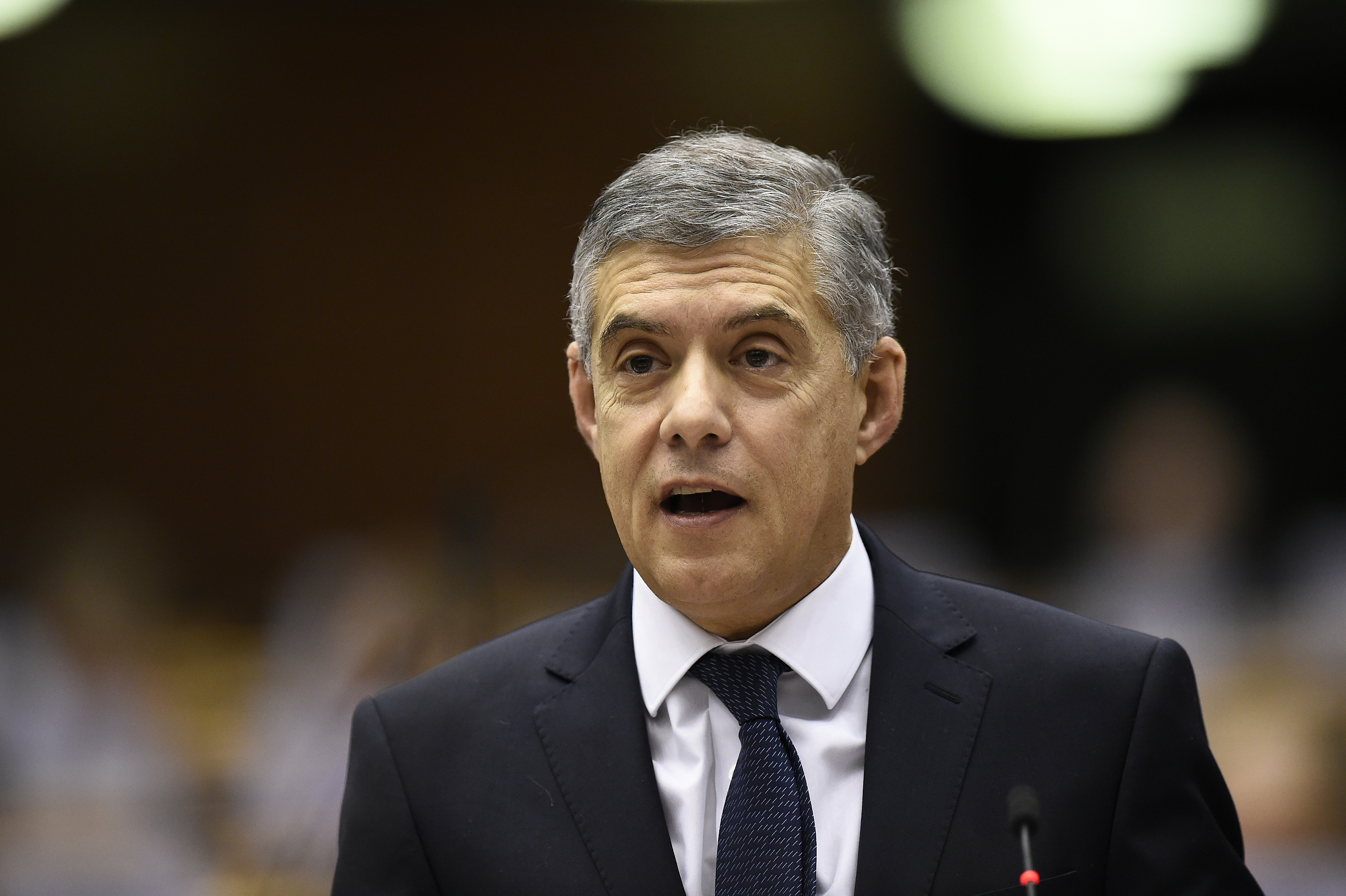

Regional Governor of Thessaly
- In office 1 January 2011 – 31 December 2023
- Succeeded by: Dimitrios Kouretas

Member of the Hellenic Parliament
- In office 7 March 2004 – 7 September 2009

Personal details
- Born: 1963; Larissa, Greece
- Political party: New Democracy
- Education: University of Piraeus
- Occupation: Politician

Konstantinos Agorastos (1963, Larissa, Greece) is a Greek politician, Governor of Thessaly during the period 2011–2023, and previously a Member of Greek Parliament, representing Larissa (2004–09).

== Biography ==
A graduate of the Piraeus School of Industry, he teaches as an associate professor at the University of Macedonia. He holds a PhD from the University of Bradford. He is married to Christina Panagi and they have 2 children.

After the municipal elections of 1998, he was elected as a councillor and president of the Larissa Municipal Council (1999–2004). He was elected as a member of parliament for Larissa in the 2004 and 2007 elections with New Democracy.

He was elected Governor of the Thessaly Region in the 2010 elections with 50.56% of the vote. He took office on 1 January 2011.

In a poll conducted in 2013, he was ranked the second most popular regional governor in Greece. He was elected in January 2011 on 1 January 2011.

In the May 2014 regional elections, he was re-elected as regional governor in the second round.

Agorastos was re-elected regional governor in the 2019 regional elections with 56% of the first round vote. In the 2023 regional elections he lost in the second round to Dimitris Kouretas.
