= Olga Gerovasili =

Greek politician (born 1961)

- Όλγα Γεροβασίλη
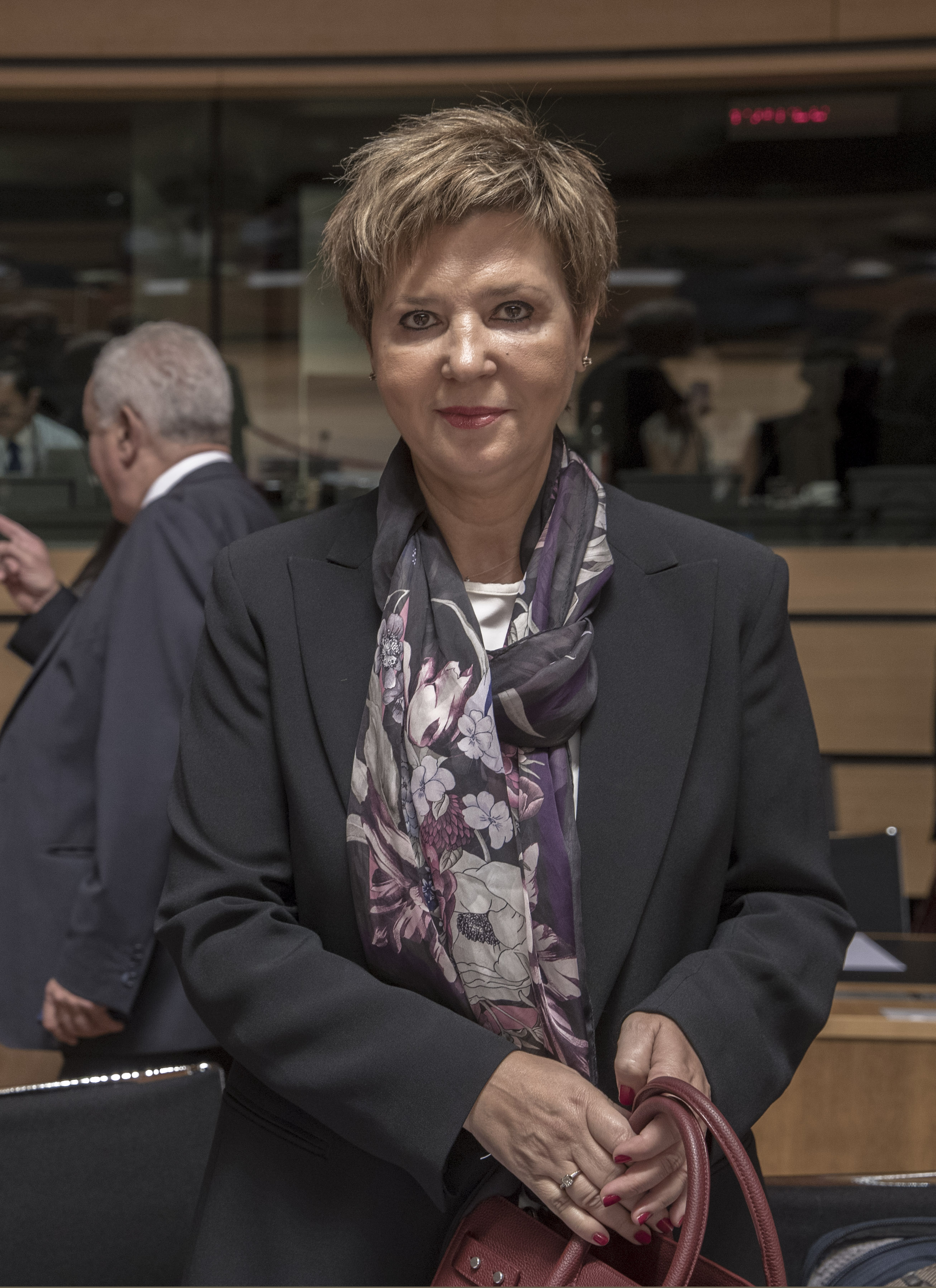
- Gerovasili in 2016

Deputy Speaker of the Hellenic Parliament
- Incumbent
- Assumed office 4 July 2023
- President: Konstantinos Tasoulas; Nikitas Kaklamanis

Member of the Hellenic Parliament
- Incumbent
- Assumed office 6 May 2012
- Constituency: Arta

Personal details
- Born: 16 January 1961 (age 65) Arta, Greece
- Party: Syriza (2012–2026)
- Other political affiliations: Synaspismos (2000–2012); Women for Another Europe (2004)
- Spouse: George Pappas
- Children: 3
- Education: National and Kapodistrian University of Athens
- Occupation: Politician; Doctor

Olga Gerovasili (Greek: Όλγα Γεροβασίλη; born 16 January 1961) is a Greek politician who has been serving as a member of the Hellenic Parliament for Arta since 17 May 2012.

== Early life ==
Born in Arta, she studied radiology at the National and Kapodistrian University of Athens. She then became secretary for the Arta Medical Society and the Medical Association in 1997 and 2003, respectively.

== Career ==
Gerovasili, who was politically active in university, first held political office in 1998, when she was elected to Arta's municipal board. She ran for Parliament in the 2000 and 2004 elections as an independent, but failed to win a seat. She then ran for Mayor of Arta as a member of an unaffiliated citizens group in 2006 and 2010, losing both elections. Two years later, she again ran for Parliament, this time as a member of the Syriza party, and won. As a member of Parliament, Gerovasili serves on the Standing Committee on Public Administration, as well as the Special Diaspora Permanent Committee.

In the 2014 Greek local elections, Gerovasili ran for Governor of Epirus. She finished with 24.6% of the vote, the highest of any Syriza-backed candidate in local elections, but lost to Alexandros Kachrimanis's 50.8%. After being re-elected in 2015, Gerovasili was nominated to the Cabinet position of Deputy Minister to the Prime Minister and Government Spokesperson.
