= Ioanna Kondouli =

Greek politician

- Ιωάννα Κοντούλη
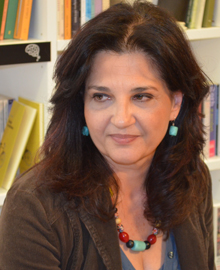

President of Ecologist Greens
- Incumbent
- Assumed office April 2012

Personal details
- Born: Athens, Greece
- Party: Ecologist Greens
- Children: 2
- Education: National Technical University of Athens
- Profession: Topographer engineer, Politician

Ioanna Kondouli is a Greek politician and topographer engineer who is leader of the Ecologist Greens party.

Kondouli was born in Athens in 1960. She graduated from Girls High School Campus B, where it still resides today. She then studied Surveying Engineering at National Technical University of Athens and did postgraduate studies in "Environment & Development". She has taught at the Technical University of Athens issues about photointerpretation and remote sensing, and since 2002 works in Management Organisation Unit of the Community Support Framework. She is the mother of two boys. She is actively involved in social initiatives such as inter-municipal committee to save the Hymettus and the "Citizens' Movement for the Rescue of the villa Campus" and defending human rights initiatives such as the "Ship to Gaza."

She joined the Ecologists Greens in the first steps of the party in 2003 and served a series of positions of responsibility. In the parliamentary elections of 2007 was a member of the editorial board of the electoral program and candidate B in Athens. In the elections of 2009 she participated in the ballot reached the representation of green ideas for the first time in parliamentary level. In the parliamentary elections of that year she was synepikefalis the campaign of the party. In 2010 she was the representative of the Green Ecologists in the national debate on education. In the recent election the Green Party Conference Green was elected head of the electoral campaign. However, she denied the advantages of the chief electoral combination and decided to seek the vote of the Athens second constituency.
