= Giannis Tsironis =

Greek politician and activist

- Γιάννης Τσιρώνης

Alternate Minister for Agricultural Development and Food
- In office 5 November 2016 – 29 August 2018
- Prime Minister: Alexis Tsipras
- Preceded by: Markos Bolaris
- Succeeded by: Nektarios Santorinios

Alternate Minister for the Environment and Energy
- In office 23 September 2015 – 5 November 2016
- Prime Minister: Alexis Tsipras
- Preceded by: Konstantinos Mousouroulis
- Succeeded by: Sokratis Famellos

Alternate Minister for the Environment and Energy
- In office 27 January 2015 – 27 August 2015
- Prime Minister: Alexis Tsipras
- Preceded by: Nikolaos Tagaras
- Succeeded by: Konstantinos Mousouroulis

Coordinator of the Executive Committee of the Ecologist Greens
- In office 2013 – January 2015

Personal details
- Born: 1958 (age 67–68) Athens, Greece
- Party: Ecologist Greens

Giannis Tsironis (Greek: Γιάννης Τσιρώνης; born 1958) is a Greek politician and activist. He is a member of the Ecologist Greens and their current spokesperson. From January to August 2015, he served as the Alternate Minister for the Environment and Energy in the First Cabinet of Alexis Tsipras, as part of an electoral alliance between the Ecologist Greens and Syriza. He resumed this role from September 2015 to November 2016, as part of the Second Cabinet of Alexis Tsipras, in which he also served as the Alternative Minister for Agricultural Development and Food from November 2016 to August 2018.

== Early life and education ==
Tsironis was born in Athens. He studied Chemistry at university and was very active in student political movements in the late 1970s and the early 1980s.

== Political career ==
Tsironis was a founding member of the EKO - Alternative Ecological Movement - in Athens in 1983. He was also a founding member of the Ecologist Greens in 2002, and is currently a member of their Pan-Hellenic Council as well as editor of the party newspaper, Prasini Politiki.

Tsironis was the Greek delegate to the Council of the European Green Party from 1999 to 2006 (it was known as the European Federation of Green Parties from 1993 to 2003).

Tsironis has been the Ecologist Green's spokesperson since 2011, and also served as the Coordinator of the Executive Committee from late 2013 to January 2015.

On 8 January 2015, following a meeting with Alexis Tsipras, the President of Syriza, Tsironis announced a policy of collaboration with Syriza for the January 2015 Greek legislative election.

== Personal life ==
Tsironis is married and has three children.
