= Technological Educational Institute of Western Greece =

Defunct tertiary education institute in Greece

Coordinates: 38.2195°N 21.7483°E

- Τεχνολογικό Εκπαιδευτικό Ίδρυμα Δυτικής Ελλάδας
- Type: Public university system University of Applied Sciences
- Active: 1983–2019
- President: Triantafillou Vasilis
- Students: 20,000
- Location: Patras, Western Greece, Greece
- Website: www.teiwest.gr}

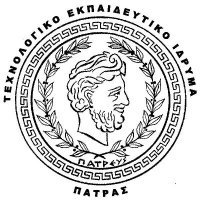
Seal of Technological Institute of Patras.

Seal of Technological Institute of Messolonghi (Christos Kapsalis, The Sortie of Missolonghi).

The Technological Educational Institute of Western Greece (Greek: Τεχνολογικό Εκπαιδευτικό Ίδρυμα Δυτικής Ελλάδας) was a Greek tertiary educational institution, based in Patras with more than 20,000 students.

== History ==
In the course of time, the former TEI of Western Greece had several names. It started its operation as KATEE in 1970 and then renamed as KATE. Later, with the founding law of TEI in 1983, it was renamed to TEI of Patras. In 2013 with the "Athena" Plan, the TEI of Patras and the TEI of Messolonghi merged and became the name of TEI of Western Greece. In 2019 by law 4610/2019 TEI of Western Greece is abolished and the schools STEG & TETROD, SDO and SEYP together with their departments are absorbed by the University of Patras, while the STEF is absorbed by the University of Peloponnese. This law comes to renew the map of Higher Education by creating, merging and removing schools and departments. The operation of most departments starts from the academic year 2019–2020.

=== Technological Educational Institute of Patras - TEIPAT ===
The Technological Educational Institute of Patras (TEIPAT; Greek: Τεχνολογικό Εκπαιδευτικό Ίδρυμα Πάτρας) was founded in 1970 as a higher technological educational center, located 4 km from the city center of Patras, in a 100 acres (0.40 km^{2}) campus. It was founded as an independent and self-governed public body that belonged to the Greek higher education according to Laws 2916/2001, 3549/2007, 3685/2008 and 3794/2009.

TEIPAT comprised the following faculties: School of Technological Applications, School of Management and Economy and School of Healthcare Science.

=== Technological Educational Institute of Missolonghi - TEIMES ===
Technological Educational Institute of Missolonghi (TEIMES; Greek: Τεχνολογικό Εκπαιδευτικό Ίδρυμα Μεσολογγίου) was a higher education public institute (university) specialized in applied technologies, located 4 km outside the city of Missolonghi. It was founded in 1981.

The institute had two campuses, the main campus in Missolonghi Area and the second campus in the city of Nafpaktos and comprised three Schools, each consisting of eight Departments.

=== "ATHENA" Reform Plan Merge ===
The "ATHENA" Reform Plan restructured Higher Education programmes in 2013. As a result, Technological Institutes of Messolonghi and Patras were merged to form Technological Institute of Western Greece. In 2019 the Technological Educational Institute of Western Greece was incorporated into the University of Patras [N.4610/109, ΦΕΚ 70/7,5,2019 (Α' 70)], while the engineering school was incorporated into the University of Peloponnese.

== Facilities ==
The former TEI headquarters Western Greece is located in the suburb Koukouli of Patras and is surrounded by the streets of Alexander the Great, Dominicos Theotokopoulou, Nikolaos Gyzi, Emmanouil Panselinou and Kalavryta. The headquarters of the university are Patras in six (6) cities of Western Greece (Patras, Mesolongi, Pyrgos, Nafpaktos, Antirrio, Amaliada and Aigio).The School of Agricultural Technology and Food and Nutrition Technology (STEG & TETROD) and the School of Management and Economics (SDO) were based in Mesolongi, while the School of Health and Welfare (SEYP) and the School of Technology .

== Schools and departments ==
The university includes four Schools, consisting of nineteen Departments.

Schools	Departments
School of Technological Applications (Patras)	Department of Electrical Engineering; Department of Mechanical Engineering; Department of Civil Engineering; Department of Computer and Informatics Engineering (Nafpaktos)
School of Health and Caring Professions (Patras)	Department of Social Work; Department of Speech and Language Therapy; Department of Nursing; Department of Optics and Optometry (Aigio); Department of Physical Therapy (Aigio)
School of Management and Economy (Missolonghi)	Department of Business Administration; Department of Accounting and Finance; Department of Management, Economics, Communication of Cultural and Hospitality Units (Pyrgos); Department of Informatics and Means of Mass Communication (Pyrgos); Department of Accounting Department (Patras); Department of Business Administration (Patras); Department of Management of Tourism Enterprises (Patras)
School of Agricultural Technology and Food and Nutrition Technology (Missolonghi)	Department of Mechanical and Water Resources Engineering; Department of Fisheries and Aquaculture Technology; Department of Agricultural Technology (Amaliada)

== Academic evaluation ==
In 2016 the external evaluation committee gave TEI of Western Greece a Partially positive evaluation.

An external evaluation of all academic departments in Greek universities was conducted by the Hellenic Quality Assurance and Accreditation Agency (HQA).

== See also ==
- List of universities in Greece
- University of Patras, a university located in Patras, established in 1964
- University of Peloponnese, a university located in various towns of Peloponnese, established in 2002
