= 2002 Greek local elections =

The 2002 Greek local elections elected representatives to Greece's super-prefectures, 54 prefectures, provinces, and approximately 1,033 communities and municipalities.

The local elections in Greece traditionally occur during the month of October.

Candidates at local elections do not run under the official name of the party they belong, but form electoral platforms with different names for the purpose.

== Elections ==
=== Municipal mayoralties ===
Candidates supported by New Democracy won in all the three major municipalities, Athens, Thessaloniki and Piraeus.

==== Municipality of Athens ====
Dora Bakoyannis, a prominent member of New Democracy, won the election and replaced Dimitris Avramopoulos as mayor of Athens (first term).

Candidate	Supporting parties	Platform	1st Round	%	Seats	2nd Round	%	Seats
Dora Bakoyannis	New Democracy	Athens tomorrow	160,425	47.5	10	180,898	60.5	25
Christos Papoutsis	Panhellenic Socialist Movement	Beautiful City	87,920	26	6	118,278	39.5	11
Spyros Halvatzis	Communist Party of Greece	Solidarity for Athens	20,305	6	1			
Fotis Kouvelis	Synaspismos	A different Athens	19,996	5.9	1			
Ioannis Dimaras	Democratic Social Movement	Athens - Our city	37,602	11.1	3			
Dimosthenis Vergis	Greek Ecologists	Ecologists of Athens - Dimosthenis Vergis	3,050	0.90	-			
Makis Voridis	Hellenic Front	Front for Athens - Athens, Hellenic city	3,023	0.90	-			
Aggelos Hagios	Radical Left Front	Undisciplined Athens	2,166	0.64	-			
Odysseas Tiligadas	Independent	First The Greeks	1,059	0.30	-			
Thanasses Tsirigotis	M-L KKE	People's Road	616	0.20	-			

==== Municipality of Piraeus ====
Christos Agrapidis was reelected mayor of Piraeus (second term) with the support of New Democracy.

Candidate	Supporting parties	Platform	1st Round	%	Seats	2nd Round	%	Seats
Christos Agrapidis	New Democracy	Time for Piraeus	53.417	47.00	10	58.554	56.10	24
Manolis Beteniotis	Panhellenic Socialist Movement	Piraeus firstly	35.345	31.10	7	45.871	43.90	12
Thodoris Dritsas	Synaspismos; Renewing Communist Ecological Left	The Port of Agony	8.522	7.50	2			
Konstantinos Tzatzanis	Communist Party of Greece	Piraeus' Renaissance	7.455	6.6	1			
Legakis Nikolaos	Independent		5.000	4.4				
Alfieri Styliani	Independent	Coalition of Piraeus' citizens	2.523	2.2				
Charitos Christos	Hellenic Front	Front for Piraeus	1.368	1.2				

==== Municipality of Thessaloniki ====
Vasilis Papageorgopoulos was reelected mayor of Thessaloniki with the support of New Democracy.

Candidate	Supporting parties	Platform	1st Round	%	Seats
Vasilis Papageorgopoulos	New Democracy	Resurgence	95.701	54.20	24
Spyros Vougias	Panhellenic Socialist Movement	Thessaloniki - Human city	49.206	27.90	10
Agapios Sahinis	Communist Party of Greece	Thessaloniki now	16.807	9.50	3
Tassos Kourakis	Synaspismos	Thessaloniki of the citizens and of ecology	11.082	6.30	2
Ioannis Kouriannidis	Hellenic Front	Front for Thessaloniki	2.142	1.2	-
Anastasia Theodoropoulou	Radical Left Front	Left movement	1.655	0.90	-

=== Super-Prefectural elections ===
==== Athens-Piraeus ====
Fofi Gennimata won the mainly ceremonial position of the super-prefect of Athens-Piraeus (first term) supported by PASOK. The coalition supported by New Democracy suffered a setback because of the unpopularity of Ioannis Tzanetakos and because of the candidacy of Georgios Karatzaferis.

Candidate	Supporting parties	Platform	1st Round	%	Seats	2nd Round	%	Seats
Fofi Gennimata	Panhellenic Socialist Movement	Super-prefecture of citizens	659.377	40.10	16	818.083	56.30	46
Ioannis Tzanetakos	New Democracy	Free self-government now	439.662	26.70	10	635.814	43.70	16
Georgios Karatzaferis	Popular Orthodox Rally	With a Pure Heart	223.531	13.60	4			
Manolis Glezos	Coalition of the Radical Left	Greek Prefecture - Active Citizens	177.411	10.80	4			
Thanasis Pafilis	Communist Party of Greece	Prefectural Fighting Cooperation	143.856	8.80	4			

Sub-prefectures of the Athens-Piraeus super-prefecture

Athens Prefecture

Elected prefect:Yiannis Sgouros (supported by PASOK)

Piraeus Prefecture

Elected Prefect:Yiannis Mihas (supported by PASOK)

==== Drama-Kavala-Xanthi ====
Candidate	Supporting parties	Platform	1st Round	%	Seats
Constantine Tatsis	New Democracy	Resurgence	131.697	51.60	45
Ioannis Stympiris	Panhellenic Socialist Movement; Synaspismos	Course of Development	112.240	44	27
Constantine Mollas	Communist Party of Greece	Inter-prefectural Fighting Rally	11.334	4.40	3

==== Evros-Rhodope ====
Candidate	Supporting parties	Platform	1st Round	%	Seats
Christos Chatzopoulos	Panhellenic Socialist Movement; Synaspismos	Unity-Creation-Perspective	92.047	50.70	30
Dimitrios Mouzas	New Democracy	New Society	75.906	41.80	18
Christos Trellis	Communist Party of Greece	Democratic Fighting Cooperation	13.536	7.50	3

=== Prefectural elections ===
==== Thessaloniki Prefecture ====
Candidate	Supporting parties	Platform	1st Round	%	Seats
Panagiotis Psomiadis	New Democracy	Power for the Prefecture	277.652	50.10	23
Grigorios Chatzisavvas	Panhellenic Socialist Movement	Prefecture of Thessaloniki as a Protagonist	190.099	34.30	10
Georgios Rokos	Democratic Social Movement / Communist Party of Greece	Prefectural Fighting Cooperation	44.323	8.0	3
Michalis Tremopoulos	Synaspismos	Ecology - Solidarity - Coalition of Citizens	23.471	4.20	1
Marianna Brekasi	Communist Organization of Greece	Left Prefectural Movement of Thessaloniki	10.197	1.80	-
Savvas Georgiadis	Independent	Fighters against Unemployment	8.431	1.50	-
