= Alexandros Markogiannakis =

Greek politician

Alexandros Markogiannakis is a Greek politician who is a member of the Hellenic Parliament.
