= Apostolos Katsifaras =

Greek politician (born 1959)

- Απόστολος Κατσιφάρας
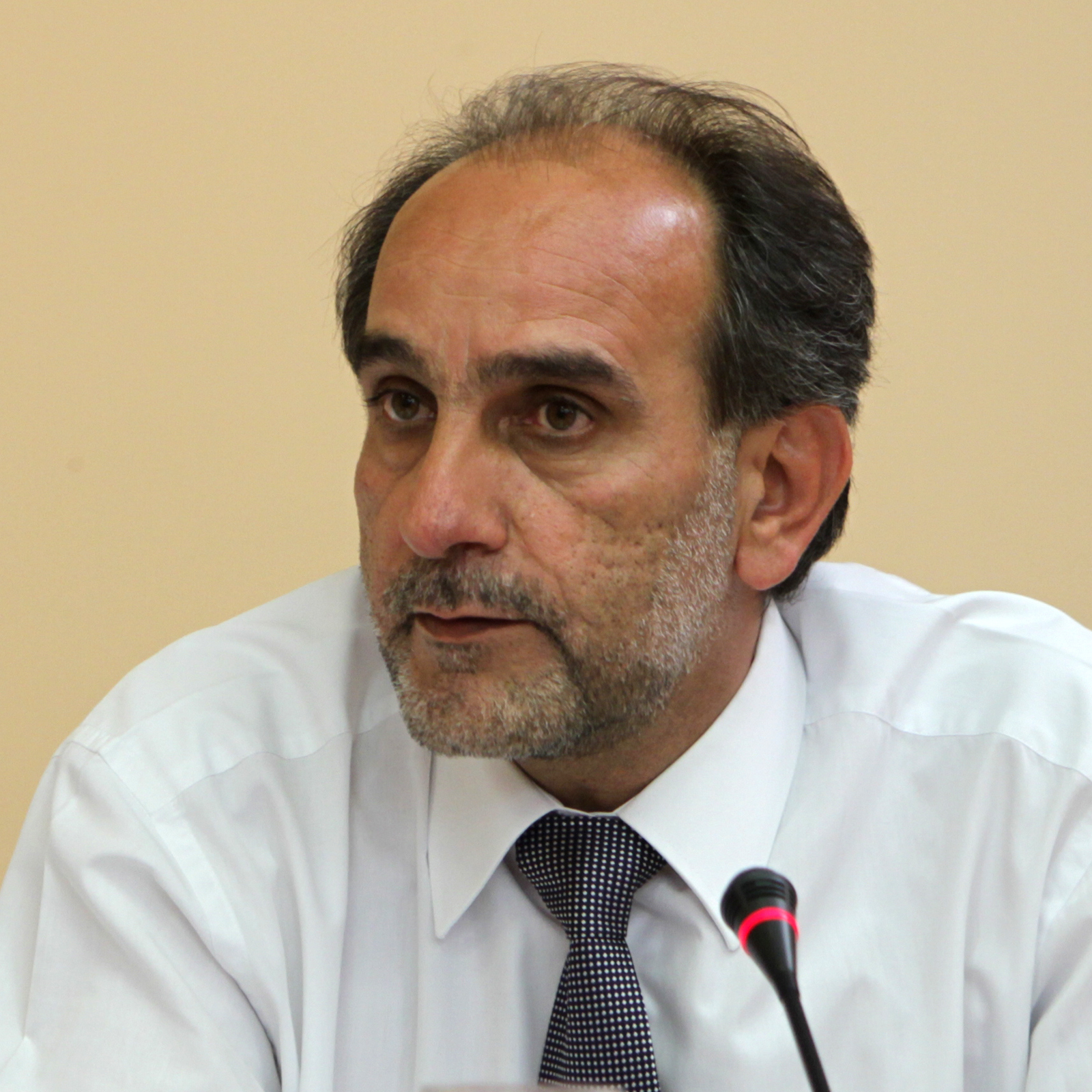

Member of the EU Committee of the Regions
- In office 21 March 2011 – 31 August 2019

Regional Governor of Western Greece
- In office 1 January 2011 – 31 August 2019

Deputy Minister of Justice, Transparency and Human Rights
- In office 7 October 2009 – 7 September 2010
- Prime Minister: George Papandreou

Personal details
- Born: 1959 Kalentzi, Achaea, Greece
- Party: PASOK
- Education: Technological Educational Institute of Patras

Apostolos Katsifaras (Greek: Απόστολος Κατσιφάρας; born 1959 in Kalentzi, Achaea) is a Greek politician with PASOK. From 2004 on, he served as a member of the Hellenic Parliament, and shortly held the post of a deputy minister. Katsifaras served as the Regional Governor of Western Greece from 2011 to 2019.

== Biography ==
=== Education and early career ===
Apostolos Katsifaras was born 1959 in Kalentzi and is a nephew of former government minister Georgios Katsifaras. From 1981, following his graduation from the School of Economics and Management of the Technological Educational Institute of Patras, he worked for the Greek National Tourism Organization. Since the 1994 prefectural election, he also served as a prefectural councillor of Achaea. He was appointed and served as the Deputy Prefect of Achaea from 1997 until 2000 and he was Alternate Prefect between 2003 and 2004.

=== National political career ===
Following the 2004 legislative election, Katsifaras assumed a seat in the Hellenic Parliament representing the Achaea constituency, and was reelected in 2007 and 2009. In October 2009, Prime minister George Papandreou appointed him Deputy Minister of Justice, Transparency and Human Rights.

In the wake of the stirring trial against the police officers who killed Alexandros Grigoropoulos, militants attacked Katsifaras' first floor office in the Exarcheia neighborhood of Athens twice, once in November, and again in January 2010. Katsifaras said "Democracy cannot be coerced, nor bullied, nor killed. It responds with further enhancing individual and social rights, protection of the weak and eliminating disparities. Humanizing prisons, improved detention conditions and the protection of human rights will continue to be at the core of our policy."

In September 2010 Katzifaras resigned from his post to run for the office of the Regional Governor of Western Greece.

=== Governor of Western Greece ===
Supported by his PASOK party, Katsifaras clearly distanced Nea Dimokratia's candidate Georgios Papanastasiou in the 2010 regional election's second round, and became the first governor of the region to be newly created in the course of the Kallikratis reform. During his term, he was also the 1st Vice President of the Union of Greek Regions (ENPE).

Since 2011, Katsifaras has been a Member of the European Union Committee of the Regions where he sits with the PES Group. He also serves as the 1st Vice President of the CPMR Intermediterranean Commission.

In the 2014 regional election, he repeated his electoral success, this time running an independent platform. With 50.5%, he narrowly defeated ND candidate Andreas Katsaniotis in the second round, to serve another and this time a five year term.
