= Christiana Kalogirou =

Greek economist and politician

- Χριστιάνα Καλογήρου

Regional Governor of the North Aegean
- In office 2014–2019
- Preceded by: Nasos Giakalis

Personal details
- Born: 1964 Athens, Kingdom of Greece
- Party: Nea Dimokratia
- Education: Athens University of Economics and Business
- Profession: Economist
- Website: www.christianakalogirou.gr

Christiana Kalogirou (Greek: Χριστιάνα Καλογήρου; born 1964 in Athens) is a Greek economist and politician of Nea Dimokratia. Since October 2014, she has been serving as Regional Governor of the North Aegean.

== Biography ==
Born 1964 in Athens, Kalogirou studied economics at Athens University of Economics and Business and became involved with DAP-NDFK, the student wing of Nea Dimokratia. Following her studies, who worked as a manager and consultant in private sector companies.

In the 2004 legislative election, she was elected a Member of the Hellenic Parliament for the Lesbos constituency. She lost her seat in 2007, but in August 2012, the Samaras government appointed her Secretary-General of the Decentralized Administration of the Aegean, a position she gave up in April 2014 to contest the 2014 regional election for the North Aegean.

With her electoral list named "We, in the Aegean", supported by Nea Dimokratia, Kalogirou finished first winning 31.51% of the vote. In the second round, she won 53.01%, thereby defeating the incumbent Nasos Giakalis, who was elected in 2010 for the PASOK party but this time ran on an independent ticket.

Following a complaint, the Administrative Court of Piraeus in August annulled the electoral result, on the grounds that Kalogirou had held a political office within the last 18 months of the election. On 2 October, the Council of State however overturned this decision, so she could assume her new office the same day.
