= Stavros Arnaoutakis =

Greek politician

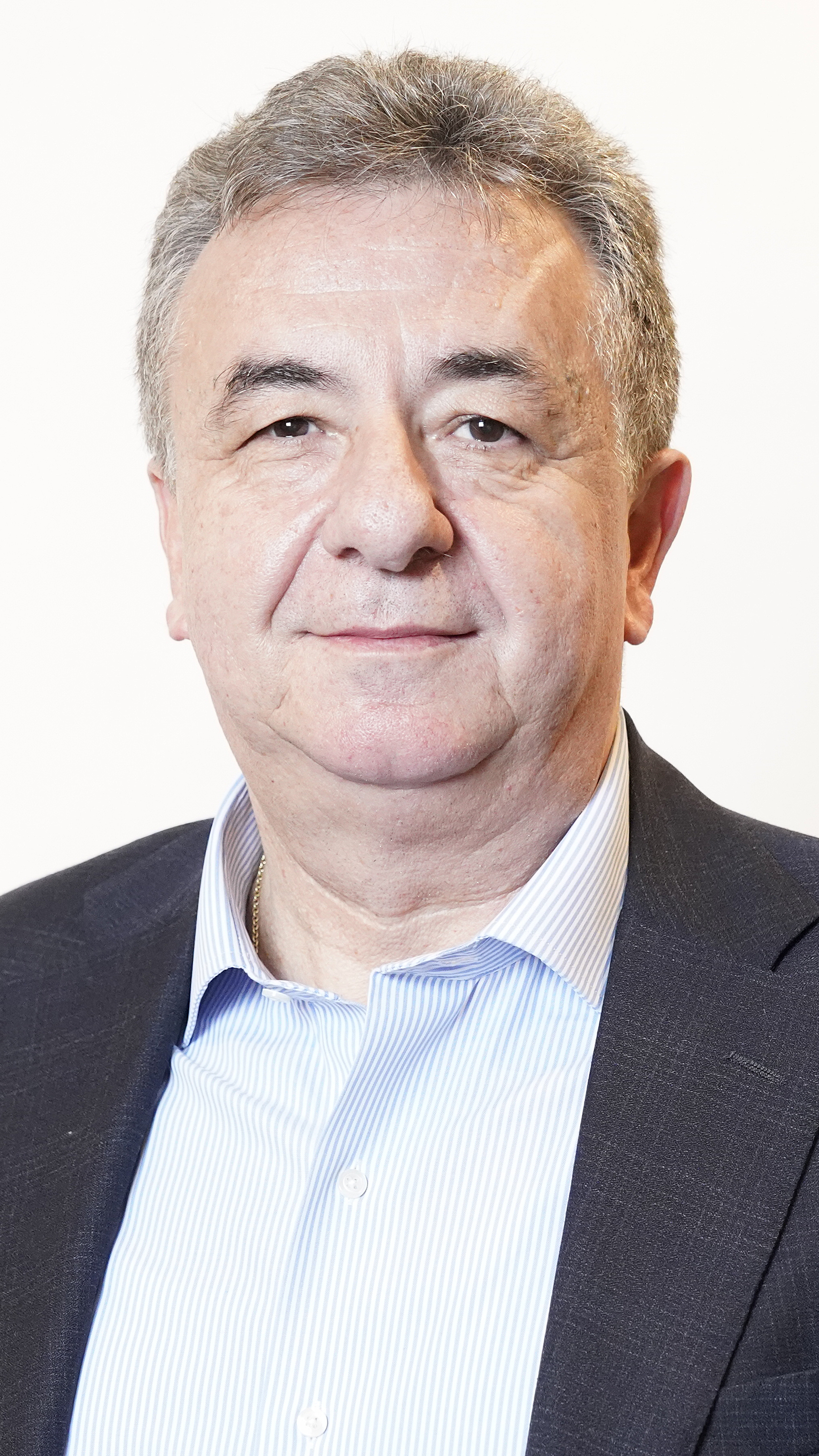
- Arnaoutakis in 2020

Governor of Crete
- Incumbent
- Assumed office January 1, 2011
- Preceded by: office established

Deputy Minister for the Economy, Competitiveness and Shipping
- In office October 7, 2009 – September 7, 2010

Member of the Hellenic Parliament for Heraklion
- In office October 2009 – December 2010

Member of the European Parliament
- In office 20 July 2004 – 13 July 2009

Personal details
- Born: May 25, 1956 (age 70) Archanes, Crete, Greece
- Party: PASOK – Movement for Change
- Other political affiliations: For our Crete
- Spouse: Irini Tzortzakaki
- Children: 2

Stavros Arnaoutakis (Greek: Σταύρος Αρναουτάκης; born 25 May 1956) is a Greek politician who has been the Governor of Crete since 2011. Prior to his tenure as governor he was a member of the European Parliament from 2004 to 2009, and a member of the Hellenic Parliament from 2009 to 2010.

== Early life and education ==
Stavros Arnaoutakis was born in Archanes, Crete, Greece, on 25 May 1956.

== Career ==
Arnaoutakis was elected mayor of Archanes in 1990, and served until 2004. He was president of the Heraklion Development Company from 1991 to 2004. The Heraklion Development Company was the first Greek company to have an office in Brussels.

In the 2004 election Arnaoutakis won a seat in the European Parliament as the 4th person on PASOK's electoral list. He sat with the Party of European Socialists group. During his tenure in parliament he served on the Fisheries and Regional Development committees. He was a member of the delegations to China and Romania.

In the 2009 election Arnaoutakis was elected to the Hellenic Parliament for Heraklion. During his tenure in parliament he was Deputy Minister of Economy, Competitiveness, and Shipping.

Arnaoutakis was elected governor of Crete in the 2010 election. He was reelected in the 2014, 2019, and 2023 elections. He has pushed for Knossos and other sites in Crete to be recognised as World Heritage Sites by UNESCO. Crete allotted €11.2 million, partially from the European Regional Development Fund, in 2025, for 13 projects to upgrade and expand water supply infrastructure.

== Works cited ==
=== News ===
- "Crete: 13 new water supply projects in municipalities on the island". Tornos News. 13 May 2025. Archived from the original on 1 July 2025.
- "Crete Prepares UNESCO Heritage List Bid for Knossos". To Vima. 3 May 2024. Archived from the original on 1 July 2025.

=== Web ===
- "6th parliamentary term". European Parliament. Archived from the original on 1 July 2025.
- "Regional Governor's CV". Crete. Archived from the original on 1 July 2025.
