= Petros Tatoulis =

Greek politician

- Πέτρος Τατούλης
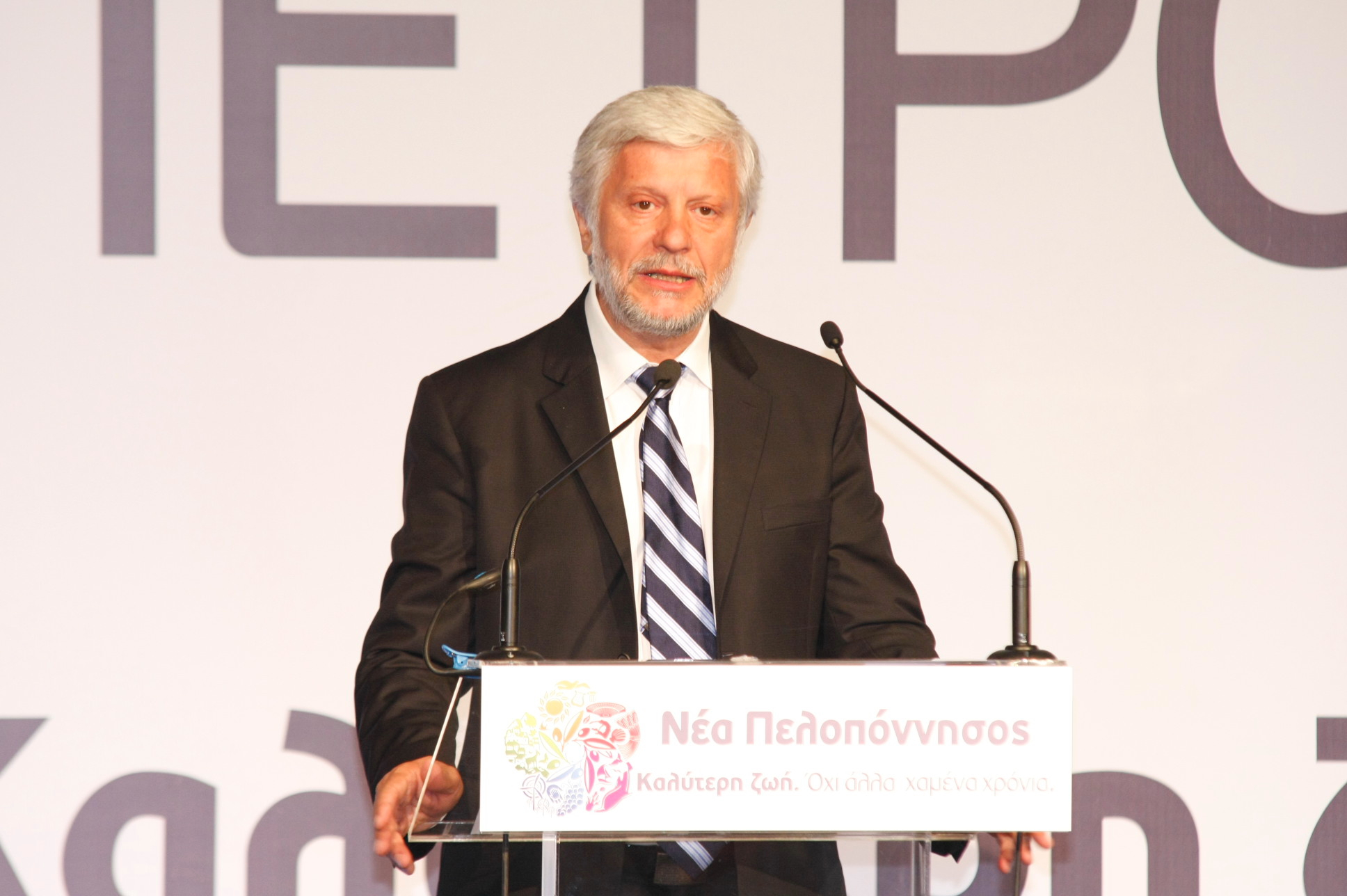

Regional Governor of the Peloponnese
- In office 1 January 2011 – 31 August 2019

Deputy Minister of Culture
- In office 10 March 2004 – 15 February 2006

Personal details
- Born: 6 March 1953 (age 73) Kastri, Arcadia, Greece
- Party: Independent; Nea Dimokratia (−2008)
- Education: Athens University
- Profession: Surgeon
- Website: www.tatoulis.gr

Petros Tatoulis (Greek: Πέτρος Τατούλης; born 6 March 1953 in Kastri, Arcadia) is a Greek surgeon and independent politician, who served as Regional Governor of the Peloponnese from 2011 to 2019.

A long standing Member of the Hellenic Parliament for Nea Dimokratia, he served as Deputy Minister of Culture from 2004 until 2006. When he became a succeedingly vocal critic of his party, he was expelled in 2008. In the 2010 elections, he was however popularly elected Regional governor of Peloponnese, and was reelected in 2014, following a reconciliation with his former party.

== Biography ==
Born 1953 in a small village in Cynuria, Tatoulis studied medicine at the National and Kapodistrian University of Athens and worked as a surgeon in hospitals in Arcadia, Athens and Piraeus.

=== MP and Deputy Minister of Culture ===
Following the 1990 legislative election, Petros Tatoulis served for six consecutive terms as a Member of the Hellenic Parliament for the Arcadia constituency. In the first Karamanlis cabinet (2004–2006), he was Deputy Minister for Culture under Prime minister Kostas Karamanlis who at the same time served as Minister for Culture.

He eventually became known as a "party rebel" though, and fought a number of disputes with his own party. In 2008 he condemned a conflict of interest of Minister of State Theodoros Roussopoulos regarding the role of his wife's job as a journalist and publisher, and asked for one of the two to step down. Prime minister Karamanlis rejected Tatoulis' reproaches: "Such views are anachronistic, if not medieval, about the role of women in modern society." He has also been a vocal critic in the affair around Christos Zahopoulos whom he had already distrusted when he was Deputy minister. Following an Ethnos interview in which Tatoulis railed against the government for failing to crack down on corruption, on 10 November he was finally expelled from both Nea Dimokratia's parliamentary faction and the party, but remained an independent MP until 2009.

=== Regional governor of Peloponnese ===
In the 2010 regional election, Tatoulis ran on an independent ticket for the governorship of the Peloponnese region. Supported by an unusual duet of social democratic PASOK and right-wing LAOS party, he defeated Nea Dimokratia's candidate Dimitrios Drakos in the second round winning 52.53% of the popular vote. He eventually reconciled with his former party so it subsequently supported him in the 2014 regional election when he was reelected defeating SYRIZA's candidate Odysseas Boudouris in the second round winning 59.35% of the electoral vote. Tatoulis lost reelection to Panagiotis Nikas in 2019.
