= Nikitas Kaklamanis =

Greek politician (born 1946)

- Νικήτας Κακλαμάνης
- Kaklamanis in 2025

Speaker of the Hellenic Parliament
- Incumbent
- Assumed office 22 January 2025
- President: Katerina Sakellaropoulou; Konstantinos Tasoulas
- Preceded by: Konstantinos Tasoulas

Mayor of Athens
- In office 1 January 2007 – 31 December 2010
- Preceded by: Theodoros Bechrakis (acting)
- Succeeded by: Giorgos Kaminis

Member of the Hellenic Parliament
- Incumbent
- Assumed office 6 May 2012
- Constituency: Athens A
- In office 9 April 2000 – 22 December 2006
- Constituency: Athens A
- In office 8 April 1990 – 23 May 1994
- Constituency: Athens A
Other political offices
Deputy Speaker of the Hellenic Parliament
In office 6 February 2015 – 4 July 2023
President	Zoe Konstantopoulou; Nikos Voutsis; Konstantinos Tasoulas
Minister for Health and Social Solidarity
In office 10 March 2004 – 14 February 2006
Prime Minister	Kostas Karamanlis
Preceded by	Costas Stefanis
Succeeded by	Dimitris Avramopoulos

Personal details
- Born: 1 April 1946 (age 80) Andros, Greece
- Party: New Democracy
- Other political affiliations: Political Spring (1993–2000)
- Education: National and Kapodistrian University of Athens

Nikitas Michail Kaklamanis (Greek: Νικήτας Κακλαμάνης; born 1 April 1946) is a Greek politician who has served as President of the Hellenic Parliament since 2025, and has been a member of parliament from Athens A multiple times since 1990.

== Early life and education ==
Nikitas Michail Kaklamanis was born in Andros, Greece, on 1 April 1946. He graduated from the National and Kapodistrian University of Athens (NKUA) in 1971, and specialized in radiation therapy. He received a Doctor of Medicine from NKUA in 1981.

== Career ==
=== Medicine ===
Kaklamanis worked at Aretaio Hospital from 1975 to 2008, and was in charge of one of its radiation therapy departments starting in 1983. He was elected Secretary General of the Panhellenic Medical Association in 1987.

=== Parliament ===
Kaklamanis became a member of New Democracy's (ND) central committee in 1986, and its executive committee in 1987.

In the 1990 election Kaklamanis was elected to the Hellenic Parliament from Athens A. He resigned from parliament on 23 May 1994, and was replaced by Efstathios Giotas. He was elected back to the Hellenic Parliament in 2000.

In the May 2012 election Kaklamanis returned to parliament. He was expelled from ND on 31 March 2014, but was brought back into the party on 9 October.

From 2004 to 2006, he was Minister of Health and Social Solidarity. Kaklamanis became Deputy Speaker in parliament in 2015. On 18 July 2019, he was elected First Vice President of parliament and reelected to that position on 29 May 2023.

Konstantinos Tasoulas resigned as President of the Hellenic Parliament after being elected President of Greece by the parliament. On 22 January 2025, 247 members voted to elect Kaklamanis as president of the parliament while 50 voted present. He was supported by members of New Democracy, PASOK, Syriza, Greek Solution, Spartans, and most of the independent MPs while the MPs that voted present came from the Communist Party of Greece, Niki, New Left, and Course of Freedom.

=== European Parliament ===
In the 1994 election Kaklamanis was elected to the European Parliament as a member of Political Spring. During his tenure he served on the Budgets committee and was vice-chair of the Transport and Tourism committee. He was vice-chair of the European Democratic Alliance from 19 July 1994 to 4 July 1995, and vice-chair of Union for Europe from 5 July 1995 to 19 July 1999.

=== Mayoralty ===
On 22 December 2006, Kaklamanis resigned from parliament, being replaced by Maro Kontou, after being elected mayor of Athens in the 2006 election. He lost reelection in 2010. He was president of the Central Union of Municipalities and Communities of Greece from 15 May 2007 to October 2011.

== Personal life ==
Kaklamanis can speak French and English.

== Works cited ==
=== News ===
- "Kaklamanis elected new speaker of Parliament". Kathimerini. 22 January 2025. Archived from the original on 25 June 2025.
- Charlie, Kowalenko (24 January 2025). "Nikitas Kaklamanis Elected Speaker of the Hellenic Parliament with Broad Support". Greek City Times. Archived from the original on 25 June 2025.

=== Web ===
- "Nikitas Kaklamanis". European Parliament. Archived from the original on 25 June 2025.
- "Nikitas Michail Kaklamanis CV". Hellenic Parliament. Archived from the original on 25 June 2025.
- "Term of Office of MPs from 1974 until Today". Hellenic Parliament. Archived from the original on 25 June 2025.

Political offices
Preceded by Kostas Stefanis	Minister for Health and Social Solidarity; 2004–2006	Succeeded by Dimitris Avramopoulos
Preceded by Theodoros Bechrakis	Mayor of Athens; 2007–2010	Succeeded by Giorgos Kaminis
Preceded by Konstantinos Tasoulas	Speaker of the Hellenic Parliament; 2025-present	Incumbent
