= Costas Stefanis =

Greek psychiatrist and Greek Minister of Health and Welfare

Costas Stefanis (1928 – 29 October 2016) was a Greek psychiatrist and Greek Minister of Health and Welfare from 2002 to 2004.

He received his MD from the University of Athens medical school in 1953 and was trained in psychiatry and neurology at the Eginition University Hospital. In 1955, Stefanis collaborated in the first clinical study with chlorpromazine in Greece. From 1960 to 1965, he did post-doctoral research at McGill University of Montreal, Canada.

From 2002 to 2004, he was Minister of Health and Welfare.

He was president of the World Psychiatric Association from 1983 to 1988.
