= Sotirios Zarianopoulos =

Greek politician

Sotirios Zarianopoulos MEP
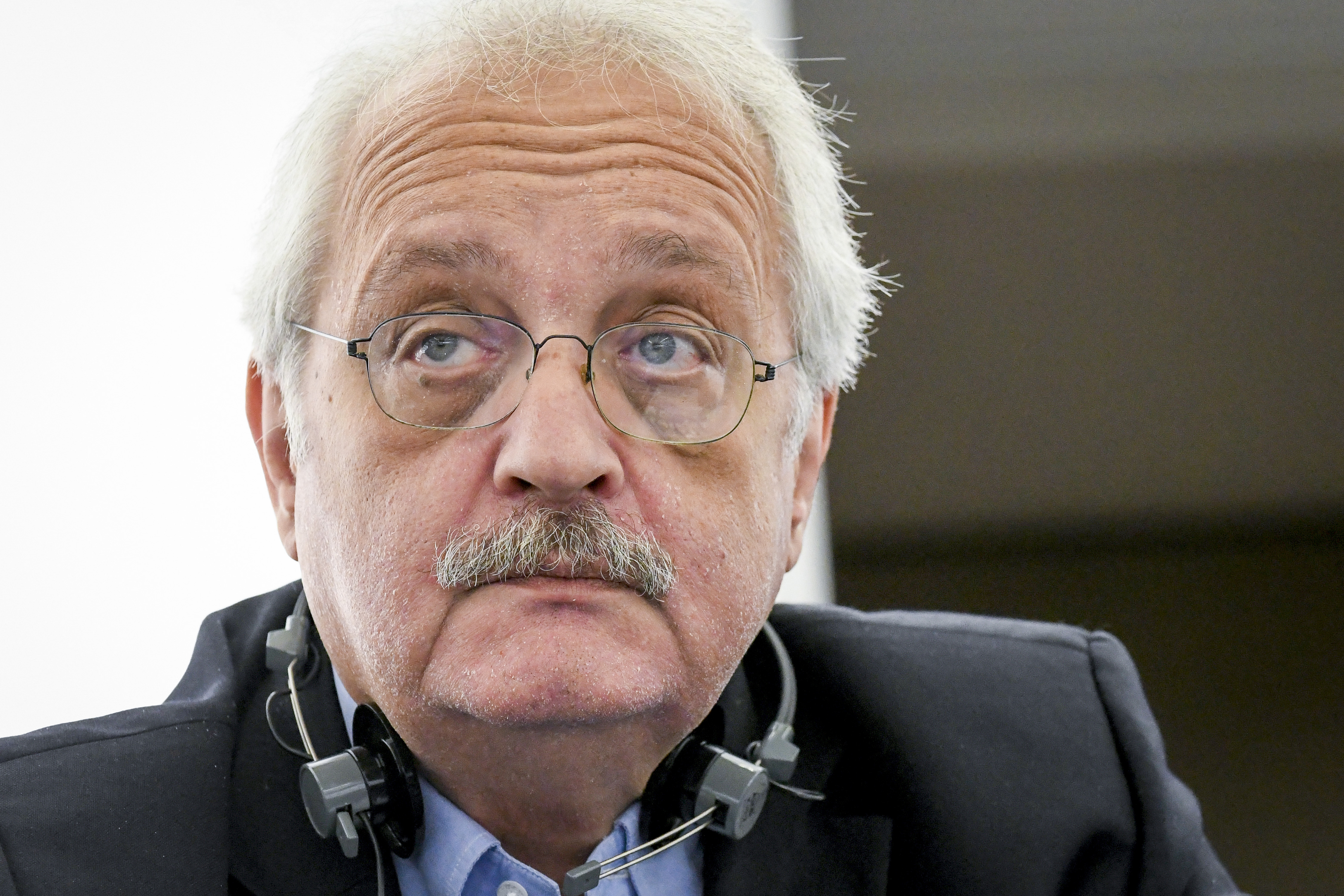

Member of the European Parliament
- In office 1 July 2014 – 2 July 2019 Serving with 20 others
- Constituency: Greece

Personal details
- Born: 16 February 1961 (age 65) Thessaloniki, Greece
- Party: Communist Party of Greece
- Occupation: Politician

Sotirios Zarianopoulos (Greek: Σωτήριος Ζαριανόπουλος; 1961) is a Greek communist politician. He was elected a Member of the European Parliament in the 2014 European elections for the Communist Party of Greece.
