= Ecologist Greens =

Ecologist Greens Οικολόγοι Πράσινοι
- President: Executive Committee (6 Members) of Panhellenic Council (34 Members)
- Founded: 7–8 December 2002
- Headquarters: 128, 28th Oktovriou, 11257 Athens
- Ideology: Green politics
- Political position: Left-wing
- European affiliation: none (European Green Party until 2025)
- International affiliation: Global Greens
- Colours: Light green
- Parliament: 0 / 300
- European Parliament: 0 / 21

Website
- ecogreens.gr

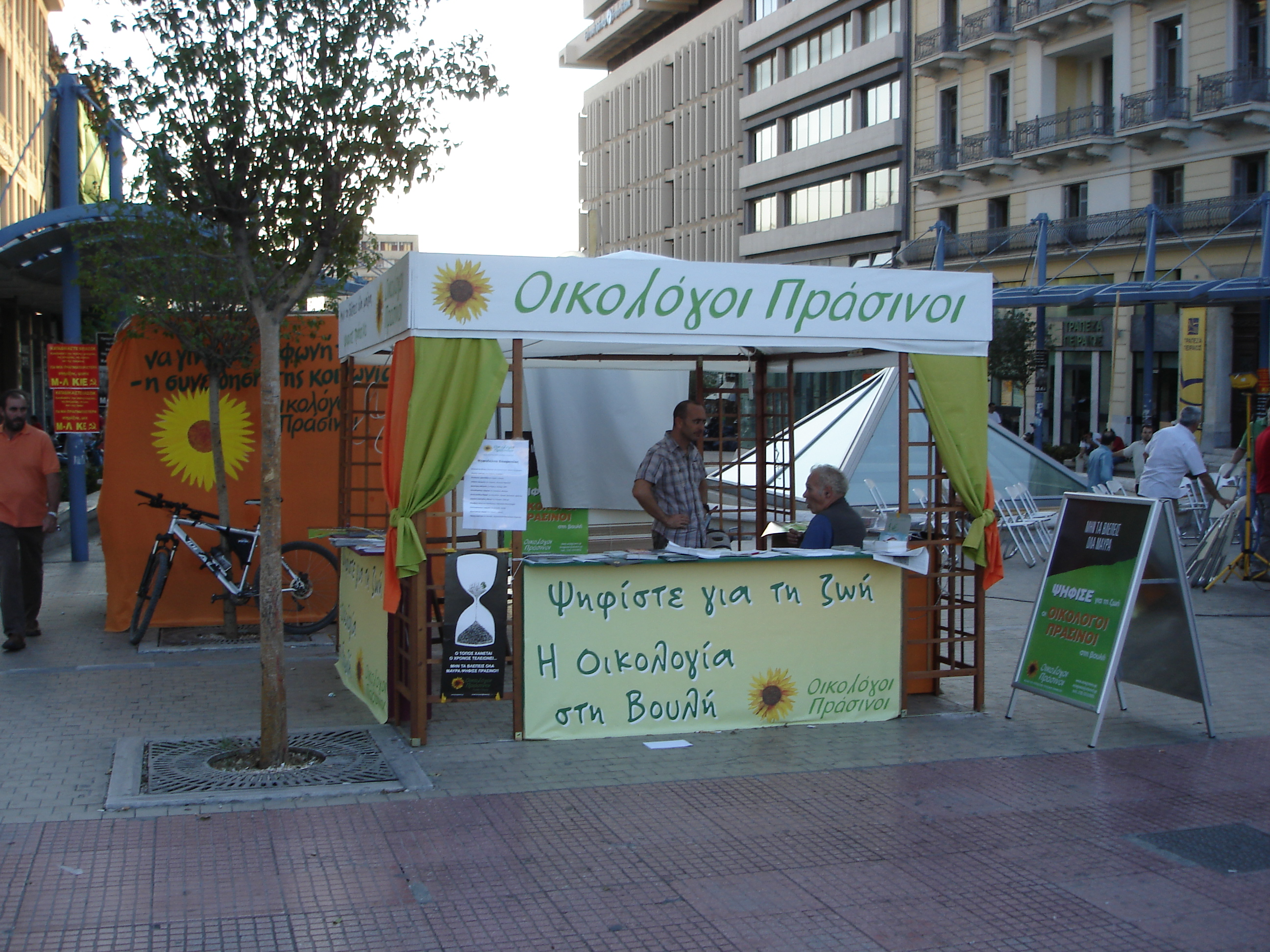
Electoral campaign kiosk of the party for the 2007 legislative election in Athens

Logo of the party until early 2019

The Ecologist Greens (Greek: Οικολόγοι Πράσινοι (ΟΠ), Oikologoi Prasinoi, OP) is a Greek green political party. The party was a member of the European Green Party, but decided to leave the organisation in 2025.

== History ==
The political party Prasini Politiki (Greek: Πράσινη Πολιτική, "Green Politics"), the body that lead to the establishment of the party under the name "Oikologoi Prasinoi", was founded in 1996 and already registered as the Greek member of the European Green Party, including other local ecological groups and independent ecologists, like the Ecological Forum (Οικολογικό Φόρουμ) and the Ecological Movement of Thessaloniki.

During 7–8 December 2002, the "Prasini Politiki" council called for a conference that convened in the building of the Athens Lawyer Association, and it decided to establish the Ecologist Greens and elected an 18-member council to coordinate the establishment of a new political entity. In the coming months, focus groups were created to shape the constitution and the political positions of the body, which were adopted by the first congress of the party in May 2003 at Panteion University.

In January 2015, the Ecologist Greens decided to collaborate with SYRIZA. Alexis Tsipras' called for unity against the Memorandum and the Ecologist Greens decided to support SYRIZA's electoral list for the upcoming legislative election. One Ecologist Green MP was elected on the SYRIZA ticket, Giorgos Dimaras, and another Ecologist Green, Giannis Tsironis, was appointed Alternate Minister of Environment and Energy in the first Tsipras Cabinet.

Giorgos Dimaras was reelected and Giannis Tsironis was elected for the first time. Tsironis was reappointed as Alternate Minister of Environment in the second Tsipras cabinet on 23 September 2015.

== Aims ==
The basic principles of the Ecologists Greens (Oikologoi Prasinoi), as determined by their constitution are: sustainability, social justice, nonviolence, direct and participatory democracy, respect for diversity, decentralization and subsidiarity, protect and restore natural ecosystems, the quality of life, personal and social responsibility, equity and anti-austerity.

== Election results ==
=== Hellenic Parliament ===
Election	Hellenic Parliament					Rank	Government	Leader
Election	Votes	%	±pp	Seats won	+/−	Rank	Government	Leader
2007	75,502	1.05%	New	0 / 300	New	6th	Extra-parliamentary	Collective leadership
2009	173,589	2.53%	+1.48	0 / 300	0	6th	Extra-parliamentary	Collective leadership
May 2012	185,485	2.93%	+0.40	0 / 300	0	8th	Extra-parliamentary	Collective leadership
Jun 2012	54,408	0.88%	–2.05	0 / 300	0	10th	Extra-parliamentary	Collective leadership
Jan 2015 (Note: Run in coalition with SYRIZA.)	2,245,978	36.34%	+35.46	1 / 300	▲1	1st	Coalition government (SYRIZA–ANEL)	Collective leadership
Sep 2015	1,925,904	35.46%	–0.88	2 / 300	▲1	1st	Coalition government (SYRIZA–ANEL)	Collective leadership
2019	Did not contest			0 / 300	▼2	—N/a	Extra-parliamentary	Collective leadership
May 2023	35,174	0.60%	–34.80	0 / 300	0	12th	Extra-parliamentary	Collective leadership
Jun 2023	21,054	0.40%	–0.20	0 / 300	0	12th	Extra-parliamentary	Collective leadership

=== Other elections ===
Results since 2004 (year links to election page)
Year	Type of Election	Votes	%	Mandates
2004	European	40,873	0.67	0
2006	Local (Athens Municipality)	3,822	1.39	0
2006	Local (Prefecture of Thessaloniki)	25,655	4.6	2
2009	European	178,964	3.49	1
2010	Local (peripheries)		2.9	11/725
2014	Local (peripheries)			26/703
2014	European	51,673	0.90	0
2019	European	49,418	0.87	0
2019	Local	44,078	0.81	4/704

== Affiliations ==
- European Green Party
