= Michalis Tremopoulos =

Greek lawyer, journalist, environmentalist and politician

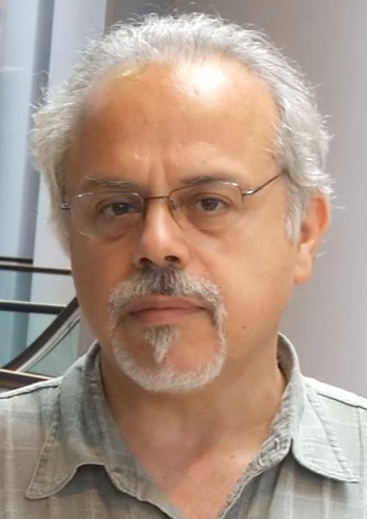
Michalis Tremopoulos

Michalis Tremopoulos (Greek: Μιχάλης Τρεμόπουλος; born 3 March 1958, in Serres) is a Greek lawyer, journalist, environmentalist and politician. He was a Member of European Parliament (MEP) from 2009 until Feb 2012.

He graduated in law from the Aristotle University of Thessaloniki in 1991, and in social ecology at the Goddard College in Vermont in 1993. He worked as a TV, radio and newspaper journalist.

He is a founding member of Ecologists Greens party. He won a seat in the European Parliament in the 2009 EP elections.
