= Cornelius Castoriadis =

Greek-French philosopher (1922–1997)

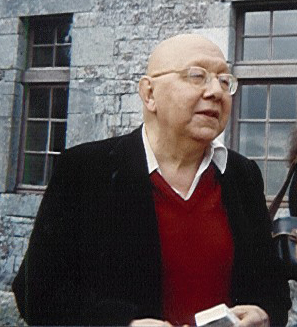
- Castoriadis in 1990
- Born: Kornilios Kastoriadis; 11 March 1922; Constantinople, Ottoman Empire (present-day Istanbul, Turkey)
- Died: 26 December 1997 (aged 75); Paris, France
- Citizenship: French (from 1970)
- Occupations: Philosopher, sociologist, social critic, economist, psychoanalyst, activist, editor
- Political party: See list: OKNE (1937–1941); KKE (1941–1942); KDKE (Note: KDKE was previously known as "Occupation-era KDKE" (1942), "DKKE" (1943), and "DEKE" (1944). It was renamed "KDKE" in 1946 and dissolved in 1967.) (1942–1948); PCI – Chaulieu–Montal Tendency (1946–1948); Socialisme ou Barbarie (1949–1966)
- Spouses: Catherine May (m. 1960; div. 1963) Piera Aulagnier (m. 1968; div. 1978) Zoé Christofidi (m. 1978)
- Children: 2

Education
- Education: 8th Gymnasium of Athens (Apol., 1937); University of Athens (B.A., 1942); University of Paris (Dr. cand., 1946–1948); University of Paris X (DrE, 1980)
- Doctoral advisor: Paul Ricœur
- Other advisor: René Poirier

Philosophical work
- Era: 20th-century philosophy
- Region: Western philosophy
- School: Continental philosophy; Revolutionary socialism; Western Marxism/post-Marxism (early); Libertarian socialism (later); Other schools: Post-phenomenology; Post-Lacanianism; Civic republicanism; Philosophy of praxis
- Institutions: EHESS (1979–1995)
- Doctoral students: Alice Pechriggl
- Notable students: Yorgos Oikonomou
- Main interests: Political philosophy; democratic theory; psychoanalysis; economics; Sovietology; sociology; social philosophy; social criticism; ecology; philosophy of science; philosophy of history; ontology; epistemology; aesthetics
- Notable ideas: See list: The project of autonomy, the radical imaginary underlying social institutions, radical imagination, the social imaginary, social imaginary significations, proto-representation (Ur-Vorstellung), the monadic core of the psyche, "the unconscious exists only as an indissociably representative/affective/intentional flux", rejecting the reduction of representation to perception (perceptual nonconceptualism), "the first delegation of the drive in the psyche is the affect", the psyche and the anonymous collective as irreducible to each other, sublimation as the process by means of which the psyche is forced to replace its private objects of cathexis with objects that have value through their social institution, triadic schema (the subject, the object and the other), social fabrication of the individual, social constructionism, lability of investments (labilité des investissements), identifying representational activity as prior to reflection, being-for-itself as creative of its own proper world, physis as being-towards (à-être) idiogenesis/koinogenesis, the world as a product of Chaos, the identitary-ensemblist logic (logique ensembliste-identitaire) vs. the logic of (ontological) magmas, (Note: From the contemporary geological term magma, "blend of molten or semi-molten rock", from the Ancient Greek μάγμα, "thick unguent" (Suzi Adams, ed., 2014, ch. 6).) criticism of the philosophical determinacy found in inherited Western philosophical thought, the Cantorian definition of set implying the schema of separation, proto-institutions of legein and teukhein, (Note: From the Ancient Greek λέγειν "to say, speak" and τεύχειν "to make.") Wo Ich bin, soll Es auftauchen ("Where Ego is, Id must spring forth"), conflict of desires, the social-historical, the methodology of elucidation (élucidation), circle of creation, the paradox of history, society's leaning on the first natural stratum (the biological and pre-symbolic aspects of human existence), "creation is ex nihilo [from nothing], but it is neither in nihilo [in nothing] nor cum nihilo [with nothing]", vis formandi, radical alterity (altérité radicale), time as creation/destruction of forms, societas instituans / societas instituta, (Note: Translated as "instituting society" and "instituted society") abolition of the wage system, administration of justice by popular tribunals, plan factory, criticism of orthodox Marxism, the antinomy of Marxism (the Marxist deterministic schema as precluding the possibility of the creative mass action of the proletariat), criticism of Marxist economic determinism and historical materialism, replacement of the classical dichotomy between owners and workers with the dichotomy between directors (order-givers) and executants (order-takers), representative democracies functioning as "liberal oligarchies", democratic planning, criticism of Soviet bureaucracy, fragmented bureaucratic capitalism vs. totalitarian bureaucratic capitalism, (Note: In contemporary terminology, this would be framed as "Western corporate, private capitalism vs. Soviet state capitalism"—though Castoriadis rejected the term "state capitalism".) the "final contradiction" of capitalism, relatively autonomous evolution of technique, the capitalist imaginary of unlimited expansion of rational mastery, the nomos–physis distinction, three spheres of social action (oikos, the private/private or domestic sphere; agora, the public/private or implicitly political sphere; ekklesia, the public/public or explicitly political sphere), ecological self-limitation (degrowth), Gödelian argument, heteronomy of insignificance (the loss of meaning and direction in society), the Greco-Occidental particularity, democracy as procedure (formalist) vs. democracy as regime (substantivist), criticism of French structuralism (as a form of logicism) and structural functionalism (as a form of physicalism), criticism of Hegelian dialectic and materialist dialectic, criticism of Marxian economics, capital as power, criticism of Marx's theory of history, criticism of Lacanianism, criticism of the poststructuralist theory of the subject, criticism of philosophical universalism, criticism of the New Philosophers

Cornelius Castoriadis (Note: /ˌkɑːstəriˈɑːdɪs/; French: [kɔʁneljys kastɔʁjadis]) (Greek: Κορνήλιος Καστοριάδης; (Note: Greek: [korˈnilios kastoriˈaðis]) (Note: Latinized spelling: Kornilios Kastoriadis) 11 March 1922 – 26 December 1997) was a Greek-French philosopher, sociologist, social critic, economist, psychoanalyst, author of The Imaginary Institution of Society, and co-founder of the Socialisme ou Barbarie collective.

His writings on autonomy and social institutions have been influential in both academic and activist circles.

== Biography ==
=== Early life in Athens ===
Cornelius (Note: He was named after Saint Cornelius the Centurion.) Castoriadis was born on 11 March 1922 in Constantinople (then part of the Ottoman Empire), the son of fabric merchant Kaisar and Sophia Kastoriadis, née Papachela (Παπαχελά). His family had to move in July 1922 to Athens, the home of Castoriadis' mother, due to the Greco-Turkish War (1919–22). Castoriadis developed an interest in politics after he came into contact with Marxist thought at the age of 13. At the same time, he began studying traditional philosophy after purchasing a copy of the book History of Philosophy (Ιστορία της Φιλοσοφίας, Istoria tis Filosofias, 2 vols., 1933) by historian of ideas Nikolaos Louvaris.

Sometime between 1932 and 1935, Maximiani Portas (later known as "Savitri Devi"), a doctoral candidate in philosophy at the University of Lyon, was Castoriadis' French tutor. During the same period, he attended the 8th Gymnasium of Athens in Kato Patisia, from which he graduated in 1937 at age 15.

His first active involvement in politics occurred during the Metaxas Regime in 1937, when he joined the Athens Communist Youth (Κομμουνιστική Νεολαία Αθήνας, Kommounistiki Neolaia Athinas), a section of the Young Communist League of Greece (OKNE). In 1938, Castoriadis and fellow student Andreas Papandreou were arrested for leftist affiliations. (Note: Andreas Papandreou was accused of printing the newspaper Proletarios (Προλετάριος) for the Trotskyist group EOKDE, while Castoriadis was accused of being a recipient of the newspaper.) In 1941, Castoriadis joined the Communist Party of Greece (KKE), only to leave one year later in order to become an active Trotskyist—at the time, he was under the influence of the Archeio-Marxist/Trotskyist revolutionary militant Agis Stinas who was the founder of KDKE, a party that rejected the Communist-led National Liberation Front and promoted revolutionary defeatism. The latter action resulted in his persecution by both the Germans and the Communist Party (through its secret police, OPLA).

In 1937, he also enrolled in the School of Law, Economics and Political Sciences of the University of Athens (where, at the University Club, he met and collaborated with the "Heidelberg Circle", namely the Heidelberg School neo-Kantian intellectuals Konstantinos Despotopoulos, Panagiotis Kanellopoulos, Konstantinos Tsatsos), (Note: Their informal group was called Idealistic Philosophical Group (Ιδεοκρατική Φιλοσοφική Ομάδα). Odysseas Elytis and Andreas Papandreou were also members of the same group during their university years.) from which he graduated in 1942.

In early 1944, he wrote his first essays on social science and Max Weber, which he published in the journal Archive of Sociology and Ethics (Αρχείον Κοινωνιολογίας και Ηθικής, Archeion Koinoniologias kai Ithikis; published by the Greek Association for Sociological Studies – Εταιρεία Κοινωνιολογικών Σπουδών). The journal was initially headed by the sociologist Avrotelis Eleftheropoulos, but later by Castoriadis and his fellow law students Dimitrios Tsakonas and Mimika Kranaki.

Castoriadis heavily criticized the actions of the KKE during the December 1944 clashes (the prelude to the 1946–49 Greek Civil War) between the communist-led ELAS on one side, and the Georgios Papandreou government aided by British troops on the other.

In December 1945, he boarded the RMS Mataroa, a New Zealand ocean liner, to go to Paris (where he remained permanently) to continue his studies under a scholarship offered by the French Institute of Athens. The same voyage—organized by Octave Merlier—also brought from Greece to France a number of other Greek writers, artists and intellectuals (the "Mataroa Generation"), including Constantine Andreou, Kostas Axelos, Georges Candilis, Costa Coulentianos, Mimika Kranaki, Emmanuel Kriaras, Adonis A. Kyrou, Kostas Papaïoannou, Miltiadès Papamiltiadès, Virgile Solomonidis, and Nikos Svoronos.

In France, he was known to intimates as "Corneille".

=== Paris and the Chaulieu–Montal Tendency ===
Once in Paris, Castoriadis joined the Trotskyist Parti Communiste Internationaliste (PCI). He and Claude Lefort (a student of Maurice Merleau-Ponty) constituted a Chaulieu–Montal Tendency (so called after their pseudonyms) in the French PCI in 1946. In April 1948, Castoriadis participated in the Second World Congress of the Fourth International in Paris under his pseudonym Pierre Chaulieu, representing the opposition.

In August 1946, Castoriadis published his article "On the Regime and Against the Defense of the USSR", which addressed the "Russian question"—that is, the nature of Stalinist Russia—rejecting the Trotskyist characterization of the Soviet Union as a degenerated workers' state. Castoriadis acknowledged that the October Revolution had degenerated, but this alone does not explain the structure of the new type of regime.

In the autumn of 1948, following disagreements over the PCI's support for Josip Broz Tito, Castoriadis and Lefort became definitively disillusioned with Trotskyism and its Leninist foundations. This led them to break away and establish the libertarian socialist and council communist group and journal Socialisme ou Barbarie (S. ou B., 1949–1966), which included Jean-François Lyotard and Guy Debord as members for a while, and profoundly influenced the French intellectual left. Castoriadis had links with the group known as the Johnson–Forest Tendency (a Trotskyist tendency in the United States associated with Marxist humanist theorists C. L. R. James, Raya Dunayevskaya, and Grace Lee Boggs) until 1958. Strongly influenced by Castoriadis and Socialisme ou Barbarie was the British group Solidarity, led by Maurice Brinton.

=== Early philosophical research ===
In 1946, Castoriadis started attending philosophical and sociological courses at the Faculty of Humanities at the University of Paris, where among his teachers were Gaston Bachelard, the epistemologist René Poirier, the historian of philosophy Henri Bréhier, (Note: Not to be confused with Émile Bréhier) Henri Gouhier, Jean Wahl, Gustave Guillaume, Albert Bayet, and Georges Davy. He submitted a proposal for a doctoral dissertation on mathematical logic to Poirier, but by 1948 he had abandoned the project. The working title of his unfinished thesis was Introduction à la logique axiomatique (Introduction to Axiomatic Logic), with a complementary unfinished thesis: Introduction à la théorie des sciences sociales (Introduction to the Theory of the Social Science).

=== Career as an economist ===
At the same time (starting in November 1948), he worked as an economist at the Organisation for European Economic Co-operation / Organisation for Economic Co-operation and Development (OEEC/OECD) until 1970, which was also the year when he obtained French citizenship. His last position at the OECD was Director of Statistics, National Accounts, and Growth Studies.

=== Political theorist ===
In his 1949 essay "The Relations of Production in Russia", Castoriadis developed a critique of the supposed socialist character of the government of the Soviet Union. According to Castoriadis, the central claim of the Stalinist regime at the time was that the mode of production in Russia was socialist, but the mode of distribution was not yet a socialist one since the socialist edification in the country had not yet been completed. However, according to Castoriadis' analysis, since the mode of distribution of the social product is inseparable from the mode of production, the claim that one can have control over distribution while not having control over production is meaningless.

Castoriadis was particularly influential in the turn of the intellectual left during the 1950s against the Soviet Union, because he argued that the Soviet Union was not a communist but rather a bureaucratic capitalist state, which contrasted with Western powers mostly by virtue of its centralized power apparatus. His work in the OECD substantially helped his analyses. Castoriadis regarded the Hungarian Revolution of 1956 as the first genuine uprising against bureaucratic regimes.

His reflections on organization within a militant framework led him to confront the irreducible element of creation that cannot be described or anticipated in advance. The most explicit articulation of these ideas appears in his article "Proletarian Leadership" (1952), where he argues that Marxist revolutionary practice is marked by a profound contradiction: on the one hand, it depends on a scientific understanding of social structures; on the other, its very possibility hinges on the inventive and transformative actions of countless individuals.

To prevent visa complications, his pre-1970 political writings were published under a pseudonym, as "Pierre Chaulieu" (early S. ou B. writings, 1949–1958) "Paul Cardan" (later S. ou B. writings, 1959–1965) or "Jean-Marc Coudray" (Fayard, 1968).

Later, Castoriadis reissued most of his Socialisme ou Barbarie texts in ten volumes through the 10/18 publishing house between 1973 and 1979.

==== Distancing from Marxism ====
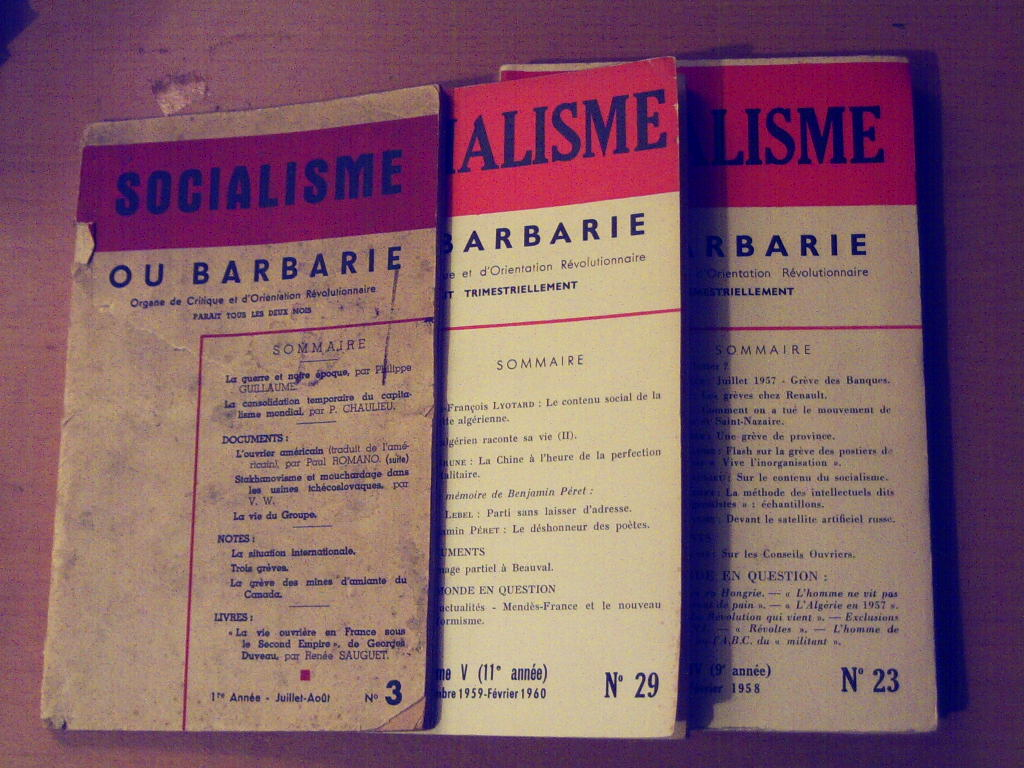
The journal Socialisme ou Barbarie

In the latter years of Socialisme ou Barbarie, Castoriadis came to reject the Marxist theories of economics and of history (Karl Marx's historical materialism), especially in an essay on "Modern Capitalism and Revolution", first published in Socialisme ou Barbarie in 1960–61 (first English translation in 1963 by Solidarity). Castoriadis' final Socialisme ou Barbarie essay was "Marxism and Revolutionary Theory", published in April 1964 – June 1965. (Note: The essay "Marxism and Revolutionary Theory" was republished in 1975 as Part I of his book The Imaginary Institution of Society (the second part being "The Social Imaginary and the Institution", a previously unpublished follow-up to "Marxism and Revolutionary Theory").) There he concluded that a revolutionary Marxist must choose either to remain Marxist or to remain revolutionary.

=== Psychoanalyst ===
When Jacques Lacan's disputes with the International Psychoanalytical Association led to a split and the formation of the École Freudienne de Paris (EFP) in 1964, Castoriadis became a member (as a non-practitioner).

In 1968, Castoriadis married his second spouse, Piera Aulagnier, a French psychoanalyst who had undergone psychoanalytic treatment under Lacan from 1955 until 1961.

In 1969, Castoriadis and Aulagnier split from the EFP to join the Organisation psychanalytique de langue française (OPLF), the so-called "Quatrième Groupe" (Fourth Group), (Note: It was called the Fourth Group because it was the fourth major psychoanalytic group to emerge in France, following SPP (founded 1926), EFP (1964–1980; originally known as SFP, 1953–1963), and APF (founded 1964).) a psychoanalytic group that claims to follow principles and methods that have opened up a third way between Lacanianism and the standards of the International Psychoanalytical Association.

Castoriadis began to practice analysis in 1973 after he had undergone analysis in the 1960s, first with Irène Roubleff (EFP) and then later with Michel Renard (SFP). Between 1974 and 1976, he worked with chronically psychotic patients at the Maison Blanche Psychiatric Hospital.

Although his psychoanalytic thought developed within a Lacanian milieu, it adopted a critical stance from the outset.

=== Philosopher of history and ontologist ===
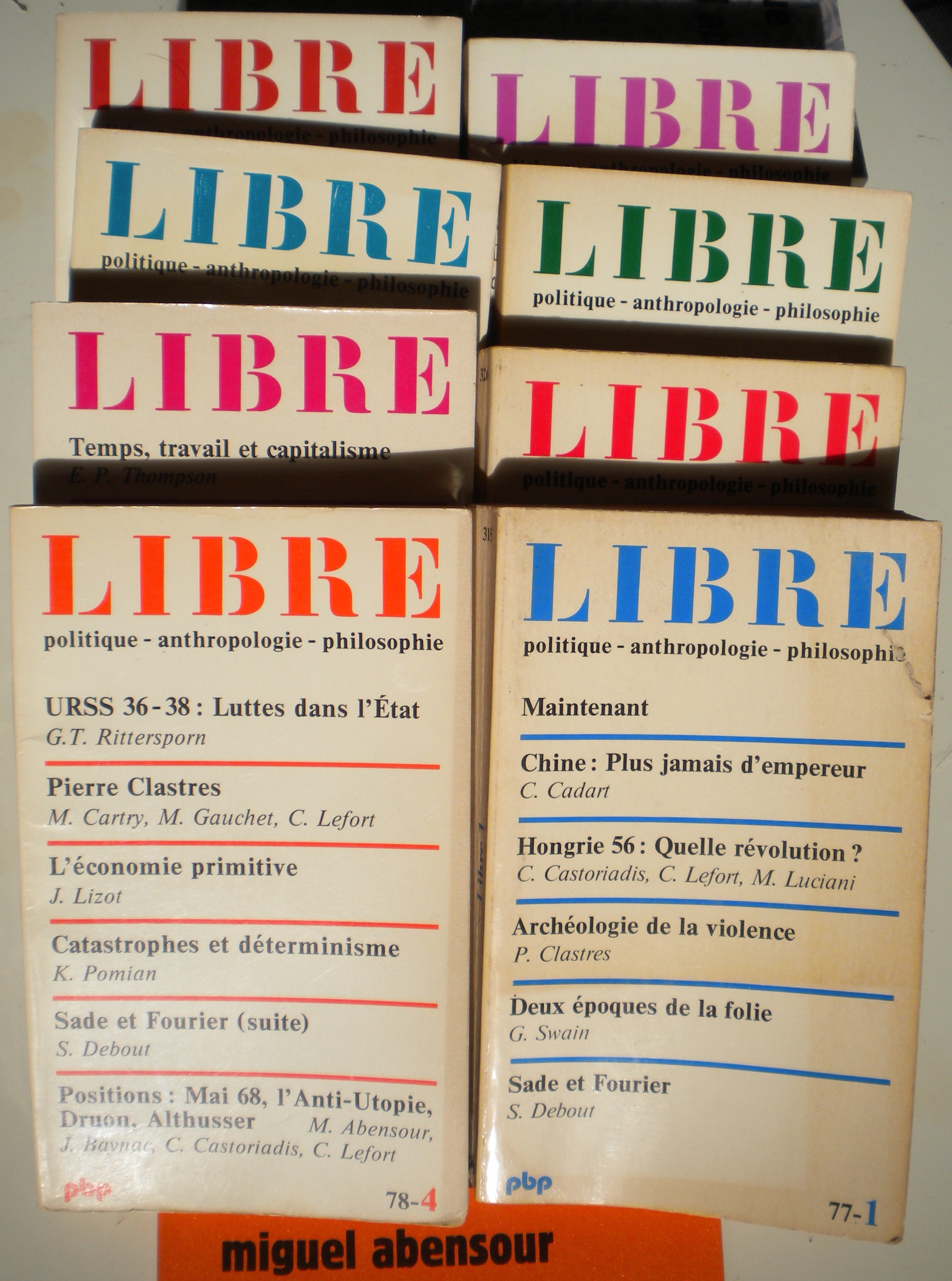
The journal Libre

In 1967, Castoriadis submitted a proposal for a doctoral dissertation on the philosophy of history to Paul Ricœur (then at the University of Paris X: Nanterre). An epistolary dialogue began between them, but Ricœur's obligations to the University of Chicago in the 1970s were such that their collaboration was not feasible at the time. His thesis would be provisionally titled Le fondement imaginaire du social-historique (The Imaginary Foundations of the Social-Historical).

After the events of May 68, Castoriadis dedicated most of his time until 1971 to the study of the philosophy of language, while from 1971 to 1975 he worked as editor of the philosophy journal Textures and, later, took over as editor of the political journal Libre (launched in 1977) until 1980.

In his 1975 work L'Institution imaginaire de la société (The Imaginary Institution of Society) and in Les carrefours du labyrinthe (Crossroads in the Labyrinth), published in 1978, Castoriadis began to develop his distinctive understanding of historical change as the emergence of irrecoverable otherness that must always be socially instituted and named in order to be recognized. Otherness emerges in part from the activity of the psyche itself. Creating external social institutions that give stable form to what Castoriadis terms the (ontological) "magma of social significations" allows the psyche to create stable figures for the self, and to ignore the constant emergence of mental indeterminacy and alterity.

For Castoriadis, self-examination could draw upon the resources of modern psychoanalysis. Autonomous individuals—the essence of an autonomous society—must continuously examine themselves and engage in critical reflection. He writes:

... psychoanalysis can and should make a basic contribution to a politics of autonomy. For each person's self-understanding is a necessary condition for autonomy. One cannot have an autonomous society that would fail to turn back upon itself, that would not interrogate itself about its motives, its reasons for acting, its deep-seated [profondes] tendencies. Considered in concrete terms, however, society doesn't exist outside the individuals making it up. The self-reflective activity of an autonomous society depends essentially upon the self-reflective activity of the humans who form that society.

Castoriadis was not calling for every individual to undergo psychoanalysis per se. Rather, by reforming education and political systems, individuals would be increasingly capable of critical self- and social reflection. He offers: "if psychoanalytic practice has a political meaning, it is solely to the extent that it tries, as far as it possibly can, to render the individual autonomous, that is to say, lucid concerning her desire and concerning reality, and responsible for her acts: holding herself accountable for what she does."

=== Sovietologist ===
In his 1980 essay "Facing the War" (later expanded into a 1981 book), he took the view that Russia had become the world's primary military power. To sustain this, in the context of the visible economic inferiority of the Soviet Union in the civilian sector, he proposed that the society may no longer be dominated by the one-party state bureaucracy but by a "stratocracy"—a separate and dominant military sector with expansionist designs on the world. He further argued that this meant there was no internal class dynamic that could lead to a social revolution within Russian society and that change could only occur through foreign intervention.

=== Later life ===
In 1978, Castoriadis and Aulagnier separated.

In 1980, Castoriadis joined the faculty of the École des Hautes Études en Sciences Sociales (EHESS) as Directeur d'études (Director of Studies, namely full professor). He had been elected Directeur de recherche (Director of Research, namely senior researcher) at the EHESS on 15 December 1979 after submitting his previously published material in conjunction with a defense of his intellectual project of connecting the disciplines of history, sociology and economy through the concept of the social imaginary. His teaching career at the EHESS lasted sixteen years, ending in 1995.

In 1980, he was also awarded his State doctorate from the University of Paris X: Nanterre; the final title of his thesis under Paul Ricœur was L'Élément imaginaire de l'histoire (The Imaginary Element in History).

A symposium dedicated to Castoriadis' work was held in Porto Alegre, Brazil, in September 1981, with his participation.

In 1989, he was awarded an honorary doctorate in Social Sciences by Panteion University and in 1993 another one in Education Sciences by the Democritus University of Thrace.

In 1992, he joined the libertarian socialist journal Society and Nature (established by Takis Fotopoulos) as a writer; the magazine also featured such writers as Murray Bookchin and Noam Chomsky.

He died on 26 December 1997 in Paris from complications following heart surgery. He was survived by Zoé Christofidi (his wife at the time of his death, whom he had married in 1978), his daughter Sparta (born in 1947 from an earlier relationship between Castoriadis and Jeanine "Rilka" Walter, also known as "Comrade Victorine" in the Fourth International), and Cybèle/Kyveli (born in 1980), his younger daughter from his marriage to Zoé.

Castoriadis is buried in Montparnasse Cemetery.

== Philosophy ==
Edgar Morin proposed that Castoriadis' work will be remembered for its remarkable continuity and coherence as well as for its extraordinary breadth which was "encyclopaedic" in the original Greek sense, for it offered a paideia, or education, that brought full circle the cycle of otherwise compartmentalized knowledge in the arts and sciences. Castoriadis wrote essays on mathematics, physics, biology, anthropology, psychoanalysis, linguistics, society, economics, politics, philosophy, and art.

One of Castoriadis' many important contributions to social theory was the idea that social change involves radical discontinuities that cannot be understood in terms of any determinate causes or presented as a sequence of events. Change emerges through the social imaginary without strict determinations, but to be socially recognized, it must be instituted as a revolution. Any knowledge of society and social change can exist only by referring to (or by positing) social imaginary significations. Thus, Castoriadis developed a conceptual framework where the sociological and philosophical category of the social imaginary has a central place and he offered an interpretation of modernity centered on the principal categories of social institutions and social imaginary significations; in his analysis, these categories are the product of the human faculties of the radical imagination and the social imaginary, the latter faculty being the collective dimension of the former. (According to Castoriadis, the sociological and philosophical category of the radical imaginary can be manifested only through the individual radical imagination and the social imaginary.) However, the social imaginary cannot be reduced or attributed to subjective imagination, since the individual is informed through an internalization of social significations.

He used traditional terms as much as possible, though consistently redefining them. Further, some of his terminology changed throughout the later part of his career, with the terms gaining greater consistency but breaking from their traditional meaning (thus creating neologisms). When reading Castoriadis, it is helpful to understand what he means by the terms he uses, since he does not redefine the terms in every piece where he employs them.

=== Autonomy and heteronomy ===
The concept of autonomy was central to his early writings, and he continued to elaborate on its meaning, applications, and limits until his death, gaining him the title of "philosopher of autonomy." The word itself is Greek, where auto- means "for/by itself" and nomos means "law." It refers to the condition of "self-institution" by which one creates their own laws, whether as an individual or as a whole society. And while every society creates its own institutions, only the members of autonomous societies are fully aware of the fact and consider themselves to be the ultimate source of justice. In contrast, members of "heteronomous societies" (hetero-, "other") delegate this process to an authority outside of society, often attributing the source of their traditions to divine origins or, in modern times, to "historical necessity." Castoriadis then identified the need of societies not only to create but to legitimize their laws, to explain, in other words, why their laws are just. Most traditional societies did that through religion, claiming their laws were given by God or a mythical ancestor and therefore must be true.

An exception to this rule is to be found in Ancient Greece, where the constellation of city-states (poleis) that spread throughout the eastern Mediterranean, although not all democratic, showed strong signs of autonomy, and during its peak, classical Athens became fully aware of the fact as seen in Pericles' Funeral Oration, where Pericles praises the Athenian way of life—valuing freedom over mere peace and quiet. Castoriadis considered Ancient Greece, a topic that increasingly drew his attention, not as a blueprint to be copied but an experiment that could inspire a truly autonomous community—one that could legitimize its laws without assigning their source to a higher authority. The Greeks differed from other societies because they not only started as autonomous but maintained this ideal by challenging their laws on a constant basis while obeying them to the same degree (even to the extent of enforcing capital punishment), proving that autonomous societies can indeed exist.

Regarding modern societies, Castoriadis notes that while religions have lost part of their normative function, their nature is still heteronomous, only that this time it has rational pretenses. Capitalism legitimizes itself through "reason", claiming that it makes "rational sense", but Castoriadis observed that all such efforts are ultimately tautological, in that they can only legitimize a system through the rules defined by the system itself. So just like the Old Testament claimed that "There is only one God, God", capitalism defines logic as the maximization of utility and minimization of costs, and then legitimizes itself based on its effectiveness to meet these criteria. Surprisingly, this definition of logic is also shared by Communism, which, despite the fact that it stands in seeming opposition, is the product of the same imaginary, and uses the same concepts and categories to describe the world, principally in material terms and through the process of human labor.

==== The project of autonomy ====
Castoriadis views the political organization of the Ancient Greek cities (poleis) not as a model to imitate, but rather as a source of inspiration towards an autonomous society. He also rejects the term "city-state" used to describe Ancient Greek cities; for him, the administration of Greek poleis was not that of a State in the modern sense of the term, since Greek poleis were self-administered. The same goes for colonization since the neighboring Phoenicians, who had a similar expansion in the Mediterranean, were monarchical till their end. During this time of colonization, however, around the time of Homer's epic poems, the Greeks, instead of transferring their mother city's social system to the newly established colony, for the first time in known history, legislated anew from the ground up. What also made the Greeks special was the fact that, following the above, they kept this system as a perpetual autonomy, which led to direct democracy.

This phenomenon of autonomy is again present in the emergence of the states of northern Italy during the Renaissance, as a product of small independent merchants.

He sees a tension in the modern West between, on the one hand, the project of autonomy and the potential for creativity and, on the other hand, the spirit-crushing force of capitalism. These are respectively characterized as the creative imaginary and the capitalist imaginary:

I think that we are at a crossing in the roads of history, history in the grand sense. One road already appears clearly laid out, at least in its general orientation. That's the road of the loss of meaning, of the repetition of empty forms, of conformism, apathy, irresponsibility, and cynicism at the same time as it is that of the tightening grip of the capitalist imaginary of unlimited expansion of "rational mastery", pseudorational pseudomastery, of an unlimited expansion of consumption for the sake of consumption, that is to say, for nothing, and of a technoscience that has become autonomized along its path and that is evidently involved in the domination of this capitalist imaginary.
The other road should be opened: it is not at all laid out. It can be opened only through a social and political awakening, a resurgence of the project of individual and collective autonomy, that is to say, of the will to freedom. This would require an awakening of the imagination and of the creative imaginary.

He argues that, in the last two centuries, ideas about autonomy again come to the fore: "This extraordinary profusion reaches a sort of pinnacle during the two centuries stretching between 1750 and 1950. This is a very specific period because of the very great density of cultural creation, but also because of its very strong subversiveness."

=== The imaginary ===
In the context of being a specific term in psychoanalysis, "imaginary" originates in the writings of the French psychoanalyst Jacques Lacan (as elaborated in his concept of "the Imaginary") and is strongly associated with Castoriadis' work. Castoriadis believed that for a given society, as people penetrate the layers of its culture deeper and deeper, they arrive at meanings that do not mean something other than themselves. They are, so to speak, "final meanings" that the society in question has imposed on the world, on itself. Because these meanings (manifestations of the "radical imaginary" in Castoriadian terminology) do not point to anything concrete, and because the logical categories needed to analyze them are derived from them, these meanings cannot be analysed rationally. They are arational (rather than irrational), and must therefore be acknowledged rather than comprehended in the common use of the term. Castoriadis' view on concept-formation is in sharp contrast to that of postmodernists like Jacques Derrida, who explicitly denies the existence of concepts "in and of themselves".

The radical imaginary is at the basis of cultures and accounts for their differences. In his seminal work The Imaginary Institution of Society (especially in Part II: "The Social Imaginary and the Institution"), Castoriadis argues that societies are founded not as products of historical necessity, but as the result of a new and radical idea of the world, an idea that appears to spring fully formed and is practically irreducible. All cultural forms (laws and institutions, aesthetics and ritual) follow from this radical imaginary, and are not to be explained merely as products of material conditions. Castoriadis then is offering an "ontogenetic" or "emergentist" model of history, one that is apparently unpopular amongst modern historians, but can serve as a valuable critique of historical materialism. For example, Castoriadis believed that Ancient Greeks had an imaginary by which the world stems from Chaos, while in contrast, the Hebrews had an imaginary by which the world stems from the will of a rational entity, God or Yahweh in the Hebrew Bible. The former developed therefore a system of direct democracy where the laws were ever-changing according to the people's will while the second was a theocratic system according to which man is in an eternal quest to understand and enforce the will of God.

Traditional societies had elaborate imaginaries, expressed through various creation myths, by which they explained how the world came to be and how it is sustained. Capitalism did away with this mythic imaginary by replacing it with what it claims to be pure reason. That same imaginary is the foundation of its opposing ideology, Communism. By that measure he observes (first in his main criticism of Marxism, titled the Imaginary Institution of Society, and subsequently in a speech he gave at the Université catholique de Louvain on 27 February 1980) that these two systems are more closely related than was previously thought, since they share the same Industrial Revolution type imaginary: that of a rational society where man's welfare is materially measurable and infinitely improvable through the expansion of industries and advancements in science. In this respect Marx failed to understand that technology is not, as he claimed, the main drive of social change, since there are historical examples where societies possessing near-identical technologies formed very different relations to them. An example given in the book is France and England during the Industrial Revolution, with the second being much more liberal than the first. Similarly, in the issue of ecology, he observes that the problems facing the environment exist only within the capitalist imaginary that values the continuous expansion of industries. Trying to solve it by changing or managing these industries better might fail, since it essentially acknowledges this imaginary as real, thus perpetuating the problem.

Castoriadis also believed that the complex historical processes through which new imaginaries are born are not directly quantifiable by science. This is because it is through the imaginaries themselves that the categories upon which science is applied are created. In the second part of his Imaginary Institution of Society (titled "The Social Imaginary and the Institution"), he gives the example of set theory, which is at the basis of formal logic, which cannot function without having first defined the "elements" which are to be assigned to sets. This initial schema of separation (French: schéma de séparation) of the world into distinct elements and categories, therefore, precedes the application of (formal) logic and, consequently, science.

==== Chaos ====
The concept of Chaos, as found in Ancient Greek cosmogony, plays a significant role in Castoriadis' work, and is connected to the idea of the "imaginary". Castoriadis translates the Greek word "chaos" as nothingness. According to him, the core of the Greek imaginary was a world that came from Chaos rather than the will of God as described in Genesis. Castoriadis concludes that the Greek imaginary of a "world out of Chaos" was what allowed them to create institutions such as democracy, because—if the world is created out of nothing—man can model it as he sees fit, without trying to conform to some divine law. He contrasted the Greek imaginary to the Biblical imaginary (found in Genesis) in which God shapes the chaos that already exists.

==== Social constructionism ====
Castoriadis was a social constructionist and a meta-ethical moral relativist (but not a cultural relativist) insofar as he held that the radical imaginary of each society was opaque to rational analysis. He believed that social norms and morals ultimately derive from a society's unique idea of the world, which emerges fully formed at a given moment in history and cannot be reduced further. From this, he concluded that any criteria by which one could evaluate these morals objectively are also derived from the said imaginary, rendering this evaluation subjective. This does not mean that Castoriadis stopped believing in the value of social struggles for a better world; he simply thought that rationally proving their value is impossible.

This, however, does not mean that Castoriadis believed there is no truth, but that truth is linked to the imaginary which is ultimately arational. In his book World in Fragments, which includes essays on science, he explicitly writes that "We have to understand that there is truth—and that it is to be made/to be done, that to attain [atteindre] it people have to create it, which means, first and foremost, to imagine it".

== Lasting influence ==
Castoriadis has influenced European (especially continental) thought in important ways. His interventions in sociological and political theory have resulted in some of the most well-known debates in political philosophy to emerge from the continent—particularly involving the figure of critical theorist Jürgen Habermas (University of Frankfurt am Main, 1983–1994), especially in his 1985 work The Philosophical Discourse of Modernity. In 1988, neopragmatist philosopher Richard Rorty (University of Virginia, 1982–1998), citing Castoriadis, proposed that meaningful political and social change cannot emerge simply by extending past or present trends; instead, we must articulate visions of the future using concepts not inherited from the past.

Sociologist Hans Joas (FAU, 1987–1990; JFKI at FU Berlin, 1993–1995) has published a number of articles in American journals in order to highlight the importance of Castoriadis' work to a North American sociological audience. Historical sociologist Jóhann Páll Árnason (La Trobe University, 1975–2003) has been of enduring importance both for his critical engagement with Castoriadis' thought and for his sustained efforts to introduce it to the English-speaking public (especially during his editorship of the journal Thesis Eleven).

In the 21st century, there has been growing interest in Castoriadis' thought, including the publication of two monographs authored by Árnason's former students: Jeff Klooger's (Swinburne University of Technology) Castoriadis: Psyche, Society, Autonomy (2009) and Suzi Adams's (Flinders University) Castoriadis's Ontology: Being and Creation (2011).

== Major publications ==
Original French

- Mai 68 : la brèche [May 68: The Breach], Fayard, 1968, under the pseudonym "Jean-Marc Coudray"; co-authored with Edgar Morin and Claude Lefort. (A book about the idea that the May 68 uprising opened a breach in the established order. Castoriadis' ideas were a significant influence on participants in May 68—a fact acknowledged by Daniel Cohn-Bendit.)
- La Société bureaucratique [Bureaucratic Society] in two volumes: Les Rapports de production en Russie and La Révolution contre la bureaucratie, 1973.
- L'Expérience du mouvement ouvrier [The Experience of the Labor Movement] in two volumes: Comment lutter and Prolétariat et organisation, 1974.
- L'Institution imaginaire de la société [The Imaginary Institution of Society], Seuil, 1975.
- Les Carrefours du labyrinthe [Crossroads in the Labyrinth], Volume I, 1978.
- Le Contenu du socialisme [On the Content of Socialism], 1979—originally published in three parts in S. ou B. (July 1955; translated in PSW 1, pp. 290–307), S. ou B. (July 1957; translated in PSW 2, pp. 90–154), and S. ou B. (January 1958; translated in PSW 2, pp. 155–192).
- Capitalisme moderne et révolution [Modern Capitalism and Revolution] in two volumes, 1979.
- De l'écologie à l'autonomie [EA] [From Ecology to Autonomy] (with Daniel Cohn-Bendit and the public of Louvain-la-Neuve), 1981.
- Devant la guerre, I : Les réalités [Facing the War], 1981 (a second volume was never published).
- Domaines de l'homme [Domains of Man] (Les carrefours du labyrinthe II), 1986.
- La Brèche: vingt ans après (réédition du livre de 1968 complété par de nouveaux textes) [The Breach: Twenty Years After], 1988.
- Le Monde morcelé [World in Fragments] (Les carrefours du labyrinthe III), 1990.
- La Montée de l'insignifiance [The Rising Tide of Insignificancy] (Les carrefours du labyrinthe IV), 1996.
- Fait et à faire [Done and to Be Done] (Les carrefours du labyrinthe V), 1997.

Original English

- Facing Reality (with C. L. R. James and Grace Lee Boggs), Detroit: Correspondence, 1958.

Posthumous publications

- Η Αρχαία Ελληνική Δημοκρατία και η Σημασία της για μας Σήμερα [Ancient Greek Democracy and Its Importance for Us Today], Athens: Ypsilon, 1999 (based on a lecture delivered in Leonidio on 17 August 1984).
- Figures du pensable [Figures of the Thinkable] (Les carrefours du labyrinthe VI), 1999.
- Sur Le Politique de Platon [Commentary on The Statesman of Plato], 1999.
- Sujet et vérité dans le monde social-historique. La création humaine 1 [Subject and Truth in the Social-Historical World. Human Creation 1], 2002.
- Ce qui fait la Grèce, 1. D'Homère à Héraclite. La création humaine 2 [What Makes Greece, 1. From Homer to Heraclitus. Human Creation 2], 2004.
- Φιλοσοφία και επιστήμη. Ένας διάλογος με τον Γεώργιο Λ. Ευαγγελόπουλο [Philosophy and Science. A Discussion with Yorgos L. Evangelopoulos], Athens: Eurasia books, 2004, ISBN 960-8187-09-5.
- Une Société à la dérive, entretiens et débats 1974–1997 [A Society Adrift], 2005.
- Post-scriptum sur l'insignifiance : entretiens avec Daniel Mermet; suivi de dialogue [Postscript on Insignificance: Interviews with Daniel Mermet; followed by a dialogue] (with Daniel Mermet), 2007.
- Fenêtre sur le chaos [Window on the Chaos] (compiled by Enrique Escobar, Myrto Gondicas, and Pascal Vernay), Seuil, 2007, ISBN 978-2-02-090826-9. (Castoriadis' writings on modern art and aesthetics.)
- Ce qui fait la Grèce, 2. La cité et les lois. La création humaine 3 [What Makes Greece, 2. The City and Laws. Human Creation 3], 2008.
- L'Imaginaire comme tel [The Imaginary as Such], 2008.
- Histoire et création : Textes philosophiques inédits, 1945–1967 [History and Creation: Unedited Philosophical Texts 1945–1967], 2009.
- Ce qui fait la Grèce, 3. Thucydide, la force et le droit. La création humaine 4 [What Makes Greece, 3. Thucydides, Force and Right. Human Creation 4], 2011.
- La Culture de l'égoïsme [The Culture of Egoism] (transcription of an interview that Castoriadis and Christopher Lasch gave to Michael Ignatieff in 1986; translated into French by Myrto Gondicas), Climats, 2012, ISBN 978-2-08-128463-0 (interview about the topic of the retreat of individuals from public space into private matters).
- Dialogue sur l'histoire et l'imaginaire social [Dialogue on History and the Social Imaginary], 2016 (transcription of an interview that Castoriadis gave to Paul Ricœur).

Collected political writings (8 vols.)

- Écrits politiques 1945–1997 [Political Writings 1945–1997] (compiled by Myrto Gondicas, Enrique Escobar and Pascal Vernay), Éditions du Sandre:
  - La Question du mouvement ouvrier [The Question of Workers' Movement] (vols. 1 and 2), 2012.
  - Quelle démocratie ? [What Democracy?] (vols. 3 and 4), 2013.
  - La Société bureaucratique [The Bureaucratic Society] (vol. 5), 2015.
  - Guerre et théories de la guerre [War and Theories of War] (vol. 6), 2016.
  - Écologie et politique, suivi de correspondances et compléments [Ecology and Politics – Followed by Correspondence and Additions] (vol. 7), 2020.
  - Sur la dynamique du capitalisme et autres textes, suivi de l'impérialisme et la guerre [On the Dynamics of Capitalism and Other Texts – Followed by Imperialism and War] (vol. 8), 2020.

Selected translations of works by Castoriadis

- The Imaginary Institution of Society [IIS] (trans. Kathleen Blamey). MIT Press, Cambridge, MA 1998 [1987]. 432 pp. ISBN 0-262-53155-0.
- Crossroads in the Labyrinth, Six-Volume Series. Translated from the French and edited anonymously as a public service (March 2022):
  - Vol. 1. Crossroads in the Labyrinth.
  - Vol. 2: Human Domains.
  - Vol. 3: World in Fragments.
  - Vol. 4: The Rising Tide of Insignificancy.
  - Vol. 5: Done and to Be Done.
  - Vol. 6: Figures of the Thinkable.
- The Castoriadis Reader [CR] (ed./trans. David Ames Curtis). Blackwell Publisher, Oxford 1997. 470 pp. ISBN 1-55786-704-6.
- World in Fragments: Writings on Politics, Society, Psychoanalysis, and the Imagination [WIF] (ed./trans. David Ames Curtis). Stanford University Press, Stanford, CA 1997. 507 pp. ISBN 0-8047-2763-5.
- Political and Social Writings [PSW 1]. Volume 1: 1946–1955. From the Critique of Bureaucracy to the Positive Content of Socialism (ed./trans. David Ames Curtis). University of Minnesota Press, Minneapolis 1988. 348 pp. ISBN 0-8166-1617-5.
- Political and Social Writings [PSW 2]. Volume 2: 1955–1960. From the Workers' Struggle Against Bureaucracy to Revolution in the Age of Modern Capitalism (ed./trans. David Ames Curtis). University of Minnesota Press, Minneapolis 1988. 363 pp. ISBN 0-8166-1619-1.
- Political and Social Writings [PSW 3]. Volume 3: 1961–1979. Recommencing the Revolution: From Socialism to the Autonomous Society (ed./trans. David Ames Curtis). University of Minnesota Press, Minneapolis 1992. 405 pp. ISBN 0-8166-2168-3.
- Modern Capitalism and Revolution [MCR] (trans. Maurice Brinton), London: Solidarity, 1965 (including an introduction and additional English material by Brinton; the second English edition was published by Solidarity in 1974, with a new introduction by Castoriadis).
- Philosophy, Politics, Autonomy. Essays in Political Philosophy [PPA] (ed. David Ames Curtis). Oxford University Press, New York/Oxford 1991. 306 pp. ISBN 0-19-506963-3.
- Crossroads in the Labyrinth [CL] (trans. M. H. Ryle/K. Soper). MIT Press, Cambridge, MA 1984. 345 pp.
- On Plato's Statesman [OPS] (trans. David Ames Curtis). Stanford University Press, Stanford, CA 2002. 227 pp.
- "The Crisis of Western Societies". Telos 53 (Fall 1982). New York: Telos Press.
- Figures of the Thinkable [FT B] (trans. Helen Arnold). Stanford University Press, Stanford, CA 2007. 304 pp. (Also anon. trans. February 2005 [FT A].)
- A Society Adrift. Interviews and Debates, 1974–1997 [SA] (trans. Helen Arnold). Fordham University Press, New York 2010. 259 pp. (Also anon. trans. October 2010: A Society Adrift: More Interviews and Discussions on The Rising Tide of Insignificancy, Including Revolutionary Perspectives Today.)
- "The Dilapidation of the West: An Interview with Cornelius Castoriadis" (trans. David Ames Curtis), Thesis Eleven, May 1995, 41(1):94–114.
- "Psychoanalysis and Politics", in: Sonu Shamdasani and Michael Münchow (eds.), Speculations After Freud: Psychoanalysis, Philosophy, and Culture, Routledge, 1994, pp. 1–12 (also in: World in Fragments, 1997, pp. 125–136).
- Postscript on Insignificance: Dialogues with Cornelius Castoriadis [PI B] (ed./trans. Gabriel Rockhill and John V. Garner). Continuum, 2011. 160 pp. ISBN 978-1-4411-3960-3. (Also anon. trans. March 2011: Postscript on Insignificancy, including More Interviews and Discussions on the Rising Tide of Insignificancy, followed by Six Dialogues, Four Portraits and Two Book Reviews [PI A].)
- The Rising Tide of Insignificancy (The Big Sleep) [RTI]. Anon. trans. Electronic publication date: December 2003.
- Democracy and Relativism: A Debate [DR]. Translated from the French by John V. Garner. Rowman & Littlefield, 2019. ISBN 978-1786610959. (Also anon. trans. January 2013.)
- Window on the Chaos, Including "How I Didn't Become a Musician" [WC]. Anon. trans. Electronic publication date: July 2015.

== See also ==
- Agonistic/radical democracy
- Autopoiesis
- Autonomism
- Hahnel, Robin
- Maxwell, Clara Gibson
- Open Marxism
- Orr, Aki
- The Owl's Legacy
- Social ontology
- Sociological imagination / imagined community
- Tamtakos, Yannis
- Workers' council / workers' self-management

== Sources ==
- Andrew Arato. From Neo-Marxism to Democratic Theory – Essays on the Critical Theory of Soviet-Type Societies. M. E. Sharpe, 1993. ISBN 978-0-7656-1853-5
- François Dosse. Castoriadis – Une vie. La Découverte, 2014. ISBN 978-2-7071-7126-9.
- François Dosse. Amitiés philosophiques. Éditions Odile Jacob, 2021: Ch. 5 – "Claude Lefort et Cornelius Castoriadis : les meilleurs ennemis" (pp. 205–248). ISBN 978-2-7381-5756-0.
- Anthony Elliott. Critical Visions: New Directions in Social Theory. Rowman & Littlefield, 2003. ISBN 978-0-7425-2690-7.
- Marios Emmanouilidis. Heretical Paths: Greek Trotskyism and the Second World War [Αιρετικές διαδρομές. Ο ελληνικός τροτσκισμός και ο Β' παγκόσμιος πόλεμος]. Filistor, 2002.
- Takis Fotopoulos. "Castoriadis and the Democratic Tradition" ["Ο Καστοριάδης και η Δημοκρατική Παράδοση"]. Nea Koinoniologia, vol. 31. Autumn 2000.
- Stathis Gourgouris. Does Literature Think?. Stanford University Press. 2003.
- Alexandros Kioupkiolis. Freedom and Subjectivity in Marx, Liberalism and the Work of Cornelius Castoriadis. Somerville College, Oxford. 2005.
- Nikolas Kompridis. Critique and Disclosure: Critical Theory between Past and Future. MIT Press, 2006. ISBN 978-0-2622-7742-6.
- Meletis Meletopoulos. "The Unknown Youth of Cornelius Castoriadis" ["Η άγνωστη νεότητα του Κορνήλιου Καστοριάδη"]. Nea Koinoniologia, vol. 44. Spring 2008.
- Christos Memos. Castoriadis and Critical Theory: Crisis, Critique and Radical Alternatives. Palgrave Macmillan, 2014. ISBN 978-1-137-03447-2.
- Christos Memos. Open Marxism: Critical Theory as Militant Enlightenment.. Bloomsbury Academic. 2025.
- Toula Nicolacopoulos and George Vassilacopoulos. (Un)Willing Collectives: On Castoriadis. re.press, 2018.
- Panagiotis Noutsos. The Socialist Thought in Greece from 1875–1974, Volume III: The Consolidation of "Marxism-Leninism" and the Divergent or Heterogeneous Elaborations (1926–1955) [Η σοσιαλιστική σκέψη στην Ελλάδα από το 1875-1974 – ΙΙΙ: Η εδραίωση του «μαρξισμού-λενινισμού» και οι αποκλίνουσες ή ετερογενείς επεξεργασίες (1926-1955)]. Gnosis. 1993.
- Yorgos Oikonomou. "Cornelius Castoriadis Bibliography in Greek". Nea Koinoniologia, vol. 31. Autumn 2000.
- Yorgos Oikonomou. "Significant milestones in the life of Cornelius Castoriadis". Nea Koinoniologia, vol. 43. Winter 2006–07.
- Alan D. Schrift. Twentieth-Century French Philosophy: Key Themes and Thinkers. John Wiley & Sons, 2006. ISBN 978-1-4051-4394-3.
- Theofanis Tasis. Castoriadis – A philosophy of autonomy [Καστοριάδης – Μια φιλοσοφία της αυτονομίας]. Athens: Eurasia books. 2007. ISBN 978-960-8187-22-1.
- Theofanis Tassis. Cornelius Castoriadis – Outline of a Philosophy [Cornelius Castoriadis – Disposition einer Philosophie]. FU Berlin. 2007.
- Alexandros Schismenos. The Human Tempest – Psyche and Αutonomy in the Philosophy of Cornelius Castoriadis [Η Ανθρώπινη Τρικυμία – Ψυχή και Αυτονομία στη Φιλοσοφία του Κορνήλιου Καστοριάδη]. Athens: Exarcheia. 2013. ISBN 978-618-80336-5-8.
- Yannis Tamtakos, Memories of a Life in the Revolutionary Movement [Αναμνήσεις μιας ζωής στο επαναστατικό κίνημα], Kykloi Antiexousias. 2003. ISBN 978-960-92191-0-5.
