= Marxist Workers' League =

Marxist Workers League can refer to:

- The Marxist Workers' League (Finland); a Trotskyist group associated with the Co-ordinating Committee for the Refoundation of the Fourth International, formerly a member of the International Workers' Committee
- The Marxist Workers' League (Turkey); a Trotskyist group associated with the Coordinating Committee for the Refoundation of the Fourth International
- The Marxist Workers League (US); either of two groups to split from the Oehlerite Revolutionary Workers League
