= Dimitris Giotopoulos =

Greek Marxist who fought in the Spanish Civil War

- Born: 1901; Giannitsou, Phthiotis, Greece
- Died: 1965 (aged 63–64)
- Other name: Witte
- Education: University of Athens
- Organization(s): EKD/KOMLEA (1929–1934); KAKE (1934–1951)
- Movement: Marxism
- Children: Alexandros Giotopoulos

Dimitris "Mitsos" Giotopoulos (Greek: Δημήτρης "Μήτσος" Γιωτόπουλος; 1901–1965) was a Greek Marxist who fought in the Spanish Civil War.

== Early life ==
He was born in 1901 in Giannitsou, Phthiotis. In 1920, he started studying chemistry at the University of Athens. He joined the Youth of KKE but was erased from its ranks in 1921. In 1923, he joined the Archeio-Marxist party First Core and in 1926 became its leader. In 1929, he became the leader of its successor party Union of Communist Internationalists (EKD), which was renamed Communist Bolshevik–Leninist Organization of Greece (KOMLEA) in 1930. In the 1930s, he was publishing the newspaper Πάλη των Τάξεων ("Class Struggle"). According to some historians, he behaved in an authoritarian manner and opposed democratic processes. According to communist activist Agis Stinas, Giotopoulos received money and gave directions to his comrades in the name of a higher authority which did not really exist, as he took all decisions himself.

== Cooperation with Trotsky ==
In 1926, Giotopoulos started speaking in favour of Trotsky in political meetings. In 1932, he visited Trotsky at Büyükada. Giotopoulos informed Trotsky about his party's stance towards KKE and about the existence of the agrarian movement and agrarian reforms in Greece. Trotsky suggested that Communist Archio-Marxist Party of Greece (KAKE) should adopt the slogan "for a peasant-worker government." Giotopoulos disagreed with Trotsky on the independence of Thrace and Macedonia, and claimed that Macedonia was not ethnically homogeneous. He also pointed out that the Communist Archio-Marxist Party of Greece supported the self determination of Cyprus and of the Dodecanese; on the other hand, the alliance of KKE with the Bulgarian nationalists had diminished it popular appeal.

After this meeting, Giotopoulos became the general secretary of the International Left Opposition under the name "Witte". Giotopoulos disagreed with Trotsky on the creation of the Fourth International; Trotsky on the other hand, accused Giotopoulos of inactivity: "Until September, comrade Witte was our professional secretary for ... months. All comrades recognize that precisely during this period the International Secretariat was completely inexistent. In 1934, the Communist Archio-Marxist Party of Greece split from Trotsky's movement after significant ideological fallout.

== Spanish Civil War ==
After the coup of Metaxas, Giotopoulos went to France. He participated to the Spanish Civil War, affiliated with POUM. In 1937, he was imprisoned in Barcelona as part of the communist purge against POUM that started after the May Days. He was released in 1939 and he escaped to France.

== Return to Greece ==
He returned to Greece from France after the end of World War II. He continued being the leader of the Archio-Marxist Party of Greece, which, unlike the KKE, operated legally. Said party opposed the Democratic Army of Greece during the civil war and in 1949, his party sent a congratulatory telegram upon the victory of the Government on the Democratic Army of Greece. In his late years, he allegedly became a counselor of the conservative politician Theofylaktos Papakonstantinou. The leader of terrorist group 17N Alexandros Giotopoulos is his son.

== See also ==
- Michel Pablo
