= Yannis Tamtakos =

Greek political activist (1908–2008)

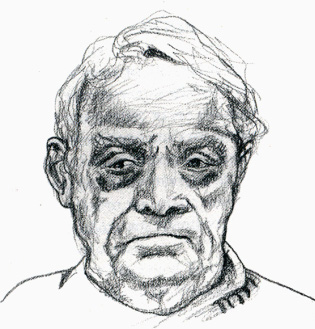
- Born: 1908; Foça, Ottoman Empire
- Died: January 4, 2008 (aged 99–100); Thessaloniki, Greece
- Occupation: Political activist
- Political party: KDKE
- Movement: Trotskyism (early); Anarchism (late)

Yannis Tamtakos (Greek: Γιάννης Ταμτάκος; 1908 – January 4, 2008) was a Greek political activist, initially a Trotskyist and later in life an anarchist. Due to his political activity, he was chased by the Axis forces, the Greek state, and the National Liberation Front. For several years before his death, he was the oldest surviving participant of the 1936 Thessaloniki strike.

== Biography ==
Tamtakos took part in every workers' struggle in Thessaloniki as a shoemaker, having been elected committee member (1926–1927) and secretary (1928–1929) of the Union of the Shoemakers of Thessaloniki. Later, he became active through the Union of the Unemployed. In 1931, while on the front line of a demonstration of the unemployed, in Syntrivani Square in Thessaloniki, he was attacked by a group of policemen, led by the nephew of the Head of the Police; he was shot in the cheek, and the bullet cut his tongue. He did not lose his ability to speak, thanks to surgery.

Tamtakos and his comrades were persecuted by the German occupiers, the Security Battalions, but also by the anti-fascist National Liberation Front (EAM). He managed to escape assassination efforts by EAM quite a few times while he used several identities and nicknames during the period of the occupation and of the liberation of Greece.

In Dekemvriana, he accused the forces of EAM of carrying out a Stalinist coup d'état. In 1948, his political Trotskyist party KDKE (founded by Agis Stinas) participated in the Second World Congress of the Fourth International, when the party representative was Cornelius Castoriadis.

== Published material ==
His book Memories of a Life in the Revolutionary Movement, which was published in March 2003, contains transcripts of recorded self-biographic tellings, including references to historical and political events of the last century. Part of his diary was published in 1995, in the Alfa newspaper.

Yannis Tamtakos was one of the main characters in the movie Koursal, directed by Nikos Theodossiou.

== See also ==
- Anarchism in Greece
