= Pandelis Pouliopoulos =

Greek communist politician

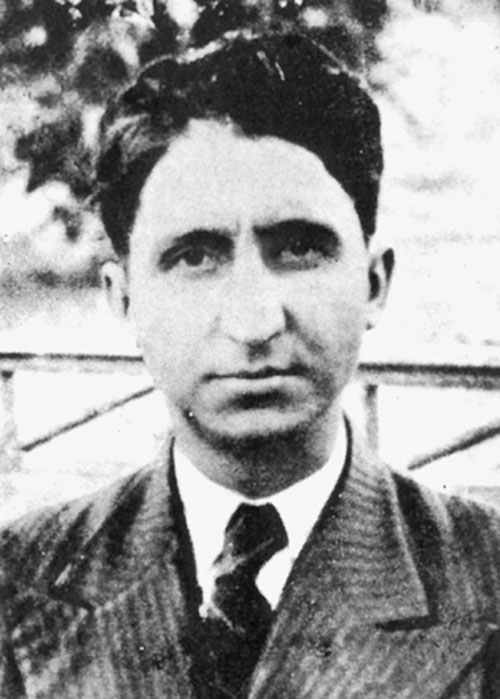

General Secretary of the Communist Party of Greece
- In office December 1924 – September 1926

Personal details
- Born: 10 March 1900 Thebes, Greece
- Died: 6 June 1943 (aged 43) Larissa, Greece
- Party: KKE; Spartacus League; OKDE

Pandelis Pouliopoulos (Greek: Παντελής Πουλιόπουλος; 10 March 1900 – 6 June 1943) was a Greek communist, anti-fascist, and one-time general secretary of the Communist Party of Greece (KKE). He stood for the internationalist and revolutionary character of the communist movement. He is among the founders of the Trotskyist movement in Greece.

== Biography ==
Born in Thebes, Greece, Pouliopoulos enrolled at Athens University in 1919 to study law. In 1919, he joined the Socialist Labour Party of Greece (SEKE), the forerunner of the Communist Party of Greece.

In 1920, he was conscripted to fight in the Greek-Turkish war of 1919–1922. He was arrested in 1922 for anti-war activity but was freed with the end of the war.

From 1923 to 1925, Pouliopoulos was prominent in the war veterans' movement and was elected president of the Panhellenic Federation of Veterans (Πανελλήνια Ομοσπονδία Παλαιών Πολεμιστών και Θυμάτων Στρατών) in 1924.

In 1924, he was a party delegate to the Fifth Congress of the Comintern. Later that year, he became general secretary of the KKE. On 24 August 1925, Pouliopoulos, along with 23 others, was put on trial in Athens on charges of promoting the autonomy of Macedonia and Thrace. He gave a five-hour speech in his defence and the trial was adjourned. On 22 February, 1926, the trial of the "autonomists" resumed. The charges were dropped, but instead of being released, the men were exiled to Anafi, Amorgos and Folegandros islands.

Pouliopoulos was taken to Folegandros island. He was freed in 1926 with the fall of the Pangalos dictatorship. Although he resigned in September 1926 after his leadership was blamed for the poor performance of the party, he was reinstated by the Comintern.

At the party's Third Regular Congress in March 1927, Pouliopoulos (along with Pastias Giatsopoulos) was removed from the Central Committee. Later that year, they were formally expelled from the party as liquidationists after publishing and circulating the pamphlet New Beginning (Greek: Neo Ksekinima). They subsequently formed an opposition group, the Greek Spartacus League, which aligned itself with the International Left Opposition. They began to publish a journal called Spartacus from December 1928 onwards. They refused to join the Archeio-Marxists (then called First Core), which split from the KKE, regarding it as having a sectarian attitude towards the party.

When the Archeio-Marxists were accepted as the representatives of the International Left Opposition in Greece, Leon Trotsky condemned Pouliopoulos' group, which was excluded from the Trotskyist movement along with the KEO/LAKKE (the so-called "Fractionalists") who had just split from the Archeio-Marxists and were led by Michel Pablo.

In 1934, the two groups, Spartacus and LAKKE, joined together to set up the Organisation of Internationalist Communists of Greece (OKDE), and for a while, Pouliopoulos maintained links with other opposition groups around Landau and Molinier, opposing the movement to create a new International from 1933 onwards. However, he took the initiative in the move to unite the Greek Trotskyists in 1938 to form the United OKDE (EOKDE). In September 1938, the EOKDE was present at the founding of the Fourth International in Paris.

In 1938, after going into hiding, he was eventually arrested by the Metaxas dictatorship and imprisoned in the Acronauplia, where he continued his work. In 1943, along with over a hundred other militants, he was executed by the Italian occupation forces in Nezero near Larissa, in retaliation for the destruction by partisans of the Kournovo tunnel. There is a postwar claim that he spoke in Italian to the firing squad, exhorting them not to commit such a crime against the anti-fascist resistance and opponents of the war. When the soldiers refused to execute him, Carabinieri are said to have done so instead.

Pouliopoulos translated into Greek Marx's Das Kapital and Critique of Political Economy, L. Trotsky’s The Revolution Betrayed, K. Kautsky’s Economic Theories of Karl Marx and Kant and also N. Bukharin’s History of Historical Materialism.

== Sources ==
- Pouliopoulos biography, from "Encyclopedia of Marxism" of Marxists Internet Archive
- Pandelis Pouliopoulos Archive, a section of Marxists Internet Archive
- Stalinism and Trotskyism in Greece (1924-1949) by Loukas Karliaftis at Revolutionary History magazine
