= Michel Pablo =

Greek Trotskyist leader (1911–1996)

- Μισέλ Πάμπλο
- Born: Michalis N. Raptis; August 24, 1911; Alexandria, Khedivate of Egypt, Ottoman Empire
- Died: February 17, 1996 (aged 84); Athens, Greece
- Education: National Technical University of Athens
- Alma mater: University of Paris
- Organization(s): FI (1938–1953); USFI (1963–1965); IRMT (1965–1992)
- Political party: KOMLEA (1928–1930); KEO/LAKKE (1930–1933); PASOK (1974–1996)
- Movement: Trotskyism

Michel Pablo (/ˈpɑːbloʊ/; Greek: Μισέλ Πάμπλο; 24 August 1911 – 17 February 1996) was the pseudonym of Michalis N. Raptis (Μιχάλης Ν. Ράπτης), a Trotskyist leader of Greek origin.

== Education ==
Pablo studied at the National Technical University of Athens and continued at the University of Paris, specializing in urban planning.

== Early activism ==
Pablo joined the Trotskyist faction of the Archeio-Marxist party KOMLEA in 1928. In 1930, a group led by him split from KOMLEA and formed the Communist Unification Group (Κομμουνιστική Ενωτική Ομάδα, ΚΕΟ, KEO), which had Trotskyist leanings and renounced Archeio-Marxism. KEO, after failing to merge with the Trotskyist group Spartacus League (led by Pandelis Pouliopoulos), was renamed in 1932 (following the involvement of Agis Stinas, who had been expelled from the KKE) to LAKKE. In 1933, Stinas left the group, and in 1934, LAKKE merged with Spartacus to form the OKDE.

During the 4th of August Regime (1936–1941) of Ioannis Metaxas, Pablo was arrested and exiled in the Aegean island of Folegandros. There he was not admitted by the orthodox communists, also in exile, so he joined the company of cattle and horse thieves, who at that time were punished with exile. In Folegandros, he met his future wife, Elli Dyovounioti (Ελλη Δυοβουνιώτη). In 1937, he was transferred to Acronauplia and was eventually deported to Paris, France, with his wife. There, Pablo assumed his pseudonym (he had previously been known by his birth name, Raptis) and represented the Greek Trotskyist group EOKDE (formerly OKDE) at the founding conference of the Fourth International (its First World-Congress), held just outside Paris in September 1938. (Note: Another Greek Trotskyist group was represented at the Congress: KDEE.)

When Nazi Germany occupied France in 1940, Pablo stayed in Paris, where he organized illegal propaganda and was involved in the reconstruction and reunification of the French Trotskyist movement, which was operating underground into the Provisional European Secretariat of the Fourth International.

== Leadership of the Fourth International ==
In February 1944, Pablo, fully involved with the movement, was elected the General Secretary of the European Bureau of the Fourth International (FI), which had re-established contact among the European Trotskyist parties. As leader of the European Bureau, Pablo also played a key role in re-unifying, re-centralising and re-orienting the FI.

In March 1944, he mediated the reunification of the French Trotskyist parties into PCI.

In July 1946, he visited Greece to help convene the Unification Congress of the Greek Trotskyist groups in Penteli, which successfully reunified the two main Trotskyist parties, EDKE (formerly EOKDE) and (Agis Stinas') DEKE, into KDKE.

Pablo and Ernest Mandel were instrumental in winning the FI to a position that asserted that the Eastern European states conquered by the Soviet Armed Forces in 1944–45 had by 1948 become what they described as deformed workers' states.

Pablo participated in the Second World-Congress in April 1948 and served as General Secretary of the FI from 1948 to 1960.

=== Turn to the mass parties ===
In the uncertain aftermath of World War II, when the Trotskyists were numerically dwarfed by the mass communist parties and their hopes for a revolutionary breakthrough were dashed, Pablo also advanced a new tactic for the FI from its Third World-Congress in 1951 onward. He argued that a Third World War was believed by many people to be imminent. In his document "Where are we going", Pablo writes, "such a war would take on, from the very beginning, the character of an international civil war, especially in Europe and in Asia. These continents would rapidly pass over under the control of the Soviet bureaucracy, of the Communist Parties, or of the revolutionary masses". Splits of revolutionary dissenters were likely to develop in the traditional mass parties of the working class. To gain influence, win members, establish a Marxist wing and most importantly to avoid becoming isolated sectarian circles with no connection to the working class, the Trotskyists should—where possible—join, or in Trotskyist terminology enter, the mass communist or social democratic (Labour) parties. This form of entryism was intended to be a long-term tactic. It was understood by all that the FI would retain its political identity and its own press. Entry was seldom carried out without splits or even violent conflict within the local propaganda circles, but proved to greatly add to local groups' flexibility where it was put into practice. Independent work should continue in Latin America, Ceylon, the United States, India.

The innovative part of Pablo's proposed "entryism sui generis", which was accepted by the Tenth Plenum of the Third World-Congress of the Fourth International, was in the approach to the Stalinist parties wherever they were a majority working-class party. Due to the extremely bureaucratic leadership of the Stalinist parties, Trotskyists would be prevented from proceeding in the same way as they would with reformist mass-parties, and had to maintain separate independent work, which "must be understood as having its chief aim to assist the work of entry".

These changes in policy were adopted by the Fourth International in the early months of 1952.

=== The "Pabloite" Fourth International ===
Under the weight of the controversy that was caused by the resolutions adopted at the Third World-Congress of the Fourth International, factions in the US-SWP as well as the British section of the FI started to build a faction within the International, which broke away in 1953, constituting the International Committee of the Fourth International (ICFI).

==== Rise and decline of Stalinism ====
The Fourth World-Congress of the Fourth International in 1954 was entitled "Rise and Decline of Stalinism". Inspired by the Cuban Revolution as well as the Tito–Stalin split demonstrating that the Stalinist Communist Parties may not unalterably subordinate to Stalin, Pablo also started to argue that even the Stalinist parties who were in power in various countries at the time could be pushed into taking leadership in revolutionary conflicts by the mass activity of the working class, which caused further controversy and division within the ranks of the FI. Pablo was speculating on a split between the Stalinist regimes in China and the USSR as early as 1951. Pablo writes: "the rise of Communist Parties to power is not the consequence of a capacity of Stalinism to struggle for the Revolution, does not alter the internationally counter-revolutionary role of Stalinism, but it is the product of an exceptional combination of circumstances which has imposed the seizure of power either upon the Soviet bureaucracy (in the case of the European buffer zone) or upon certain Communist Parties (Yugoslavia, China)".

==== Colonial revolution and guerrillaism ====
The Fifth World-Congress in 1957 recognized for the first time that a major world depression was not likely in the near future. The central document emphasized the basic role of workers' democracy, not only as political factor, but also as indispensable for economic development. The second document was on "Colonial Revolution since the End of the Second World War", focusing on conflicts between French imperialism and the Vietminh, the Algerian War, and the Suez crisis, which led to the nationalisation of the Suez Canal. The document argued that since the world revolution had first been successful in the East, instead of—as was expected by Marxist theoreticians—in the Western countries. Colonial revolution, which could only be victorious as permanent revolution, thus was an integral part of the world revolution, and constituted a link between October and the triumph of the world revolution. The document contained a detailed study of the colonial movements, examined the respective roles of proletariat and peasantry in the colonial countries and emphasised the importance of guerrilla warfare in colonial countries, not only as a military factor but as a factor in the organisation and political education of the masses. The congress insisted on the necessity for the Trotskyist movement, especially in the imperialist countries, to devote a large part of its activity to aiding colonial revolution.

Pablo was personally engaged in supporting the Algerian national liberation struggle against France. In 1959, he set up and operated a secret munitions factory, hidden within a citrus plantation in the Moroccan city of Kentire, where they manufactured a lightweight version of the Sten submachinegun while also overseeing a workshop on the Dutch-German border that produced counterfeit passports and cash to support the FLN.

==== Arrest in Amsterdam ====
In 1960, it was decided to move the headquarters of the Fourth International from Paris to Amsterdam because of the return of Charles de Gaulle to power, which made it less advisable to stay in Paris. In Amsterdam, it was thought, the Trotskyists would be freer to operate, and they would be closer to the European headquarters of the Algerian Revolution, which was in Cologne.

In July 1960, he was arrested in Amsterdam along with Sal Santen. A campaign for Pablo's release was launched by Jean-Paul Sartre. After Pablo's arrest, it was decided to move the International Secretariat to Rome, with the reason being that of the members of the Bureau of the Secretariat – Pierre Frank, Ernest Mandel and Livio Maitan – Maitan was the only one who could devote full-time to work for the IS. Pablo opposed this decision.

In 1961, Pablo was finally sentenced to 15 months' imprisonment and released at the end of his trial. After his release, he went to Great Britain, where through the intervention of supporters of his in Morocco, he was provided with a Moroccan passport. He took refuge in Morocco. After the victory of the Algerian Revolution in 1962, he became an adviser in the economic reconstruction in the Government of Ahmed Ben-Bella. Pablo was also part of a four-man committee tasked with drawing up a decree concerning property that had been seized by the Algerians after the French colonials had fled the country. He served in these positions until the Algerian government was overthrown in the 1965 Algerian coup d'état. Pablo then moved to Switzerland in 1965.

=== Reunification ===
Meanwhile, in 1963, ICFI groups around the Socialist Workers Party (SWP) were moving back towards unity with the ISFI, sharing common positions towards the Cuban Revolution. Pablo was regarded by the SWP as a barrier to that unification. The 1963 World Congress (the seventh one) formed the reunified Fourth International. Pablo moved a counter-resolution at the 1963 reunification congress, as well as the main resolution on Algeria, and was elected to the international executive committee. Tensions grew, and Pablo and his African Bureau were ousted from the International by the end of 1965 for partly disputed reasons: in the International's view, Pablo's tendency's orientation on what was commonly portrayed as "Third-World guerrillaism" broke with the International publicly and placed itself outside the FI. Being busy with the situation in Algeria also made it difficult for him to defend himself against accusations leveraged against him by the FI's leadership. By then, Pablo had key political differences with the FI. In addition, Pablo was critical of the prospect of re-unification of the Trotskyist movement as advocated by Ernest Mandel, Joseph Hansen and others.

Pablo himself declared his differences with the United Secretariat as follows:

1. Disagreement with the assessment of Maoism as evolving towards revolutionary Marxist positions, to which it was necessary to offer critical support.
2. Disagreement with the assessment of the Khrushchev tendency of the Soviet bureaucracy as a simple personal quarrel. Pablo had maintained that the Khrushchev tendency was more receptive to pressures of Soviet society than the Stalinist tendency that sought to overthrow it.
3. Disagreement with the support given by the executive committee of the United Secretariat to Holden Roberto against the People's Movement for the Liberation of Angola (MPLA) in Angola. Pablo favored supporting the latter.

Publicly defending those positions would lead to Pablo and his supporters being accused of having violated democratic centralism, thus placing themselves outside the Fourth International. This was followed by the expulsion of Pablo's supporters from the United Secretariat.

== Outside the Fourth International ==
During the Greek Colonels' Dictatorship in Greece in 1967, Pablo, together with Andreas Papandreou, established a network to assist resistance members' escape abroad.

After being expelled, Pablo and his supporters regrouped in 1965 as the International Revolutionary Marxist Tendency of the Fourth International (TMRIQI; known as International Revolutionary Marxist Tendency or IRMT after 1972) internationally. This group dropped the reference to the Fourth International during its meetings in 1972 and at the same time proclaimed it no longer considered itself Trotskyist nor a party of world revolution. Instead they considered themselves a Marxist tendency fostering self-government on all levels within social movements. This coincided with Pablo being politically active in Chile under Allende's government.

In 1979, the TMRI would send an open letter to members of the Fourth International, calling for the need to "develop new directions, new forms of struggle and of organization" as well as "the elaboration of a transition program based on socialist autogestion". The United Secretariat paid little attention to this letter. A resolution of the Seventh International Conference of the TMRI in 1980 declares the adoption of Christian Rakovsky's theory of "bureaucratic centrism".

After the fall of the Greek Colonels' Dictatorship, Pablo returned to Greece, played a role in the founding of the Panhellenic Socialist Movement (PASOK) and, from 1981, served as Special Advisor to Prime Minister Andreas Papandreou.

The sections of the IRMT rejoined the reunified Fourth International in 1992, although the agreement was not applied in Pablo's individual case.

Unusually for a revolutionary, his funeral was a state event in his native Greece. This is explained by his personal friendship from the 1930s with Papandreou, who had been a Trotskyist in his youth. Pablo's motto was: "The meaning of life is life itself" (Νόημα της ζωής είναι η ίδια η ζωή).

== Bibliography ==
- Michel Raptis, Revolution and Counter Revolution in Chile: A Dossier on Workers' Participation in the Revolutionary Process (London: Allison & Busby, 1974).
- Michel Raptis, Socialism, Democracy & Self-Management: Political Essays (London: Allison & Busby, 1980).
- Michel Raptis, Étude pour une politique agraire en Algerie.

== See also ==
- Dimitris Giotopoulos
