= EKD (disambiguation) =

EKD is the Evangelical Church in Germany (German: Evangelische Kirche in Deutschland).

EKD may refer to:

- Basque Christian Democracy (Basque: Euskal Kristau Demokrazia), a defunct political party
- Warsaw Commuter Railway (Polish: Elektryczne Koleje Dojazdowe)
- Union of Communist Internationalists (Greek: Ένωση Κομμουνιστών Διεθνιστών, ΕΚΔ), a defunct political party
