= Agis Stinas =

Greek political activist (1900–1987)

- Born: 1900; Spartylas, Corfu, Greece
- Died: November 6, 1987 (aged 86–87); Athens, Greece
- Occupations: Politician, political activist
- Organization: FI (1938–1947)
- Political party: KKE (1918–1931); LAKKE (1932–1933); OMLE (1935); KDEE (1935–1942); KDKE (Note: KDKE was previously known as "Occupation-era KDKE" (1942), "DKKE" (1943), and "DEKE" (1944). It was renamed "KDKE" in 1946 and dissolved in 1967.) (1942–1947)
- Movement: Archeio-Marxism/Trotskyism (1932–1947); Chaulieu–Montal Tendency (from 1958); Anarchism (late)

Agis Stinas (Greek: Άγις Στίνας; real name: Spyros Priftis (Σπύρος Πρίφτης); 1900 – November 6, 1987) was a Greek politician and political activist. He was an executive of the Communist Party of Greece and then an executive of various small Trotskyist parties. During the Axis occupation of Greece, he promoted a revolutionary defeatist position. He was the political mentor of Cornelius Castoriadis.

== Biography ==
He was born in the village Spartylas in Corfu. In 1918, he became a member of the Socialist Workers' Party of Greece (SEKE), later renamed the Communist Party of Greece (KKE). He took part in the Greco-Turkish War (1919–1922) as an active party member. He was sentenced to death, but instead he was imprisoned. During the 1926 Greek parliamentary election, he was a parliamentary candidate in the Corfu region. In 1931, he was expelled from the party.

In 1932–33, he was a member of LAKKE party (led by Michel Pablo; a splinter group from the Archeio-Marxist/Trotskyist party KOMLEA). In 1935, he joined the Bolshevik–Leninist Organization of Greece – OMLE (led by Giorgis Vitsoris; another splinter group from KOMLEA).

During the 1935 Greek coup d'état attempt, he was a critical supporter of the democratic army officials. The same year, he joined the Communist Internationalist Union of Greece – KDEE (1935–1942), a splinter group of OMLE. In 1936, he promoted the need for a general strike. Later, he was arrested by the 4th of August Regime and jailed in Acronauplia. In prison in 1937, he formed the opinion of not supporting the USSR in the next world war.

In the early 1940s, with the assistance of the far-right metropolitan bishop (of Karystia) Panteleimon, he managed to escape prison. In 1942, he founded the Trotskyist party KDKE (later renamed DKKE in 1943, DEKE in 1944, and then KDKE again in 1946; dissolved in 1967) with comrades Yannis Tamtakos and Cornelius Castoriadis, who rejected the Communist-led National Liberation Front and promoted revolutionary defeatism. In 1946, he tried to stop his party from working with the Communist Party, and accused the Communist Party as a stooge of the Soviet Union.

In his memoirs, Stinas wrote that he was a member of the Fourth International (FI) until 1947. In April 1948, Stinas was represented by Cornelius Castoriadis in the Second World Congress of the FI. After the Greek Civil War, he worked against United Democratic Left.
