= Coordinating Committee for the Refoundation of the Fourth International =

Trotskyist international organisation

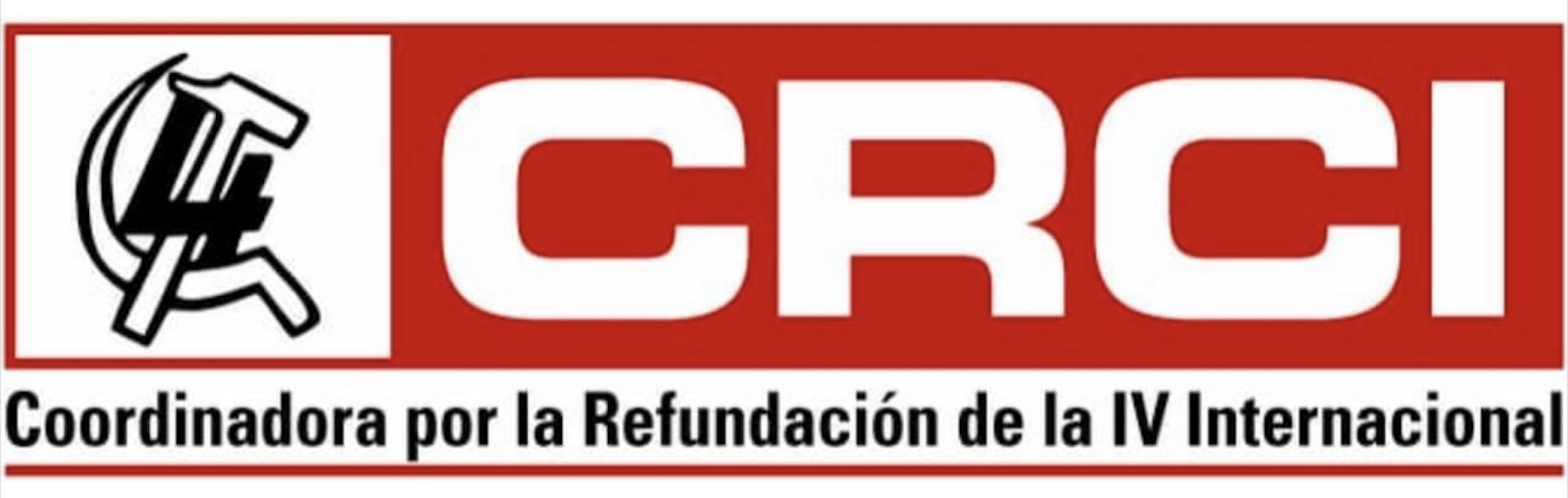

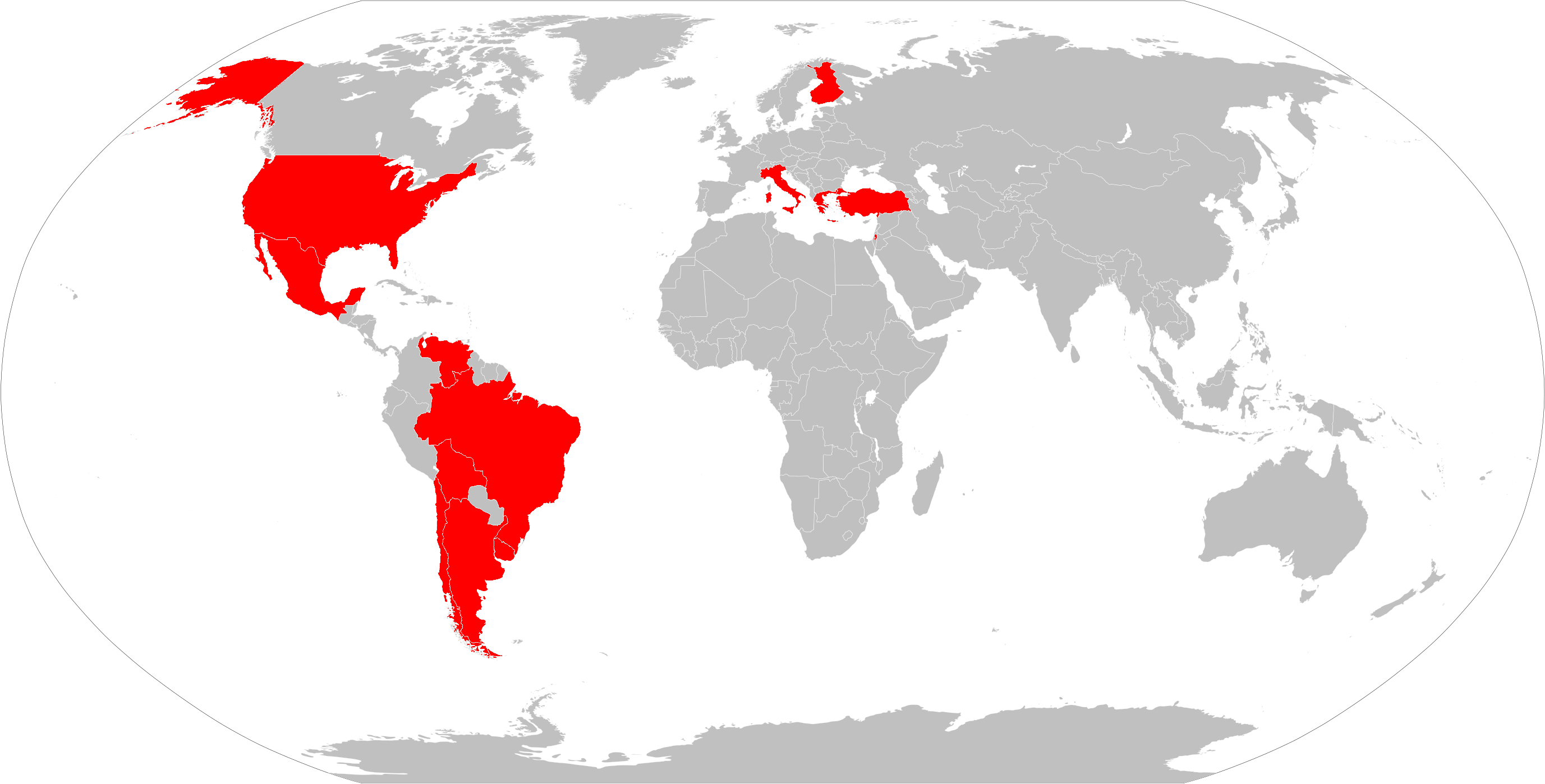
- Map of countries with at least one party that was affiliated with the CRFI
- Abbreviation: CRFI (English) / CRCI (Spanish)
- Successor: International Trotskyist Opposition (ITO; 2020–present)
- Formation: 2004
- Dissolved: 2020
- Type: Association of Trotskyist political parties and organisations
- Region served: Worldwide
- Members: 13 Sections
- Key people: Jorge Altamira, Savas Matsas, Sungur Savran, Marco Ferrando
- Affiliations: Trotskyism, Marxism, Socialism, Revolutionary socialism, Unionism, Activism

The Coordinating Committee for the Refoundation of the Fourth International (CRFI; Spanish: Coordinadora por la Refundación de la Cuarta Internacional, CRCI) was a Trotskyist international association. It was formed in 2004 at a conference in Buenos Aires called by the Movement for the Refoundation of the Fourth International (itself founded in 1997 in Genoa). It had members in South America, Western Europe, and the Middle East. The committee had nine members from Argentina, Chile, Greece, Italy, Mexico, Uruguay, Turkey, Finland and Venezuela. They included Jorge Altamira, Savas Matsas, Sungur Savran and Marco Ferrando.

The Argentinian PO was the largest section of the CRFI and as such, drew its international co-thinkers into the new organisation from other countries in Latin America. However the Workers Revolutionary Party of Greece and the International Trotskyist Opposition had different roots from the PO and its allies. The fusion of these groups provided the CRFI with bases in both Greece and Italy.

It held a conference of worker-militants in the European and Mediterranean region in Athens in June 2013. It held a further meeting of its International Committee in December 2013. It held a second conference of worker-militants in the European and Mediterranean region in Athens in March 2014.

It had next conference "Creating new International" on 2–3 April 2018 in Buenos Aires, hosted by PO of Argentina. The Leader of Russian United Communist Party Darya Mitina was invited, therefore meeting attracted criticism from International Committee of the Fourth International (SEP) based on the allegations of cooperation with "Stalinist forces".

== Sections ==
Sections	Name	English Translation
Argentina	Partido Obrero	Workers' Party
Brazil	Partido da Causa Operária Tribuna Classista	Workers' Cause Party Classist Tribune
Bolivia	Oposición Trotskista	Trotskyist Opposition
Chile	Partido Obrero Revolucionario	Revolutionary Workers' Party
Italy	Partito Comunista dei Lavoratori	Workers' Communist Party
Palestine	رابطة العمال الاشتراكية / Rabitat al-‘Oummal al-Ishtirakiyya	Socialist League of Workers
Mexico	Grupo de Acción Revolucionaria	
Finland	Marxilainen Työväenliito	Marxist Workers' League
Greece	Ergatiko Epanastatiko Komma	Workers' Revolutionary Party
Venezuela	Opción Obrera	Workers' Option
Uruguay	Partido de los Trabajadores	Workers' Party
United States	Workers Action	
