= Democracy & Nature =

Democracy & Nature : The International Journal of Inclusive Democracy
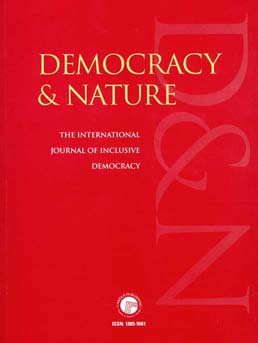
- Discipline: Political science
- Language: English
- Edited by: Takis Fotopoulos

Publication details
- Former name(s): Society & Nature
- History: 1992–2003
- Publisher: Aigis Publications (1992–1999); Routledge (1999–2003)
- Frequency: Triannual
- Open access: Yes

Standard abbreviations
- ISO 4: Democr. Nat.

Indexing
- ISSN: 1085-5661 (print); 1469-3720 (web)
- LCCN: 96640829
- OCLC no.: 33396638

Links
- Journal homepage; Online Archives

Democracy & Nature was a peer-reviewed academic journal of Politics established in 1992 by Takis Fotopoulos as Society and Nature, obtaining its later name in 1995. Four volumes of three issues each were released by Aigis Publications from 1992 to 1999. From 1999 to 2003, five more volumes were released by Routledge. Publication ceased at the end of 2003, after which Fotopoulos established a new journal, The International Journal of Inclusive Democracy.

== Political orientation ==
In the editorial of the first issue of the journal it is stated that the ambition of the journal would be "to initiate an urgently needed dialogue on the crucial question of developing a new liberatory social project, at a moment in History when the Left has abandoned this traditional role" and specified that the new project should be seen as the outcome of a synthesis of the democratic, libertarian socialist and radical Green traditions. It was out of this theoretical work and the dialogue which developed in the journal between 1992 and 1997 that the Inclusive Democracy project was born.

In September 1996, Murray Bookchin and his partner Janet Biehl resigned from the advisory board of the journal, citing deep disagreements with Takis Fotopoulos, particularly over what Bookchin regarded partiality towards Cornelius Castoriadis. The editorial board of the journal replied that "22 out of a total of 61 articles published so far have been explicitly expressing the movement of social ecology ... when the total number of articles published by Takis Fotopoulos (seven) and Castoriadis (three) are not more than the number of articles published by Murray alone, let alone the 12 additional articles expressing the 'line' of social ecology".

== Abstracting and indexing ==
The journal was abstracted and indexed in EBSCO databases (Alternative Press Index, Political Science Complete, and Academic Search Premier/Complete), International Political Science Abstracts and International Bibliography of the Social Sciences.
