= Communist Archio-Marxist Party of Greece =

Communist Archio-Marxist Party of Greece Κομμουνιστικό Αρχειομαρξιστικό Κόμμα Ελλάδας
- Abbreviation: KAKE
- Leader: Dimitris Giotopoulos
- Founded: 1934
- Dissolved: 1951
- Split from: Communist Bolshevik–Leninist Organization of Greece
- Ideology: Archeio-Marxism
- Political position: Left-wing

The Communist Archio-Marxist Party of Greece (Greek: Κομμουνιστικό Αρχειομαρξιστικό Κόμμα Ελλάδας, romanized: Kommounistikó Archeiomarxistikó Kómma Elládas; KAKE) (Note: The spelling Archeio-Marxist exists as well.) was a communist political party in Greece, active between 1934 and 1951. It belonged to a subvariant of Marxism–Leninism and Trotskyism known as Archeio-Marxism (Archive-Marxism), and was the last scion of that ideology, the sole Archio-Marxist remnant of the 1950s.

In 1947, the party was renamed to Archio-Marxist Party of Greece (Αρχειομαρξιστικό Κόμμα Ελλάδας, ΑΚΕ; AKE) or AKE. It was then renamed to Archio-Marxist Socialist Party of Greece (Αρχειομαρξιστικό Σοσιαλιστικό Κόμμα Ελλάδας, ΑΣΚΕ; ASKE) in 1951.

== History ==
Dimitris Giotopoulos, often known by his primary alias "Witte", was the leader of KAKE. Before its formation, he had been a leader of the Greek Archio-Marxists, which had been one of the by far largest dissident communist movements in Greece during the early-to-mid-1930s, as members of Leon Trotsky's International Left Opposition. KAKE split from Trotsky's movement in 1934 after significant ideological fallout.

It eventually joined the International Revolutionary Marxist Centre, known as the "London Bureau". The party participated in the 1936 Greek legislative election, with Har. Alexopoulos (Χαρ. Αλεξόπουλος) as its formal party leader, where it won 1,148 votes – roughly 0.1% of the vote. It failed to enter parliament. KAKE survived the dictatorship of General Ioannis Metaxas from 1936 onwards, although Giatopoulos, accused by Trotsky of manifesting "the worst principles of individualism and anarchism", ended up as a refugee abroad, for some time participating in the Spanish Civil War. During World War II and the later the Greek Civil War, KAKE feuded with the Communist Party of Greece (KKE) on matters of policy and theory. Many KAKE members were purged and executed by the Greek People's Liberation Army. It increasingly began to collaborate with the right-wing as a result, allying with the forces of anti-communism.

Its final activities came with the 1951 Greek legislative election, where it received likewise negative results as back in 1936, after which it promptly dissolved. After his return from French exile in the 1950s, the long-time leader Dimitris Giotopoulos became a collaborator of the right-wing regime, cooperating in anti-communist activities. His son Alexandros Giotopoulos, disillusioned with his father's anti-communism, became a notorious left-wing terrorist, active as an armed militant in the ranks of the 17 November terrorist group between 1969 and 2002.
