= Revolutionary Workers' Party (Turkey) =

Revolutionist Workers' Party Devrimci İşçi Partisi
- Abbreviation: DİP
- Chairman: Ömer Sungur Savran
- Founded: 15 June 2006
- Headquarters: Ankara
- Membership (2026): ▲52
- Ideology: Socialism; Trotskyism; Internationalism
- Political position: Far-left
- International affiliation: Coordinating Committee for the Refoundation of the Fourth International
- Colours: Red

Website
- https://gercekgazetesi1.net/

The Revolutionist Workers' Party (Turkish: Devrimci İşçi Partisi, DİP) is a Trotskyist and internationalist socialist political party in Turkey. DİP is a section of the Co-ordinating Committee for the Refoundation of the Fourth International.

In February 2014, the DIP conducted the political defence of one of its comrades in Antalya.

It held its conference in mid-2014 with delegates from other CRFI organisations.
