= Takis Fotopoulos =

Greek political philosopher, economist and writer

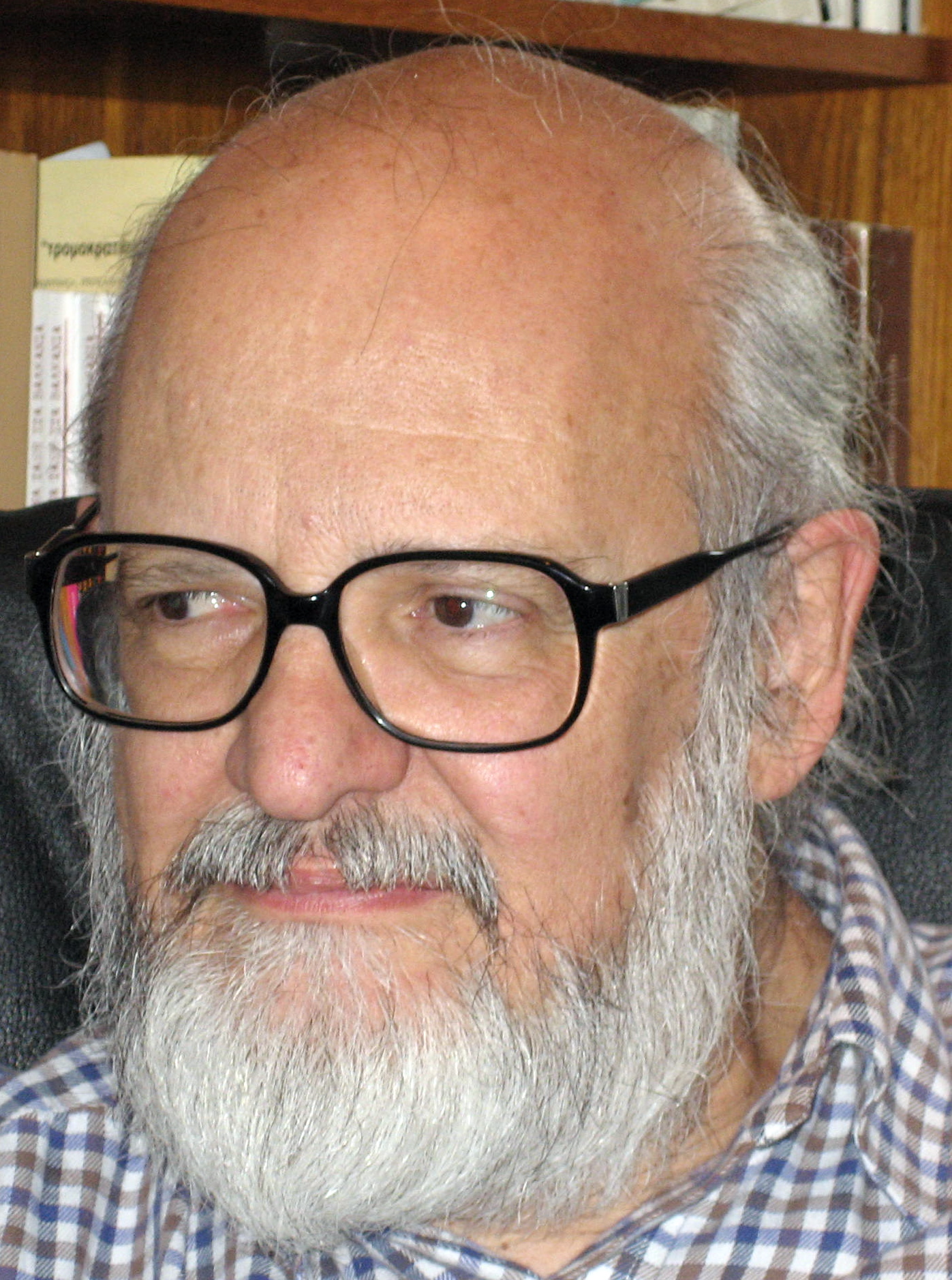
- Born: 14 October 1940 (age 85); Chios, Kingdom of Greece

Education
- Education: University of Athens; London School of Economics

Philosophical work
- Era: 20th-/21st-century philosophy
- Region: Western philosophy
- School: Libertarian socialism Founder of the Inclusive Democracy project
- Institutions: Polytechnic of North London
- Main interests: Political philosophy, international relations, social movements
- Notable ideas: Inclusive Democracy, the present multi-dimensional crisis, the transnational elite and its wars on terrorism, critique of left-wing politics

Takis Fotopoulos (Greek: Τάκης Φωτόπουλος; born 14 October 1940) is a Greek political philosopher, economist and writer who founded the Inclusive Democracy movement, aiming at a synthesis of classical democracy with libertarian socialism and the radical currents in the new social movements.

He is an academic, and has written many books and over 900 articles. He is the editor of The International Journal of Inclusive Democracy (which succeeded Democracy & Nature) and is the author of Towards An Inclusive Democracy (1997) in which the foundations of the Inclusive Democracy project were set. His latest book is The New World Order in Action: Volume 1: Globalization, the Brexit Revolution and the "Left"- Towards a Democratic Community of Sovereign Nations (December 2016). Fotopoulos is Greek and lives in London.

== Early life ==
Fotopoulos was born on the Greek island of Chios and his family moved to Athens soon afterwards. After graduating from the University of Athens with degrees in Economics and Political Science and in Law, he moved to London in 1966 for postgraduate study at the London School of Economics on a Varvaressos scholarship from Athens University. He was a student syndicalist and activist in Athens (Note: He was elected as a member of the Administrative Council of the Law students Union in 1958-59, following the first victory of a Left alliance in which he participated against EKOF, an extreme right wing student association controlled by the 'deep' Greek state, which a few years later, in 1963, was responsible for the murder of Left parliamentarian Grigoris Lambrakis and 4 years later of the military coup which led to the military dictatorship (1967-74).) and then a political activist in London, taking an active part in the 1968 student protests there, and in organisations of the revolutionary Greek Left during the struggle against the Greek military junta of 1967–1974. During this period, he was a member of the Greek group called Revolutionary Socialist Groups in London, which published the newspaper Μαμή ("Midwife", from the Marxian dictum, "violence is the midwife of revolution") for which he wrote several articles. Fotopoulos married Sia Mamareli (a former lawyer) in 1966; the couple have a son, Costas (born in 1974), who is a composer and pianist.

== Academia and afterwards ==
Fotopoulos was a Senior Lecturer in Economics at the Polytechnic of North London from 1969 to 1989, until he began editing the journal Society & Nature, later Democracy & Nature and subsequently the online International Journal of Inclusive Democracy. He was also a columnist of Eleftherotypia, the second-biggest newspaper in Greece.

== Inclusive Democracy ==
Fotopoulos developed the political project of Inclusive Democracy (ID) in 1997 (an exposition can be found in Towards An Inclusive Democracy). The first issue of Society & Nature declared that:

our ambition is to initiate an urgently needed dialogue on the crucial question of developing a new liberatory social project, at a moment in History when the Left has abandoned this traditional role.

It specified that the new project should be seen as the outcome of a synthesis of the democratic, libertarian socialist and radical Green traditions. Since then, a dialogue has followed in the pages of the journal, in which supporters of the autonomy project like Cornelius Castoriadis, social ecology supporters including its founder Murray Bookchin, and Green activists and academics like Steven Best have taken part.

The starting point for Fotopoulos' work is that the world faces a multi-dimensional crisis (economic, ecological, social, cultural and political) which is caused by the concentration of power in elites, as a result of the market economy, representative democracy and related forms of hierarchical structure. An inclusive democracy, which involves the equal distribution of power at all levels, is seen not as a utopia (in the negative sense of the word) or a "vision" but as perhaps the only way out of the present crisis, with trends towards its creation manifesting themselves today in many parts of the world. Fotopoulos is in favor of market abolitionism, although he would not identify himself as a market abolitionist as such because he considers market abolition as one aspect of an inclusive democracy which refers only to the economic democracy component of it. He maintains that "modern hierarchical society," which for him includes both the capitalist market economy and "socialist" statism, is highly oriented toward economic growth, which has glaring environmental contradictions. Fotopoulos proposes a model of economic democracy for a stateless, marketless and moneyless economy but he considers that the economic democracy component is equally significant to the other components of ID, i.e. political or direct democracy, economic democracy, ecological democracy and democracy in the social realm. Fotopoulos' work has been critically assessed by important activists, theorists and scholars.

== Selected bibliography ==
- Towards An Inclusive Democracy. The Crisis of the Growth Economy and the Need for a New Liberatory Project (London/New York: Cassell Continuum, 1997), 401 pp. ISBN 0-304-33627-0 and 0-304-33628-9.
- Education, Culture and Modernization, ed. by Peter Alheit et al. (Roskide University, 1995). (Takis Fotopoulos contribution: "The crisis of the growth economy, the withering away of the nation-state and the community-based society").
- Defending Public Schools, ed. by David A. Gabbard & E. Wayne Ross (Praeger, 2004). (Takis Fotopoulos contribution: "The State, the Market and (Mis-)education").
- Critical Perspectives on Globalisation, ed. by Robert Hunter Wade, Marina Della Giusta and Uma Kambhampati (Chelthenham, UK & Northampton, MA US: Edward Elgar publishing, 2006). (Takis Fotopoulos contribution: "The global 'war' of the transnational elite").
- Eco-socialism as Politics: Rebuilding the Basis of Our Modern Civilisation ed. by Qingzhi Huan (Springer, 1st Edition, 2010, XI), 224 p., Hardcover, ISBN 978-90-481-3744-2. (Takis Fotopoulos contribution: "The De-growth Utopia: The Incompatibility of De-growth within an Internationalised Market Economy").
- Academic Repression: Reflections from the Academic Industrial Complex ed. by A.J.Nocella, Steven Best, Peter McLaren (AK Press, Oakland, CA & Edinburgh, 2010), 590 p, paperback, ISBN 978-1-904859-98-7. (Takis Fotopoulos contribution: "Systemic Aspects of Academic Repression in the New World Order". A full version of this essay is published in The International Journal of Inclusive Democracy, Vol. 4, No. 4 (October 2008).
- Critical Pedagogy in the new dark ages: challenges and possibilities, ed by Maria Nikolakaki (Peter Lang Publishing, 2012), ISBN 978-1433114274. (Takis Fotopoulos contribution: "From (mis)education to Paedeia," pp. 81–119.)
- Karl Marx, The Communist Manifesto, ed by Frederic L. Bender (second revised edition; New York: W.W. Norton & Co, 2013), ISBN 978-0393935608. (Takis Fotopoulos & A. Gezerlis contribution: "Hardt & Negri's Empire: A new Communist Manifesto or a reformist Welcome to Neoliberal Globalization?," (extract), pp. 232–34.)
- The New World Order in Action. Vol. 1: Globalization, the Brexit Revolution and the 'Left' - Towards a Democratic Community of Sovereign Nations (San Diego, Cal., US: Progressive Press, 2016). ISBN 978-1615772476.

== See also ==
- Anarchist economics
