= Clara Gibson Maxwell =

American dancer and choreographer

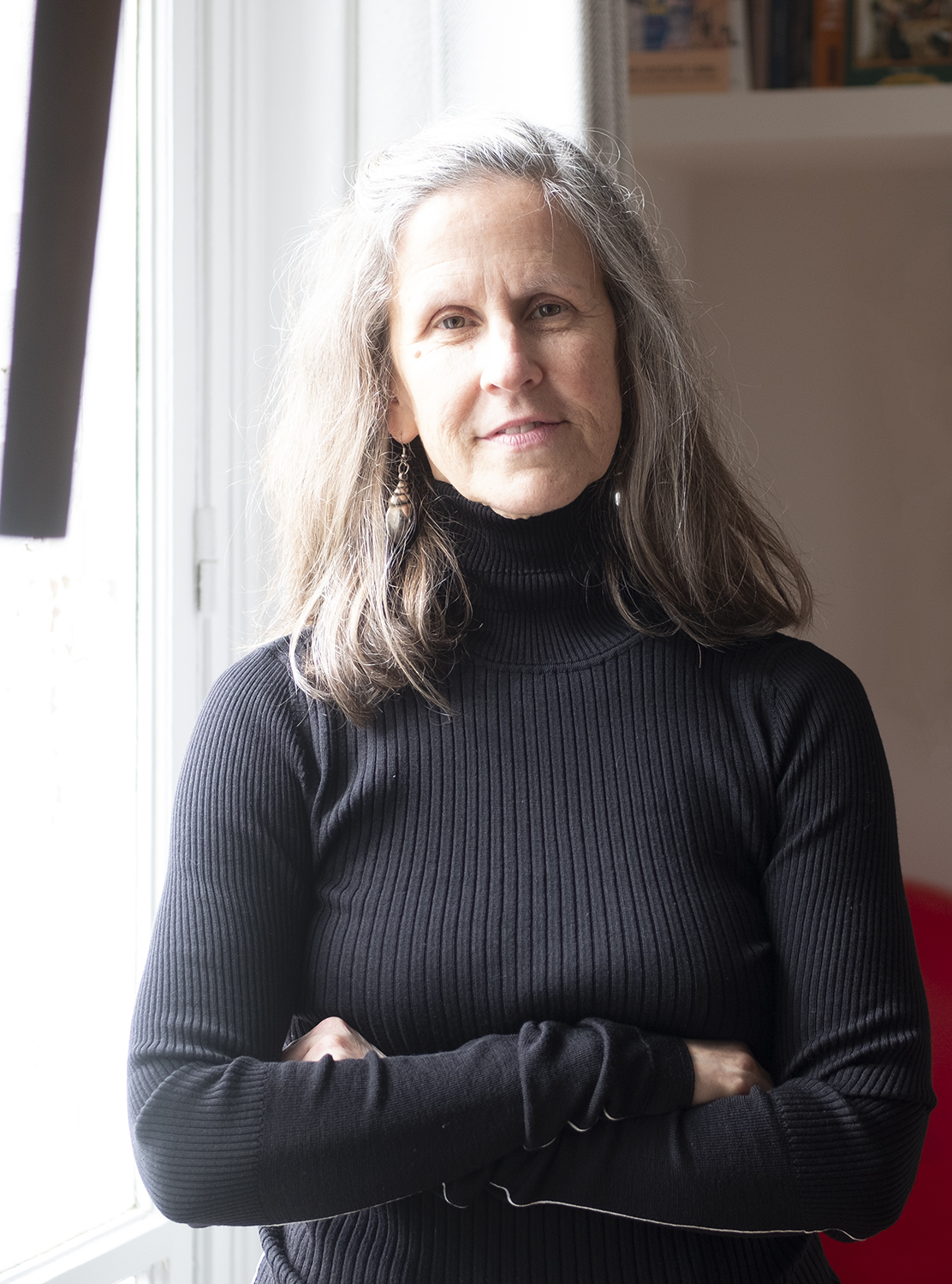
- Maxwell in 2024
- Born: 1958 (age 67–68); Clarksburg, West Virginia, US
- Education: Harvard University; Juilliard School (BFA in Dance, 1984)
- Occupations: Dancer, choreographer
- Years active: 1985–present
- Partner: David Ames Curtis
- Career
- Current group: Mon Oncle d'Amérique Productions
- Dances: Ophélie Song (1989), Cartesian Women (1994), Corpus (1998), The Banquet (2001), Encuentro-Encuentro (2011), Thoreau's Henhawk Visits Mexico (2021)

Clara Gibson Maxwell (born 1958) is an American dancer and choreographer living in Paris, France since 1985.

Her choreography first received public recognition in 1989 with Ophélie Song.

== Biography ==
=== Family ===
Clara Gibson Maxwell is a seventh-generation West Virginian. She was born in Clarksburg, the elder daughter of Frank Jarvis Maxwell Jr., a lawyer, judge and politician who was member of the West Virginia House of Delegates (1951–1956), County Clerk (1972–1984), and Circuit Court Judge (1984–1992) and Susan Cone Harnish, Professor of English literature. Her father's engagement in local politics and both parents' passion for the arts imprinted Maxwell's childhood.

=== Education ===
Maxwell studied Philosophy and Visual Arts (film and dance) at Harvard University from 1976–1978. She then trained at the Juilliard School and obtained a Bachelor of Fine Arts in Dance in 1984.

=== Civism ===
Maxwell has written about social and political affairs in her home state of West Virginia.

- "Should Clarksburg Build New Cultural Center or Renovate Rose Garden Theater?"
- "Don't be Penny-Wise, Pound Foolish with Our Future."

=== Philanthropy ===
Maxwell created the arts-educational Appalachian Springs Foundation (ASF) in 2015. The foundation espouses an egalitarian vision of the creative process, defined by parity of artistic elements and contributing participants in civic education, the performing and visual arts, somatic practices, and new music.

Among projects already sponsored by Appalachian Springs Foundation are the seminars of the Cátedra Interinstitucional Cornelius Castoriadis (Chiapas, Mexico), the Third Thursdays Harmolodic Concert Series (Cambridge, MA) and two Dave Bryant albums, Garden of Equilibria and Night Visitors, each named by jazz critics as one of the ten-best jazz albums of the years 2015 and 2020, respectively. Appalachian Springs Foundation also supported Anagram, an experimental film by Nathaniel Draper and In Vain, Anastasia Melia Eleftheriou's "poetic cinema" project.

== Choreography ==
=== Major influences ===
Alexander Technique, the apprenticeship of efficient movement through self-knowledge guided by a somatic practitioner, provided a framework for Maxwell's evolution from Harvard philosophy student to Juilliard School dance professional. Maxwell's own private Alexander Technique practice thrived in Paris between 1999 and 2009.

At Juilliard, the teachers Anna Sokolow, a major figure of the American modern dance tradition, and the German expressionist Hanya Holm marked her future as dancer and choreographer. Additional mentoring was found at The First Zen Institute of America, from Antony Tudor, the British inventor of “psychological” ballet and choreographer at Juilliard. In Paris, Maxwell's art acquired texture through dialogues with the Greek-French philosopher of the imagination Cornelius Castoriadis and American jazz saxophonist and composer Ornette Coleman.

=== Dialogues ===
The specificity of Maxwell's contribution to Dance stems from her connecting dance to philosophy with Cartesian Women (Descartes) in 1995, Corps Eros (Hesiod) in 1997 and Thoreau's Henhawk Visits Mexico in 2017 and 2021.

Her relationship to music is jazz and improvisation inspired. Maxwell's dances extend Ornette Coleman's harmolodics (improvisation in which melody, rhythm and harmony have equal value) to choreography, thanks to a collaboration with the Pulitzer Prize winning composer begun in 1990.

Maxwell's track record of site-responsive choreography includes Corpus in 1998 at the Convent of Sainte Marie de La Tourette in L'Arbresle (Le Corbusier) and the Banquet in 2001 at Taliesin West, headquarters of the Frank Lloyd Wright Foundation, where she was resident artist and teacher for The Taliesin Fellowship.
