= Archeio-Marxism =

Archeio-Marxism (Greek: αρχειομαρξισμός) was a radical left political movement active during the interwar period in Greece, mainly from 1921 to 1934. The main motto of its supporters was "first education and then action" ("πρώτα μόρφωση μετά δράση"), and until 1926 they were against mass demonstrations and unionism.

They were named after the Archive of Marxism (Αρχείον Μαρξισμού) magazine, which was published in 1923–1925 (Note: Its publication was interrupted by the 1925 Greek coup d'état.) and then in 1927–1928.

== History ==
=== Foundation, 1921–1929 ===
In 1921, a political movement emerged within SEKE (the precursor of KKE) under the leadership of Frangiskos Tzoulatis (one of the co-founders of the Socialist Youth of Athens). This movement, called the First Core (Πρώτος Πυρήνας), acquired a specific structure and objectives during the period 1922–1923. In April 1924, the First Core group was expelled from SEKE. In 1926, Tzoulatis would resign from the leadership of the movement to cede his position to Dimitris Giotopoulos, despite the fact that the latter had not participated in the formation of the First Core. In 1929, Giotopoulos played a leading role in the creation of the Archeio-Marxist organization Union of Communist Internationalists – EKD (Ένωση Κομμουνιστών Διεθνιστών, ΕΚΔ).

=== KOMLEA, 1929–1934 ===
From 1929 to 1934, the organization was a member of Leon Trotsky's International Left Opposition (ILO), renaming itself in 1930 as the Communist Bolshevik–Leninist Organization of Greece – Archeio-Marxists – KOMLEA (Κομμουνιστική Οργάνωση Μπολσεβίκων Λενινιστών Ελλάδας – Αρχειομαρξιστών, ΚΟΜΛΕΑ). With some 2,000 members, it constituted the ILO's largest member group, and its leader, Giotopoulos (alias: "Witte"), occupied an important position as its general secretary.

In 1930, a group led by Michel Pablo split from KOMLEA and formed the Communist Unification Group (KEO), which had Trotskyist leanings and renounced Archeio-Marxism. KEO, after failing to merge with Spartacus League (led by Pandelis Pouliopoulos), was renamed in 1932—following the involvement of Agis Stinas, who had been expelled from the KKE—to LAKKE. In 1933, Stinas left the group, and in 1934, LAKKE merged with Spartacus to form the Organisation of Internationalist Communists of Greece (OKDE).

=== Dissolution and aftermath of KOMLEA, 1934–1951 ===
Following Giotopoulos' quarrel with Trotsky in 1934, the Archeio-Marxists left the ILO. By the late 1930s, the group became affiliated with the so-called "London Bureau" (a centrist Marxist organization), having formed the Communist Archeio-Marxist Party of Greece – KAKE (created in 1934 and dissolved in 1951). The organization survived the repression of the Metaxas Regime, but its members came under increasing attack from both right-wing groups and the KKE-led EAM-ELAS resistance front at the end of World War II and during the Greek Civil War.

Another party that emerged as a result of the dissolution of KOMLEA in 1934 was the Bolshevik–Leninist Organization of Greece – OMLE (Οργάνωση Μπολσεβίκων Λενινιστών Ελλάδας, ΟΜΛΕ; also known as the "Bolsevikos" group and led by actor Giorgis Vitsoris), which sided with Trotskyism. The group split one year later into Neos Dromos (Νέος Δρόμος, 1935–1937; led by Loukas Karliaftis a.k.a. "Kostas Kastritis") and the Communist Internationalist Union of Greece – KDEE (Κομμουνιστική Διεθνιστική Ένωση Ελλάδας, ΚΔΕΕ, 1935–1942; led by Vitsoris). In 1937, Neos Dromos merged with OKDE to form the United OKDE (EOKDE, 1937–1942). Vitsoris represented KDEE and Pablo represented EOKDE at the founding conference of the Fourth International in September 1938. The two Trotskyist organizations, EOKDE and KDEE, made an unsuccessful attempt to unite in 1939. In July 1946, during the Unification Congress of the Greek Trotskyist groups, EDKE (formerly EOKDE) and Stinas' DEKE were merged into KDKE.

== Sources ==
- (in Greek) ΣΠΑΡΤΑΚΟΣ, Κείμενα 1930-1932 - Εκδόσεις «Ουτοπία», Αθήνα, Δεκέμβρης 1986
- Alexander, Robert Jackson (1991). International Trotskyism, 1929-1985: A Documented Analysis of the Movement. Duke University Press. pp. 500–503. ISBN 978-0-8223-1066-2.
