= Theofylaktos Papakonstantinou =

Greek journalist (1905–1991)

Theofylaktos Papakonstantinou (Θεοφύλακτος Παπακωνσταντίνου; 1905–1991) was a Greek columnist, political and social analyst and historian. He used the pen name Petros Monastiriotis (Πέτρος Μοναστηριώτης).

== Biography ==
He was born in 1905 in Monastir, then part of the Ottoman Empire (modern Bitola, North Macedonia), hence his later pen name. He studied literature, philosophy, history and didactics at the University of Athens.

He was an author in the Great Greek Encyclopedia (Μεγάλη Ελληνική Εγκυκλοπαίδεια) (1928–1934), author of newspaper Anexartitos (1934–1936), author and managing editor of the Proïa newspaper (1936–1943). He was also a war correspondent in 1941.

During the Axis occupation of Greece, he edited with some of his colleagues the Machomeni Ellas ("Fighting Greece") newspaper on behalf of the Greek Resistance (August 1942 – October 1943). This newspaper was also delivered to the forces of the Greek government in exile in the Middle East. In October 1943, Papakonstantinou himself escaped to the Middle East (Cairo), as he was about to be arrested by the German occupation authorities. He then served as Director of Press for the exiled Greek government (1943–44).

He returned after Greece's liberation in October 1944, and became briefly the General Director of Internal Press. He then became managing editor and columnist of Eleftheria (1945–1949), a columnist in the Mesimvrini newspaper (1963–1967), and contributor to many magazines and to the National Radio Foundation, (1950–1953 and 1959–1964). The Greek military junta appointed him Vice Minister of State (1967) and then Minister of Education (1967–1969). He resigned on 5 April 1969, when it was clear that there would be no elections as the military government had promised. He compiled a handbook on Civic Education (Πολιτική Αγωγή) in 1970, which was used in a shortened form as a textbook in schools. The 2 million drachmas he received as royalties he donated to the state.

In 1972–1985, he was a columnist in the Akropolis newspaper. In 1987 he published the autobiographical memoirs The Great Adventure (Η Μεγάλη Περιπέτεια), complemented later by The Small Adventure (Η Μικρή Περιπέτεια). He died on 31 March 1991 in Athens.

Throughout his career, he wrote 7,576 articles amounting to 21,600 pages. He also translated into Greek books of Karl Marx, Sigmund Freud, Charles Gide, Sidney Hook and others. He was honoured with the award of the Academy of Athens for his book Anatomy of the Revolution (Ανατομία της Επαναστάσεως), with the Commander's Cross of the Order of the Phoenix, with the Grand Commander's Cross of the Order of George I, and with awards by the Greek Orthodox patriarchates of Jerusalem and Alexandria.
