= Nomos (sociology) =

Social custom

In sociology, nomos (plural: nomoi) is a habit or custom of social and political behavior that is socially constructed and historically specific. It refers not only to explicit laws but to all of the normal rules and forms people take for granted in their daily activities. Because it represents order that is validated by and binding on those who fall under its jurisdiction, it is a social construct with ethical dimensions.

== Background ==
Nomos was an Ancient Greek term that was used for a broad range of societal or socio-political norms or laws in the city-states (poleis) of that time. This was the basis for the literary claims that Hellenes were different or morally superior to the "warlike" and "bloodthirsty" tribes of the Thracians, who were accused of intemperate drunkenness, immorality and uninhibited sexuality.

== Carl Schmitt ==
Carl Schmitt began using the term in his 1934 publication On the Three Types of Juristic Thought to denote the "concrete order" of a people. He later extended its use into his 1950 book The Nomos of the Earth in the International Law of the Jus Publicum Europaeum.

== Peter L. Berger ==
After Schmitt, the next influential writer to use the term in a modern context is Peter L. Berger. Berger writes of human beings fashioning a world by their own activity. Berger sees this taking place through a continual threefold cycle between individuals and society: externalisation, objectivation, and internalization.

The world thus fashioned has an order—a set of principles—which comes to be read on to society by individuals through externalisation and objectivation, and also internalised in each individual. This order thus comes to be assumed, spoken of, and placed into social discourse to be treated as common sense. This ordering of the world and experience, which is a corporate and social process as well as an individual one, is a nomos.

Berger writes of the "socially established nomos" being understood "as a shield against terror;" in other words, "the most important function of society is nomization." We all need this structuring nomos: it provides us with stability and predictability; a frame of reference in which to live. The alternative is the chaos and terror of what Berger calls anomie.

To be most effective, the nomos must be taken for granted. The structure of the world created by human and social activity is treated not as contingent, but as self-evident:

Whenever the socially established nomos attains the quality of being taken for granted, there occurs a merging of its meanings with what are considered to be the fundamental meanings inherent in the universe.

Berger sees this happening in all societies; while in "archaic societies" the nomos is expressed in religious terms, "in contemporary society, this archaic cosmization of the social world is likely to take the form of 'scientific' propositions about the nature of men rather than the nature of the universe." Therefore, while its expression has most often been religious, this process of world-construction is not necessarily religious in itself. Later, Berger explores the part that religious belief has played in nomoi: it provides a connection with the cosmic, seeking to provide a completeness to that religious world-view.

Every human society is an edifice of externalized and objectivated meanings, always intending a meaningful totality. Every society is engaged in the never completed enterprise of building a humanly meaningful world. Cosmization implies the identification of this humanly meaningful world with the world as such, the former now being grounded in the latter, reflecting it or being derived from it in its fundamental structures. Such a cosmos, as the ultimate ground and validation of human nomoi, need not necessarily be sacred. Particularly in modern times there have been thoroughly secular attempts at cosmization, among which modern science is by far the most important. It is safe to say, however, that originally all cosmization had a sacred character.

== Robert Cover ==
The next landmark in the use of the term is generally thought to be by Robert Cover in his influential 1982 paper "Nomos and Narrative". His use of the term is rooted in Berger's argument that nomos requires mythology and narrative, as pillars for the understanding of the meaning of each act within a particular nomos.

Cover argues that, while the mechanisms of law and social control are part of law, students of the law, and legal actors, should instead focus on the normative universe, the whole of the means of social control. As with Berger, Cover roots the nomos in "narrative," or what a post-structuralist would call meta-narrative. Cover argues that no set of legal institutions exists apart from the narratives that locate it and give it meaning.

He argues that this is due to the fact that our moral sense is composed of the narratives from which we draw conclusions, and by which we locate ourselves in relation to other people. Because narrative is morality, the normative universe must rest on narrative. Since we also construct our view of the universe physically from narrative, Cover argues that the normative universe is as much a part of our existence as the physical universe.

Cover then makes an argument of incorporation: just as we develop increasingly complex responses to the physical world, so too is our development of responses to "otherness" conditioned over time by interaction. From this, he argues that societies that have great legal systems rest on more than formal and technical virtuosity, but in the richness of their understanding of the normative universe.

He argues that the explicit relationship between formal apparatus of a society, in this case a legal society, and the normative range of behavior is the fulcrum to understanding whether the society is functional or not.
