= Organisation of Internationalist Communists of Greece =

Organisation of Internationalist Communists of Greece Οργάνωση Κομμουνιστών Διεθνιστών Ελλάδας
- Founded: 1934; refounded in 1974
- Ideology: Communism; Marxism; Trotskyism
- Political position: Far-left

Party flag
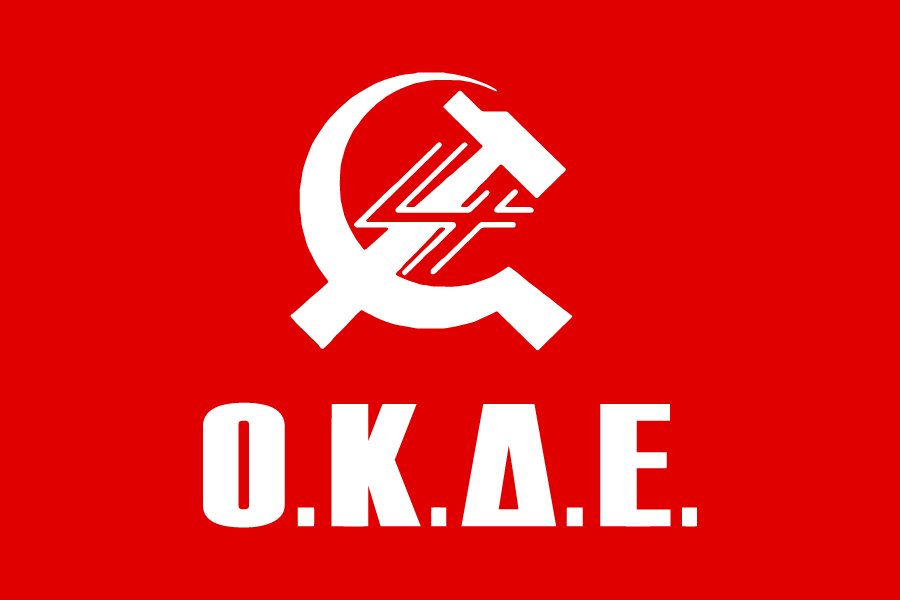

Website
- okde.gr

The Organization of Internationalist Communists of Greece (Greek: Οργάνωση Κομμουνιστών Διεθνιστών Ελλάδας, Organosi Kommouniston Diethniston Elladas) is a Greek Trotskyist political party. It is also known by its acronym OKDE (ΟΚΔΕ).

== History ==
The historical roots of OKDE can be traced to the Left Opposition of the Communist Party of Greece around Pandelis Pouliopoulos and Pastias Giatsopoulos, which was expelled at the Third Regular Congress of the party in 1928. Originally, the expelled did not consider themselves to be a different movement to the Communist Party, nor did they seek to found a new political group; rather, their main goal was to return to the Party in order to, in their view, restore its original Leninist principles. This changed, however, in 1934, when all the communist parties in Nazi Germany were outlawed with the rise of National Socialism. Pouliopoulos and Giatsopoulos considered that the Communist Party of Greece had now abandoned its original position that the Stalinist communist parties and the Third International could apply revolutionary Marxism in Greece. Thus, in 1934, the Spartacus League (Σπάρτακος; led by Pouliopoulos) and the (Trotskyist group) Leninist Opposition to the KKE – LAKKE (Λενινιστική Αντιπολίτευση του ΚΚΕ, ΛΑΚΚΕ; previously called KEO and led by Michel Pablo until 1933) were united and formed OKDE.

In 1937, on the initiative of Pouliopoulos, Neos Dromos merged with OKDE to briefly form the United OKDE (Ενιαία ΟΚΔΕ, ΕΟΚΔΕ; EOKDE, 1937–1942). In September 1938, Pablo represented Pouliopoulos's EOKDE at the founding conference of the Fourth International.

In May 1943, the majority of the EOKDE founded the Party of Internationalist Communists of Greece (Κόμμα Κομμουνιστών Διεθνιστών Ελλάδας, ΚΚΔΕ; KKDE), which in 1945 participated in the founding of the Workers' Internationalist Party of Greece (Εργατικό Διεθνιστικό Κόμμα Ελλάδας, ΕΔΚΕ; EDKE). In July 1946, EDKE and Agis Stinas' DEKE were merged into KDKE.

KDKE was dissolved in 1967 (when the Regime of the Colonels came to power) and was refounded in 1974 as OKDE.

In 1985, some members of OKDE left the party and formed the Organization of Communist Internationalists of Greece–Spartacus.

OKDE supported the Radical Left Front at the 2007 legislative elections. In the 2010 local elections, the party elected one municipal councillor at the Ampelokipoi-Menemeni municipality. In 2012, the party participated at the May legislative elections, where it received the 0.03% of the vote.

== Election results ==
=== Hellenic Parliament ===
Election	Hellenic Parliament					Rank	Government	Leader
Election	Votes	%	±pp	Seats won	+/−	Rank	Government	Leader
May 2012	1,783	0.03%	New	0 / 300	New	25th	Extra-parliamentary	Collective leadership
Jun 2012	Did not contest			0 / 300	0	—N/a	Extra-parliamentary	Collective leadership
Jan 2015	1,854	0.03%	±0.00	0 / 300	0	18th	Extra-parliamentary	Collective leadership
Sep 2015	2,433	0.04%	+0.01	0 / 300	0	18th	Extra-parliamentary	Collective leadership
2019	1,576	0.03%	–0.01	0 / 300	0	18th	Extra-parliamentary	Collective leadership
May 2023	1,950	0.03%	±0.00	0 / 300	0	30th	Extra-parliamentary	Collective leadership
Jun 2023	1,379	0.03%	±0.00	0 / 300	0	23rd	Extra-parliamentary	Collective leadership

=== European Parliament ===
European Parliament
Election	Votes	%	±pp	Seats won	+/−	Rank	Leader	EP Group
2014	3,045	0.05	New	0 / 21	New	38th	Collective Leadership	−
2019	4,803	0.08	+0.03	0 / 21	0	38th	Collective Leadership	−
2024	1,973	0.05	−0.03	0 / 21	0	29th	Collective Leadership	−
