= Savas Matsas =

Savas Mihail Matsas (or Savas Michael Matsas or Savas Michael-Matsas; Greek: Σάββας Μιχαήλ Μάτσας; born Sabetai Benaki Matsas (Σαμπετάι Μπενάκη Μάτσας), 1947, Athens) is a Greek Jewish intellectual, leader of the Workers Revolutionary Party (Greece). He is an antizionist and internationalist author of a considerable work of culture about literature, philosophy, religion and class struggle.

== Prosecution ==
In 2009, the far-right Golden Dawn party filed, before the Greek justice, many documents against several left-wing Greek authors. The police wanted to interrogate all of them, but they jointly agreed not to appear in court and jointly signed a document stating they legally rejected the accusations. After reviewing the documentation, two of them were brought to justice by the Attorney General: Savas Matsas and Constantin Motzouri, the former rector of the National Technical University of Athens. There was an international petition in his defence. His party (EEK) called for the "smashing of fascism" which could be interpreted as a calling for an attack on nationalist demonstrators or more specifically, Golden Dawn. He admitted it himself that "The Greek left organized a number of antifascist demonstrations in which our party also participated in" https://linksunten.indymedia.org/de/node/91006/)

On 4 September 2013, an Athens court acquitted Matsas and Moutzouris of all charges.

== Works ==
- Figures du Messianique (1999) (a compilation of essays published in that year)
- Golem: A propos du sujet et d'autres fantômes (2010)
