= Marxist Workers' League (Finland) =

The Marxist Workers League is a Trotskyist organization in Finland.

It was previously affiliated with the Committee For a Workers' International, it is now affiliated with the Coordinating Committee for the Refoundation of the Fourth International.
