= Workers Revolutionary Party (Greece) =

Workers Revolutionary Party Εργατικό Επαναστατικό Κόμμα
- Leader: Savas Matsas
- Founded: 1963 (as EDE); 1985 (as EEK)
- Headquarters: Kapodistriou 38, 10431 Athens, Greece
- Ideology: Communism; Trotskyism; Euroscepticism; Anti-imperialism
- Political position: Far-left
- International affiliation: CRFI
- Colours: Red

Party flag
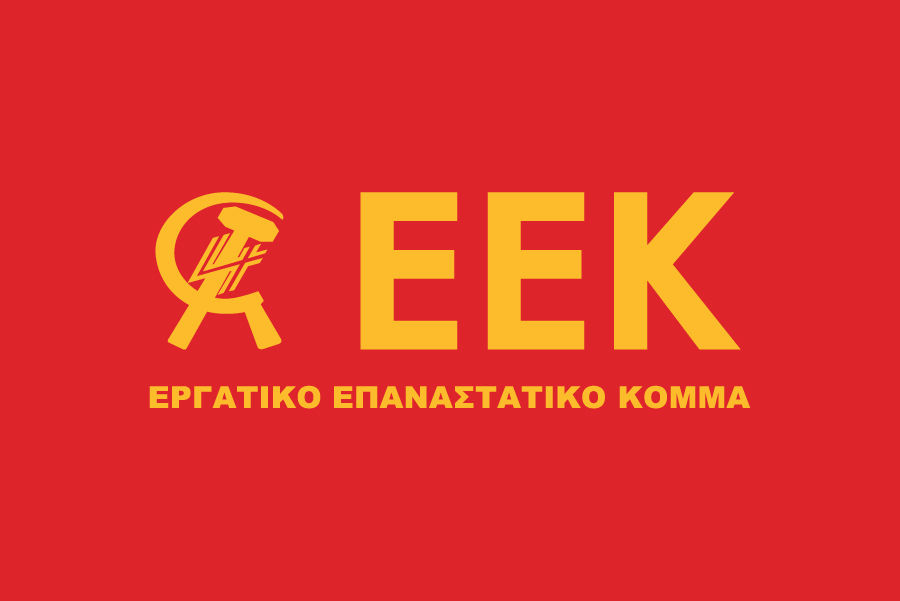

Website
- neaprooptiki.gr

The Workers Revolutionary Party (Greek: Εργατικό Επαναστατικό Κόμμα (ΕΕΚ), Ergatiko Epanastatiko Komma, EEK) is a Trotskyist communist political party in Greece, taking part in the elections independently, since the departure from Radical Left Front (MERA, ΜΕΡΑ) coalition in spring of 2009. EEK does some cooperative work with the Front of the Greek Anticapitalist Left (ANTARSYA), which the rest of MERA joined in 2009.

The party's newspaper is Νέα Προοπτική (Nea Prooptiki, New Perspective). Another of its publications is Επαναστατική Μαρξιστική Επιθεώρηση (Epanastatiki Marxistiki Epitheorisi, Revolutionary Marxist Review), a theoretical magazine. EEK also publishes classic Marxist writings.

Its youth section is OEN (Οργάνωση Επαναστατικής Νεολαίας, Organisation of Revolutionary Youth). OEN's monthly magazine is Konservokouti (Κονσερβοκούτι, Tincan), a title deliberately ridiculing far-right propaganda that used to claim for decades that the Left used tincans to cut their opponents' throat through the Greek Civil War.

The party concluded its 10th Congress in October 2008. EEK's General Secretary is the prominent Trotskyist Savas Mihail Matsas, former secretary of the International Committee of the Fourth International.

EEK is the Greek Section of the Coordinating Committee for the Refoundation of the Fourth International.

== History ==
ΕΕΚ's history goes back to 1963.

The internal crisis of the Fourth International was followed in 1958 by a crisis inside its Greek section, KDKE (ΚΔΚΕ – Κομμουνιστικό Διεθνιστικό Κόμμα Ελλάδας, Kommounistiko Diethnistiko Komma Elladas, Communist Internationalist Party of Greece, 1946–1967), which, in its original form, had been founded in 1942 by Agis Stinas—KDKE was previously known as Occupation-era KDKE (1942), DKKE (Note: Διεθνιστικό Κομμουνιστικό Κόμμα Ελλάδας, ΔΚΚΕ) (Internationalist Communist Party of Greece, 1943), and DEKE (Note: Διεθνιστικό Επαναστατικό Κόμμα Ελλάδας, ΔΕΚΕ) (Internationalist Revolutionary Party of Greece, 1944) and finally renamed "KDKE" in 1946, after unifying with EDKE.

The 1950s crisis within KDKE caused the departure of many members that rejected Pabloist entrism (those opposing entrism would later join EEK). Among them were Trotskyist revolutionaries that were legends for the Greek movement since the 1920s, such as Loukas Karliaftis (1905–2003) a.k.a. "Kostas Kastritis" (leader of KDKE from 1947 to 1957). Furthermore, there were many youth industrial workers who created, along with other mechanics, a struggling workers organization and published the magazine O Μηχανουργός (The Mechanic).

This group's successes were many, gaining power and control inside many workers' unions against Stalinism. In 1963, they eventually created Syndicalist Union – Workers' Vanguard (Συνδικαλιστική Παράταξη – Εργατική Πρωτοπορία). That was the legal title of the organization, due to Law 509 that prosecuted for high treason any organization that fought openly against the regime. The real, but illegal, title was EDE (ΕΔΕ – Εργατική Διεθνιστική Ένωση, Ergatiki Diethnistiki Enosi, Workers Internationalist Union).

The newborn organization published the magazine Ο Διεθνιστής (The Internationalist) and soon started to play a significant role in the class war in Greece. They struggled inside the unions and participated in any fight, such as the riot of July 1965. From the first moment, EDE sought contact and connected with the International Committee of the Fourth International (ICFI).

The 1967 Regime of the Colonels dealt a severe blow to EDE. Many members were arrested, imprisoned, and tortured, but the organization never stopped fighting against the dictators illegally through publications, propaganda, and by participating in the student revolt of November 1973. Others managed to escape abroad to European countries, where they continued the struggle. The fall of the junta in 1974 found EDE reorganized with an increase in numbers and structures. EDE published Σοσιαλιστική Αλλαγή (Socialist Change) twice a week. EDE's youth section was the Young Socialists.

In 1985, EDE transformed into a Leninist party, under its current name, EEK. In 1989, the EEK left the ICFI.

The party's position on the 2008 civil unrest in Greece was that it was a revolt.

== Electoral results ==
Results since 2009 (year links to election page)
Year	Type of Election	Votes	%	Mandates
2009	European	6,048	0.12	0
2009	Legislative	4,536	0.07	0
May 2012	Legislative	6,095	0.10	0
June 2012	Legislative	Urged vote for ANTARSYA		
January 2015	Legislative	2,441	0.04	0
September 2015	Legislative	45,937^{1}	0.85	0
July 2019	Legislative	1,993	0.04	0

^{1} Participated in coalition with ANTARSYA.
