= Acronauplia =

Neighborhood of Nafplio, Greece

Coordinates: 37°33′50″N 22°47′43″E

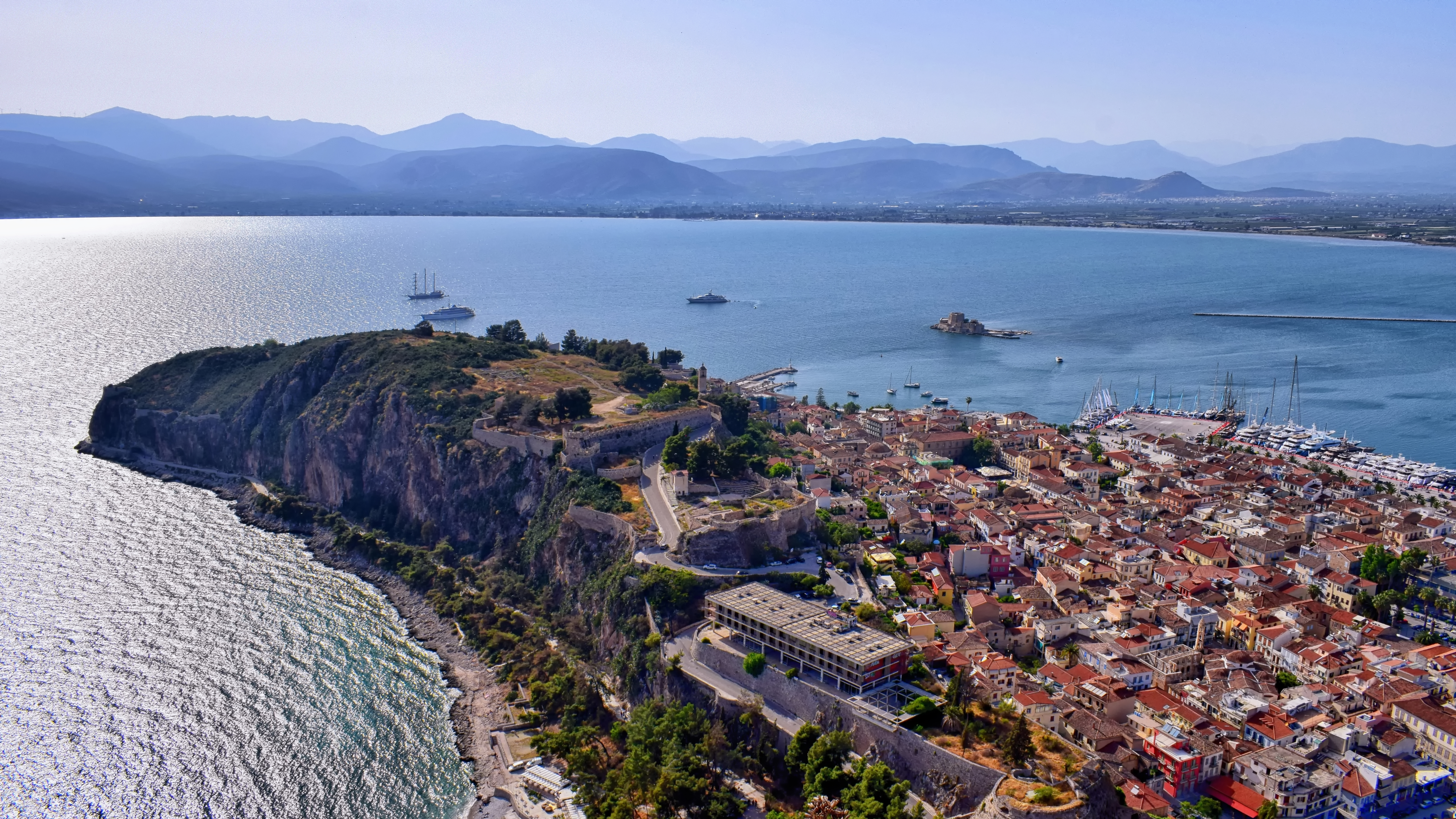
View from Palamidi to Acronauplia

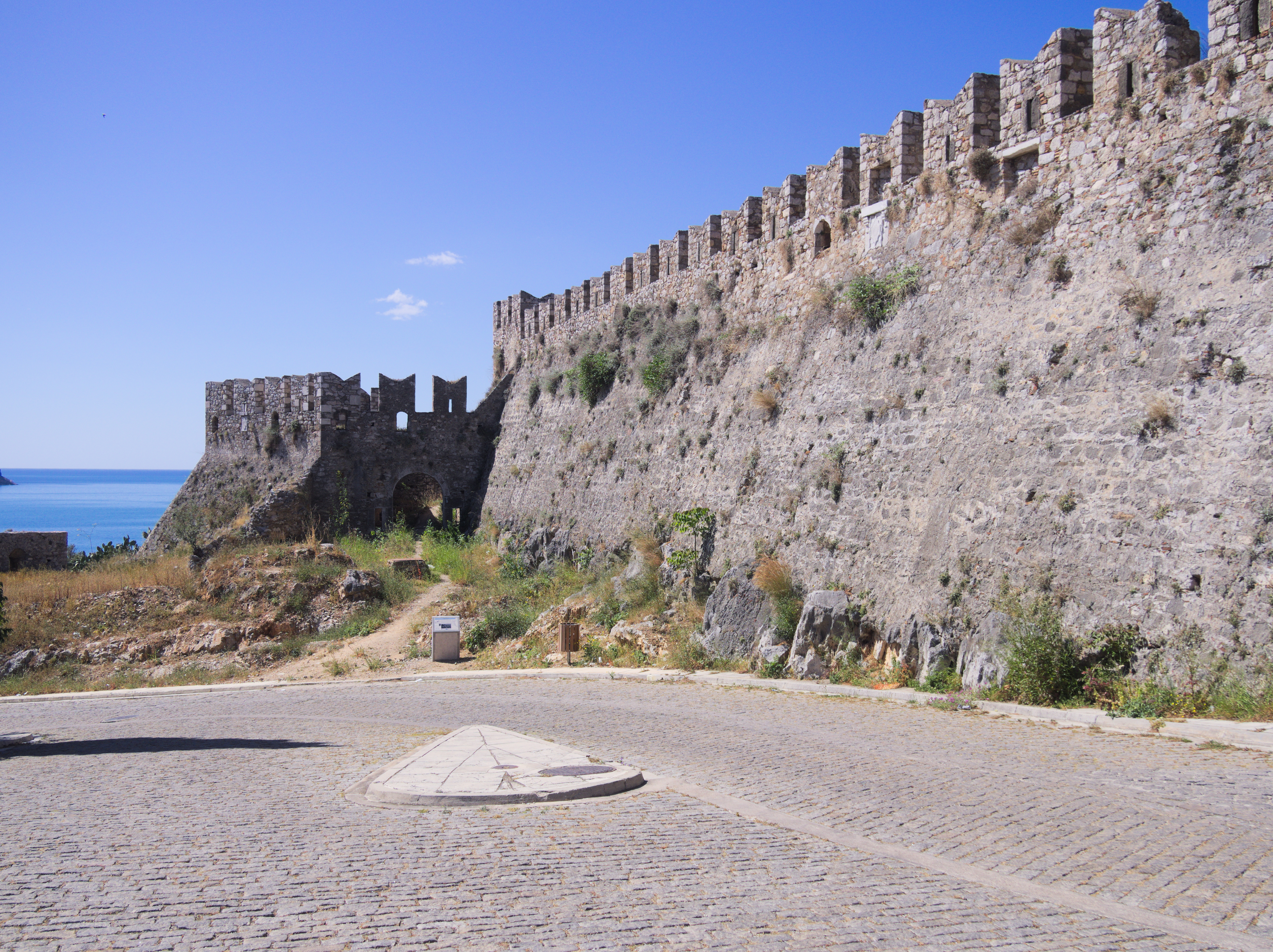
Part of the fortifications in Acronauplia

The Acronauplia (Greek: Ακροναυπλία, romanized: Akronafplia; Turkish: Iç Kale, "Inner Castle") is the oldest part of the city of Nafplion in Greece. Until the thirteenth century, it was a town on its own. The arrival of the Venetians and the Franks transformed it into part of the town fortifications. Later, part of it was used as a prison until the Greek government decided that the view provided from its location would benefit the local tourism and built a hotel complex which still stands there today.
