= Yiannis Boutaris =

Greek businessman and politician (1942–2024)

- Γιάννης Μπουτάρης
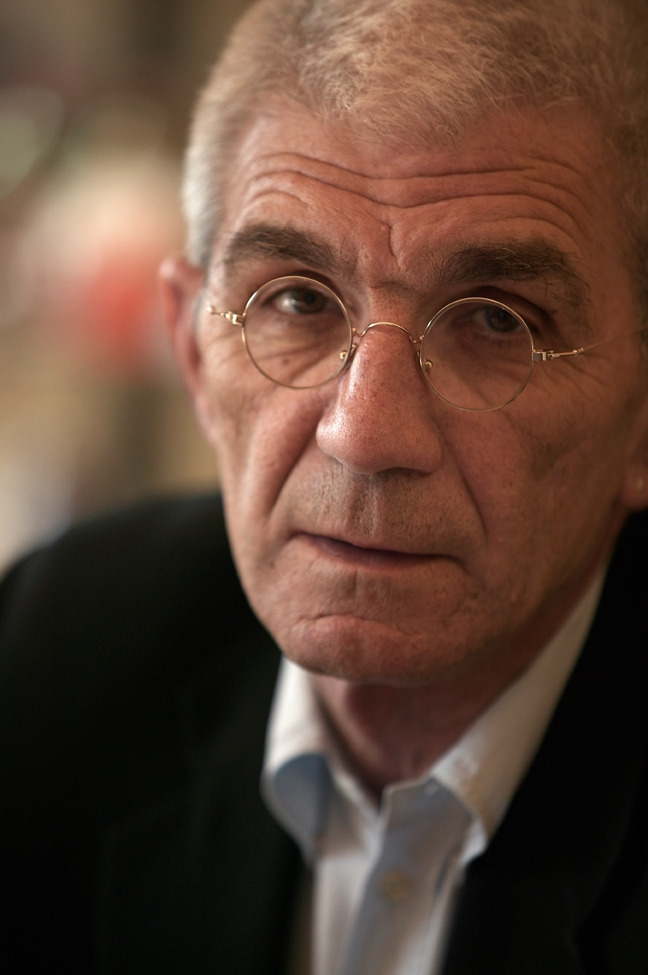
- Boutaris in 2005

60th Mayor of Thessaloniki
- In office 1 January 2011 – 31 August 2019
- Deputy: See list: Konstantinos Zervas (2013–2015); Nikos Fotiou (2018–2019)
- Preceded by: Vasilis Papageorgopoulos
- Succeeded by: Konstantinos Zervas

Municipal Councilor of Thessaloniki
- In office 1 January 2024 – 9 November 2024
- In office 1 January 2003 – 1 January 2011

Personal details
- Born: 13 June 1942 Thessaloniki, Greece
- Died: 9 November 2024 (aged 82) Thessaloniki, Greece
- Party: PASOK
- Spouse: Athina Mixail (m. 1964; died 2007)
- Children: 3
- Education: Aristotle University of Thessaloniki; Wine Institute of Athens
- Profession: Politician; Winemaker

Yiannis Boutaris (Greek: Γιάννης Μπουτάρης; 13 June 1942 – 9 November 2024) was a Greek winemaker and politician who served as the 60th Mayor of Thessaloniki from 2011 to 2019. From 2003 tο 2011 he served as a municipal councilor of Thessaloniki, a position he held again from January to November 2024.

== Early life and education ==
Boutaris was born in Thessaloniki on 13 June 1942, as son of the winemaker Stelios Boutaris and Fanny Vlachos. His parents were of Aromanian background. His mother's family, the Nichota family, has its roots in the town of Kruševo, now in North Macedonia, while his father's family originates from the town of Vithkuq, now in Albania.

His primary education was at the Experimental elementary school of the Aristotle University of Thessaloniki, his secondary education at Anatolia College, and he graduated in chemistry from the Aristotle University of Thessaloniki in 1965 and in oenology from the Wine Institute of Athens in 1967. In his youth he was associated with the Communist Party of Greece (KKE).

From 1969 to 1996 he worked for the family wine company Boutari, based in Naoussa. He left the family company to create the Kir-Yianni wine company, based on two estates in abandoned village of Giannakochori and in Amyntaio, in 1998.

== Political career ==
Boutaris was elected as municipal councilor of Thessaloniki in 2003, He ran for mayor of Thessaloniki in 2006 and placed third. He was elected mayor in 2010 by a razor-thin margin, ending 24 years of rule by hardline conservative mayors. He was reelected with 58% of the vote in 2014. During the 2010s he was one of the prominent figures of progressive views and politics in Greece as well as a founding member of the ecological organization Arcturos.

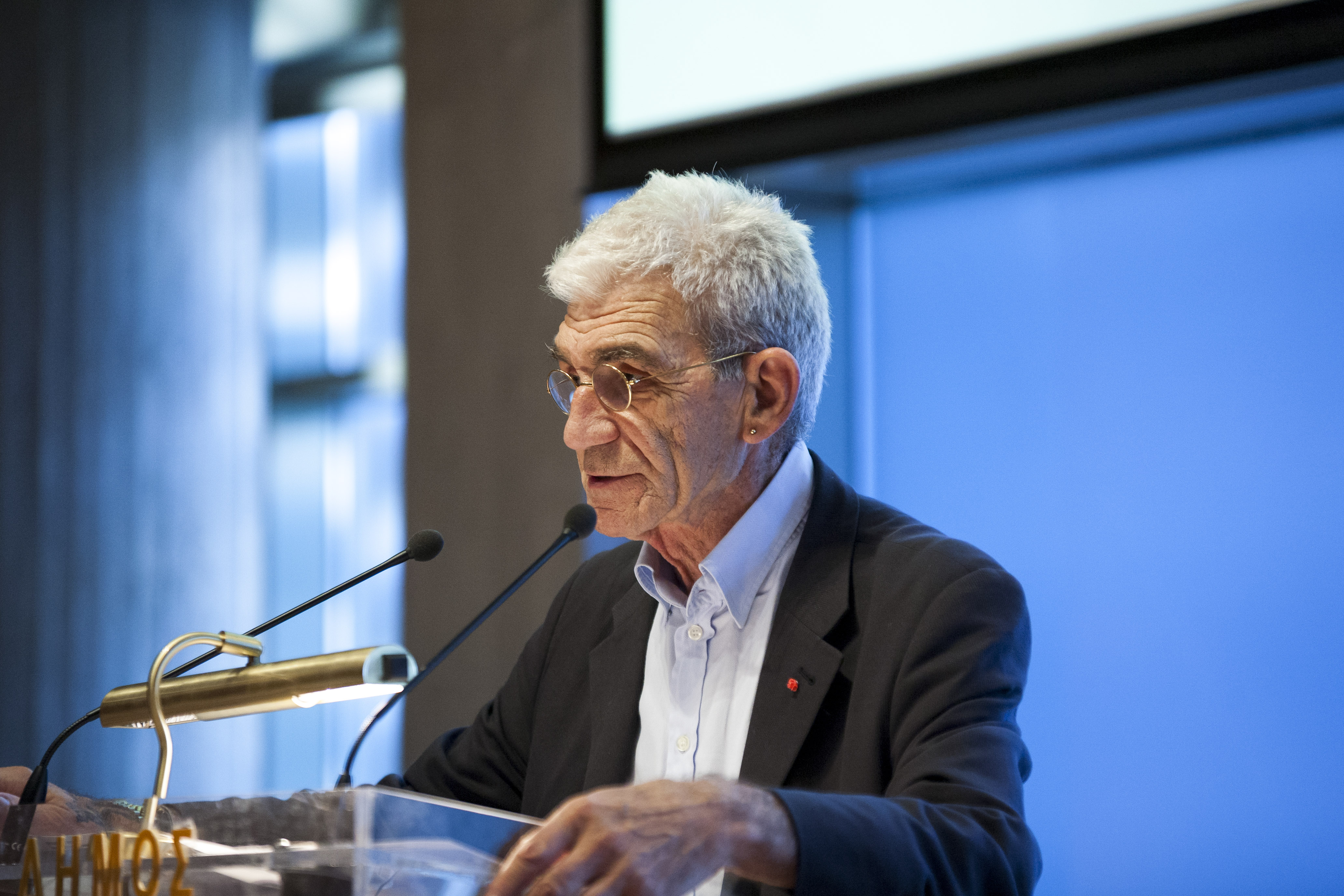
Boutaris speaking as mayor in 2012.

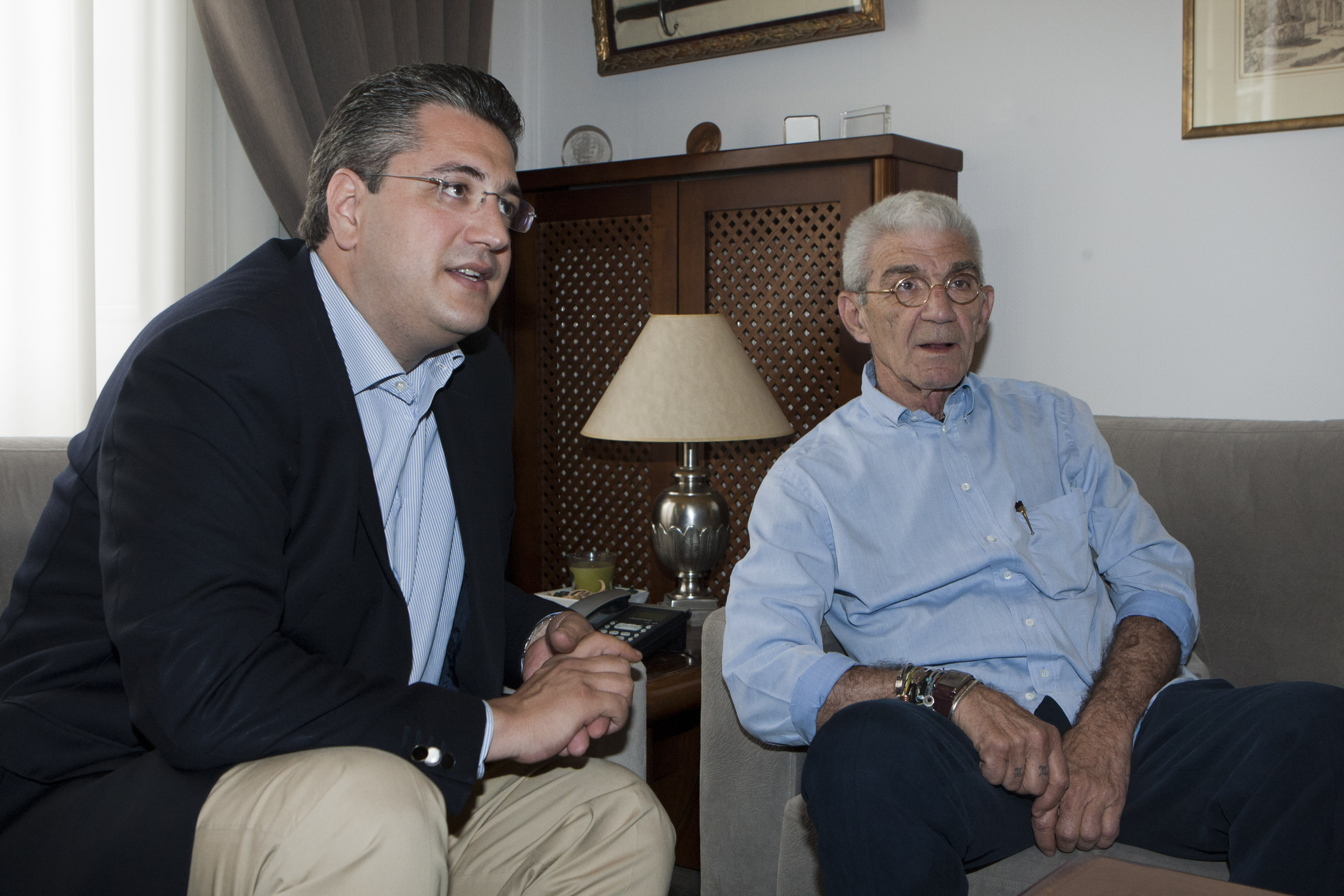
Boutaris with his nephew the former Governor of Central Macedonia Apostolos Tzitzikostas in 2014.

In 2012 he was chosen as 'the best mayor of the world' for the month of October, by the City Mayors Foundation, based in the UK.

In his program was the restoration of Agias Sofias Square and Eleftherias Square, as well as the construction of a Holocaust Museum in the city.

Boutaris also declared his wish to build an Islamic mosque, monuments to Thessaloniki's Jews and to the Young Turk Revolution. According to Boutaris, the construction of these monuments will attract Jewish and Turkish tourists to Thessaloniki, who will want to visit their fathers' hometown.

On 20 May 2018, he was hospitalised after being beaten up by a group of Greek ultra-nationalists angry over his appearance at a remembrance event for the Pontic Greek victims by the Ottomans during World War I. The hardliners claimed that Boutaris made a controversial remark on the issue ("I don't give a shit" if Kemal Atatürk killed Greeks or not"). Nine persons, including a police officer, were convicted for the incident in 2023. Boutaris had previously angered hardliners in Greece because he tried to facilitate relations between Greece and its neighbors and because he opposed nationalist views on the Macedonia naming dispute, Greece–Turkey relations, and The Holocaust in Greece. He was also opposed by Metropolitan of Thessaloniki, Anthimos, who actively campaigned against him in 2010. On the other hand he was widely respected amongst Muslims and ethnic Turks in Greece for his conciliatory efforts regarding Greco-Turkish relations, the Jewish community, the Albanian community, and the Greek Left. He actively supported the creation of the Holocaust Museum of Greece and invited North Macedonian prime minister Zoran Zaev for a New Year reception in 2017, which contributed to the resolution of the Macedonia naming dispute.

In 2024, Boutaris was elected to the municipal council of Thessaloniki, serving until his death.

== Personal life and death ==
Boutaris spoke several times openly about his struggle with alcoholism and his successful effort to quit drinking back in 1991. He was also a supporter of LGBT rights and the legalization of cannabis. In 2021, he published his memoir, titled 60 Years of Harvests. He was a supporter of Aris Thessaloniki, and was a major sponsor of Aris B.C. in the 1980s and 1990s.

Boutaris died in Thessaloniki on 9 November 2024, at the age of 82, days after undergoing a hip operation. He outlived his wife, who died from cancer in 2007. He had three children.

Preceded by Vasilis Papageorgopoulos	Mayor of Thessaloniki; 2011–2019	Succeeded by Konstantinos Zervas
