= Left Struggle =

Greek far left political coalition

Left Struggle Μαχόμενη Αριστερά
- Founded: 1993
- Dissolved: 1999
- Succeeded by: Radical Left Front
- Ideology: Communism; Marxism–Leninism; Maoism; Trotskyism; Anti-capitalism
- Political position: Far-left

Left Struggle (Greek: Μαχόμενη Αριστερά, "Fighting Left") was a Greek far left political coalition of the revolutionary left that was formed in September 1993 amidst the 1993 Greek parliamentary election. The parties that made up Left Struggle were New Left Current, KKE (m-l), EKKE and EEK, while it was supported by many unaffiliated leftists. Fundamental to the movement's foundation was the common role in the anti-war movement for the occasion of the war and the dissolution of Yugoslavia. Also important was the political proposal of New Left Current to create the Front of the Independent Anti-establishment Left in July 1993 that set the stage for co-operation on a political scale.

After 1997 political and ideological differences lead to deviant choices and in 1998 Left Struggle was inactive. In May 1999, New Left Current, EKKE and EEK participated in the founding of the Radical Left Front (MERA).

== Founding Declaration ==
In the founding Electoral Declaration of the Left Struggle, it was emphasized that the 1993 elections “constitute the curtain fall of a fluid period; they are the ‘first act’—and certainly not the most important—of the attempt by the bourgeois forces to impose an unprecedented social and political barbarity,” centered around the transformation of the EEC into the EU, within the international context shaped after the collapse of actually existing socialism.

At the same time, in its founding text, the Left Struggle stated that “the anger and indignation of the working people must fuel a massive and militant resistance that will put a stop to the anti-popular onslaught.”

A key position was also that “the historical dilemma ‘communist liberation or capitalist barbarity’ is posed once again in a dramatic and timely way, bringing to the forefront the need for the revival of revolutionary ideas and the reorganization of the communist movement as the only response to capitalism.”

The Left Struggle supported Greece’s withdrawal from the EU, as well as opposition to capitalist European integration and the Economic and monetary union of the European Union. It maintained a consistent stance against imperialism and nationalism, opposing the military adventurism and interventions of the USA, NATO, and the EU.

== Initiatives ==
The Left Struggle was characterized by its promotion of cooperation within the extra-parliamentary Left, advancing the idea of a revolutionary and anti-capitalist front independent of the parties of the official parliamentary Left, namely the KKE and SYN. This collaboration concerned either stable formations and groupings within the labor and mass movement or initiatives for joint action and solidarity in workers’ struggles, farmers’ mobilizations, opposition to war and nationalism, and the defense of democratic rights and freedoms.

A significant initiative of the Left Struggle came in July 1994, ahead of the municipal elections, for the formation of left-wing, radical, and anti-capitalist movements in cities and neighborhoods. In the October 1994 municipal elections, groups participated in the municipalities of Athens, Peristeri, Vyronas, Serres, Chania, Ioannina, and Pyrgos. This intervention—which continues today through these groups or their successors and has expanded to several municipalities and regions—served as a starting point for a stronger presence of the anti-capitalist Left at the local level.

== Inactivity ==
Despite the unifying nature of the effort, significant political differences gradually created problems in the functioning of the Left Struggle, as they were not adequately addressed. One such issue was organizational: whether it should have an autonomous structure and decision-making process or remain a coalition of organizations. In the trade union sphere, there were disagreements regarding relations with official union structures, the logic of demands (“defensive” or “offensive”), the role of the bourgeois class in Greece, and whether it was “dependent” or not on imperialism, among others. These differences led to political choices that showed the course of the Left Struggle was not secure.

In the 1994 European elections, NAR, EEK, EKKΕ, and unaffiliated members participated in the Left Movement Against the EEC, while KKE (m-l) insisted on its position of abstention from the elections. In the 1994 municipal elections, the EEK did not participate in the Left Struggle Movement of Athens, disagreeing with the decision to abstain from the second round. In the student movement, KKE (m-l) participated through its own group, “Fighting Movements,” and did not take part in the broader EAAK front in universities and technical institutes supported by the other forces of the Left Struggle.

These issues gradually led to the inactivation of the Left Struggle in 1998. Following the decisions of NAR's 1st Congress in July 1998, the coalition effectively dissolved.

Nevertheless, common initiatives continued on various issues. The organizations of the Left Struggle collaborated, along with other groups, in the municipal elections of 2002 (Thessaloniki and elsewhere) and more broadly in 2006 (Athens, Thessaloniki, Piraeus, etc.). They also cooperated in organizing the International Anti-Imperialist and Anti-Capitalist Meeting on May 4–7, 2006, during the days of the European Social Forum in Athens. The practice of joint action initiatives continues to this day.

== Election results ==
Year	Leader	Votes	% of total votes	Seats	Result
1993	Andreas Voyiatzoglou	8.160	0,15%	0 / 300	10th place Extraparliamentary
1996	central committee	10.443	0,15%	0 / 300	12th place Extraparliamentary

After 1997, the coalition disestablished and in 1999 all the parties of the coalition, except the CPG (m-l), formed Radical Left Front.
