= 2023 Greek local elections =

Local elections in Greece

← 2019	8 October & 15 October 2023	2028 →

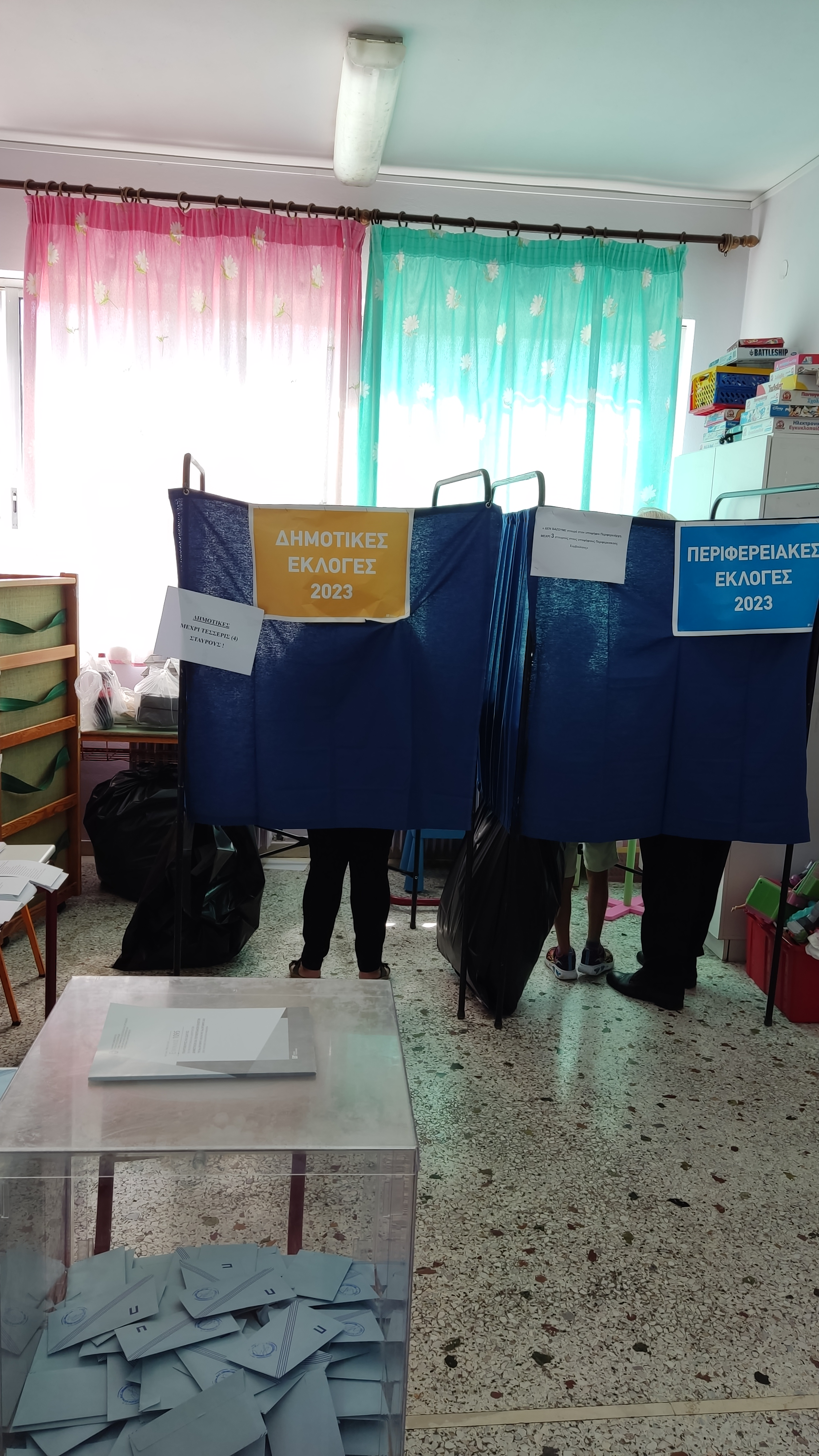
The polling booth in Argos, Peloponnese.

Local elections were held in Greece on 8 October 2023 and, where a second round was required, on 15 October 2023. Voters elected representatives to the country's local authorities, comprising 13 regions and 332 municipalities.

== List ==
- 2023 Greek Local Elections in Crete
- 2023 Athens municipal election
- 2023 Thessaloniki municipal election
- 2023 Patras municipal election

== Results ==
=== Municipalities ===
==== Athens ====
Ecologist PASOK – KINAL-backed (and SYRIZA-endorsed in the runoff) Haris Doukas defeated the incumbent center-right ND mayor of Athens Kostas Bakoyannis, in a runoff in the 2023 Athens Municipal Elections.

==== Thessaloniki ====
Thessaloniki ND-backed mayor Konstantinos Zervas was defeated in a landslide victory by independent challenger Stelios Aggeloudis, also in a runoff, with Aggeloudis receiving 67% of the vote to Zervas' 32%.

==== Others ====
In Piraeus and in Patras, both incumbent mayors, centrist Ioannis Moralis and communist Kostas Peletidis were re-elected.

=== Regions ===
In Attica, ND-backed Nikos Chardalias, former deputy defense and former deputy citizen protection minister won in a landslide on the first round.

In Central Greece, incumbent ND-backed Fanis Spanos defeated the main Independent SYRIZA-backed candidate Apostolos Gletsos, 48% to 25%, and secured his second consecutive term.

In Central Macedonia, incumbent ND-backed Apostolos Tzitzikostas defeated the other candidates in a landslide, with the second one in line having a 59-point gap, thus securing his third full term.

In Crete, incumbent Stavros Arnaoutakis, backed by PASOK – KINAL and ND, secured his fourth consecutive term, making him the longest serving Governor in the country of Greece, along with Alexandros Kachrimanis.

In Eastern Macedonia and Thrace, Christodoulos Topsidis, a member of ND, but without their backing, defeated the main ND-backed candidate, incumbent Governor Christos Metios, 51% to 49%, on the second round.

In Epirus, incumbent ND-backed Alexandros Kachrimanis defeated the other candidates in a landslide, with the second one in line having a 42-point gap, thus, he secured his fourth consecutive term, making him the longest serving Governor in the country of Greece, along with Crete's Stavros Arnaoutakis.

In the Ionian Islands, Giannis Trepeklis, a member of ND, but without their backing, defeated the main ND-backed candidate, incumbent Rodi Kratsa-Tsagaropoulou, 65% to 35%, on the second round.

In the North Aegean, Kostas Moutzouris, a member of ND, but without their backing, defeated the main ND-backed candidate, incumbent Governor Alkiviadis Stefanis, 55% to 45%, on the second round.

In the Peloponnese, ND-backed Dimitris Ptoxos defeated Independent former deputy minister of culture and former Regional Governor, Petros Tatoulis, in the runoff, with 53% of the vote over Tatoulis’ 47%.

In the South Aegean, incumbent ND-backed Giorgos Hatzimarkos defeated the other candidates in a landslide, with the second one in line having a 51-point gap, thus, he secured his third consecutive term.

In Thessaly, Independent Dimitris Kouretas, backed by SYRIZA and PASOK – KINAL, defeated the main candidate, three term incumbent ND-backed Konstantinos Agorastos in an upset after the Tempi train crash and the Storm Daniel, in a landslide, 60% to 40%, on the second round.

In Western Greece, incumbent ND-backed Nektarios Farmakis defeated the other candidates in a landslide, with the second one in line having a 46-point gap thus, he secured his second consecutive term.

In Western Macedonia, Giorgos Amanatidis, a member of ND, but without their backing, defeated the main ND-backed candidate, incumbent Governor Giorgos Kasapidis, 57% to 43%, on the second round.
