= 2023 Patras municipal election =

Local election in Greece

- 8 October 2023 (First Round); 15 October 2023 (Second Round)
- Registered: 165,701
- Turnout: 54.14% (First Round); 44.42% (Second Round)
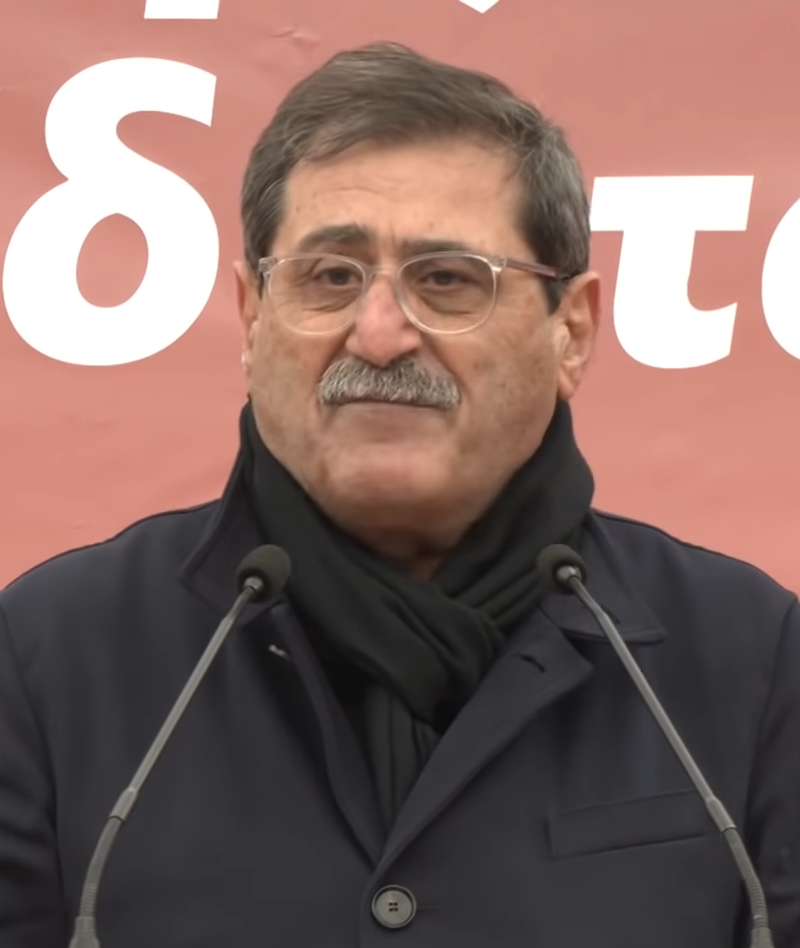
| | First party | Second party | Third party |
|---|---|---|---|
| | | ND | PAS |
| Candidate | Kostas Peletidis | Konstantinos Svolis | Vasileios Aivalis |
| Party | KKE | New Democracy without Party Support | PASOK with PASOK and Syriza support |
| Alliance | Laiki Syspirosi Dimou Patreon (Popular Coalition of Patras Municipality) | Patra Enomeni (United Patras) | Patra Spoudaia kai Pali (Patras Glorious Again) |
| Seats before | 20 | 7 | *New* |
| Seats after | 26 | 7 | 6 |
| First round | 34,774; 39.95% | 22,226; 25.53% | 17,156; 19.71% |
| Second round | 40,577; 56.69% | 31,003; 43.31% | Eliminated |
| | Fourth party |
| | Ind |
| Candidate | Petros Psomas |
| Party | Independent |
| Alliance | Spiral |
| Seats before | 3 |
| Seats after | 4 |
| Popular vote | 12,890 |
| Percentage | 14.81% |
| Second round | Eliminated |
Mayor before election
Kostas Peletidis
KKE
Elected mayor
Kostas Peletidis
KKE

2023 Patras Municipal election was held on 8 October 2023 to elect the mayor of Patras as a part of the 2023 Greek Local elections. It moved to a second round run-off that took place a week later, on 15 October, between incumbent Kostas Peletidis backed by KKE and New Democracy supporter Kostantinos Svolis with no party support.

As all municipal elections in Greece the system used is one of 2-round proportional representation with reinforced proportinality.

KKE candidate Kostas Peletidis got reelected to the position of mayor with a smaller percentage in contrast to the last time but also became one of the few KKE candidates that came victorious in the 2023 Greek Local elections. Receiving an absolute 3/5s majority in the municipal council as per a new electoral law.

== Background ==
=== Previous Election ===
Incumbent KKE candidate Kostas Peletidis came first with 40.6% winning 20 out of the 49 seats, with Independent candidate Grigoris Alexopoulos coming second being defeated in the second round with KKE candidate being ahead with an over 40 point margin, yet this being with the previous electoral law Peletidis failed to achieve a full majority in the council.

2019 Patras municipal election result
| List | Seats | Vote share 1st | Vote share 2nd |
|---|---|---|---|
| Laiki Syspirosi Patras | 20 | 40.60 | 70.86 |
| Protevousa Xana! | 8 | 16.01 | 29.14 |
| Patra Enomeni | 7 | 13.97 | |
| Nea Patra | 4 | 7.58 | |
| Ora Patron | 3 | 6.68 | |
| Spiral | 1 | 6.38 | |
| Patra: I diki mas Poli! | 1 | 2.63 | |
| Dimotiki kinisi koinotiton | 1 | 2.03 | |
| Patra Diethnis Sychroni Poli | 1 | 1.85 | |
| Anypotakti Politeia | 1 | 1.43 | |
| Antarsia gia tin Patra | 0 | 0.42 | |
| Antikapitalistiki Anatropi - Antarsia stin Patra | 0 | 0.42 | |

=== Electoral System ===
The New Democracy government changed the law on local elections, enacting "Law 4804/2021". As per this law, "The distribution of municipal or regional council seats between the successful and runner-up list is done by a system of Reinforced proportionality, so that the successful combination holds at least 3/5 of the council seats.". Also stating that when it comes to the percentage needed for a list to enter the council and the percentage needed or the elections to lack a second round that "[...] in order for a list to be entitled to at least one seat on the municipal or district council, it must receive at least 3% of the valid ballots in the first round of elections. The combination that received at least 43% of the valid ballots plus one vote in the first round is declared successful and its head is elected mayor or regional governor."

== Results ==
| Candidate | List | Party Support | % First Round | 1st Round Votes | % Second Round | 2nd Round Votes | Seats |
|---|---|---|---|---|---|---|---|
| Kostas Peletidis | Popular Coalition of Patras Municipality | KKE | 39.95 | 34,774 | 56.69 | 40,577 | 26 |
| Kostantinos Svolis | United Patras | Independent | 27.34 | 26,100 | 32.67 | 24,413 | 7 |
| Vasileios Aivalis | Patras Glorious Again | PASOK and Syriza | 19.71 | 17,156 | | | 6 |
| Petros Psomas | Spiral | Independent | 14.81 | 12,890 | | | 4 |
