= 2023 Crete regional election =

Local election in Greece

- 8 October 2023

All 45 seats to the Regional Council of Crete
- Turnout: 59.11%
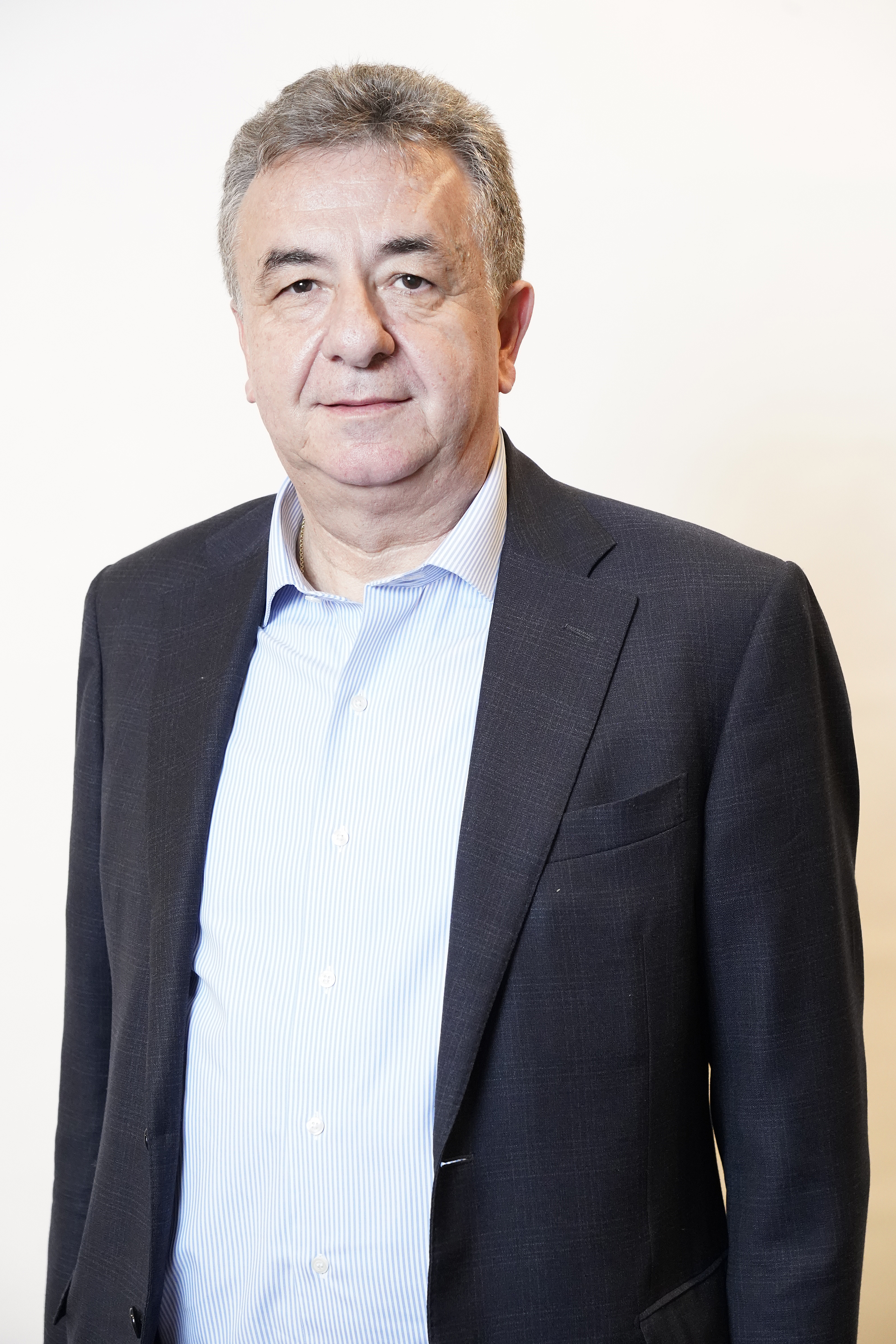

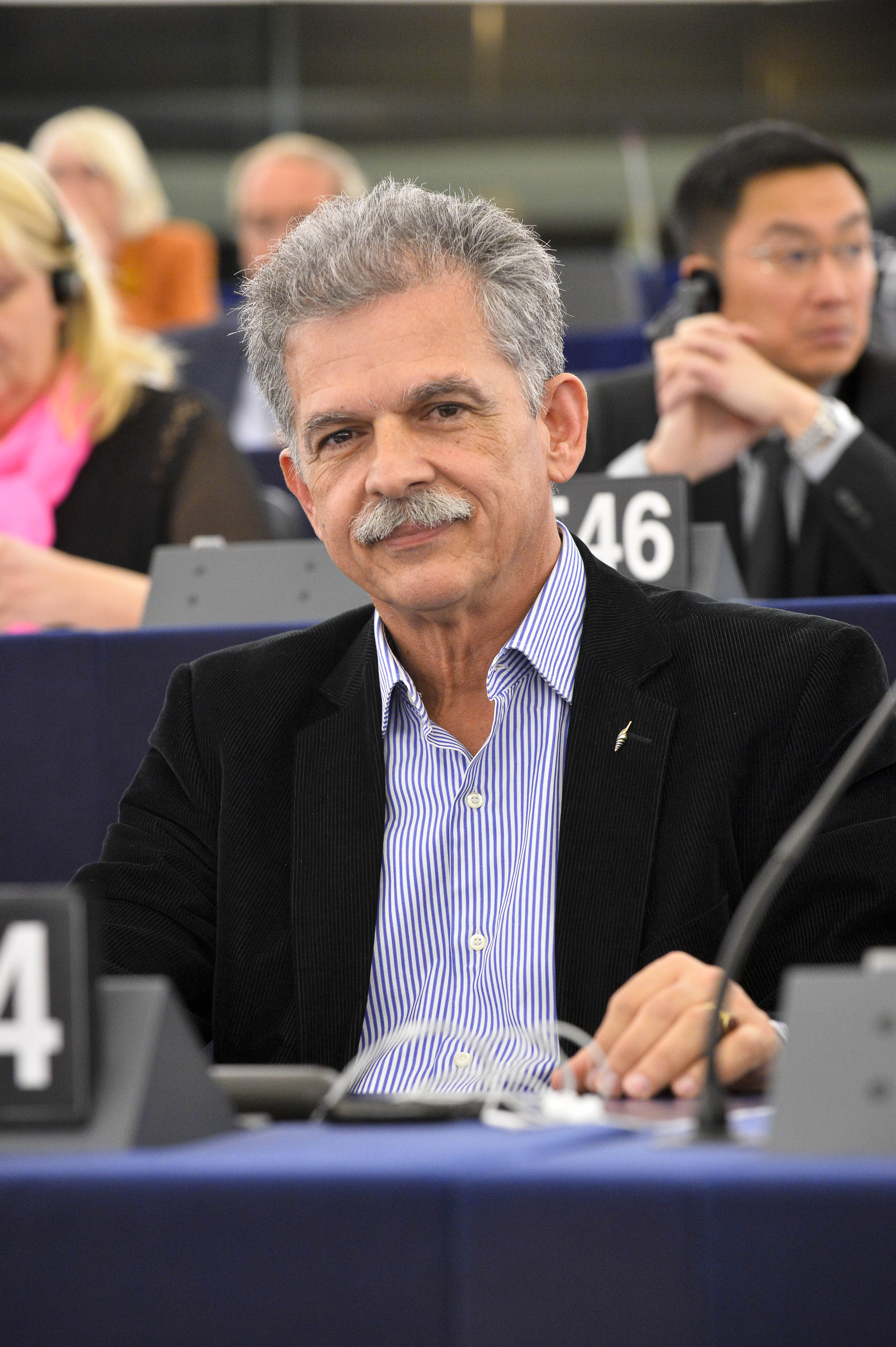
	First party	Second party	Third party
Candidate	Stavros Arnaoutakis	Spyros Danellis	Alekos Marinakis
Party	For our Crete	Our Crete Differently	Popular Convolution of Crete
Alliance	PASOK–ND	SYRIZA	KKE
Seats won	37	5	3
Seat change	▲6	new	Steady
Popular vote	245.198	34.576	25.720
Percentage	78.31%	11,04%	8,21%
Swing	▲17.49pp	new	▲1.86pp
Regional Governor before election
Stavros Arnaoutakis
PASOK
Elected Regional Governor
Stavros Arnaoutakis
PASOK

The 2023 Cretan regional election took place on 8 October 2023, simultaneously with the rest of Greece. The election was for all 45 elected seats of the Regional Council of Crete as well as the Regional Governor.

This was the fourth Cretan regional election and the incumbent Governor (Stavros Arnaoutakis, PASOK) ran for a fourth consecutive term.

The ballot resulted in the election of Stavros Arnaoutakis, the incumbent Governor, as Regional Governor with 78% of the votes. The left-wing candidate, former SYRIZA MP Spyros Danellis, came in second with 11 percent. The KKE candidate, Alekos Marinakis, received 8 percent of the vote. The anticapitalist list failed to obtain 3% of the votes, thus losing its representation in the Council.

== Electoral system ==
According to the new electoral system introduced by the New Democracy government in 2021, the majority percentage is defined as greater than 43% plus one vote of all valid ballots, instead of 50% plus one vote. In particular, the election of the regional governor is ensured from the first round, with an election threshold of 43%. If the first list receives up to 60%, it elects 3/5 of the regional council seats, while for more than 60%, the seats of each list are distributed proportionally.

== Results ==
Party	Votes	%	Seats
For Our Crete	245,198	78.31	37
Our Crete Differently	34,576	11.04	5
Popular Convolution of Crete	25,720	8.21	3
Insubordinate Crete	7,628	2.44	0
Total	313,122	100.00	45
Valid votes	313,122	94.31	
Invalid/blank votes	18,889	5.69	
Total votes	332,011	100.00	
Registered voters/turnout	544,920	60.93	

== Aftermath ==
As the "For Our Crete" list did obtain more than 43% of the votes in the first round, the second round did not take place. The new Regional Council members were sworn in on December 21, 2023. The ceremony took place in St. Marc's Basilica in Heraklion. Shortly after, Stavros Arnaoutakis announced the members of his fourth regional cabinet. It consisted of 11 thematic Vice Regional Governors:

Order	Office	Portrait	Name	List	Took office	Left office	Regional Unit
1	Regional Governor		Stavros Arnaoutakis	For our Crete	1 January 2024	Incumbent	Heraklion
2	Vice Regional Governor for Climate Change and Sustainable Mobility		Ioannis Anastasakis	For our Crete	1 January 2024	Incumbent	Heraklion
3	Vice Regional Governor for Entrepreneurship		Michael Vavmvoukas	For our Crete	1 January 2024	Incumbent	Rethymno
4	Vice Regional Governor for Social Policy and Solidarity		Stylianos Voryias	For our Crete	1 January 2024	Incumbent	Heraklion
5	Vice Regional Governor for Tourism		Kyriakos Kotsoglou	For our Crete	1 January 2024	Incumbent	Chania
6	Vice Regional Governor for Interconnection with Research and Academic Foundations		Georgios Matalliotakis	For our Crete	1 January 2024	Incumbent	Heraklion
7	Vice Regional Governor for Culture and Equality		Georgia Milaki	For our Crete	1 January 2024	Incumbent	Heraklion
8	Vice Regional Governor for Environment		Nikolaos Xylouris	For our Crete	1 January 2024	Incumbent	Heraklion
9	Vice Regional Governor for Coordination and Support of the Technical Projects Directorate		Nikolaos Skoulas	For our Crete	1 January 2024	Incumbent	Heraklion
10	Vice Regional Governor for Sports		Leonidas Terzis	For our Crete	1 January 2024	Incumbent	Lasithi
11	Vice Regional Governor for Agriculture		Stavros Tzedakis	For our Crete	1 January 2024	Incumbent	Heraklion
12	Vice Regional Governor for Civil Protection		Georgios Tsapakos	For our Crete	1 January 2024	Incumbent	Chania
