= Nana Aidona =

Greek politician

- Νανά Αηδονά

Governor of Central Macedonia
- Incumbent
- Assumed office 14 December 2024
- Preceded by: Apostolos Tzitzikostas

Personal details
- Born: Xanthi, Greece
- Party: New Democracy
- Education: Aristotle University of Thessaloniki

Athina Aidona, more known as Nana Aidona (Greek: Νανά Αηδονά) is a Greek lawyer and politician. She is the Governor of Central Macedonia since 2024 and the only woman regional governor of Greece.

== Career ==
Aidona was born in Xanthi, Eastern Macedonia and Thrace, Greece. She got a degree in law from the Aristotle University of Thessaloniki, has practised as a lawyer at the Supreme Civil and Criminal Court of Greece and is a member of the Thessaloniki Bar Association. She has headed the legal department of the Hellenic Council of State, the Thessaloniki Lawyers’ Pension Fund, and has served as president of the Hellenic Lawyers’ Fund, successfully increasing lawyers’ supplementary pensions by up to 75%, and has been vice-president of the Thessaloniki International Fair.

Her political career began in 1996, when she stood as a New Democracy candidate in the 1996 parliamentary election for the Thessaloniki A constituency and had close ties to Kostas Karamanlis. She joined the Thessaloniki prefecture in 2002.

At regional level, Aidona served as president of the Prefectural Council, deputy prefect for Health in the Prefecture of Thessaloniki, president of the Regional Council of Central Macedonia, and vice governor of Central Macedonia for Finance, Transparency and E-Government during the Apostolos Tzitzikostas government. After the 2023 regional elections, Aidona was elected Vice Governor in the ticket of Tzitzikostas.

After the resignation of Tzitzikostas to became European Commissioner for Sustainable Transport and Tourism, Aidona was elected the new governor of Central Macedonia on 14 December 2024. She secured 35 of the 39 votes cast by the members of the regional council, defeating Voula Patoulidou, who received 3 votes, and one vote left blank, and became the only woman governor in Greece.

== Personal life ==
She is married and have two children, and grandchildren.
