= Iskender Bey Mosque =

Former mosque in Giannitsa, Greece

- Τζαμί του Ισκεντέρ Μπέη
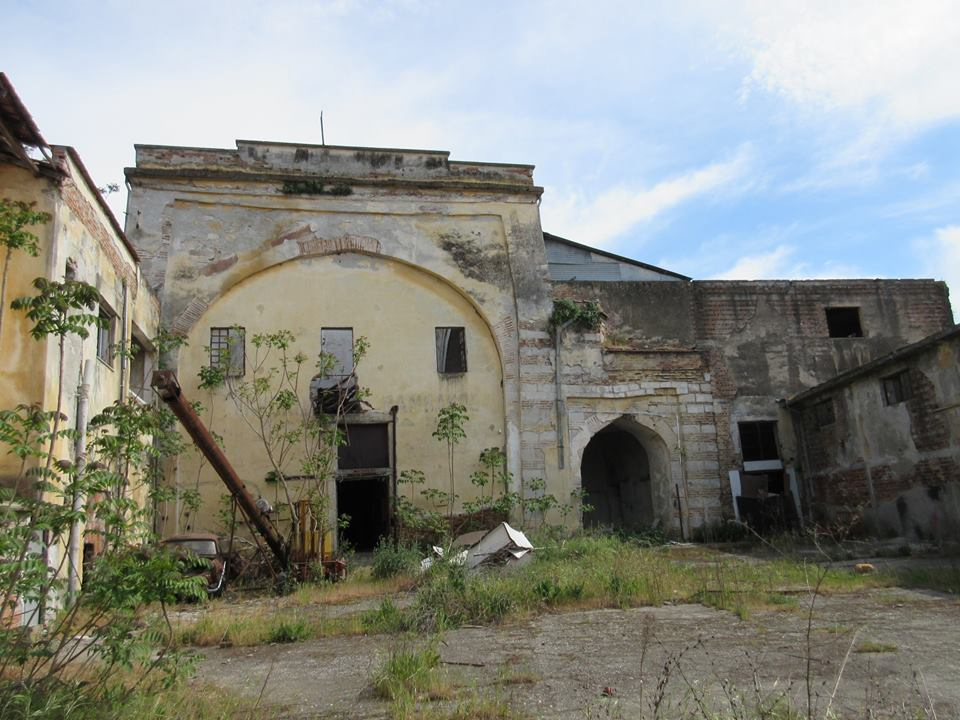
- The former mosque

- Location of the former mosque in Greece

Religion
- Affiliation: Sunni Islam (former)
- Ecclesiastical or organizational status: Mosque (1512–1912)
- Status: Abandoned (as a mosque); Repurposed (for profane use)

Location
- Location: Giannitsa, Pella, Central Macedonia
- Country: Greece
- Interactive map of Iskender Bey Mosque
- Coordinates: 40°47′01″N 22°24′38″E

Architecture
- Type: Mosque
- Style: Ottoman
- Founder: İskender Bey Evrenosoğlu
- Completed: c. 1512

Specifications
- Dome: 2 (destroyed)
- Dome dia. (outer): 14 m (46 ft)
- Minarets: 1 (destroyed, 1930s)
- Materials: Stone; brick

The Iskender Bey Mosque (Greek: Τζαμί του Ισκεντέρ Μπέη, from Turkish: İskender Bey Camii) is a former mosque in the town of Giannitsa, in Central Macedonia, in northern Greece. The mosque was built in the early 16th century, during the Ottoman era, by İskender Bey Evrenosoğlu, after whom it was named, who was the grandson of Gazi Evrenos, the founder of Giannitsa. The mosque was abandoned during the 1910s, and it is in partial ruins, in need of restoration. It is not accessible to the public. It is one of the three surviving Ottoman mosques in Giannitsa.

== History ==
The mosque was probably built between 1481 and 1512, most likely closer to the later date, and was commissioned by the grandson of Gazi Evrenos, one Iskender Bey Evrenosoğlu. It was also called the Büyük Mosque (meaning large). It has been suggested that Iskender Bey renovated a mosque that had already been built by his grandfather.

When Turkish traveller Evliya Çelebi visited Giannitsa in the seventeenth century he described it as the "most well-developed, arranged, furnished, beautiful" building in the town, visited by many people.

It was heavily damaged by bombing during the First Balkan War in 1911–12. Following the annexation of Giannitsa and the wider Macedonia region by the Kingdom of Greece in 1912 it was sold by the National Bank to individuals, and used as a warehouse until 1950, and then as a cotton factory. In 1974 and again in 2000, the mosque was declared a cultural monument. An expropriation process by the Ministry of Culture has been underway since the end of 2021.

== Architecture ==
It was built in the middle of the bazaar. Evliya Çelebi describes it as a praying mosque with a lead-covered dome. The typical ceramic roof tiles of Byzantine architecture, was also employed in many Ottoman monuments in Greece, the mosque of Iskender Bey among them. The mosque is built in eywan style, characterized by the central hall and the prayer hall eywan. Iskender Bey Mosque is one of the two mosques in Greece of this style, the other being the Alaca Imaret Mosque in Thessaloniki. The mosque has side rooms that are covered with two large semi-domes connected to the central dome along the same axis to form one oblong space; it is a unique feature which is not found elsewhere in Ottoman architecture.

It has a five-bay portico, the most common type (along with the three-bay one) for Ottoman mosques in Greece. The dome, when it still stood, was 14 metres (46 ft) in diameter. Both its interior and its exterior have undergone many alterations as a result of the mosque's various uses of the recent years, while its central dome has collapsed. Of the minaret, only the base survives; it stood at least as late as the 1930s as evidenced from old documents. Nothing survives of the old fountain and cemetery.

Iskender Bey Mosque was described by professor Machiel Kiel as "a highly original building of a type we do not find anywhere else in the vast dominations of Ottoman architecture."

== Gallery ==
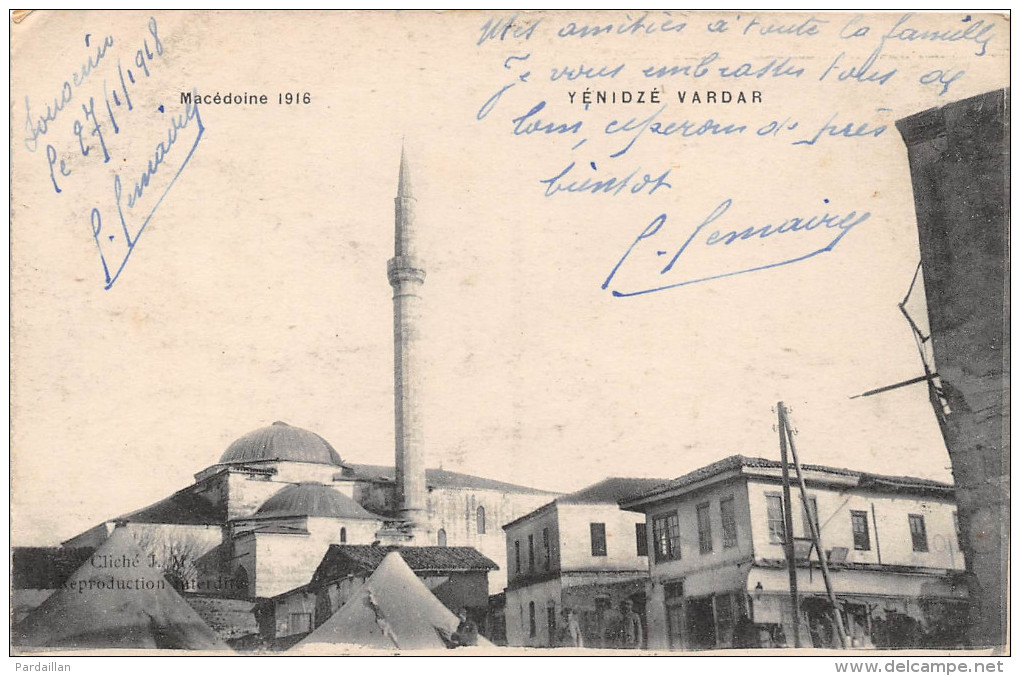
1916-1918 postcard of the mosque.

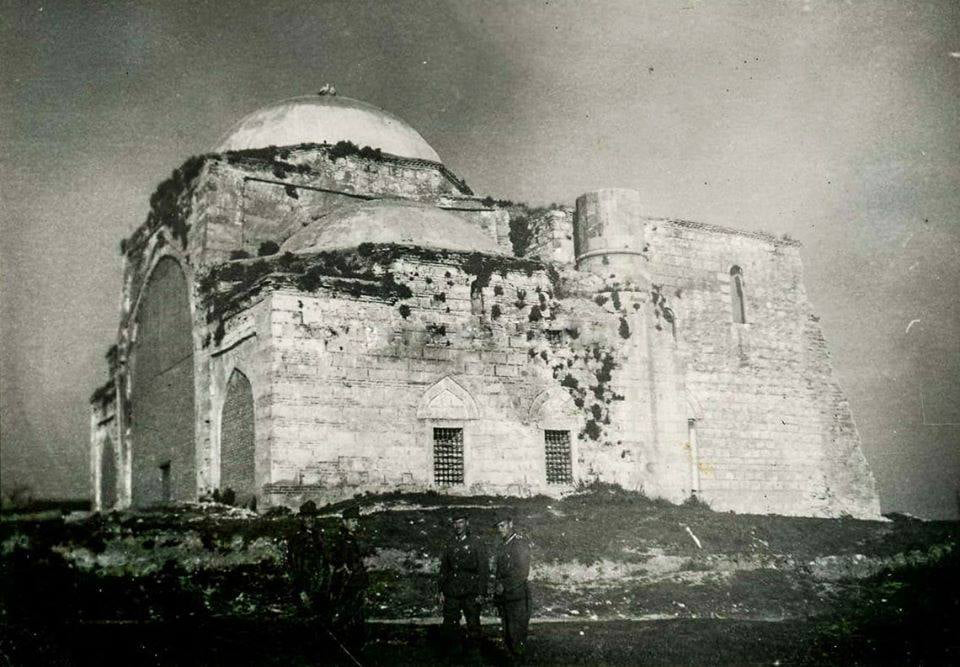
Iskender Bey Mosque around 1941-1944

== See also ==
- Islam in Greece
- List of former mosques in Greece
- Ottoman Greece

== Bibliography ==
- Ameen, Ahmed (2017). Islamic architecture in Greece: Mosques. Alexandria, Egypt: Center for Islamic Civilization studies, Bibliotheca Alexandrina.
- Skiadaresis, Georgios (2012). The Ottoman monuments of Giannitsa. Ephorate of Antiquities of Pella.
- Stavridopoulos, Ioannis (2015). Μνημεία του άλλου: η διαχείριση της οθωμανικής πολιτιστική κληρονομιάς της Μακεδονίας από το 1912 έως σήμερα [Other People's Monuments: the Management of the Ottoman Cultural Heritage of Macedonia from 1912 to the present] (Thesis) (in Greek). Ioannina: University of Ioannina.
