= Left Anti-capitalist Group =

Organisation of anti-capitalists in Greece

Left Anti-capitalist Group Αριστερή Αντικαπιταλιστική Συσπείρωση
- Founded: 1997
- Ideology: Anti-capitalism
- National affiliation: Front of the Greek Anticapitalist Left (2007–2015); Popular Unity (2015–present); MeRA25 (2023–2025)
- International affiliation: none

Website
- aras.gr

Left Anti-capitalist Group (Greek: Αριστερή Aντικαπιταλιστική Συσπείρωση, ΑΡΑΣ; Aristeri Antikapitalistiki Syspeirosi, ARAS) is a Greek political organisation of the anti-capitalist left, formed in 1997. In the 2007 Greek legislative it participated in the United Anti-Capitalist Left electoral coalition. In 2015, it joined the Popular Unity for the September 2015 election.

== See also ==
- Politics of Greece
- List of political parties in Greece
