= 2023 Thessaloniki municipal election =

Local election in Greece

2023 Thessaloniki municipal elections
- 8 October 2023 (First Round); 15 October 2023 (Second Round)
- Registered: 241,527
- Turnout: 40.95% (First Round); 32.57% (Second Round)

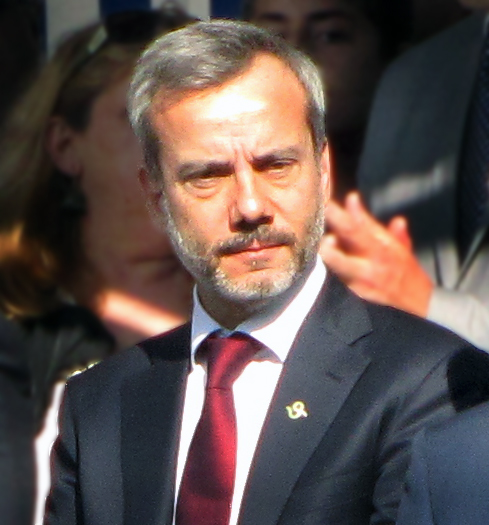
	Majority party	Minority party
Candidate	Stelios Angeloudis	Konstantinos Zervas
Party	PASOK – Movement for Change (Note: PASOK – Movement for Change member, ran as an Independent.)	New Democracy
Alliance	Team for Thessaloniki	Yes, in Thessaloniki
Seats after	26	7
Seat change	New	0
Popular vote	50,305	24,413
Percentage	67.33%	32.67%
Swing	New	▼34.12 pp

The 2023 Thessaloniki Municipal election was held on 8 October 2023 to elect the mayor of Thessaloniki and its city council, as part of the 2023 Greek Local elections. It moved to a second round run-off that took place a week later, on 15 October, between incumbent Konstantinos Zervas backed by ND and Independent candidate Stelios Angeloudis. In the second round, Stelios Angeloudis won with almost 67% of the vote, defeating the incumbent Kostantinos Zervas, with almost 30 points ahead, electing 6+20 councilors.

== Background ==
The New Democracy government changed the law on local elections, enacting "Law 4804/2021". As per this law, "The distribution of municipal or regional council seats between the successful and runner-up list is done by a system of Reinforced proportionality, so that the successful combination holds at least 3/5 of the council seats.". Also stating that when it comes to the percentage needed for a list to enter the council and the percentage needed or the elections to lack a second round that "[...] in order for a list to be entitled to at least one seat on the municipal or district council, it must receive at least 3% of the valid ballots in the first round of elections. The combination that received at least 43% of the valid ballots plus one vote in the first round is declared successful and its head is elected mayor or regional governor."

== Results ==
Candidate	List	Party Support	% First Round	Votes 1st Round	% Second Round	Votes 2nd Round	Seats
Kostantinos Zervas	Yes to Thessaloniki	New Democracy	27,34	26.100	32,67	24.413	7
Stelios Angeloudis	Team for Thessaloniki	-	25,74	24.572	67,33	50.305	26
Spyros Pengas	Thessaloniki for All	Independents + Syriza	20,74	19.798			5
Vassilis Tompoulidis	Popular Coalition Of Thessaloniki	KKE	6,82	6.514			2
Drosos Tsavlis	All of Us Drosos Tsavlis	-	5,69	5.428			1
Maria Keki	The City Upside down and Collaborating Movements	-	5,53	5.276			1
Stergios Kalogiros	Thessaloniki Macedonia Stergios Kalogiros	-	4,61	4.400			1
Giannis Kouriannidis	Thessaloniki a Greek City	Niki	1,95	1.863			0
Dimitris Ziampazis	United Macedonians for Thessaloniki municipality	-	1,59	1.516			0
