= Prin =

Greek newspaper

- Type: Weekly newspaper
- Format: Tabloid
- Owner: Publications-Studies-Research (Εκδόσεις-Μελέτες-Έρευνες)
- Publisher: Dimitris Desyllas
- Editor: Giorgos Delastik
- Founded: 18 March 1990
- Political alignment: Communist; Far-left
- Language: Greek
- Headquarters: Charilaou Trikoupi 76, 106 80, Athens
- Circulation: 1,600
- Website: prin.gr

Prin (Greek: Πριν, meaning "Before") is a weekly newspaper, published in Athens and circulating nationwide. Prin is published by the New Left Current, although it is not strictly the newspaper of the party.

== History ==
Prin started as a monthly magazine, published by members of the Communist Party of Greece. Shortly after the secession of several members of the Central Committee, that led to the foundation of the New Left Current, Prin was transformed into a weekly newspaper on 18 March 1990.

== Content ==
Prin is organised in several sections as following:

- Politics: Includes permanent columns and commentary on the current political situation
- Iconoclasts (Greek: Εικονοκλάστες): A two-page analysis of a political, economic or ideological issue
- Prinidon: Small comments of the political situation
- Opinions (Greek: Απόψεις): Articles of associates plus analysis of the Political line of the New Left Current
- The other side (Greek: Η άλλη όψη): A two-page article on a historic or ideological issue.
- Τimeliness (Greek: Επικαιρότητα): Announcement of political events plus a permanent column of socioeconomic commentary.
- Interview: An interview of a political figure, most commonly not associated with the New Left Current
- Society (Greek: Κοινωνία): Articles on social issues
- Workers (Greek: Εργαζόμενοι): News of trade unions most commonly elections, strikes and demonstrations.
- Ideas (Greek: Κίνηση ιδεών): Articles of independent left militants or other political organisations.
- Culture
- International

== Motto ==
Newspaper of the Independent Left (Greek: Εφημερίδα της ανεξάρτητης Αριστεράς)

== See also ==
- New Left Current
- Anticapitalist Left Cooperation for the Overthrow
