= New Left Current =

New Left Current Νέο Αριστερό Ρεύμα
- Founded: 1990
- Dissolved: 2025
- Split from: KKE
- Merged into: Communist Liberation
- Headquarters: Athens, Greece
- Newspaper: Prin
- Youth wing: Youth of Communist Liberation
- Ideology: Communism; Anti-capitalism; New Left
- National affiliation: Antarsya
- Colours: Red

Party flag
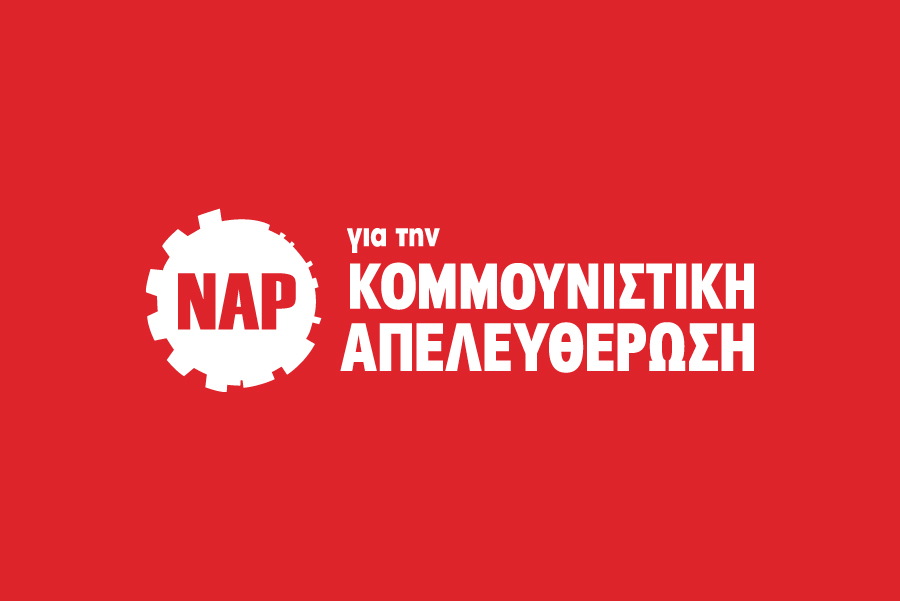

Website
- narnet.gr

The New Left Current (Greek: Νέο Αριστερό Ρεύμα (για την Κομμουνιστική Απελευθέρωση), ΝΑΡ; Neo Aristero Revma, NAR) was a Greek communist political party, formed in 1990 mainly by former members of the youth organization of the Communist Party of Greece, after its foundation congress in February 2025 NAR ceased to exist passing all its history and archives to the new organisation with the name Communist Liberation (Greek: Κομμουνιστική Απελευθέρωση).

== Background ==
In 1989, following the June and November general legislative elections in Greece, after which no party obtained the necessary majority to be able to form a government, the New Democracy and Synaspismos parties agreed to form a coalition government led by New Democracy's Tzannis Tzannetakis, as prime minister.

The Synaspismos was an electoral alliance between the Communist Party of Greece (KKE), and the Greek Left party. The coalition government's stated, primary objective was to deal with the Koskotas scandal, ostensibly linked to PASOK's leadership. The decision of the KKE to enter into a government with the liberal-conservative party of New Democracy was met with objections by many of its members, with the strongest ones coming from the party's youth organization.

The dissidents held the majority in the Youth organization's leadership council and, from November 1989 onward, held a series of meetings and assemblies throughout the country against the "electoral coalition with the Right." The Communist Youth's Secretary General Yannis Grapsas, asked whether he will follow the party's directives, states publicly "I will certainly not obey," the first time that such a disagreement from the Youth leader was revealed in public. In response, KKE expels the dissidents from the Youth organization, along with a significant number of the organization's members.

At the same time, prominent members of the Communist Party itself, such as Kostas Kappos, (Note: Kappos, as member of the Greek Parliament, representing KKE, refused to give a confidence vote for the New Democracy-Synaspismos government in June 1989 and was expelled from the party's Central Committee. See in.gr (2005).) leave KKE.

== Establishment ==
Following a December 1989 country-wide meeting of sympathizers, a tentative platform was put into circulation, titled "Proposal for a dialogue: For a new prospect of the Left in 1990's Greece," that clearly aims at establishing a new organization.

On 10 and 11 February 1990, the 1st All-Greece Assembly of the New Left Current was held in the facilities of the Athens Polytechnic, in which some four hundred elected representatives from across the country participate, vote on the party's political platform, and elect the Co-ordination Committee. (Note: NAR's Co-ordination Committee became in a short time its Political Committee. See Pantiera (2020).)

The Communist Party denounces NAR as "opportunists" and "social democrats", accusing the new party that, in demanding the "re-nationalization of privatized public enterprises," it supports the delusion of state capitalism. Other voices of the Left, accuse NAR of promoting the notion of "reforming the capitalist system" rather than replacing it with socialism, and, also, of "smearing KKE."

== Ideology ==
Αs related by Political Committee member Dimitris Desyllas, the New Left Current supports the collaboration within the movement of the "fighting Left" for the implementation of a radical, anti-capitalist program. NAR's political objectives are denoted as capitalism's overthrow and the establishment of a workers' democracy in a communist regime. The basic tenets of such a regime would be the end of private, capitalist ownership of the means of production in ever "basic" sector of the economy, control of production by workers' councils, and freedom of expression in society.

Τhe New Left Current supports the notion that capitalism has evolved beyond what Lenin denoted as its uppermost, ultimate stage, that of imperialism, into a "totalitarian capitalism," a state of affairs that could not have been foreseen at the time, according to NAR's position, since "inter-state totalities," such as the European Union, did not yet exist.

== Elections: alliances and votes ==
Soon after its inception, the New Left Current has entered into co-operations and alliances, permanent or tactical/electoral, with other formations of the left.

In 1990, NAR participated in the general election as New Left Current – People's Opposition (Νέο Αριστερό Ρεύμα – Λαϊκή Αντιπολίτευση) and received 14,365 votes or 0,22% of the total. Ex-KKE Central Committee member Kostas Kappos was a prominent figure in the party's electoral campaign. In 1993, NAR joined the Left Struggle political coalition, along with the Revolutionary Communist Movement of Greece), the Communist Party of Greece (Marxist–Leninist), and the Workers' Revolutionary Party. The Struggle received 8,160 votes in 1993 and 10,443 votes in the 1996 general elections, or 0.11% and 0.21% respectively of the total. In December 1990, Kappos left NAR and, though he never officially returned to the Communist Party, he would declare he'd never left the KKE.

In 1999, NAR, the Revolutionary Communist Movement of Greece, and the Workers Revolutionary Party, along with other, smaller formations of the left, allied themselves as the Radical Left Front. Some ten years after, in 2009, the New Left Current participates in the broader coalition of ANTARSYA.

Various former NAR members became prominent figures in the Syriza party, some of them becoming ministers in the Suriza government as well, such as Nadia Valavani, Nikos Kotzias, Pavlos Polakis, and others. Foundational NAR member Kostas Kappos, one of the most heavily tortured prisoners of the Regime of the Colonels, enjoyed the respect of the Greek left's whole ideological spectrum, as shown by the expressions of mourning upon his 2005 death, such as the KKE obituary.

Election results

Results since 1990 (year links to election page)
| Year | Type of Election | Electoral coalition | Votes | % | Representatives |
|---|---|---|---|---|---|
| 1990 | Parliament | Popular Opposition | 14,365 | 0.21% | 0/300 |
| 1993 | Parliament | Left Struggle | 8,160 | 0.11% | 0/300 |
| 1994 | European Parliament | Left Movement Against EU | 14,006 | 0.21% | 0/25 |
| 1996 | Parliament | Left Struggle | 10,416 | 0.15% | 0/300 |
| 1999 | European Parliament | MERA^{1} | 10,884 | 0.17% | 0/25 |
| 2000 | Parliament | MERA | 8,183 | 0.11% | 0/300 |
| 2004 | Parliament | MERA | 11,285 | 0.15% | 0/300 |
| 2004 | European Parliament | MERA | 13,387 | 0.22% | 0/24 |
| 2007 | Parliament | MERA | 11,859 | 0.17% | 0/300 |
| 2009 | European Parliament | ANTARSYA^{2} | 21,951 | 0.43% | 0/22 |
| 2009 | Parliament | ANTARSYA | 24,737 | 0.36% | 0/300 |
| 2010 | Regional | ANTARSYA | 97,496 | 1.80% | 7/725 |
| 2012 | Parliament | ANTARSYA | 75,439 | 1.19% | 0/300 |
| 2012 | Parliament | ANTARSYA | 20.389 | 0,33% | 0/300 |
| 2014 | Regional | ANTARSYA | 128,154 | 2.27% | 9/703 |
| 2014 | European Parliament | ANTARSYA | 41,299 | 0.72% | 0/21 |
| 2015 | Parliament | ANTARSYA - MARS^{3} | 39,497 | 0.64% | 0/300 |
| 2015 | Parliament | ANTARSYA - EEK^{4} | 46,094 | 0.85% | 0/300 |
| 2019 | European Parliament | ANTARSYA | 36,327 | 0.64% | 0/21 |
| 2019 | Regional | ANTARSYA | 87,676 | 1.62% | 13/703 |
| 2019 | Parliament | ANTARSYA | 23,239 | 0.41% | 0/300 |
| May 2023 | Parliament | ANTARSYA | 31,746 | 0.54% | 0/300 |
| June 2023 | Parliament | ANTARSYA | 15,969 | 0.31% | 0/300 |

^{1} Radical Left Front
^{2} Anticapitalist Left Cooperation for the Overthrow
^{3} Left Front Coalition
^{4} Workers Revolutionary Party

| 1990, Parliament | 14,365 |
| 1993, Parliament | 8,160 |
| 1994, European Parliament | 14,006 |
| 1996, Parliament | 10,416 |
| 1999, European Parliament | 10,884 |
| 2000, Parliament | 8,133 |
| 2004, Parliament | 11,285 |
| 2004, European Parliament | 13,387 |
| 2007, Parliament | 11,895 |
| 2009, European Parliament | 21,951 |
| 2009, Parliament | 24,737 |
| 2010, Regional | 97,496 |
| 2012, Parliament | 75,439 |
| 2012, Parliament | 20,389 |
| 2014, Regional | 128,154 |
| 2014, European Parliament | 41,299 |
| 2015, Parliament | 39,497 |
| 2015, Parliament | 46,094 |

== Communist Liberation Youth ==
The New Left Current's youth organisation, the Communist Liberation Youth (Νεολαία Κομμουνιστική Απελευθέρωση, νΚΑ; nKA), founded in 1995 (as Κομμουνιστική Νεολαία Ελλάδας – Νέο Αριστερό Ρεύμα, KNE-ΝΑΡ; KNE-NAR). nKA, participates in the United Independent Left Movement, a coalition of left-wing student formations, and is active in the country's educational institutions.

By the 2010s, nKA has come to define itself as "politically autonomous."

== See also ==
- Revolutions of 1989
- List of political parties in Greece
