= United Anti-Capitalist Left =

United Anti-Capitalist Left Ενωτική Αντικαπιταλιστική Αριστερά
- Founded: 2007
- Dissolved: 2009
- Merged into: Front of the Greek Anticapitalist Left
- Ideology: Anti-capitalism

The United Anti-Capitalist Left (Greek: Ενωτική Αντικαπιταλιστική Αριστερά, ΕΝΑΝΤΙΑ; ENANTIA) was a coalition of far-left political parties in Greece.

The United Anti-Capitalist Left was founded in 2007 by Socialist Workers' Party, the Organization of Communist Internationalists of Greece–Spartacus, Left Recomposition (Aristeri Anasynthesi) and Left Anti-capitalist Group (Aristeri Antikapitalistiki Syspirosi).

On 22 March 2009, the United Anti-Capitalist Left and the Radical Left Front founded the Anticapitalist Left Cooperation for the Overthrow (ANTARSYA).

== See also ==
- Politics of Greece
- List of political parties in Greece
