= For our Crete =

For our Crete Για την Κρήτη μας
- Leader: Stavros Arnaoutakis
- Founded: 2010
- Headquarters: Eleftherias Square 29, Heraklion
- Ideology: Social democracy
- Political position: Centre-left
- National affiliation: PASOK
- European affiliation: Progressive Alliance of Socialists and Democrats
- Slogan: For our Crete, we continue
- Regional Council of Crete: 37 / 45

Website
- giatinkritimas.gr

For our Crete (Greek: Για την Κρήτη μας) is a social-democratic regional political association in Crete, Greece, led by Stavros Arnaoutakis. It is the de facto Cretan grouping of the Panhellenic Socialist Movement. The association has also previously received support from SYRIZA and New Democracy parties. For our Crete is considered the most successful regional political association in Crete, as it has won all regional elections since its formation.

== History ==
The association was founded to contest in the 2010 regional elections in Crete, as Crete - First Power. It won a majority of seats in the Regional Council and Stavros Arnaoutakis was elected Regional Governor for the first time. In the 2014 regional elections, it won a plurality of votes in the first round and Arnaoutakis defeated New Democracy's candidate in the second round, thus securing a second term as Governor. In 2019, the association was renamed Crete - Our Life and won 60% of the vote, securing a majority in the Regional Council in the first round. For the 2023 elections, the association adopted its current name, For our Crete, and won a landslide victory in the first round with 78% of the vote, resulting in Arnaoutakis' re-election for a fourth term.

== Political positions ==
The association broadly promotes a social-democratic programme for the island's development and growth. According to their 2023 manifesto, the association is focused on supporting Cretan agriculture, tourism and protecting the environment of the island. It also includes measures for promoting sports, culture and social cohesion. The manifesto includes provisions for supporting Cretan entrepreneurship and investment in new technologies.

== Election results ==
=== Regional Council of Crete ===
Regional Council of Crete
Election	Leading candidate	Votes	%	Seats	+/–	Governorship
2010	Stavros Arnaoutakis	165,726	50.30 (#1)	31 / 51	—	Yes
2014 (second round)	Stavros Arnaoutakis	184,154	64,01 (#1)	31 / 51	—	Yes
2019	Stavros Arnaoutakis	202,802	60,82 (#1)	31 / 51	—	Yes
2023	Stavros Arnaoutakis	245,219	78,41 (#1)	37 / 45	6	Yes
