= Organization of Communist Internationalists of Greece–Spartacus =

- Founded: 1985
- Split from: Organisation of Internationalist Communists of Greece
- Headquarters: 71 E. Benaki, 10681, Athens
- Newspaper: Spartakos
- Youth wing: Youth of the Organization of Communist Internationalists of Greece–Spartacus
- Ideology: Communism; Socialism; Trotskyism
- Political position: Far-left
- National affiliation: Anticapitalist Left Cooperation for the Overthrow
- International affiliation: Fourth International
- Colours: Red

Website
- okde.org

The Organization of Communist Internationalists of Greece–Spartacus or OKDE–Spartacus (Greek: Οργάνωση Κομμουνιστών Διεθνιστών Ελλάδας - Σπάρτακος (ΟΚΔΕ-Σπάρτακος), Organosi Kommouniston Diethniston Kommouniston Elladas - Spartakos) is a Trotskyist group in Greece. It is the Greek section of the Fourth International, and takes the name Spartacus (Σπάρτακος) from its magazine, which has been in various the name of the Fourth Internationalist journal in Greece.

== Elections ==
In the 2007 Greek legislative election it was a central component in the United Anti-Capitalist Left electoral coalition. Since 2009 it has been a member of Front of the Greek Anticapitalist Left (ANTARSYA) coalition.

In the Greek legislative election, 2012 it broke with the Executive Bureau of the Fourth International which decided to switch support from ANTARSYA to Syriza. According to the section's Central Committee: "Unfortunately we realize with anguish that the Fourth International is not capable of playing the role it should play in this historical period and we wonder where we are going…" The Greek section has since helped to form the "Revolutionary Marxists" faction in the Fourth International.
