= List of mayors of Thessaloniki =

Mayor of Thessaloniki
- Δήμαρχος Θεσσαλονίκης
- logo of the City of Thessaloniki

- Municipal Flag of Thessaloniki

- Incumbent; Stelios Angeloudis since 1 January 2024
- Appointer: Electorate of the Municipality of Thessaloniki
- Term length: Five years (since 2024); renewable
- Inaugural holder: Osman Said Bey
- Formation: 26 October 1912; 113 years ago
- Website: www.thessaloniki.gr

The Mayor of Thessaloniki is the head of the Municipality of Thessaloniki, the most populated municipality in the Thessaloniki Urban Area and centre of the urban area, which constitutes the "City of Thessaloniki".

The current mayor of the city, since January 2024, is Stelios Angeloudis.

== History ==
Ottoman period

- Suleyman Sudi Bey (1869)
- Anchiach Effendi (1870)
- Ahmed Rauf (1871-1874)
- Mehmet Pasha (1874)
- Faik Bey (1875)
- Mehmet Tefik (1876)
- Akif Bey (1877)
- Arif Bey (1878-1880)
- Shukri Bey (1880-1882)
- Ali Orfi Effendi (1882)
- Ali Effendi Musa Zade (1882-1884)
- Ali Effendi (1884)
- Arif Bey (1885)
- Ibrahim Bey (1886-1889)
- Ibrahim Namik Bey (1889-1893)
- Ahmed Hamdi Bey (1893-1895)
- Reis Bekili Kerim Bey (1895-1897)
- Reis Bekili Hasan Husni Effendi (1897-1901)
- Ahmed Hamdi Bey (1901-1907)
- Tevfik Bey (1907)
- Ahmed Hamdi Bey (1907-1908)
- Osman Adil Bey (1908)
- Hulusi Bey (1908)
- Osman Said Ibn Haki Bey (1908-1909)
- Ismail Effendi (1909-1910)
- Tevfik Bey (1910-1912)

Modern period

- Osman Said Bey (1912-1916)
- Konstantinos Aggelakis (18 August 1916 – 15 November 1920)
- Osman Said Bey (15 November 1920 – 22 September 1922)
- Athanasios Kallidopoulos (22 Σεπτεμβρίου 1922-8 Δεκεμβρίου 1922)
- Petros Syndikas (1922 – 1926)
- Georgios Zaroukas (20 June 1926 – 28 February 1926)
- Minas Patrikios (1926-1929) with pauses due to dictatorial persecutions - dismissed by the dictatorial regime of Theodoros Pangalos
- Nikolaos Manos (August 1929-19 October 1930)
- Charisios Vamvakas (1931-1933)
- Nikolaos Manos (1934-1 April 1936)
- Konstantinos Merkouriou (1 April 1937 – 22 February 1943) appointed by the dictatorial regime 1937-41 and then by the Nazi authorities 1941-43.
- George Seremetis (23 February 1943 – 28 October 1944) appointed by the Nazi authorities.
- Dimitrios Kavvadas(November 1944-January 1945)
- Petros Levis (28 February 1945 – 29 May 1946)
- Christos Konstantinou (29 May 1946 – 23 August 1950)
- Ioannis Manesis (23 August 1950 – 7 June 1951)
- Aristi Pagiataki (June 1, 1951-7 June 1951), The first elected Mayor in the 1951 elections - she was dismissed and became a simple municipal councilor after a legal appeal of Petrakakis (who was elected 2nd) due to a vague law for women mayors.
- Pantelis Petrakakis (1951-1955), Second in votes in the 1951 elections - he was sworn in after Pagiataki's dismissal following his own legal appeal.
- Minas Patrikios (1956-1959)
- Ioannis Papailiakis (1959-1964)
- Konstantinos Tsiros (1964-1967)
- Vyron Antoniadis (5 August 1967 – 12 April 1968) appointed by dictatorial regime
- Alexandros Konstantinidis (12 April 1968 – 8 February 1970) appointed by dictatorial regime
- Christos Floridis (8 February 1970 – 30 August 1974) appointed by dictatorial regime

== Third Hellenic Republic (1974–present) ==
Mayor		Took office	Left office	Party	Coalition
50	Dimitrios Zannas (1920 – 2013)	30 August 1974	24 September 1974	Independent	Independents; 1974
51	Stergios Vallas (1926 – 2003)	24 September 1974	1 June 1975	Independent	Independents; 1974 – 1975
52	Michalis Papadopoulos (1918 – 1982)	1 June 1975	6 February 1982	PASOK	PASOK; 1975 – 1982
53	Kostis Moskof (1939 – 1998)	6 February 1982	17 February 1982	Independent	Independents; 1982
54	Athanasios Giannousis (1917 – 2005)	17 February 1982	31 December 1982	KKE	KKE; 1982
55	Theocharis Manavis (1916 – 1998)	1 January 1983	31 December 1986	PASOK	PASOK; 1983 – 1986
56	Sotiris Kouvelas (born 1936)	1 January 1987	18 June 1989	New Democracy	New Democracy; 1987 – 1989
57	Konstantinos Kosmopoulos (1928 – 2011)	18 June 1989	19 March 1998	New Democracy	New Democracy; 1989 – 1998
58	Dimitris Dimitriadis	19 March 1998	31 December 1998	New Democracy	New Democracy; 1998
59	Vasilis Papageorgopoulos (born 1947)	1 January 1999	31 December 2010	New Democracy	New Democracy; 1999 – 2010
60	Yiannis Boutaris (1942 – 2024)	1 January 2011	31 August 2019	PASOK	PASOK – Democratic Left – Drassi – Ecologist Greens; 2011 – 2019
61	Konstantinos Zervas (born 1964)	1 September 2019	31 December 2023	New Democracy	New Democracy; 2019 – 2023
62	Stelios Angeloudis (born 1959)	1 January 2024	Incumbent	PASOK – Movement for Change	PASOK – Movement for Change; 2024 – present

== Sources ==
- "Liste of Turkish mayors of Thessaloniki" (PDF) (in Turkish).
