= Ryaki, Kozani =

Ryaki Ρυάκι
- Community
- Location within Greece
- Coordinates: 40°24.408′N 21°56.4205′E
- Country: Greece
- Administrative region: West Macedonia
- Regional unit: Kozani
- Municipality: Kozani
- Municipal unit: Ellispontos

Area
  - Community: 18.149 km^{2} (7.007 sq mi)
- Elevation: 760 m (2,490 ft)

Population (2021)
  - Community: 183
  - Density: 10.1/km^{2} (26.1/sq mi)
- Time zone: UTC+2 (EET)
  - Summer (DST): UTC+3 (EEST)
- Postal code: 501 50
- Area code: +30-2461
- Vehicle registration: ΚΖ

Ryaki (Greek: Ρυάκι) is a village and a community of the Kozani municipality. Before the 2011 local government reform it was part of the municipality of Ellispontos, of which it was a municipal district. The 2021 census recorded 183 inhabitants in the community. The community of Tetralofo covers an area of 18.149 km^{2}.

== People ==
- Kostas Peletidis (1953-), Greek cardiologist and Mayor of Patras

== See also ==
List of settlements in the Kozani regional unit
