= Fanis Spanos =

Greek politician

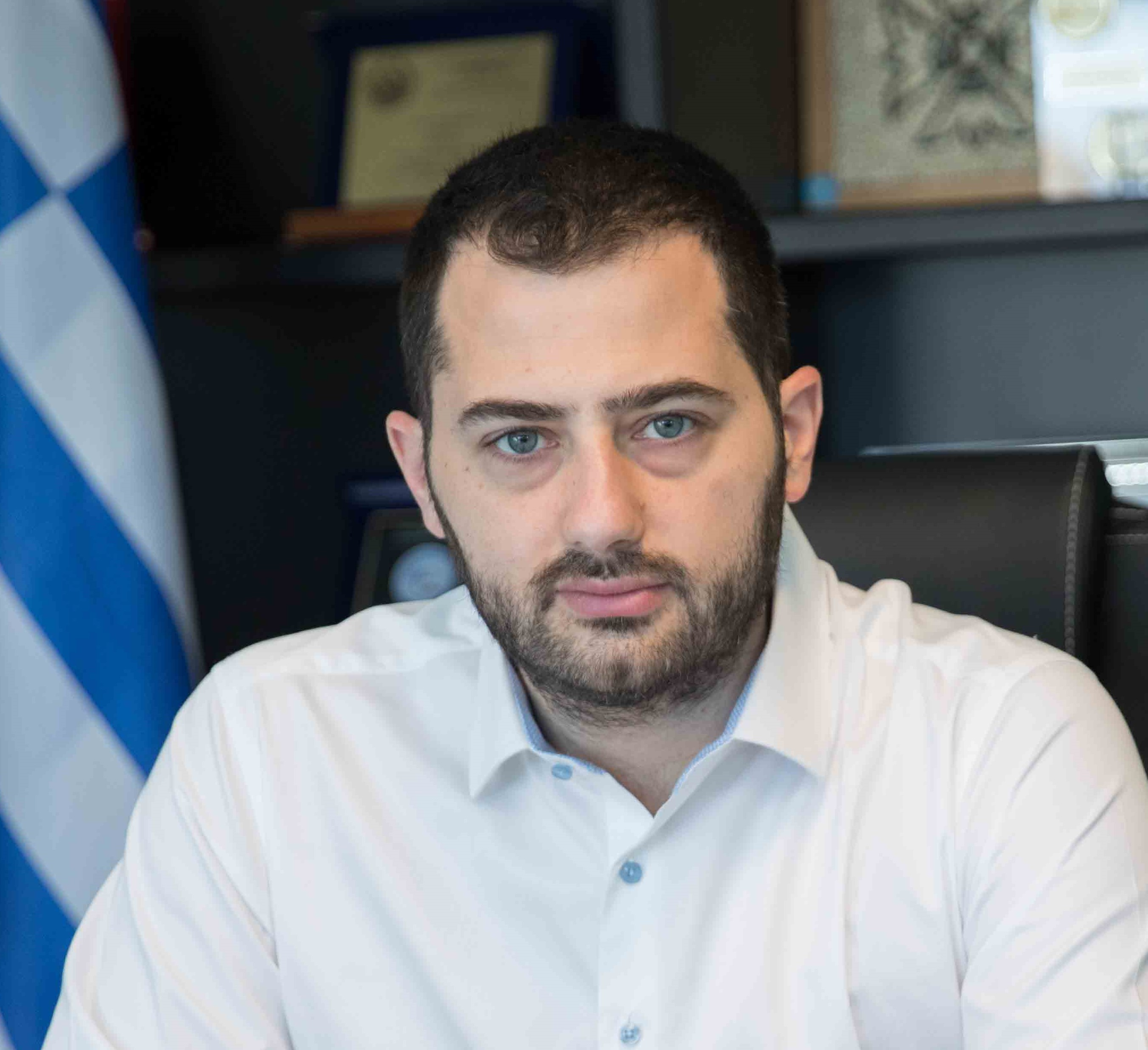
Spanos in 2020

Fanis Spanos (Greek: Φάνης Σπανός; born 28 January 1984) is a Greek politician and regional governor of Central Greece. First elected governor in 2019, he was re-elected in 2023. He previously served under his predecessor Kostas Bakoyannis as deputy governor for Euboea between 2014 and 2019.
