= Konstantinos Zervas =

Greek businessman and politician

- Κωνσταντίνος Ζέρβας
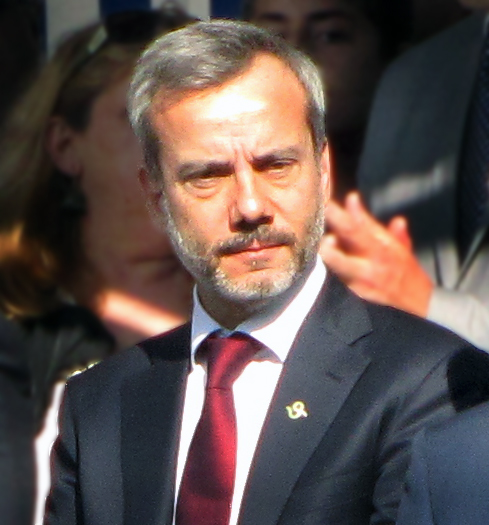
- Zervas in 2019

61st Mayor of Thessaloniki
- In office 1 September 2019 – 31 December 2023
- Deputy: See list: Charis Aidonopoulos (2019–2021); Maria Karagianni (2022–2023)
- Preceded by: Yiannis Boutaris
- Succeeded by: Stelios Angeloudis

Deputy Mayor of Thessaloniki
- In office 1 January 2013 – 18 February 2015
- Mayor: Yiannis Boutaris

Personal details
- Born: 10 May 1964 (age 62) Thessaloniki, Greece
- Party: New Democracy
- Education: Aristotle University of Thessaloniki
- Profession: Politician; Civil Engineer

Konstantinos Zervas (Greek: Κωνσταντίνος Ζέρβας; born 10 May 1964) is a Greek civil engineer and politician who served as the 61st Mayor of Thessaloniki from 2019 to 2023. From 2013 to 2015 he served as First Deputy Mayor under Yiannis Boutaris.

== Biography ==
=== Early life ===
Konstantinos Zervas was born in Thessaloniki in 1964. He is the son of Vasilis Zervas—a civil engineer—and Lilika Zerva-Ologa—a philologist. He has two older sisters. His maternal great grandmother was born in Korçë, she moved to Skopje where she met his great grandfather and that is where his grandfather was born also.

Zervas attended the German School of Thessaloniki and the Experimental School of Thessaloniki. He graduated from the Department of Civil Engineering of the Aristotle University of Thessaloniki and received a Masters of Science from Brown University in 1989.

=== Political career ===
He was a member of the board of directors of Attiko Metro SA between 2010 and 2016.

In 2011 Zervas became the City Councilor and Deputy mayor for the environment, quality of life and Free Space. In the calendar year of 2014 he got re-elected but instead got the position as a Citizen's Mobility, Youth and Sport deputy. Zervas exited his position in 2015 due to disagreements in major policies.

In 2019 Zervas was elected mayor of Thessaloniki. He received 66.82% of the votes, while his opponent Nikos Tahiaos received 33.18% of the votes. In 2019 he authored a book called "Thoughts for Thessaloniki and politics". In 2019, Zervas used nationalistic rhetoric regarding the Macedonian name dispute to win electoral power through the votes of those against the Prespa Agreement. In 2013 he was elected as a member of the Central Representation of the Technical Chamber of Greece and the regional department of Central Macedonia.

In 2023 Zervas won the first round of the municipal election receiving 27.3% of the vote. But he lost the second round by a landslide victory from Stelios Angeloudis with Angeloudis receiving 67% of the vote to Zervas' 32%.
