= Kostas Kappos =

Greek politician

- Born: March 1937; Kefalovriso, Argolis, Greece
- Died: September 2005 (aged 68); Athens, Greece

Kostas Kappos (Greek: Κώστας Κάππος; March 1937 – September 2005) was an important Greek communist.

During the military junta he was arrested and sent to Lakki in Leros, where he was tortured. He was set free in 1971. In 1972 he became a member of the Office of the Central Secretariat of the Communist Youth of Greece, and in 1973 a member of the Central Committee of the Communist Party of Greece. In 1974 he was arrested again, then set free after the Junta's fall. In the elections of 1974, the first where the Communist Party was allowed to stand after the Greek Civil War, he won a seat in the Greek Parliament, and in 1975 he testified at the Greek Junta Trials.

He was elected a member of the CC of the CP of Greece in every Congress until June 1989. In 1989, he expressed his disagreement with CPG's decision to form a joint government with the conservative party of New Democracy and he participated in the formation of a new organisation named New Left Current, where he was elected member of its 31-member Committee.

He wrote nine books and also contributed to the communist theory with his essays. Kappos' core idea about the construction of Socialism is developed in his book "Criticism of the Soviet formation".

Until his death Kostas Kappos was sending part of his Parliament retirement pension to Fidel Castro and the Cuban government as "help to the Cuban revolution".
