= Mevgal =

Greek dairy company

ΜΕΒΓΑΛ
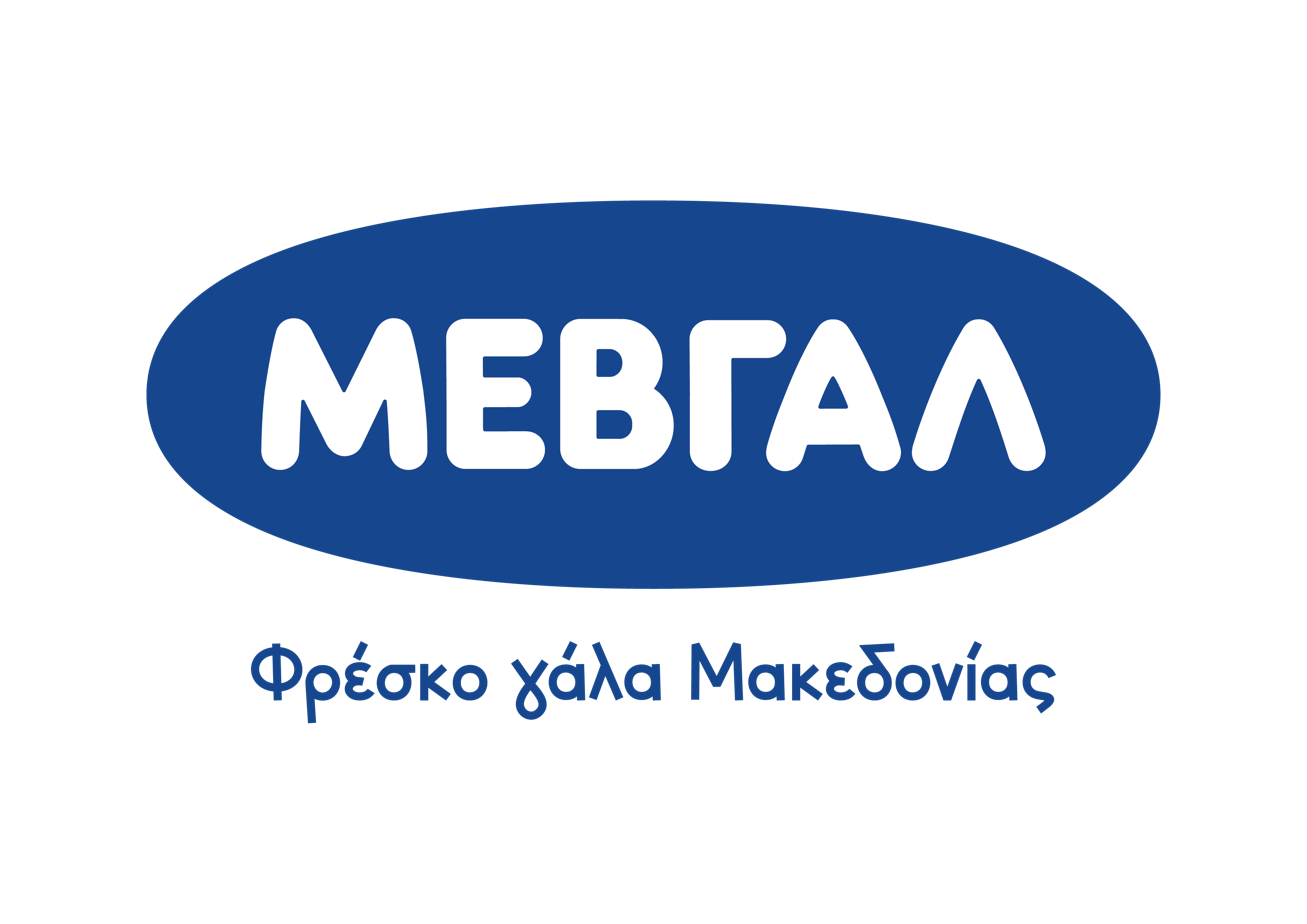
- Native name: Μακεδονική Βιομηχανία Γάλακτος
- Romanized name: MEVGAL
- Industry: Food
- Founded: 1950
- Headquarters: Koufalia, Macedonia, Greece
- Products: Dairy products
- Revenue: €129.643 million (2021)
- Operating income: €1.575 million (2021)
- Net income: €1.411 million (2021)
- Total assets: €102.725 million (2021)
- Total equity: €6.605 million (2021)

MEVGAL (Macedonian Milk Industry) is a Greek brand of dairy products company, the largest in Macedonia and the third largest producer of fresh dairy products in Greece. Its name is an acronym for Macedonian Milk Industry (Greek: Μακεδονική Βιομηχανία Γάλακτος, ΜΕΒΓΑΛ). It is headquartered in Koufalia in the Thessaloniki regional unit. It manufactures dairy products that include yogurt, cheese and dairy-based desserts which total up to 170 individual products.

MEVGAL was founded in 1950 in Macedonia where 67% of Greece's fresh cow milk is produced. Its workforce consists of around 1,200 people. It purchases its raw products from up to 1,600 local farms based exclusively in Greece's north province of Macedonia. Its main market is through the local Greek outlets but it also exports to 23 countries around the world.

Since 2003 it expanded in the production of fruit juices and fruit drinks.

== Logo ==
Its logo has a blue circle with its name emblazoned across it in white Greek letters.

== Products ==
- Beautiful - yogurt
- Harmony - low-fat yogurt range
- Makedoniko - cheese brand since 1965
- Feta Mevgal - Feta cheese & more
- Regular Milk - with 3,5% fats
- Low Fats Milk - with 1,5% fats
- Mevgal Maniacs - yogurt for children
- Mevgal Maniacs Milky-Cakes - kinda like Kinder Γαλακτοφέτες
