= Apostolos Tzitzikostas =

Greek politician (born 1978)

- Απόστολος Τζιτζικώστας
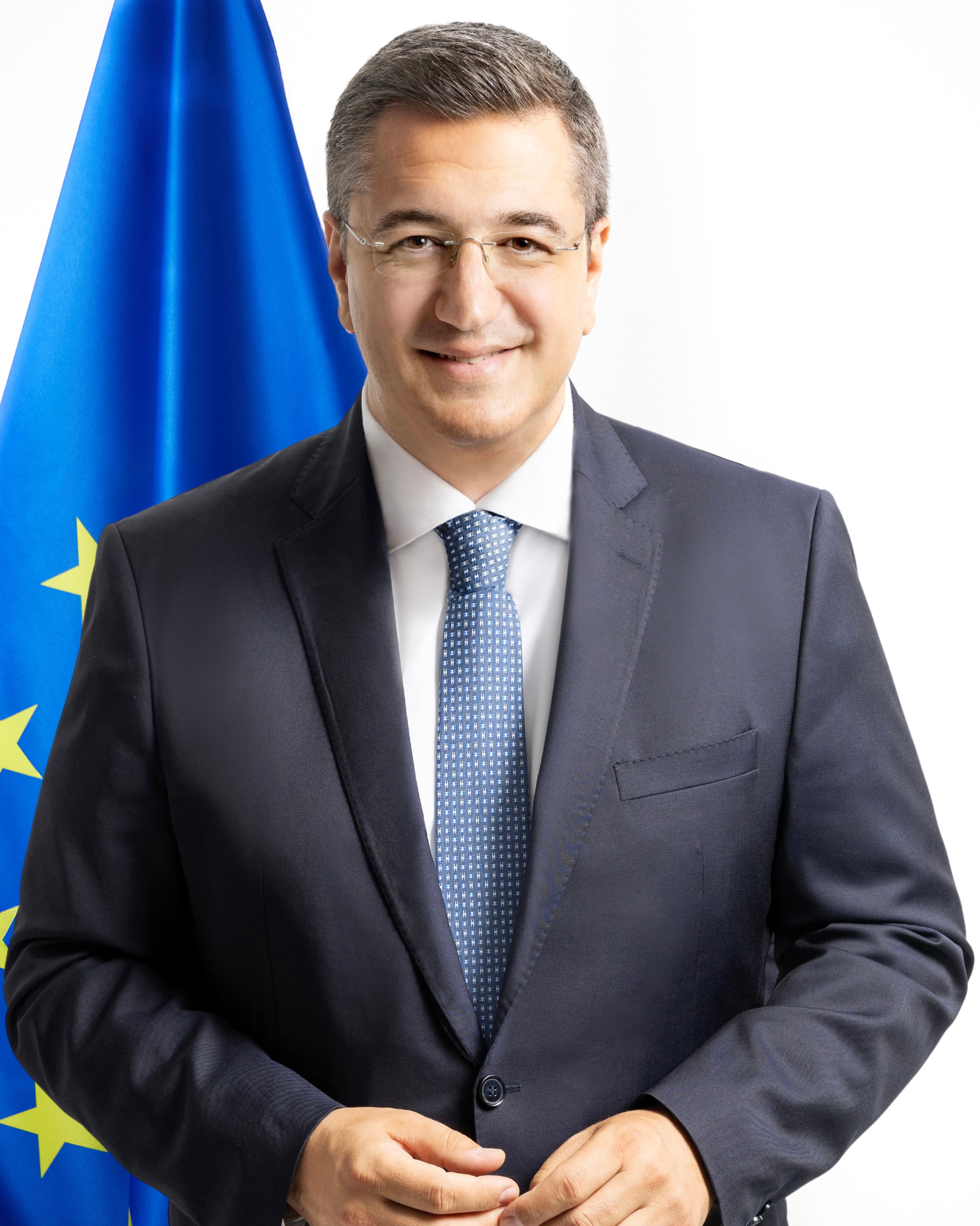
- Official portrait, 2024

European Commissioner for Sustainable Transport and Tourism
- Incumbent
- Assumed office 1 December 2024
- Commission: Von der Leyen II
- Preceded by: Adina Vălean

Regional Governor of Central Macedonia
- In office 1 January 2013 – 2 December 2024
- Preceded by: Panagiotis Psomiadis
- Succeeded by: Nana Aidona
European Committee of the Regions roles 2017–2022
President of the European Committee of the Regions
In office 12 February 2020 – 29 June 2022
Preceded by	Karl-Heinz Lambertz
Succeeded by	Vasco Cordeiro
Vice President of the European Committee of the Regions
In office 12 July 2017 – 12 February 2020
President	Karl-Heinz Lambertz

Deputy Regional Governor of Central Macedonia
- In office 1 January 2011 – 1 January 2013
- Preceded by: Position established
- Succeeded by: Giorgos Tsamaslis

Member of the Hellenic Parliament
- In office 16 September 2007 – 7 September 2009
- Constituency: Thessaloniki A

Personal details
- Born: Apostolos Ioannis Tzitzikostas; 2 September 1978 (age 48) Thessaloniki, Greece
- Party: New Democracy
- Education: Georgetown University; University College London
- Occupation: Politician; Political scientist

Apostolos Ioannis Tzitzikostas (Greek: Απόστολος Τζιτζικώστας, pronounced [aˈpostolos d͜zid͜ziˈkostas]; born 2 September 1978) is a Greek politician who has served as the European Commissioner for Sustainable Transport and Tourism since 2024. He previously served as governor of the region of Central Macedonia from 2013 to 2024 and was formerly president of the European Committee of the Regions from 2020 until 2022.

== Biography ==
=== Education and business career ===
Of Aromanian origins, Tzitzikostas studied politics and diplomacy at Georgetown University and worked at the office of the Chair of the United States House Committee on Foreign Affairs. Following his graduation in Public Policy and Economics at the University College of London, he returned to Greece. In 2001 he created his own company selling organic dairy products called 'MACEDONIAN FARM', which was later marketed by Mevgal. From 2003 until 2007 he served as CEO.

=== Political career ===
In the national elections of September 2007, he was elected Member of the Greek Parliament with the Nea Demokratia party in the 1st Electoral District of Thessaloniki. As MP, he served as Secretary of the Hellenic Parliament, member of the Standing Committee on National Defense and Foreign Affairs, and member of the Standing Committee on Financial Affairs. Additionally, he was a member of the Special Standing Committee on European Community Affairs and the Special Committee for the Reform Treaty of the European Union. He represented the Hellenic Parliament in the Euro-Mediterranean Parliamentary Assembly from 2007 to 2009.

In the regional elections of November 2010, he was elected Deputy Governor of Central Macedonia and Head of the Thessaloniki Regional Unit, and in the regional elections of May 2014, he was elected Governor of Central Macedonia with 71% of the vote. He was re-elected as Governor of Central Macedonia in the regional elections of May 2019 and October 2023, receiving over 60% of the vote in both elections.

In November 2019, he was elected President of the Association of Greek Regions and was unanimously re-elected President in February 2024, for the first time in the institution's history.

Since 2015, he has been a member of the European Committee of the Regions, and in July 2017, he was elected Head of the Greek Delegation. In February 2020, he was unanimously elected by all political groups President of the European Committee of the Regions. In July 2022, he was also unanimously elected First Vice-President of the European Committee of the Regions.

In August 2024 the Greek government nominated Tzitzikostas as the country’s European Commissioner in the von der Leyen Commission II.
