= Thessaloniki (municipality) =

Municipality of Macedonia, Greece

Municipality of Thessaloniki Δήμος Θεσσαλονίκης
- Municipality
- Flag Seal

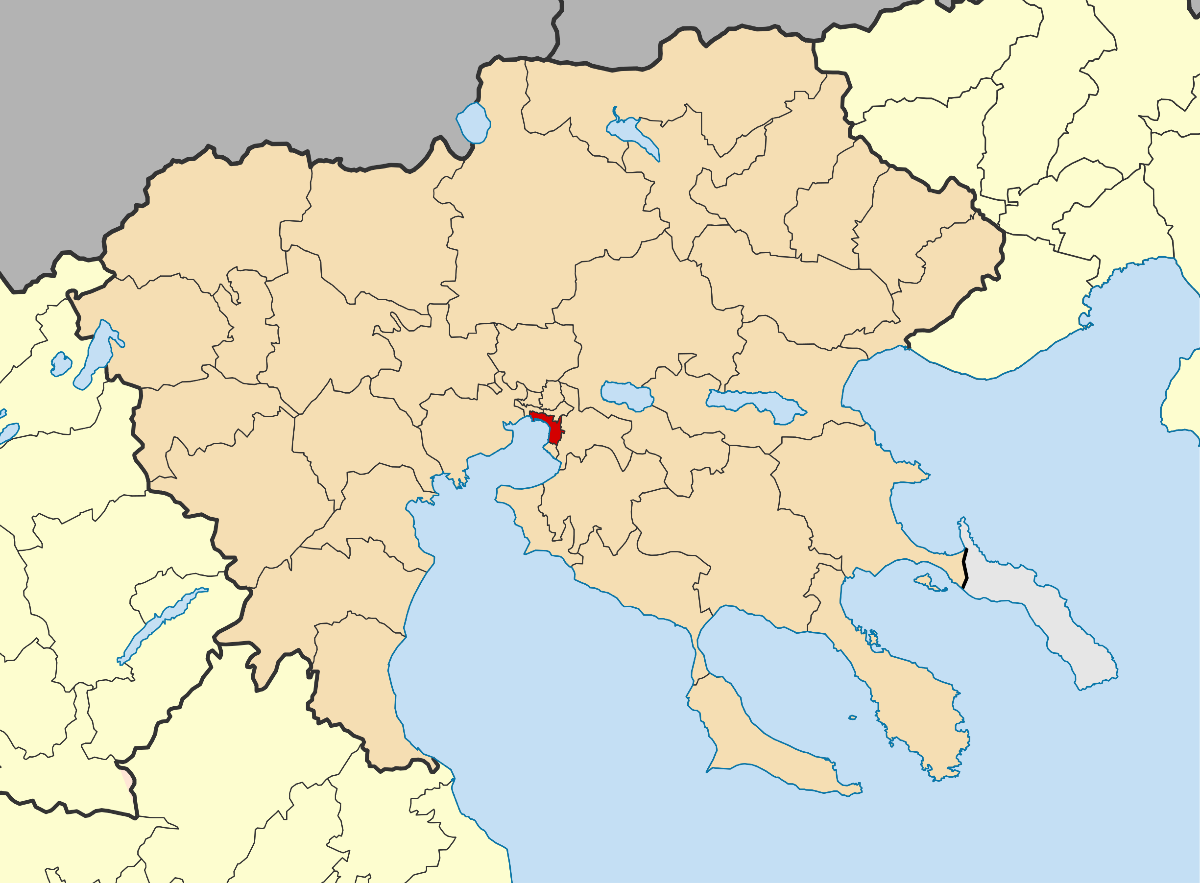

- Location within Greece
- Coordinates: 40°38′N 22°57′E
- Country: Greece
- Geographic region: Macedonia
- Administrative region: Central Macedonia
- Regional unit: Thessaloniki

Government
  - Mayor: Stelios Angeloudis (since 2024)

Area
  - Municipality: 19.307 km^{2} (7.454 sq mi)

Population (2021)
  - Municipality: 319,045
  - Density: 16,525/km^{2} (42,799/sq mi)
- Time zone: UTC+2 (EET)
  - Summer (DST): UTC+3 (EEST)
- Website: http://www.thessaloniki.gr/

The Municipality of Thessaloniki (Greek: Δήμος Θεσσαλονίκης, Dímos Thessaloníkis) is the second largest municipality by population in Greece after the Municipality of Athens. According to the 2021 Greek census, it has a population of 319,045 inhabitants. The municipality includes the historical center (including the majority of the city's monuments) and about one third of the Thessaloniki Urban Area.

== History ==
The Municipality of Thessaloniki was founded in 1869, one year after the foundation of the Municipality of Istanbul. The first mayor of the city was the Ottoman Suleiman Sundi. Another notable mayor of the Ottoman era was Ahmed Hamdi Bey Galizade (1893–1895, 1901–1907, 1907–1908) while the last Muslim mayor was Osman Sait Bey (1912–1916, 1920–1922), who remained in office until the Greek–Turkish population exchange. The first Greek mayor of Thessaloniki was Konstantinos Angelakis (1916–1920), while the current mayor of the city is Stelios Angeloudis who assumed office on 1 January 2024.

== Division ==
The Municipality is divided in six municipal districts; First which includes the historical centre of the city, the Thessaloniki International Fair's, the University's regions etc., Second which includes suburbs such as Vardari and Xirokrini, Third (Eptapyrgio and Ano Poli) Fourth (Toumba), Fifth (Nea Elvetia, Charilaou, Analipsi etc.) and the former municipality of Triandria.

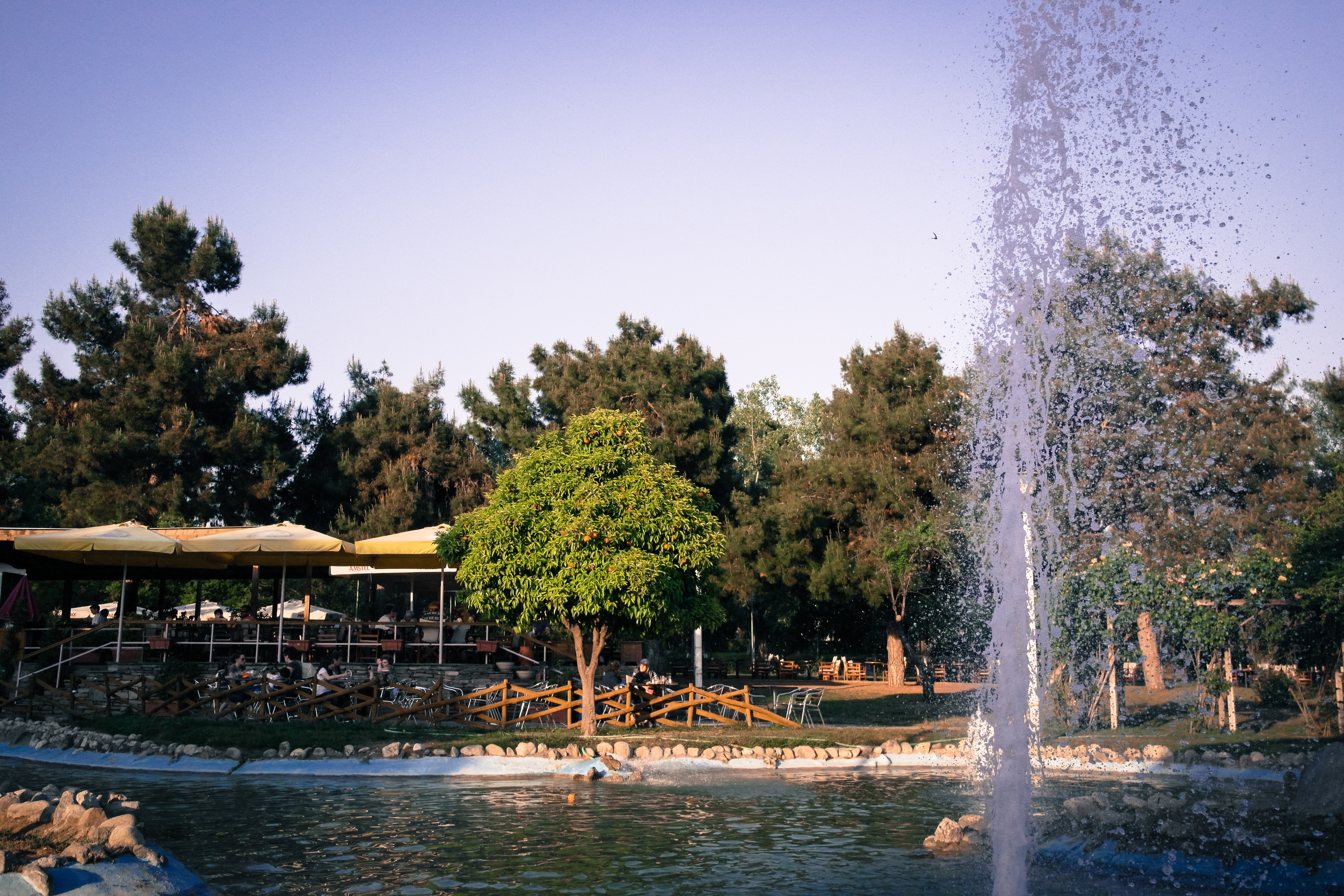
Pedion tou Areos municipal park

== Culture ==
The Municipality of Thessaloniki owns the management of several culture sites. The Municipal Art Gallery, the Municipal Theatre Aneton, the History Center of Thessaloniki (el), Vafopouleion (el), the Culture Centre of Western Thessaloniki, Alaca Imaret, Yeni Cami, Villa Petridi and also several local libraries are under the administration of the municipality.

Other culture foundations within the municipality are the Archaeological Museum, the Art Gallery of the Society for Macedonian Studies, the Jewish Museum, the Museum of Photography, the Museum of Byzantine Culture etc.

Municipality of Thessaloniki owns one television channel (TV 100) and three radio stations (FM 100, FM 100,6 and FM 101).

== Monuments ==
The Municipality of Thessaloniki includes within its borders the majority of city's ancient, Byzantine, Ottoman and modern landmarks and monuments. Some of them are the Arch of Galerius and Rotunda, the Byzantine Bath of the Upper Town, the Basilica of St Demetrios, the White Tower of Thessaloniki, Villa Bianca, Ladadika, the Alaca Imaret Mosque, the OTE Tower etc.
