= Radical Left Front =

Radical Left Front Μέτωπο Ριζοσπαστικής Αριστεράς
- Founded: 1999
- Dissolved: 2009
- Preceded by: Left Struggle
- Merged into: Front of the Greek Anticapitalist Left
- Ideology: Communism; Marxism–Leninism; Anti-capitalism; Eco-socialism
- Political position: Far-left
- Colours: Red

The Radical Left Front (Greek: Μέτωπο Ριζοσπαστικής Αριστεράς (ΜΕΡΑ), Metopo Rizospastikis Aristeras, MERA) was a coalition of political organizations and parties of the anti-capitalist, communist Left in Greece.

The Radical Left Front was founded in 1999 by New Left Current (NAR), the Maoist Revolutionary Communist Movement of Greece (EKKE), the Trotskyist Workers Revolutionary Party (EEK), Youth of Communist Liberation (NKA), Independent Communist Organization of Serres (AKOS) and independent left activists. In 2004, Alternative Ecologists affiliated itself to the Front. In March 2009, all components of ME.R.A. except for the E.E.K., together with the components of EN.ANTI.A. and unaffiliated fighters, founded ANT.AR.SY.A. After the formation of ANT.AR.SY.A., ME.RA.A. was destroyed.

== Participating parties ==
The parties that participated in the front were the following:

Party	Ideology	Leadership
New Left Current	Marxism–Leninism	central committee
Revolutionary Communist Movement of Greece	Maoism	central committee
Workers Revolutionary Party	Trotskyism	central committee
Alternative Ecologists	Eco-socialism	central committee
Organisation of Internationalist Communists of Greece	Trotskyism	central committee

== Electoral results ==
Results since 1999 (year links to election page)
Year	Type of Election	Votes	%	Mandates
1999	European Parliament	10,930	0.17%	—
2000	Parliament	8,132	0.12%	—
2004	Parliament	11,261	0.15%	—
2004	European Parliament	13,387	0.22%	—
2007	Parliament	11,859	0.17%	—

== See also ==
- Politics of Greece
- List of political parties in Greece
- List of Communist Parties
