= Stelios Angeloudis =

Greek lawyer and politician

- Στέλιος Αγγελούδης
- Angeloudis in 2026

62nd Mayor of Thessaloniki
- Incumbent
- Assumed office 1 January 2024
- Deputy: See list: Vasilis Gakis (2024–present)
- Preceded by: Konstantinos Zervas

Personal details
- Born: 26 November 1959 (age 66) Thessaloniki, Greece
- Party: PASOK – Movement for Change
- Education: Aristotle University of Thessaloniki; Military Corps Officers Academy
- Profession: Politician; Lawyer

Stelios Angeloudis (born in Thessaloniki, November 26, 1959) is a Greek politician and lawyer who has served as the 62nd mayor of Thessaloniki since January 2024.

== Background and Career ==
He was born in the Upper Town (Ano Poli) of Thessaloniki, where he still lives today. He graduated in law from the Military Officers’ Corps School. In 1985, he obtained his second degree in Law with a specialization in Public Law, from the Aristotle University of Thessaloniki.

He served as legal counsel to ERT3, the Hellenic television broadcaster. He also served as Special Secretary for Sports of Macedonia–Thrace at the Ministry of Culture, and as Secretary General for Commerce at the Ministry of Development. He also served for ten years as president of the Hellenic Handball Federation. In 2001, he joined the Hellenic Olympic Committee as an executive representative. He was a founder of both the National Olympic Academy and the Thessaloniki Olympic Museum.

During his tenure in these positions, he was responsible for the creation of numerous sports facilities in Thessaloniki, most notably the Poseidonio Sports Center and KAPPA, which is described as the only sports and cultural center in Europe for people with disabilities.

He also served as an appointed adviser in the organization of the 2004 Summer Olympics in Athens, Greece.

In 2010, he assumed the positions of chair and chief executive officer of the Thessaloniki Port Authority (OLTH).

== Political Life ==
He served as director of the office of Evangelos Venizelos, a long-serving Member of Parliament representing Thessaloniki and Deputy Prime Minister of Greece.

In the 2023 Thessaloniki municipal elections, he ran for Mayor of Thessaloniki with the Independent municipal coalition Team for Thessaloniki (Omada gia ti Thessaloniki). In the first round, he finished second behind incumbent mayor Konstantinos Zervas, who was backed by the conservative governing New Democracy party, receiving 25.74% of the vote, or 24,572 votes. In the second round, however, he won decisively with 67.33% of the vote, or 50,305 votes.

During his tenure as mayor, the Thessaloniki Metro was inaugurated in 2024. He has also expressed support for complementary forms of urban public transportation, including a tram system, urban water transit, and trolley buses.

== Personal Life ==
He is married to Vicky Tsomakou and has two children.
