= Antarsya =

Political coalition in Greece

Anticapitalist Left Cooperation for the Overthrow Αντικαπιταλιστική Αριστερή Συνεργασία για την Ανατροπή
- Abbreviation: ANTARSYA; ΑΝΤΑΡΣΥΑ
- Founded: 22 March 2009
- Merger of: Radical Left Front; United Anti-Capitalist Left
- Student wing: Attack
- Ideology: Anti-capitalism; Anti-fascism; Socialism; Euroscepticism
- Political position: Left-wing to far-left
- Colours: Red
- Hellenic Parliament: 0 / 300
- European Parliament: 0 / 21
- Regional councillors: 0 / 611

Party flag
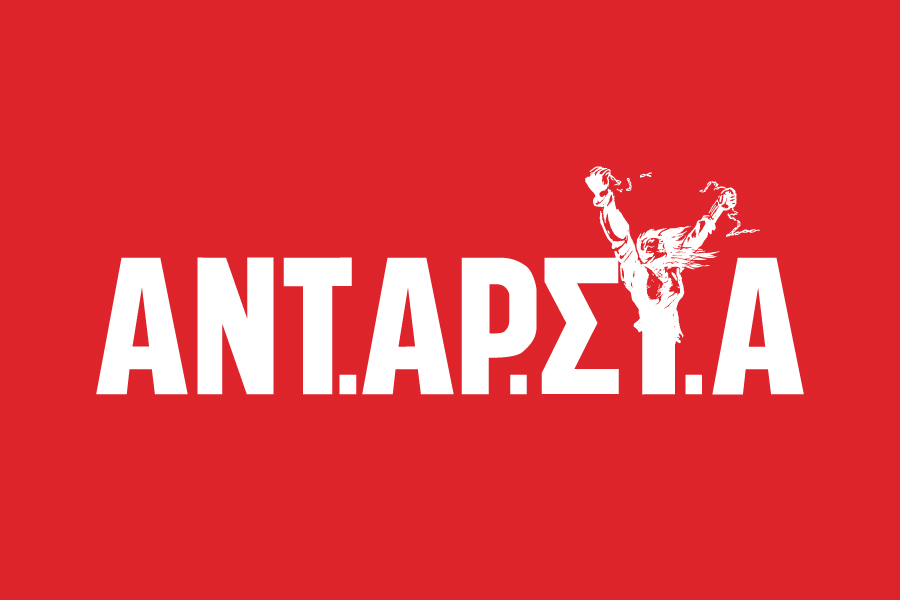

Website
- antarsya.gr

The Anticapitalist Left Cooperation for the Overthrow (Greek: Αντικαπιταλιστική Αριστερή Συνεργασία για την Ανατροπή, romanized: Antikapitalistiki Aristeri Synergasia gia tin Anatropi), better known domestically by the abbreviation ANTARSYA (Note: The Greek word "ανταρσία", with the same pronunciation as ανταρσύα, means "mutiny", "rebellion".) (ΑΝΤΑΡΣΥΑ), is a coalition of radical-left political organisations in Greece.

== Foundation ==
ANTARSYA was founded on 22 March 2009 in Athens by organisations and independent militants with origins in the now-defunct coalitions of the Radical Left Front (MERA) and the United Anti-Capitalist Left (ENANTIA). As a member of the latter, the Trotskyist organization Workers Revolutionary Party objected to the foundation of such a coalition and left ENANTIA. (Note: A few years later, ANTARSYA and the Workers Revolutionary Party formed an electoral alliance for the 2015 general elections.)

The Organisation of Internationalist Communists of Greece, a Trotskyist party, participated in the foundation but left after a few weeks, on 18 May 2009, citing objections to what it perceived as the coalition "reformist" focus on parliamentary politics and to the invocation in the foundational document of historical events on which Trotskyists have a very different view.

== Members ==
As of 2023, the coalition's members are the Alternative Ecologists, the Initiative for an Anticapitalist Revolutionary ANTARSYA, the Communist Liberation, the Organization of Communist Internationalists of Greece–Spartacus, the Revolutionary Communist Movement of Greece (EKKE), the Socialist Workers' Party, and the Youth of Communist Liberation.

== Ideology and political platform ==
ANTARSYA (Greek: Αντικαπιταλιστική Αριστερή Συνεργασία για την Ανατροπή) outlines its programmatic priorities around anti-capitalism, workers rights, and social transformation. Its positions are expressed in party congress decisions and official declarations.

=== Economy, debt and the EU ===
ANTARSYA advocates for the unilateral cancellation of Greece’s public debt, which it considers illegitimate and unsustainable. It calls for Greece to exit the eurozone and the European Union, arguing that membership prevents any meaningful anti-austerity or anti-capitalist policy. The party also supports nationalisation of banks and major industries under workers’ and popular control, without compensation where mismanagement or layoffs have occurred.

=== Labour and workers’ rights ===
The coalition prioritises rebuilding class-based labour and social movements, restoring collective bargaining rights, wages and pensions reduced under austerity, and defending trade union freedoms. It calls for workers’ control in production, including cooperatives and occupations in sectors facing closure or redundancies.

=== Democracy and sovereignty ===
ANTARSYA rejects external supervision by the EU, European Central Bank, or International Monetary Fund, and promotes popular sovereignty free from international lenders. It supports radical democratic reforms, expansion of participatory mechanisms, and defends civil liberties against authoritarian legislation.

=== Environment and ecology ===
The party places strong emphasis on ecological struggles, linking them to anti-capitalism. It opposes extractivist projects such as large-scale gold mining in northern Greece, calls for the abandonment of fossil fuels, and supports investment in renewable energy under social and community control.

=== Migration, anti-racism and rights ===
ANTARSYA supports the rights of migrants and refugees, safe and legal routes, and full social and political rights for all residents. It campaigns against racism, xenophobia and far-right violence, and defends gender equality and LGBTQ rights.

Τhe formation of ANTARSYA is understood to have been in explicit opposition to what the radical left in Greece assessed as the "social reformism" of Syriza and its leadership, which ultimately stood in support of austerity policies.

The coalition also supports a comprehensive banning of layoffs; a minimum salary, currently determined to the amount of 1,400 euros per month; a reduction of working time to 35 hours per week, without reduction in wages; complete disarmament of the Hellenic Police; the granting of full political and social rights to all immigrants; and an eco-socialist response to the ecological crisis.

The coalition describes itself as a "front of the anticapitalist, revolutionary, communist left, and of radical ecology" in Greece. Its major positions are:

- Exit from the European Union and the Eurozone, with re-adoption of a national currency,
- Default on Greece's debt, and
- Nationalization without compensation of all major industries in the country.

== Election results ==
ANTARSYA's participation in the electoral, parliamentary process commenced with the European Parliament elections in June 2009, where the coalition took in 21,951 votes or 0.43% of the total. It participated in the October 4, 2009 general elections, listing candidates in every constituency and obtaining 24,737 votes, or 0.36% of the total.

In the September 2015 Greek parliamentary election, it formed an alliance with the Workers Revolutionary Party.

=== Hellenic Parliament ===
Election	Hellenic Parliament					Rank	Leader
Election	Votes	%	±pp	Seats won	+/−	Rank	Leader
2009	24,687	0.36%	New	0 / 300	New	8th	Collective leadership
May 2012	75,416	1.19%	▲0.83	0 / 300	0	13th	Collective leadership
Jun 2012	20,416	0.33%	▼0.86	0 / 300	0	12th	Collective leadership
Jan 2015 (Note: Ran in electoral alliance with the Left Front Coalition)	39,497	0.64%	▲0.31	0 / 300	0	12th	Collective leadership
Sep 2015 (Note: Ran in electoral alliance with EEK.)	46,183	0.85%	▲0.21	0 / 300	0	10th	Collective leadership
2019	23,239	0.41%	▼0.44	0 / 300	0	12th	Collective leadership
May 2023	31,746	0.54%	▲0.10	0 / 300	0	14th	Collective leadership
Jun 2023	15,969	0.31%	▼0.23	0 / 300	0	14th	Collective leadership

=== European Parliament ===
European Parliament
Election	Votes	%	±pp	Seats won	+/−	Rank	Leader	EP Group
2009	21,951	0.43%	New	0 / 22	New	13th	Collective leadership	−
2014	41,307	0.72%	▲0.29	0 / 21	0	18th	Collective leadership	−
2019	36,361	0.64%	▼0.08	0 / 21	0	20th	Collective leadership	−
2024	20,603	0.52%	▼0.12	0 / 21	0	18th	Collective leadership	−

=== Regional elections ===
Regions of Greece
Election year	# of overall votes	% of overall vote	# of overall seats won	±
2010	97,499	1.79	7 / 725	
2014	128,154	2.27	9 / 703	▲2
2019	87,676	1.62	13 / 703	▲4

== See also ==
- Politics of Greece
- List of political parties in Greece
