= Alaca Imaret Mosque =

Former mosque in Thessalonike, Greece

- Αλατζά Ιμαρέτ
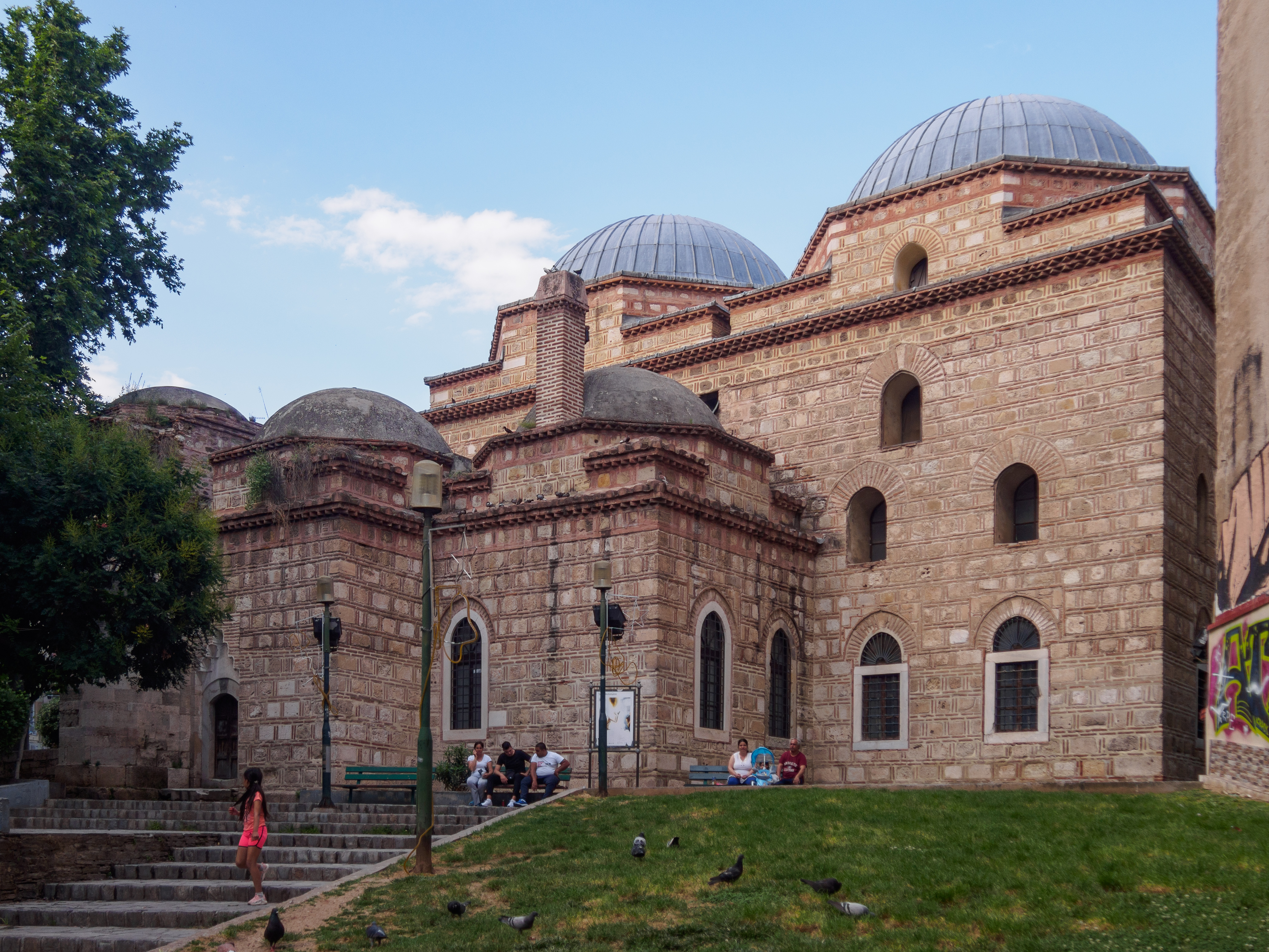
- The former mosque after restoration

- Location of the mosque in Greece

Religion
- Affiliation: Islam (former)
- Ecclesiastical or organizational status: Mosque
- Status: Inactive

Location
- Location: Thessaloniki, Macedonia
- Country: Greece
- Interactive map of Alaca Imaret Mosque
- Coordinates: 40°38′21″N 22°56′59″E

Architecture
- Type: Mosque
- Style: Islamic; Ottoman
- Founder: Ishak Pasha
- Completed: 1484 or 1487

Specifications
- Dome: 2
- Minaret: 1 (since destroyed)
- Materials: Stone; brick

The Alaca Imaret Mosque (Greek: Αλατζά Ιμαρέτ, from Turkish: Alaca İmaret Camii, lit. 'Colourful Mosque'), also known as the Ishak Pasha Mosque, is a mosque in Thessaloniki, Greece. Completed in the 1480s, during the Ottoman era, the mosque was built under the direction of Ishak Pasha.

== Architecture ==
It was built by order of Ishak Pasha in 1484 or 1487. It consists of a mosque with an imaret (public charity kitchen). The mosque and imaret are not in use anymore.

The mosque has a reverse T plan common to early Ottoman architecture, the prayer hall is covered by two large domes, it has a portico covered by five smaller domes. It had one minaret, that was destroyed after 1912, after Thessaloniki was conquered by the Greek Army and became part of the modern Greek state.

The mosque is under restoration.

== See also ==
- Islam in Greece
- List of former mosques in Greece
- Ottoman Greece
