= Revolutionary Communist Movement of Greece =

Revolutionary Communist Movement of Greece Επαναστατικό Κομμουνιστικό Κίνημα Ελλάδας
- Founded: 1970
- Headquarters: Athens
- Newspaper: Kokkino Deltio
- Ideology: Communism; Marxism-Leninism; Maoism; Anti-revisionism
- Political position: Far-left
- National affiliation: Anticapitalist Left Cooperation for the Overthrow
- Colours: Red

Party flag
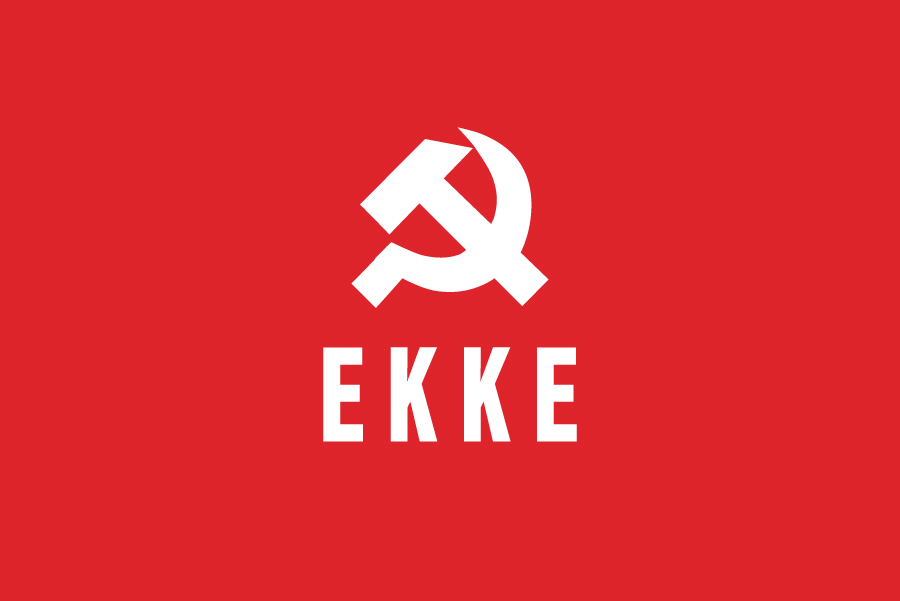

Website
- ekke.net.gr

The Revolutionary Communist Movement of Greece or EKKE (Greek: Επαναστατικό Κομμουνιστικό Κίνημα Ελλάδας, ΕΚΚΕ) is a Greek Marxist–Leninist organisation.

== History ==
It was founded in 1970 mainly by students, who considered conservative and timid the political positions and practice of existing Marxist-Leninist Greek organisations (OMLE etc.), projecting as their immediate strategic goal "laocracy", with socialist characteristics.

Through the formation and activity of the "Anti-Fascist Anti-Imperialist Student Party Greece" (AASPE), EKKE gained access to the student movement and contributed to the development of the anti-dictatorship student movement and the revolt of the Polytechnic. Members of the EKKE were arrested in early 1974, tortured and imprisoned. After the fall of the dictatorship, they became active in the student sector, supported the factory trade union movement, while significant activity in the support for strikers, in districts facing emergency problems, etc.

EKKE participated in the first post-dictatorial elections, collecting 0.03% of the vote. In the following ones in 1977 it took about 0.1%.

RCP adopted the Chinese Maoist "three worlds theory", according to which the number one danger was the USSR. The RCP called for a front against the two superpowers, giving the Communist Party of Greece the role of the Soviet enemy. This policy, its support for the new China's new leadership after Mao's death, and the persecution of his collaborators in the Cultural Revolution, the insistence on projecting the danger of the outbreak of a Greek–Turkish war, and even, and fatigue from intensive activism, created problems in its ranks. Two successive departures of members, in 1979 and 1980, destroyed its potential.

== Alliances ==
In 1999, EKKE joined the Radical Left Front (MERA) political coalition and in 2009 Anticapitalist Left Cooperation for the Overthrow.

== See also ==
- Anticapitalist Left Cooperation for the Overthrow
- Radical Left Front
- List of anti-revisionist groups
