= Kostas Peletidis =

Greek politician

- Κώστας Πελετίδης
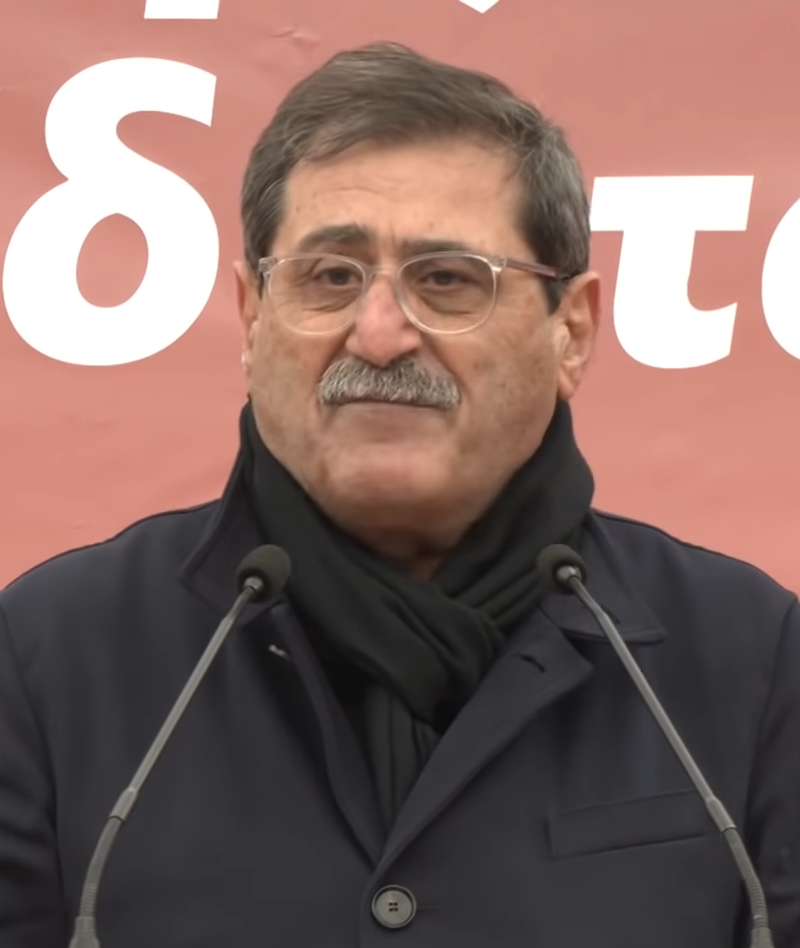

Mayor of Patras
- Incumbent
- Assumed office 1 September 2014

Personal details
- Born: Ryaki, Greece
- Party: Communist Party of Greece

Konstantinos Peletidis (Greek: Κωνσταντίνος Πελετίδης; born 1953) is a Greek cardiologist and Marxist-Leninist politician. A member of the Communist Party of Greece, he has served as Mayor of Patras since 1 September 2014. He was born in the village of Ryaki in Northern Greece and studied medicine in Italy. Afterwards, he worked as a cardiologist in Edessa before later settling in Patras with his wife and daughter.

Peletidis is notable for his denial of municipal campaign space to the Neo-Nazi party Golden Dawn. In 2015, then-MP candidate Michalis Arvanitis brought charges of dereliction of duty against Peletidis for this, but in 2017 a local misdemeanors court cleared the charges.
