= United Independent Left Movement =

in Greece, the United Independent Left Movement (Greek: Ενιαία Ανεξάρτητη Αριστερή Κίνηση (ΕΑΑΚ); EAAK) is a sum of left-wing student organisations, active in 3rd-level educational institutions (universities and technological educational institutes).

== History ==
The EAAK was founded in 1990–91. In 2016, EAAK collaborated with the left-wing student organisations AREN and ARDIN.

Currently, more than 10 radical left organisations participate in EAAK.

== Politics ==
One of the main disagreements with other left groups is their support of uniform academic degrees. They disagree with knowledge specialisation and the split of university study objects. They also oppose to any commercial involvement of corporations within studies and academic research.
