= Municipal Art Gallery (Thessaloniki) =

Gallery in Thessaloniki, Greece

Coordinates: 40.5990°N 22.9544°E

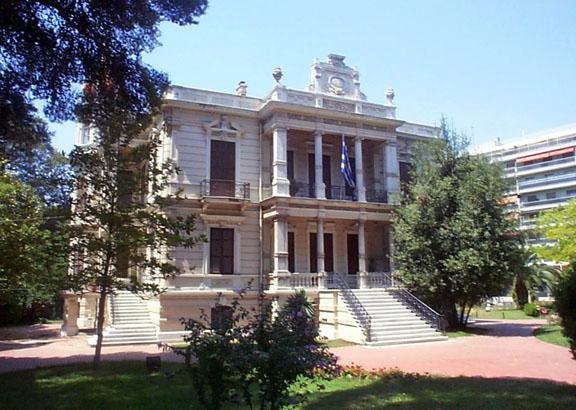
Villa Mordoch

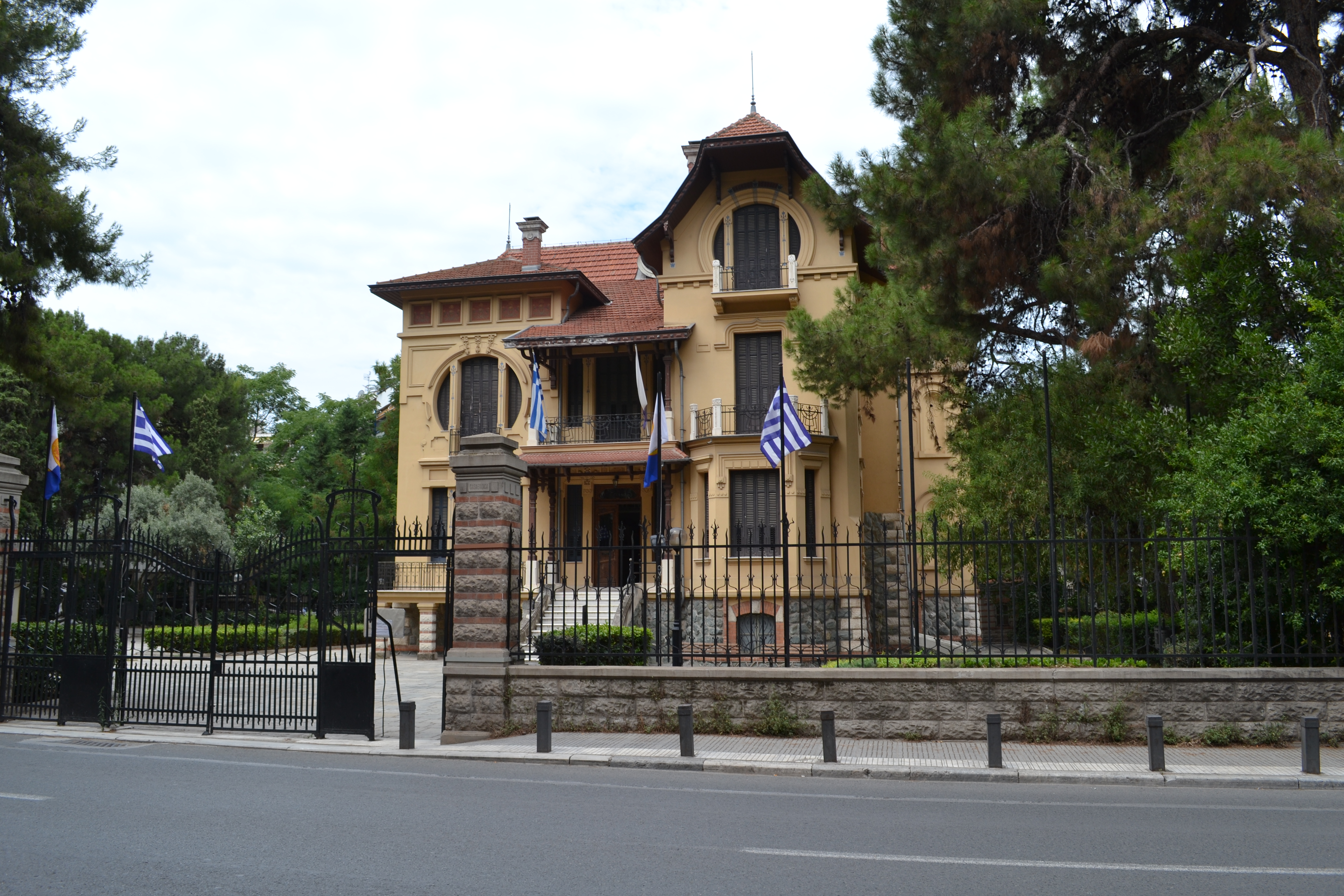
Villa Bianca

The Municipal Art Gallery of the Municipality of Thessaloniki in Central Macedonia, Greece was founded in 1966 as an offshoot of the Municipal Library. Since 1986 it has been housed in the Villa Mordoch on Vassilissis Olgas Avenue, a mansion designed by the architect Xenophon Paionidis in the eclectic style in 1905 and owned by the Municipality of Thessaloniki. Since 2013 it is housed in Villa Bianca, also on Vassilissis Olgas Avenue. It also uses the Makridis Room near the Posidonio sports centre on the sea front and the old Archaeological Museum (Yeni Cami) as permanent exhibition spaces.

The gallery has more than 1,000 works in its collection, and these are divided into the Thessalonian Artists Collection (3 generations: 1898–1922, 1923–40, 1941–67), the Modern Greek Engraving Collection, the Collection of Byzantine and Postbyzantine Icons, which covers a period of six centuries, the Modern Greek Art Collection, and the Sculpture Collection.

The gallery organises regular (mainly retrospective) exhibitions of Greek artists, produces numerous publications, has a specialised library-cum-reading-room, and offers guided tours for the public (booked in advance). Since 1986 it has held 55 exhibitions of Greek and foreign artists. One of its aims is to jointly organise exhibitions with major visual arts institutions in Greece and abroad. Thus it has presented such artists as Max Ernst and Nikos Engonopoulos (in 1997), Theofilos Hatzimichail (in 1998), and, for the first time in Greece, the works of Nikolaos Gyzis owned by his family (in late 1999). The latter include drawings and oil paintings from Gyzis’s travels in Greece, Asia Minor, and Germany, family portraits and scenes, allegorical subjects, genre paintings, and still lives.

The immediate aims of the Municipal Gallery include converting the second and third floors of the Villa Bianca into permanent exhibition spaces for works by Thessalonian artists and its collection of Byzantine icons.

== Gallery ==
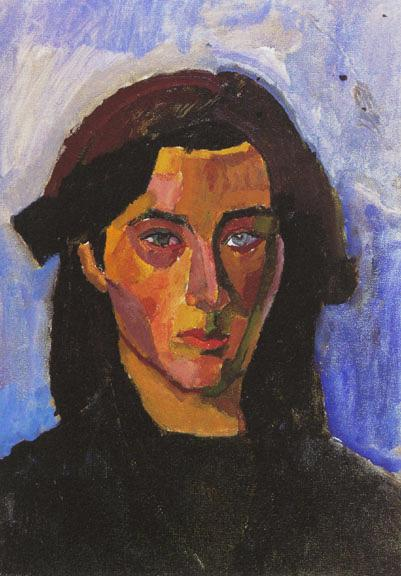
Anastasiadis

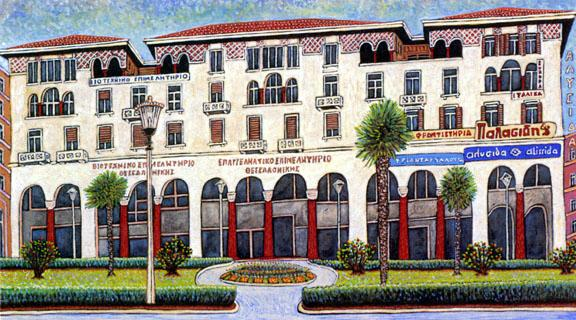
Papaspirou

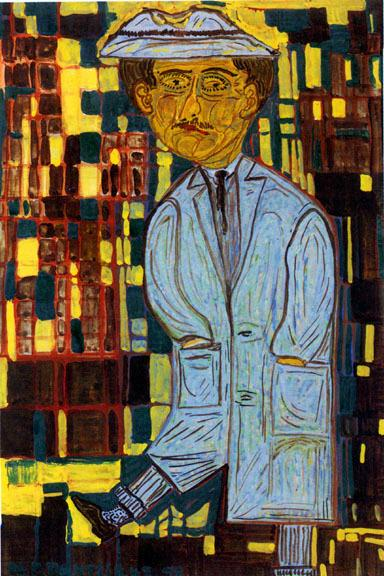
Pentzikis

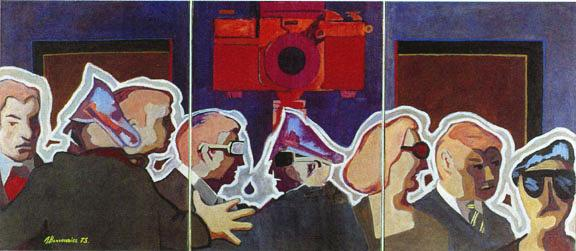
Venetoulias

== Sources ==
- This article incorporates text from the corresponding article at the Museums of Macedonia website, commissioned by the Macedonian Heritage foundation, written by Vlasis Vlasidis, and published under a CC-BY-SA-3.0 license.
- L. Tsaktsiras; K. Papanthimou; G. Mantzios; N. Kalogirou, eds. (2004), Thessaloniki. The city and its monuments, Thessaloniki, pp. 171–174, ISBN 960-239-759-4
