= Baptistery of St. John the Baptist (Thessaloniki) =

Byzantine era Greek Orthodox church in Thessaloniki, Greece

- Βαπτιστήριο Αγίου Ιωάννη του Προδρόμου
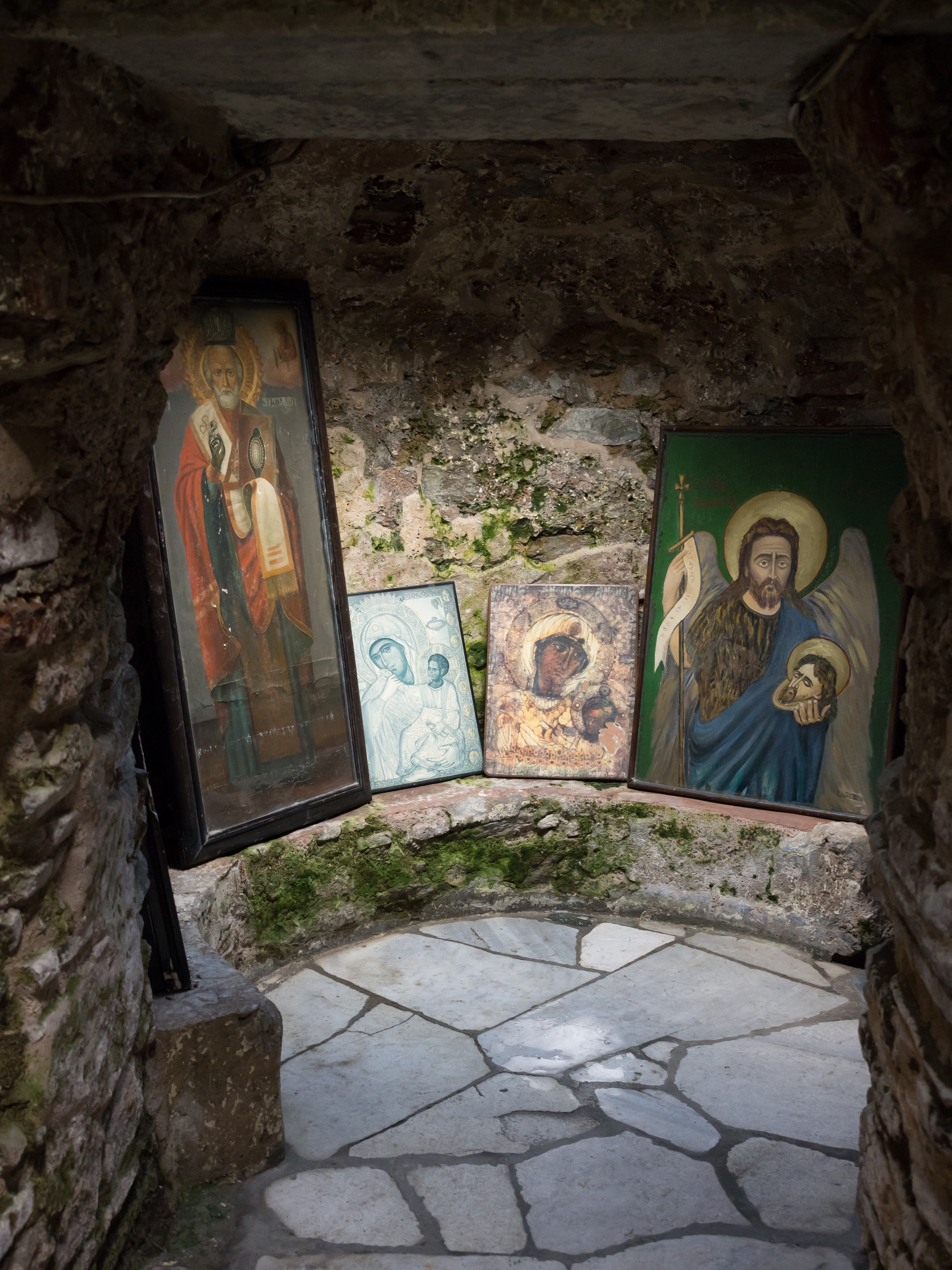
- Icons of Saint Nicolaus, the Theothokos and Saint John the Baptist in the catacombs

- Location of the baptistery in Greece
- Baptistery of St. John the Baptist
- 40°37′57″N 22°56′49″E
- Location: Thessaloniki, Central Macedonia
- Country: Greece
- Denomination: Greek Orthodox

History
- Status: Baptistery
- Dedication: Saint John the Baptist
- Events: January 7

Architecture
- Functional status: Active (weddings and baptisms); In partial ruins (tourism site)
- Architectural type: Basilica
- Style: Byzantine
- Completed: c. 5th century

Administration
- Province: Ecumenical Patriarchate of Constantinople
- Metropolis: Thessaloniki

The Baptistery of St. John the Baptist Greek: Βαπτιστήριο Αγίου Ιωάννη του Προδρόμου) is a Greek Orthodox baptistery located in Thessaloniki, in Central Macedonia, Greece. It is considered to be the oldest early-Christian baptistery and is situated within a five-aisled episcopal basilica that was completed in the fifth century, during the Byzantine era.

The baptistery was identified at the excavations of the Byzantine church of Hagia Sophia. It consists of a room with platforms and includes a baptismal font. It was in direct contact with the royal in the 5th century from the hallway with a mosaic floor. The baptistery is located within the Galerian Palace complex.

== Overview ==
Located south of the Hagia Sophia, the site comprises Roman-era gardens, ruins of the nymphaeum, a spring and thermal baths dedicated to the nymphs, and catacombs. During the Byzantine-era, the nymphaeum was converted into a holy water spring for the purposes of baptism and the catacombs were developed as an underground worship place in honor of St. John the Baptist. There are also remnants of an early Christian church. Most of the garden structure is in ruins. However, the catacombs retain their original structure and provide facilities for weddings and baptisms.

Modern facilities support tourism activity and include a cafe and an adjacent apartment complex.

== See also ==
- Church of Greece
- List of Eastern Orthodox church buildings in Greece
