= Longos Mansion =

Building in Thessaloniki, Greece

Coordinates: 40.6329°N 22.9458°E

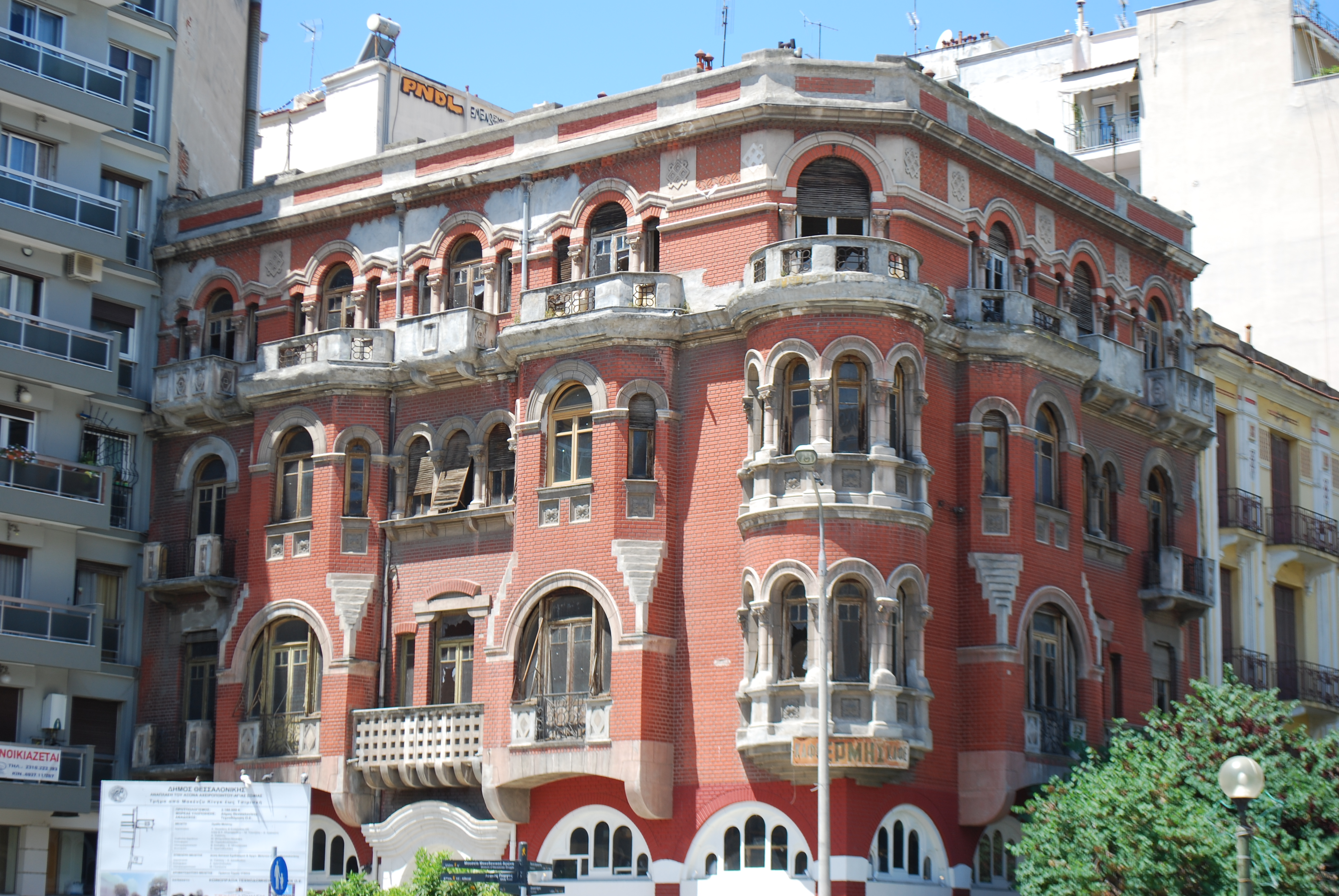
The building

The Longos Mansion (Greek: Μέγαρο Λόγγου), also known as the Red House (Κόκκινο Σπίτι) due to its red brick exterior, is a three-storey house in Agias Sofias Square in the center of Thessaloniki.

== History ==
The mansion was designed in 1926 by architect Leonardo Gennari for the family of Grigorios Longos – a wealthy textile industrialist from Naousa, in the Neobyzantine style. He later gave it to his brother, Ioannis, which is why it is known as "Ioannis Longos mansion". In 1983, it was listed by the Greek Ministry of Culture for preservation.

The company that undertook its construction went bankrupt a few months later and Longos' factory in Naousa was destroyed in a fire accident. As a result, rumours were created about suicides and ghosts in the abandoned mansion.

Until 1992, there was a cafe called "Ermis" on the ground floor, frequently visited by retired teachers and professors. Today, in its place, there is a restaurant called "Kourdisto Gourouni" (meaning Clockwork Pig). In early 2014, Ivan Savvidis – the wealthy businessman and owner of football team PAOK FC, bought the house for four million euros. A store selling official PAOK merchandise operates there now.
