= Villa Bianca (Thessaloniki) =

Building in Thessaloniki, Greece

Coordinates: 40.5965°N 22.9557°E

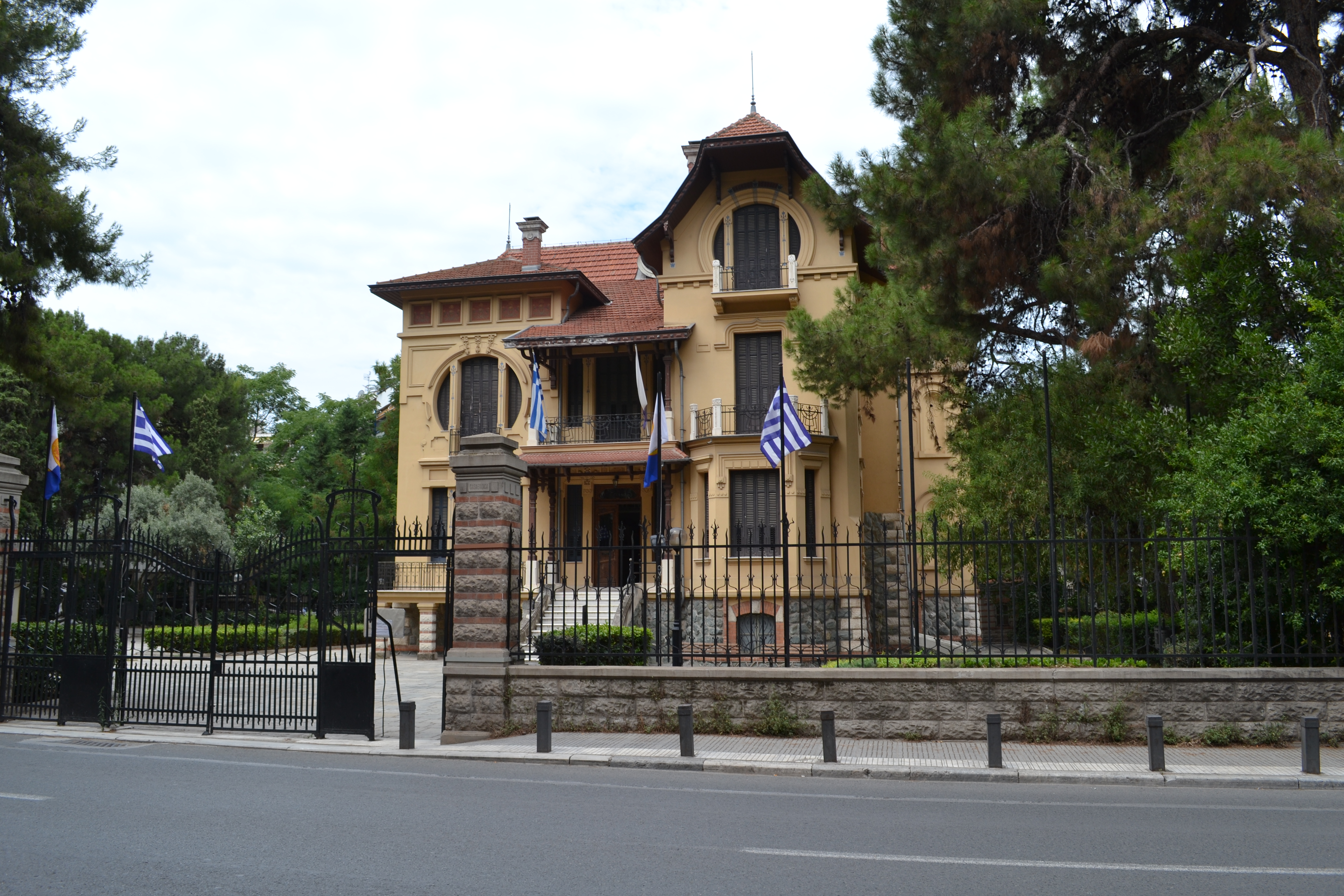
Villa Bianca

Casa Bianca or Villa Fernandez is a famous mansion in the city of Thessaloniki, Greece. It is located in Vassilisis Olgas street and was built between 1911 and 1913 as a residence for Dino Fernandez Diaz and his family. The architect was Pietro Arrigoni (variously also spelled: Piero/Pierro Arigon/Arrigon/Arigoni).

== History ==
Of Sephardi (Spanish) Jewish origin, Fernandez was a wealthy merchant and industrialist of the city.

The building passed to his daughter, where she lived with her Christian husband, and was later confiscated and used by the Germans during the Axis occupation of Greece. To escape from the Nazis, Dino Fernandez Diaz, with other members of his family, fled to Italy, but they were murdered in 1943 by the German SS near Como Lake.

The building has elements of eclecticist architecture, like many other buildings of that period in the city.

Since 2013 it houses the Municipal Art Gallery.

== Sources ==
- Casa Bianca -Η ζωή στη Θεσσαλονίκη γύρω στα 1900/Το αρχοντικό του Dino Fernandez Diaz- Ιστορική σκιαγραφία και μελέτη αναστηλώσεως, του Ν.Κ.Μουτσόπουλου, Θεσσαλονίκη 1998
- Casa Bianca - History of a building on the internet page of the City of Thessaloniki
