= Villa Mordoch =

Building in Thessaloniki, Greece

Coordinates: 40.599038°N 22.954441°E

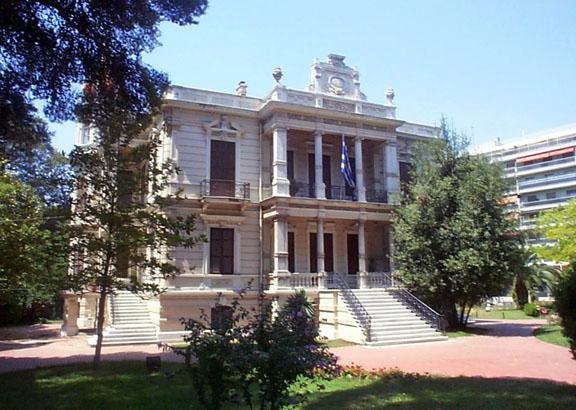
Villa Mordoch

Villa Mordoch (Greek: Βίλα Μορντόχ) is the name of a historic villa of Thessaloniki, Greece on Vasilissis Olgas Avenue.

== History ==
It was the property of the wealthy Salonica Jewish Mordoch family of the city. It was completed in 1905, designed by architect Xenophon Paionidis.

Today it houses public services of the Municipality of Thessaloniki.
