= Agias Sofias Square =

Square in Thessaloniki, Greece

Coordinates: 40.6333°N 22.9459°E

Agias Sofias Square (Greek: Πλατεία Αγίας Σοφίας) is a square in the city of Thessaloniki in Greece.

== History ==
The square dates back to the Byzantine period of the city and took its name from the church of Hagia Sophia (Holy Wisdom) located within it. At the time it was also called Skalia. During a fire in 1890, it was heavily damaged but was restored under the supervision of Charles Diehl, a notable Byzantinist.

Although not a square today, plans have been released which include the complete redevelopment of the area with a new square and pedestrianized zone to extent from the Church of the Acheiropoietos to the sea.

== Gallery ==
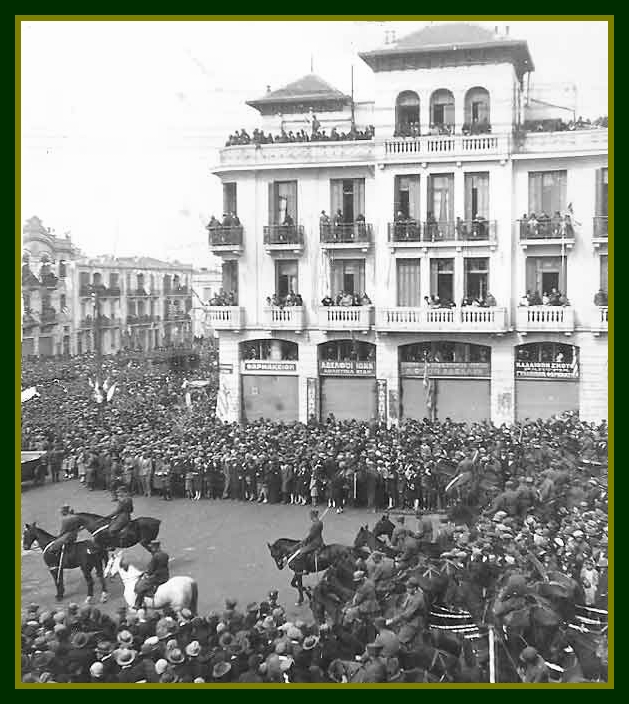
Celebrations in the square in the 20s

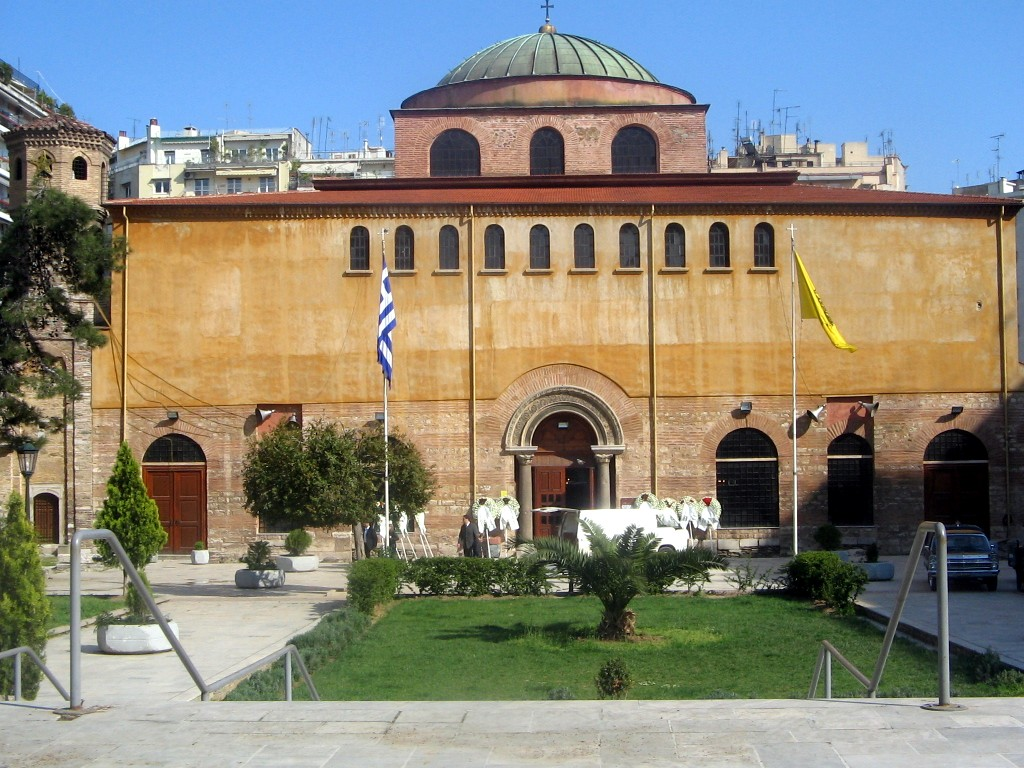
Hagia Sophia church

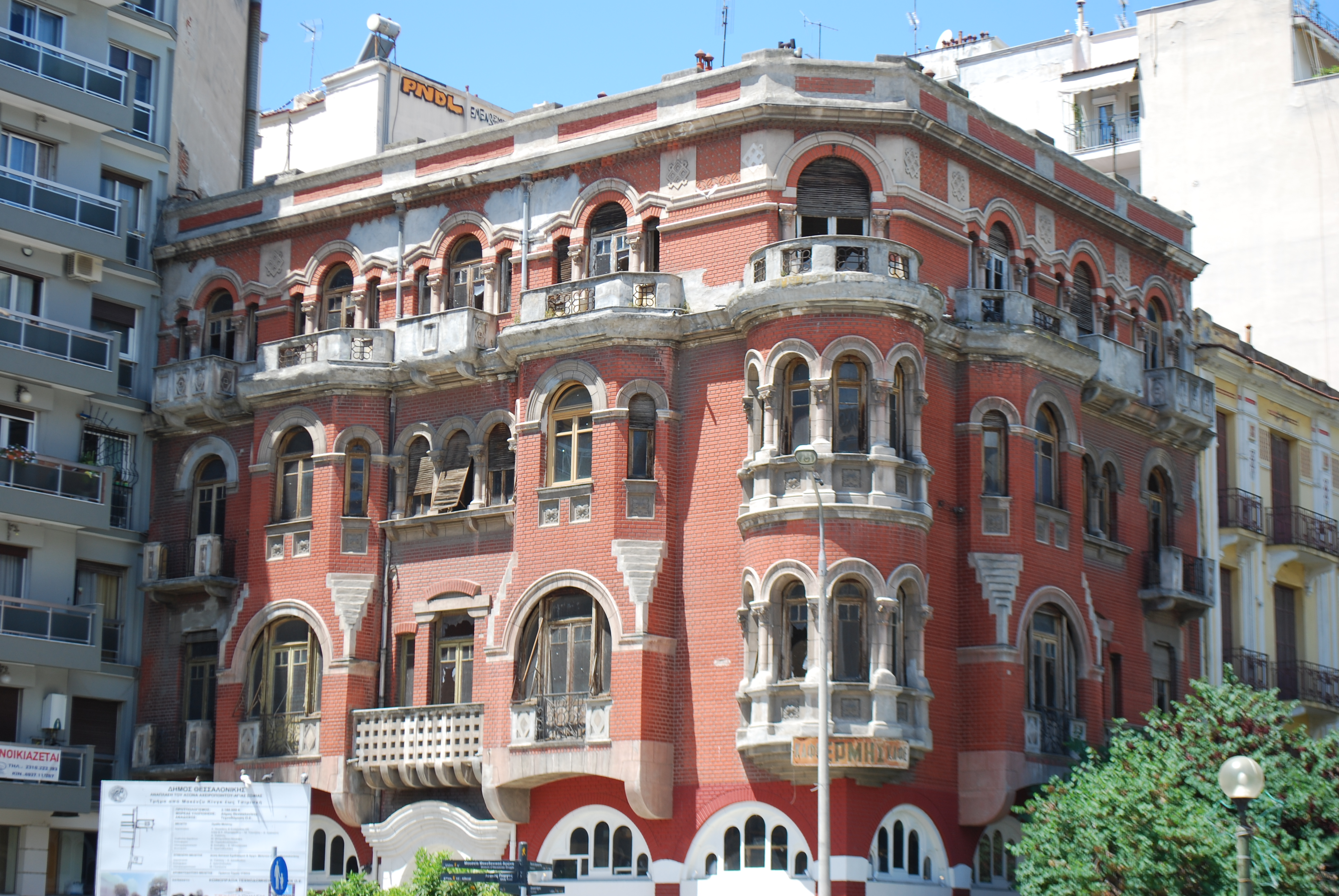
Longos mansion (arch. Leonardo Gennari)

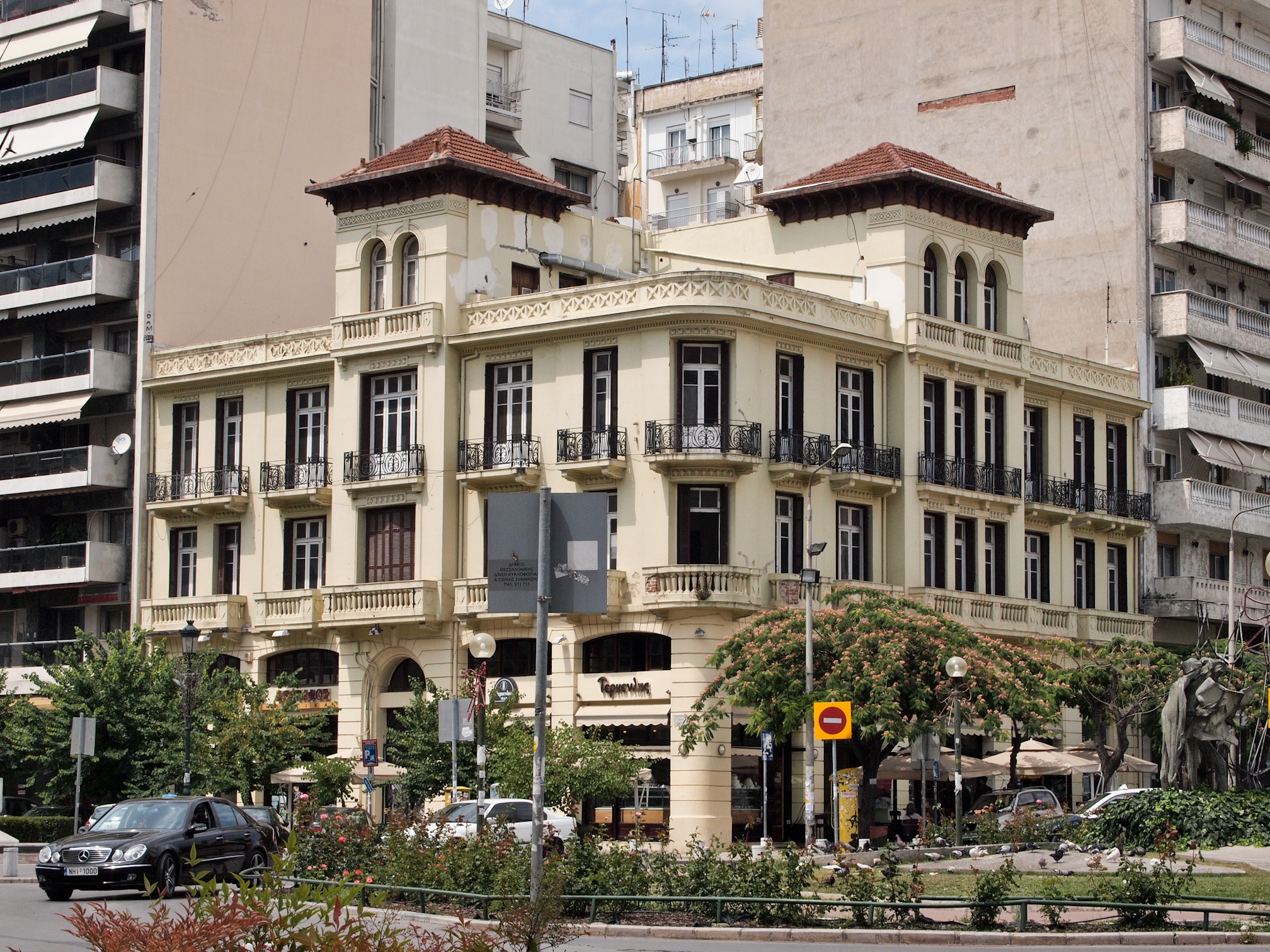
Israel building (arch. Joseph Pleyber)

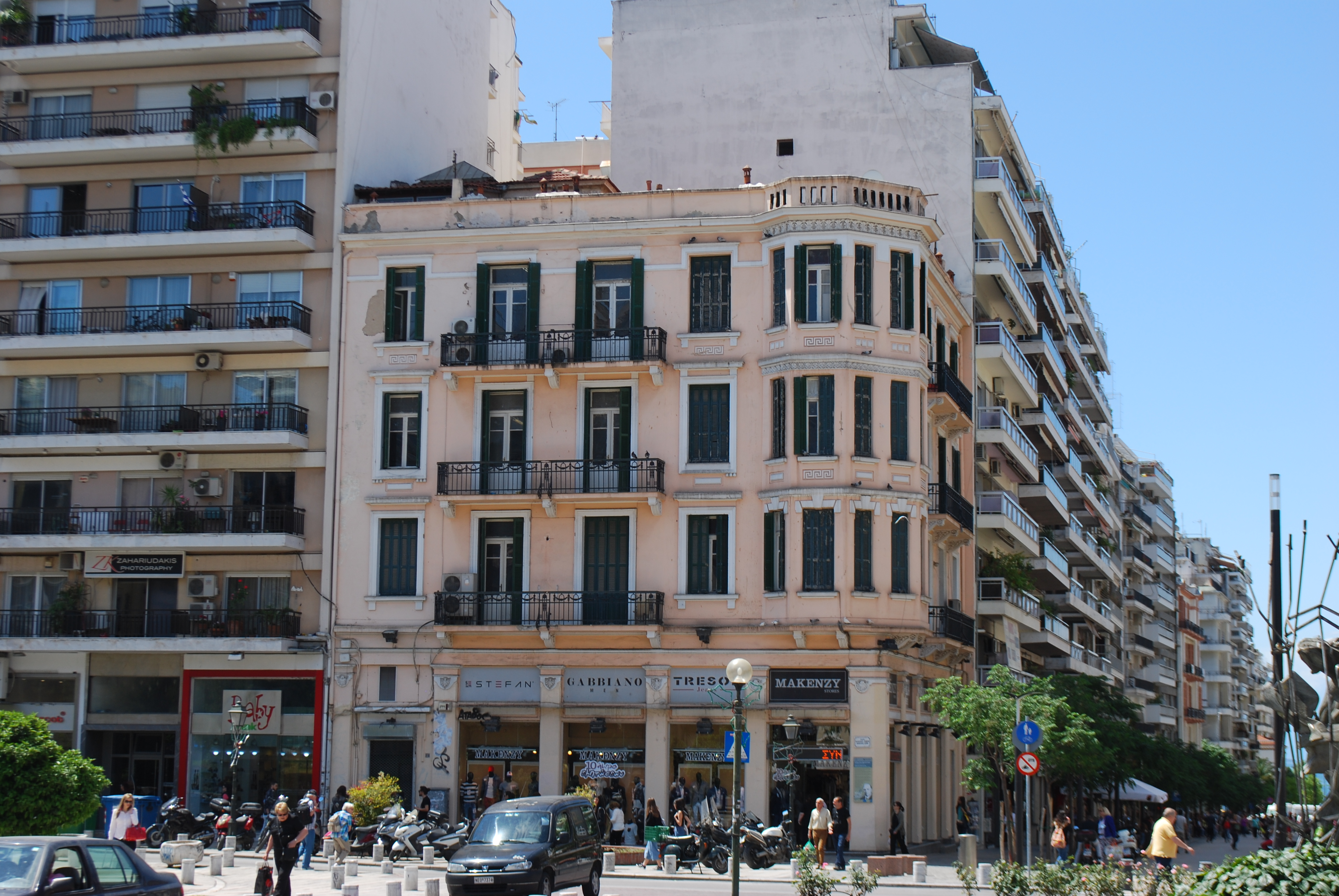
Nedelkos building (arch. Xenophon Paionidis), Mackenzie King Street

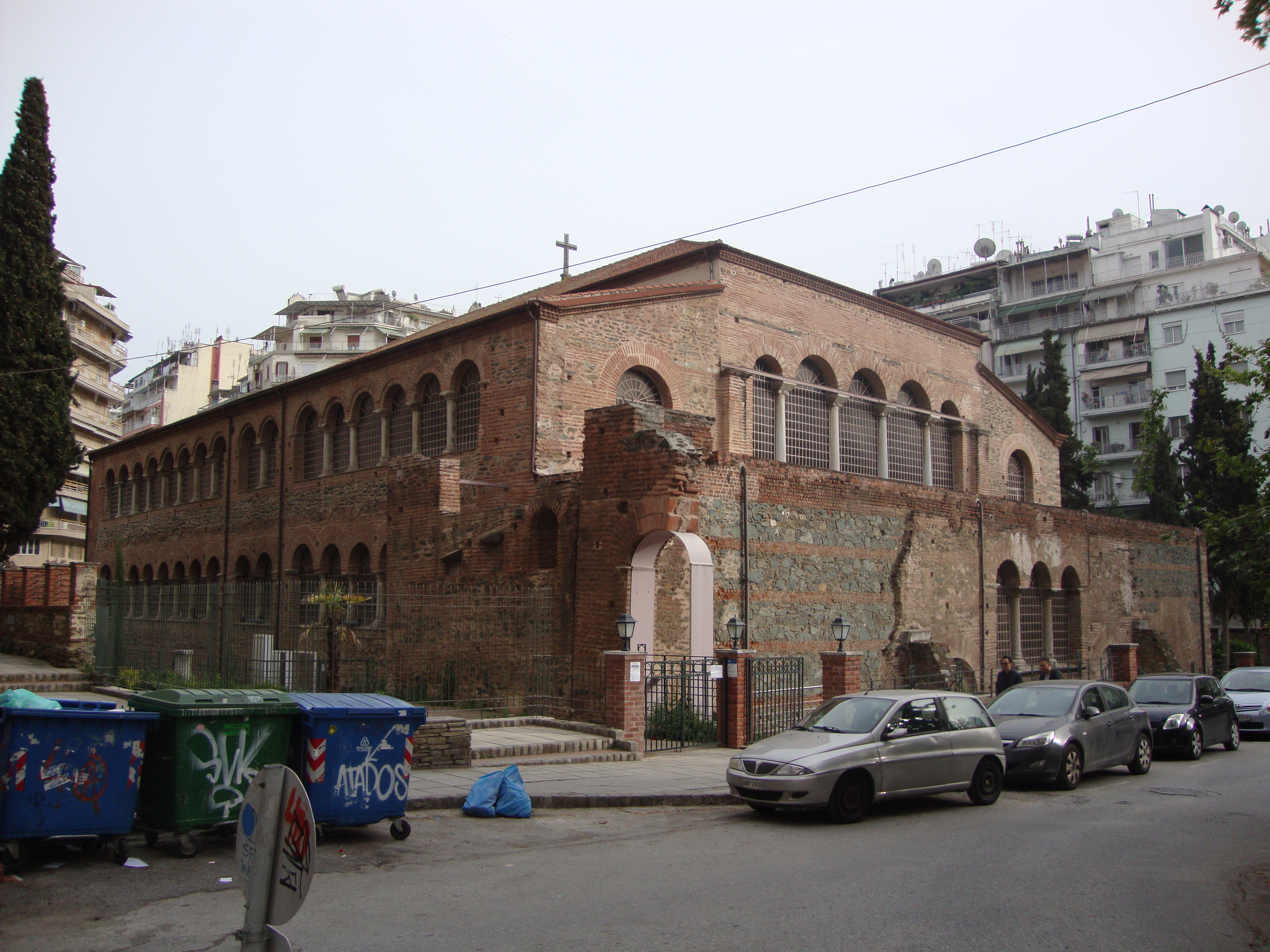
Church of the Acheiropoietos

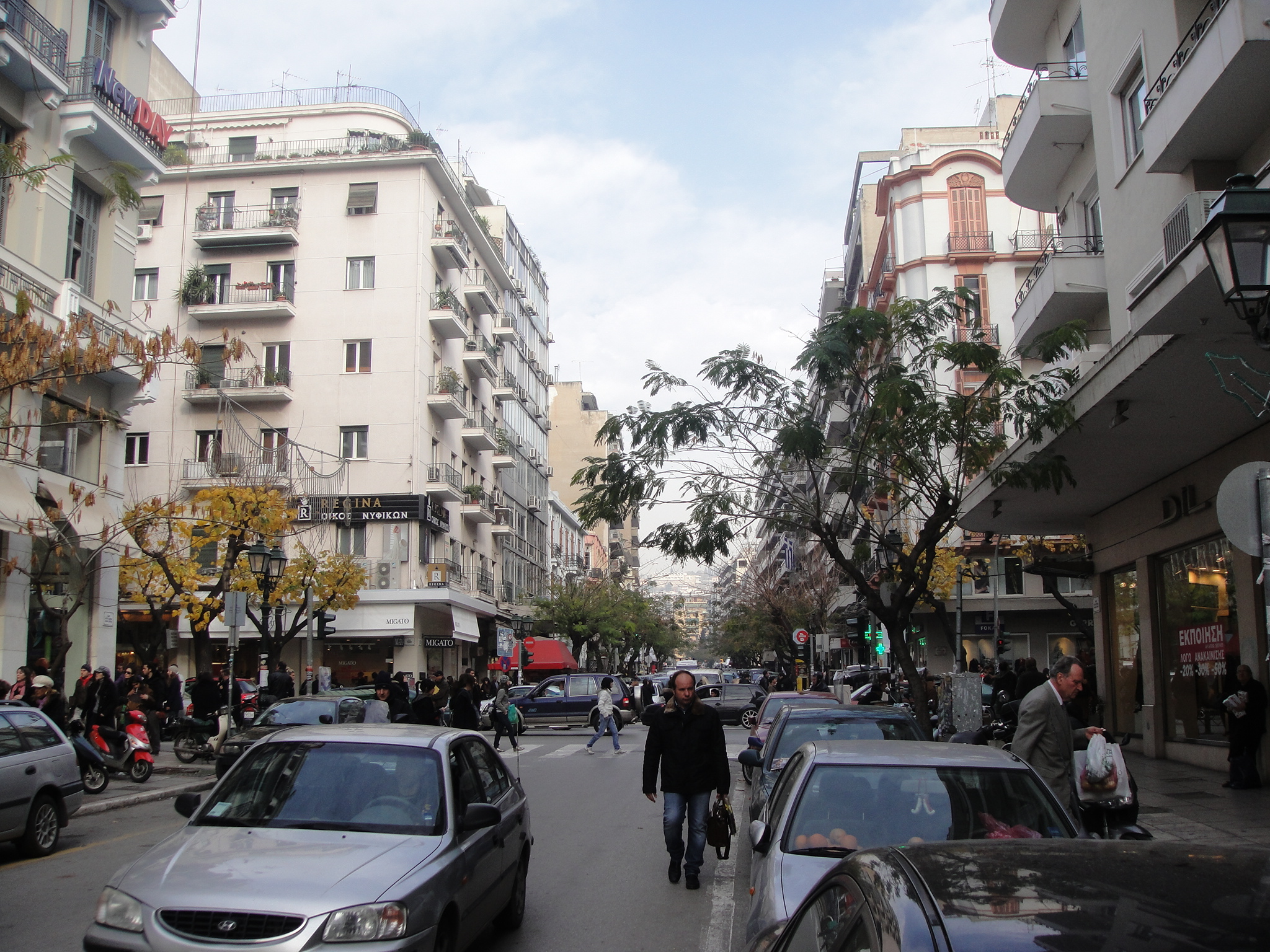
Agias Sofias Street

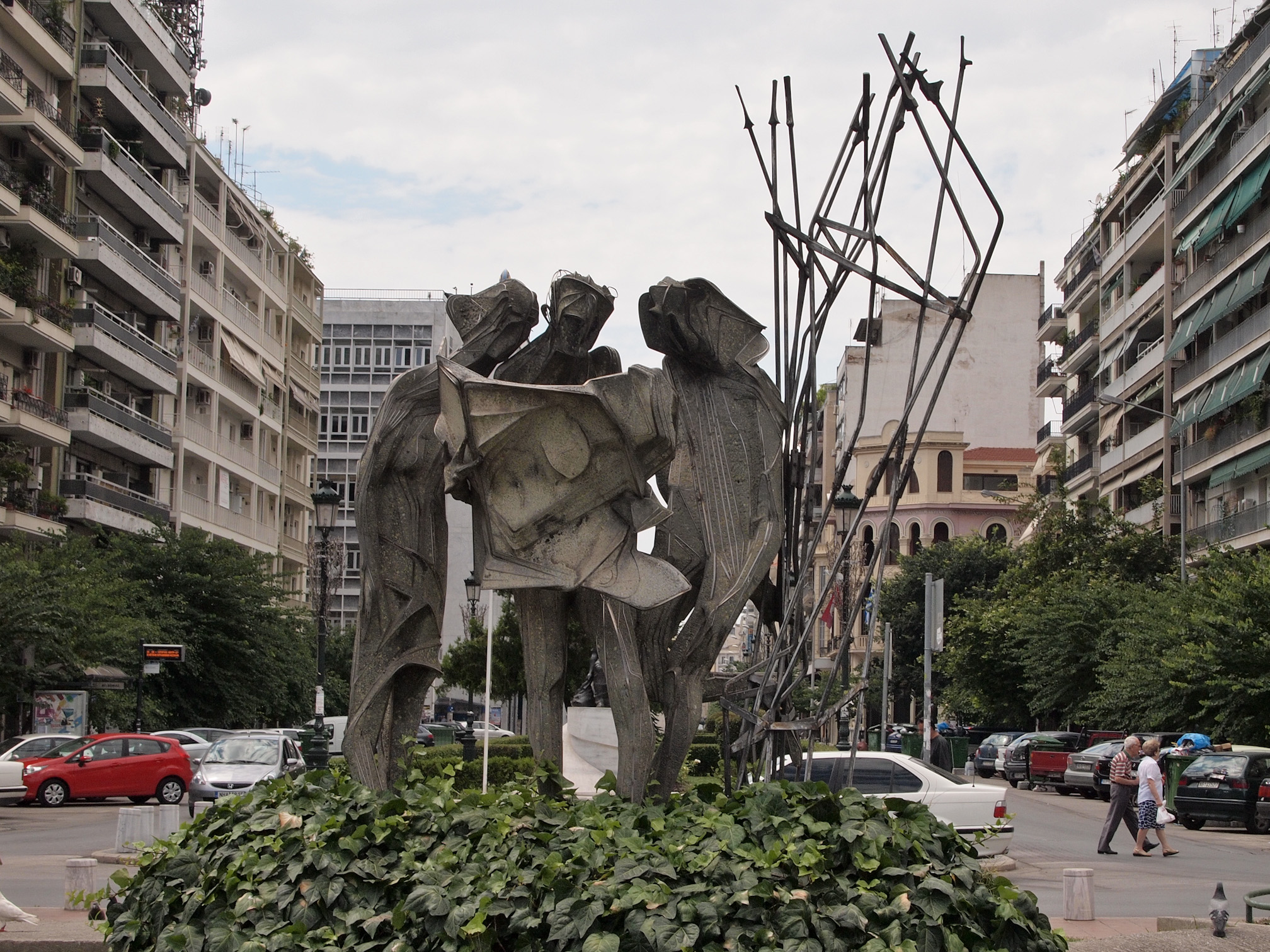
Sculpture in the square

== Sources ==
- Agias Sofias Square
