= Hagia Sophia, Thessaloniki =

UNESCO World Heritage Site in Greece

Church of Holy Wisdom
UNESCO World Heritage Site
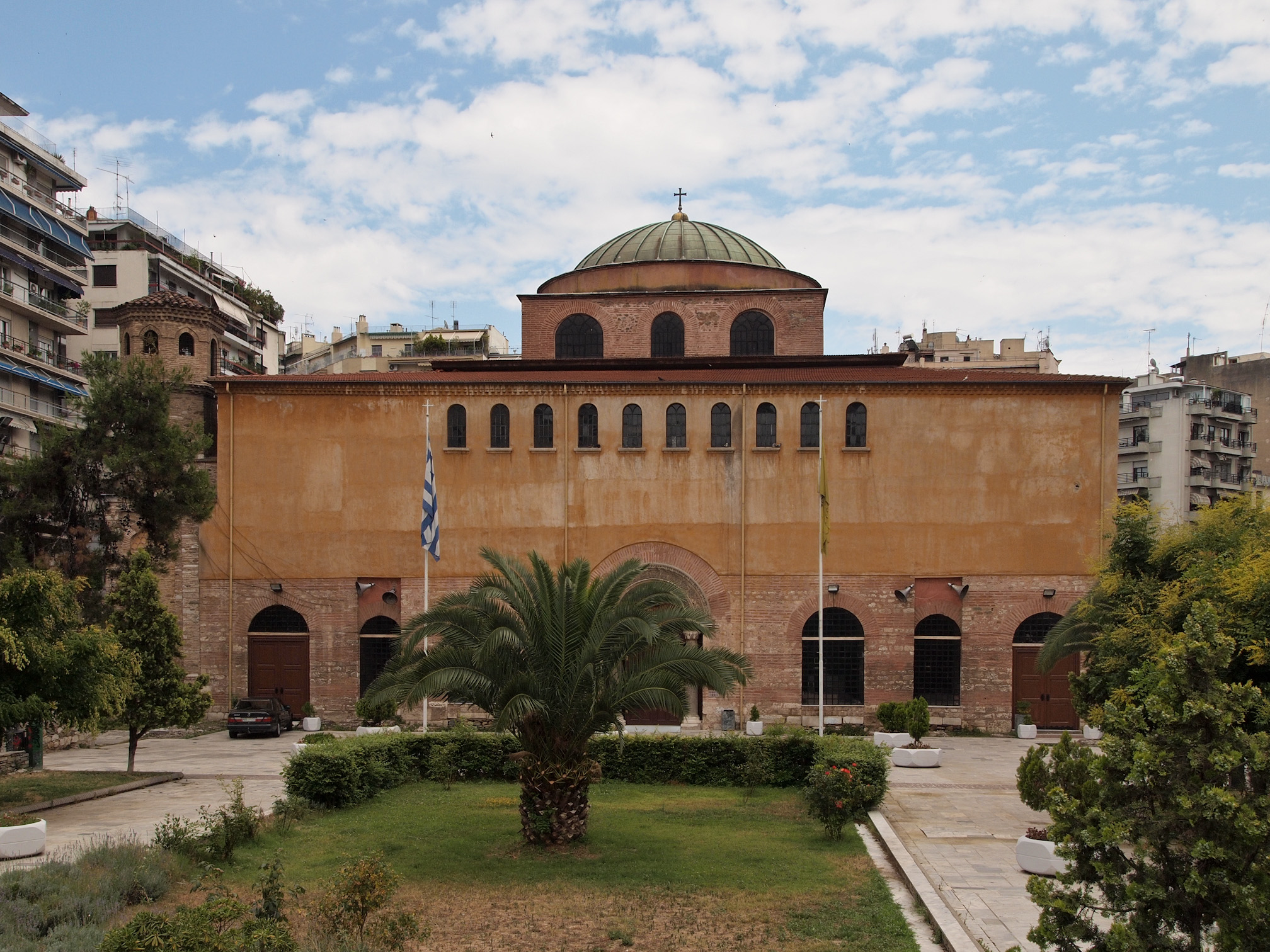
- The Hagia Sophia

- Location within Greece
- Location: Thessaloniki, Greece
- Part of: Paleochristian and Byzantine monuments of Thessaloniki
- Criteria: Cultural: (i), (ii), (iv)
- Reference: 456-006
- Inscription: 1988 (12th Session)
- Area: 0.82 ha (2.0 acres)
- Coordinates: 40°37′58″N 22°56′49″E

The Hagia Sophia (Greek: Ἁγία Σοφία, Holy Wisdom) is a church located in Thessaloniki, Greece. With its current structure dating from the 7th century, it is one of the oldest churches in the city still standing today. Because of its outstanding Byzantine art and architecture, in addition to its importance in early Christianity, it is one of several monuments in Thessaloniki listed as a UNESCO World Heritage Site in 1988.

== History ==
Since the 3rd century there has been a church in the location of the current Hagia Sophia. In 620, that church collapsed, most likely because of an earthquake. Later in the 7th century, the present structure was erected, based on the Hagia Sophia in Constantinople (present-day Istanbul, Turkey). In 1205, when the Fourth Crusade captured the city, the Hagia Sophia was converted into the cathedral of Thessaloniki, which lasted until 1224, the year when the battalions of the Despotate of Epirus, under Theodore Komnenos Doukas, liberated the city. After the capture of Thessaloniki by the Ottoman Sultan Murad II on 29 March 1430, the church was converted into a mosque, called Ayasofya Camii, keeping its old name. It was reconverted to a church upon the liberation of Thessaloniki in 1912.

Its ground plan is that of a domed Greek cross basilica. Together with the Gül and the Kalenderhane Mosques in Istanbul and the destroyed Church of the Dormition in Nicaea, it represents one of the main architectural examples of this type, typical of the Byzantine middle period.

In the Iconoclastic era, the apse of the church was embellished with plain gold mosaics with only one great cross, similarly to the Hagia Irene in Constantinople and the Church of the Dormition in Nicaea. The cross was substituted with the image of the Theotokos (God-bearer, or Mary) in 787-797 after the victory of the Iconodules. The mosaic in the dome now represents the Ascension with the inscription from Acts 1:11 "Ye men of Galilee, why stand ye gazing up into heaven?". The dome is ringed by the figures of all Twelve Apostles, Mary and two angels.

The Interior of Hagia Sophia

Between 1907 and 1909 Byzantine historian Charles Diehl restored the whole building, which had experienced significant damage during a fire in 1890. Much of the interior decoration was plastered over after the Great Thessaloniki Fire of 1917. The dome was not restored until 1980.

== Architecture ==
Hagia Sophia is built in the architectural style of a domed basilica. The columns of the central nave are pulled to the sides, so that the central space of the church has the shape of an isosceles cross. It can thus be considered a transitional form between the domed basilica and the inscribed cross, which dominated Byzantine church architecture from the 10th century onwards. Along with the Church of Saint Theodosius, the Monastery of Valens in Constantinople, and the destroyed Church of the Dormition of the Virgin Mary in Nicaea, Hagia Sophia in Thessaloniki represents one of the main architectural examples of this type of architecture, which was quite famous during the Byzantine period.

== Gallery ==
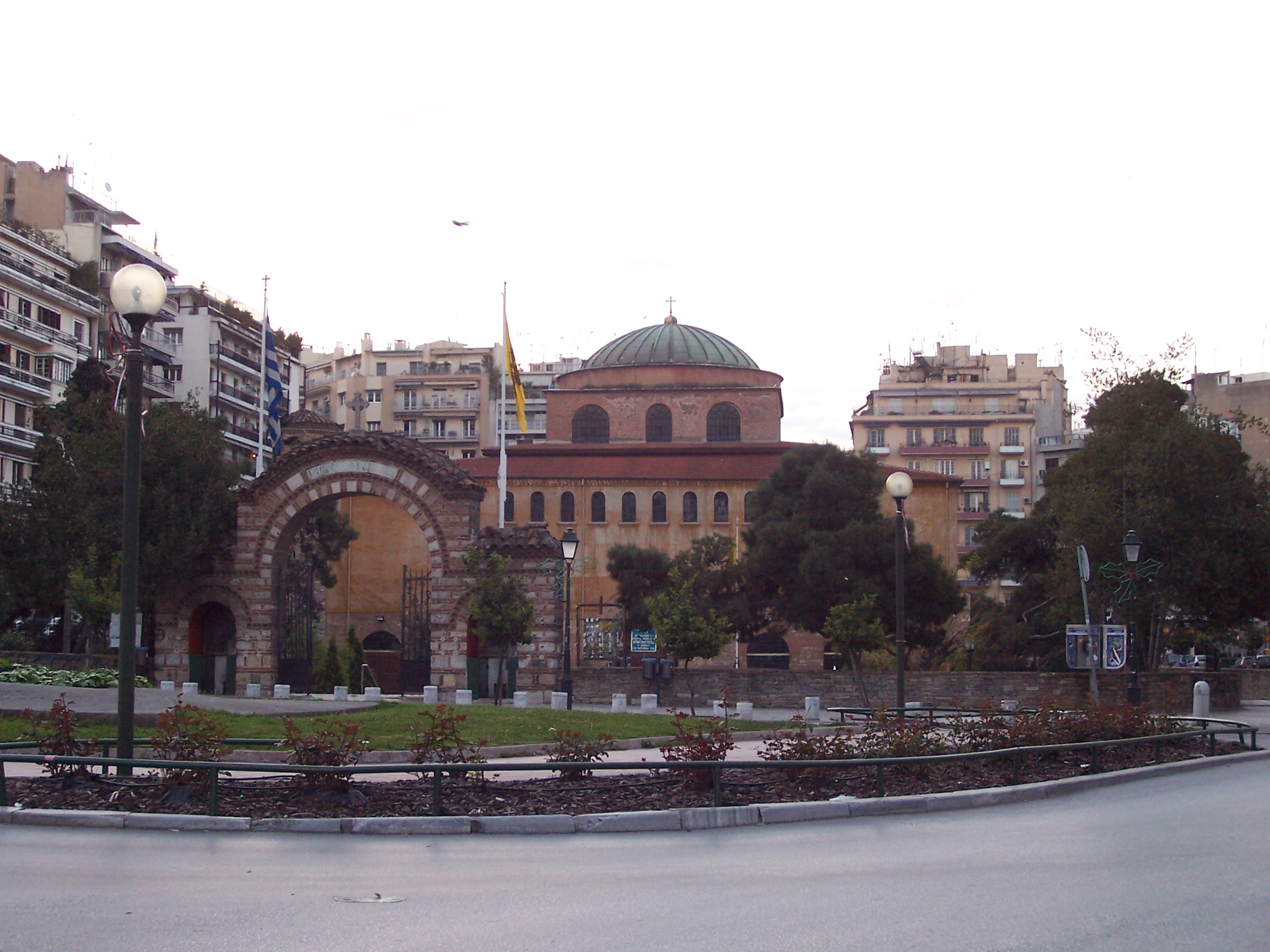
View from Agias Sofias Square

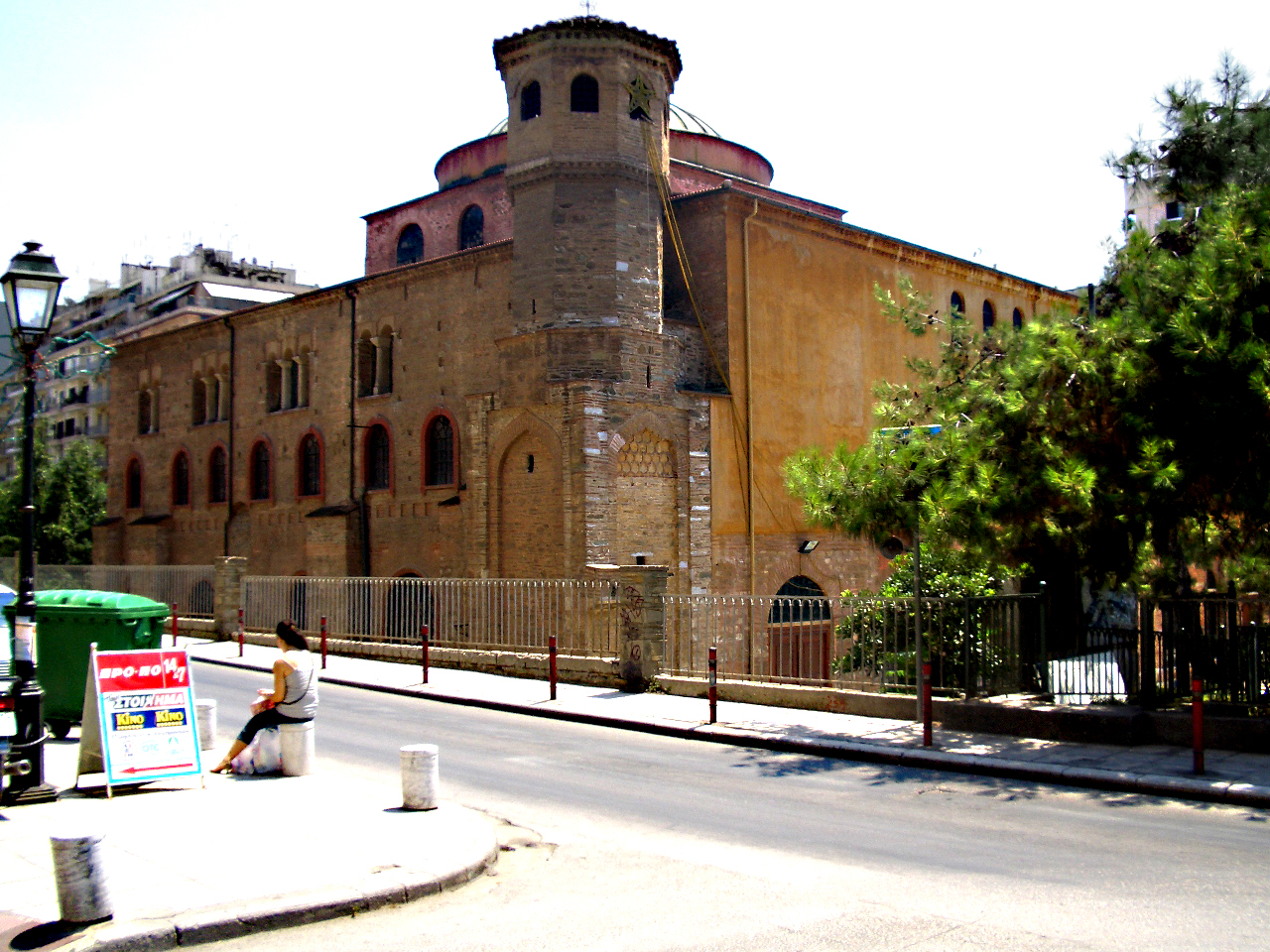
Backside view

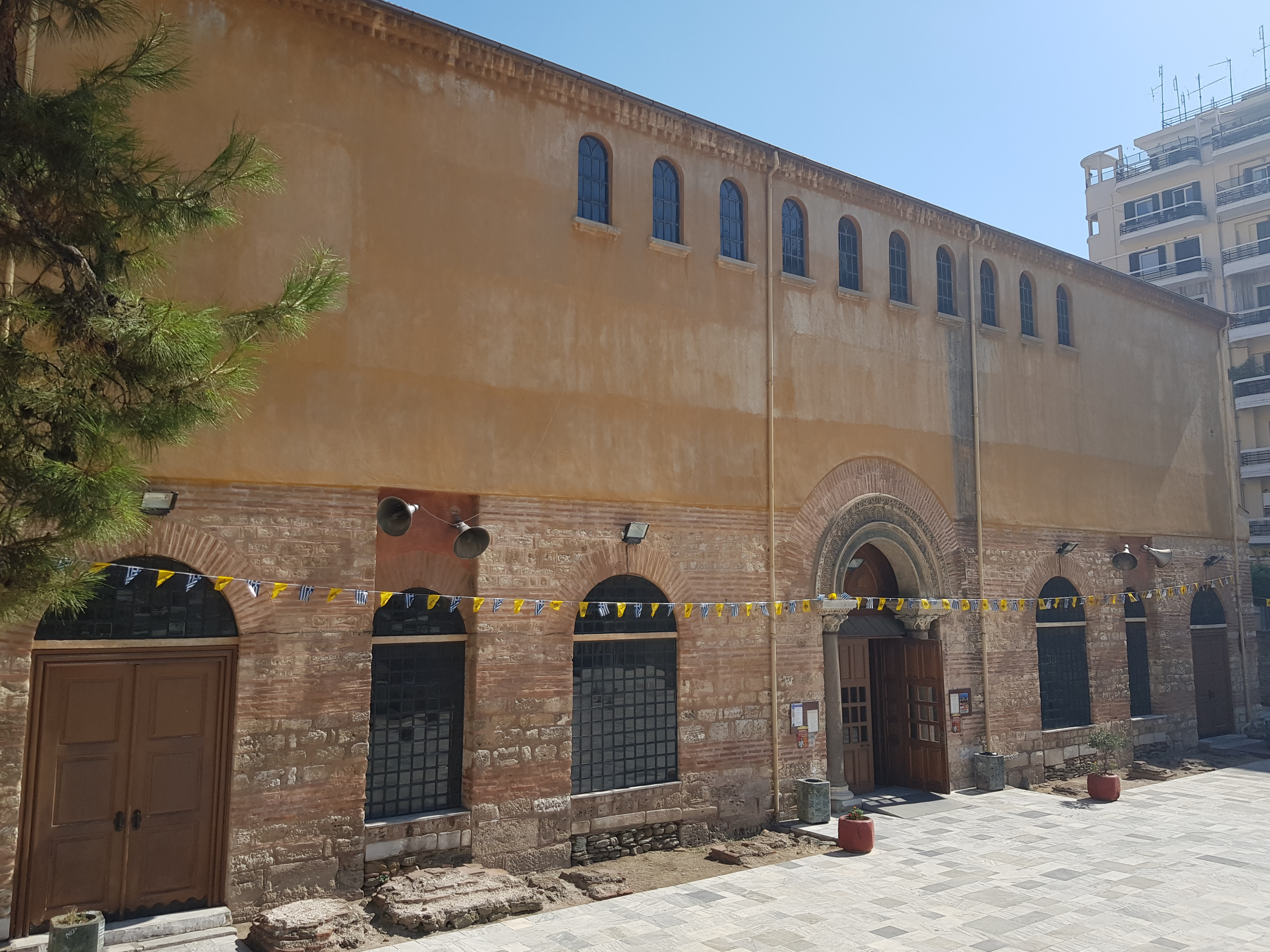
Entrance

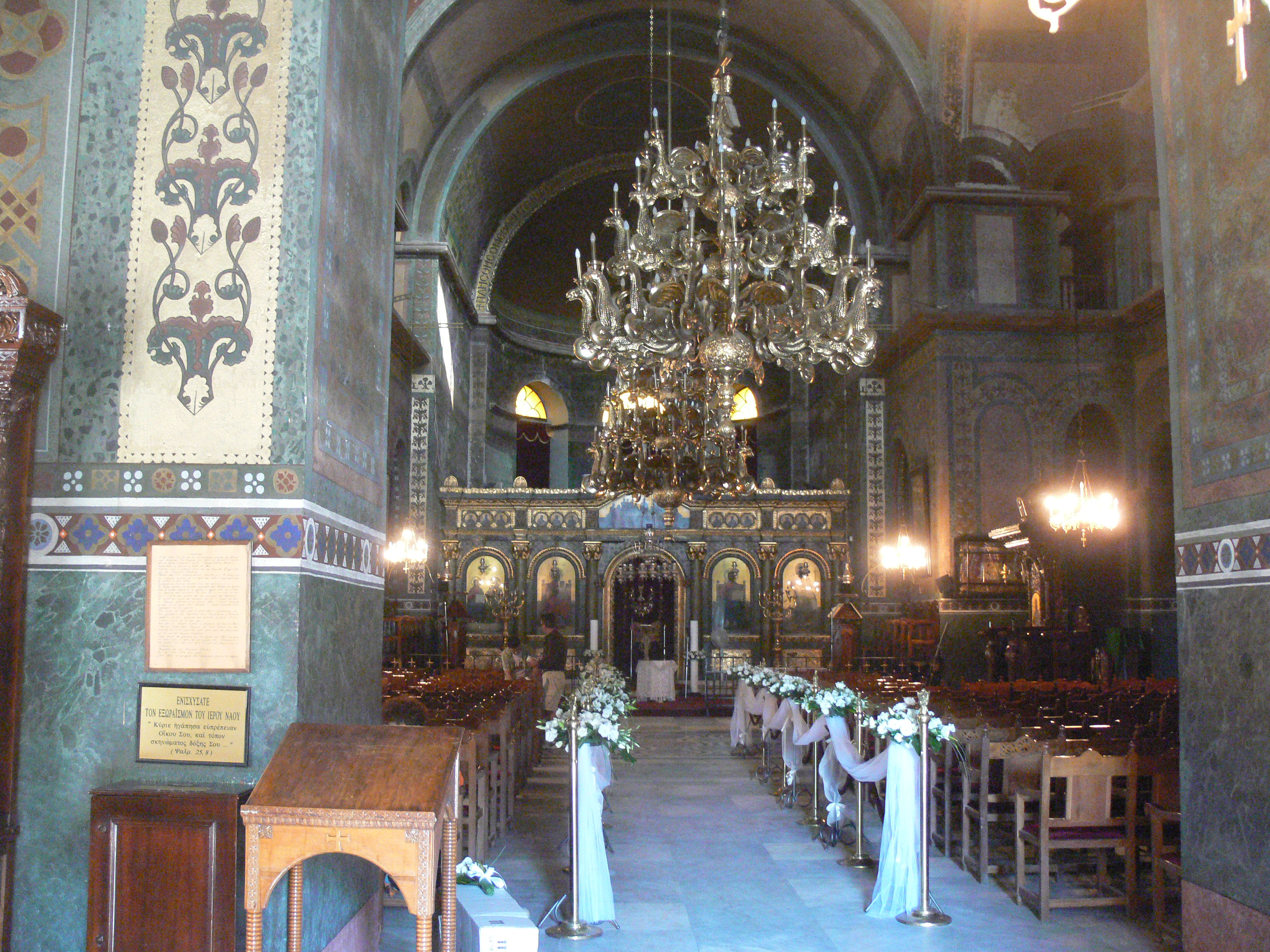
Interior view

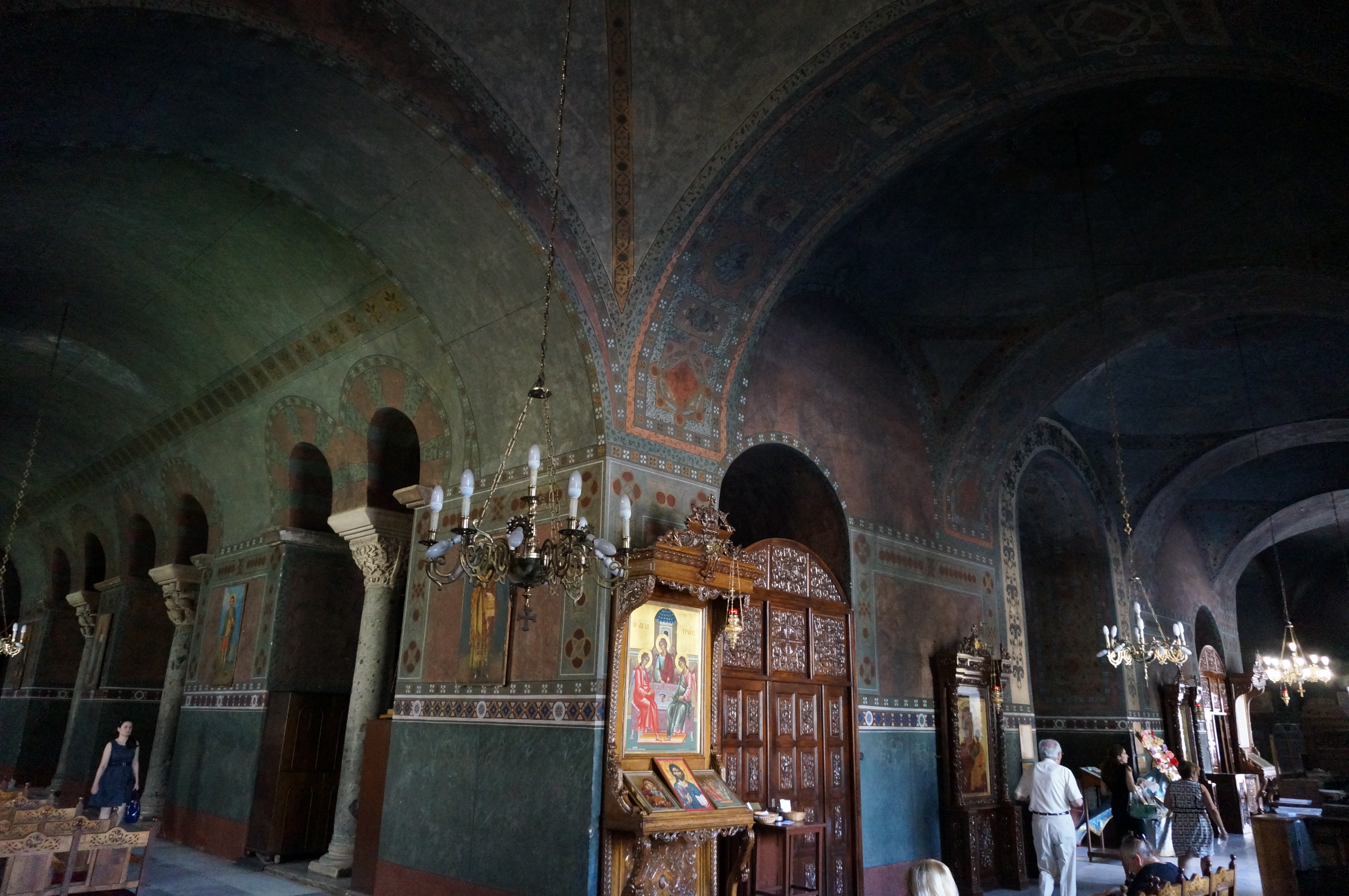
Interior

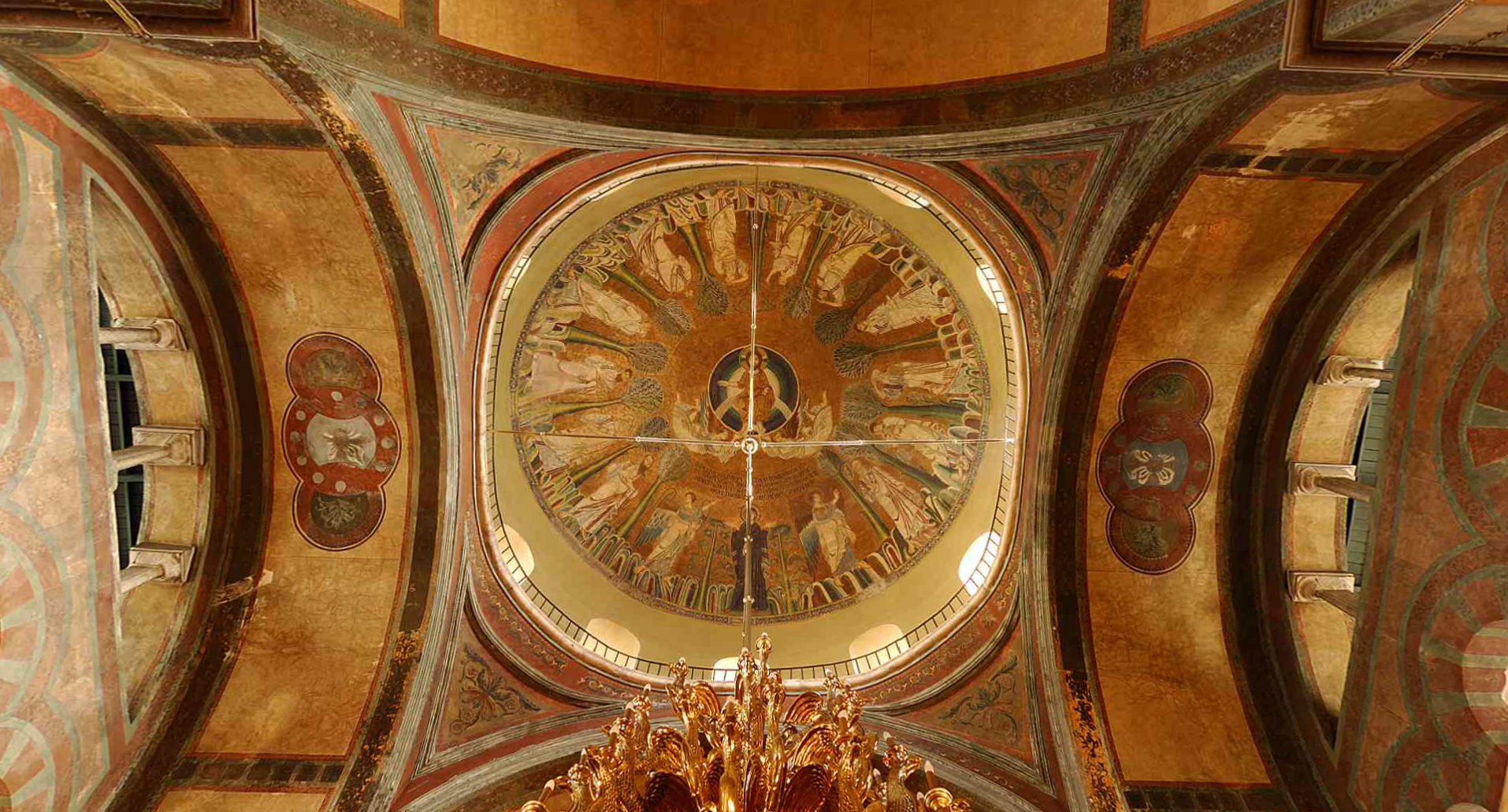
The dome with the mosaic (9th century)

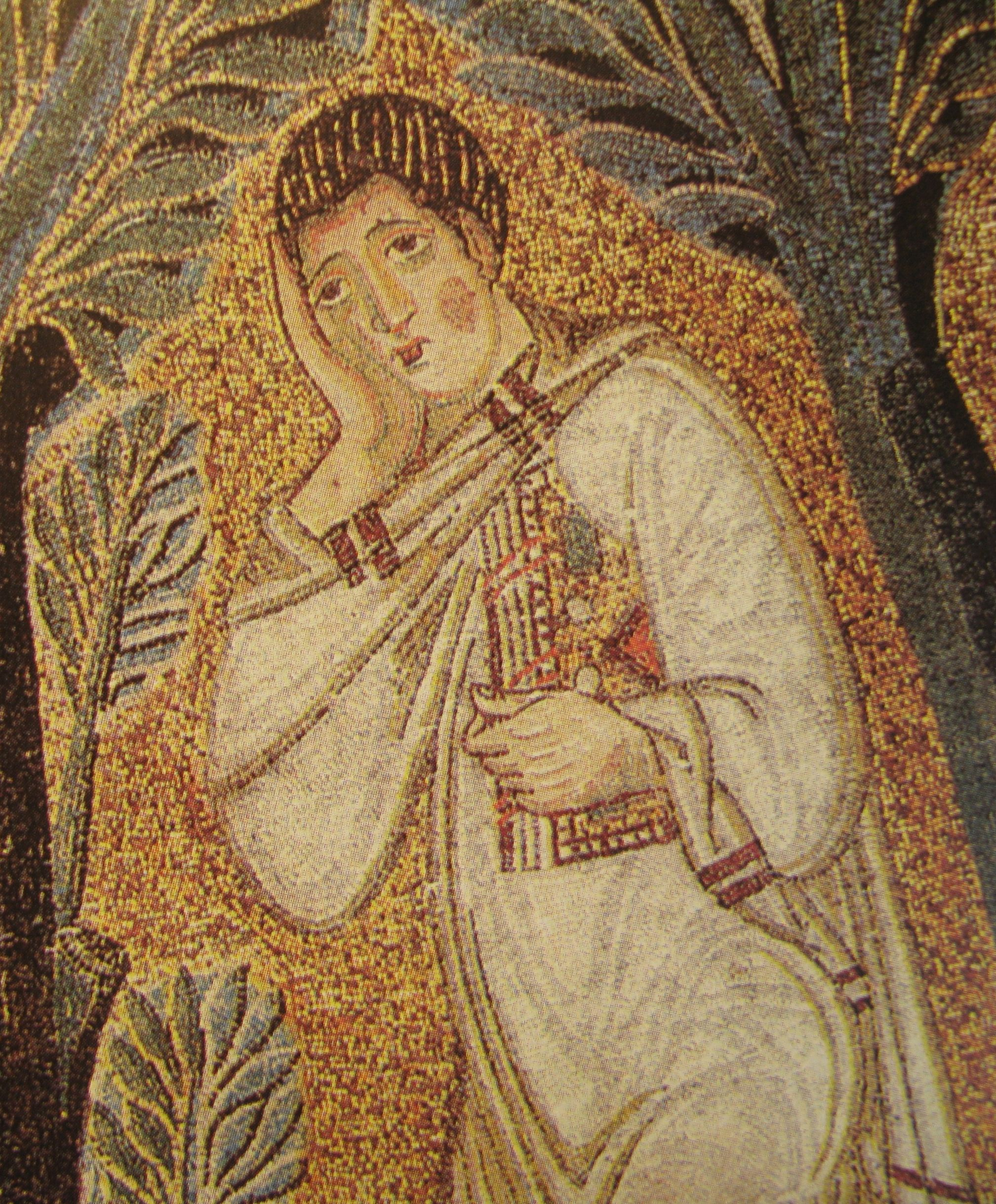
Mosaic (9th)

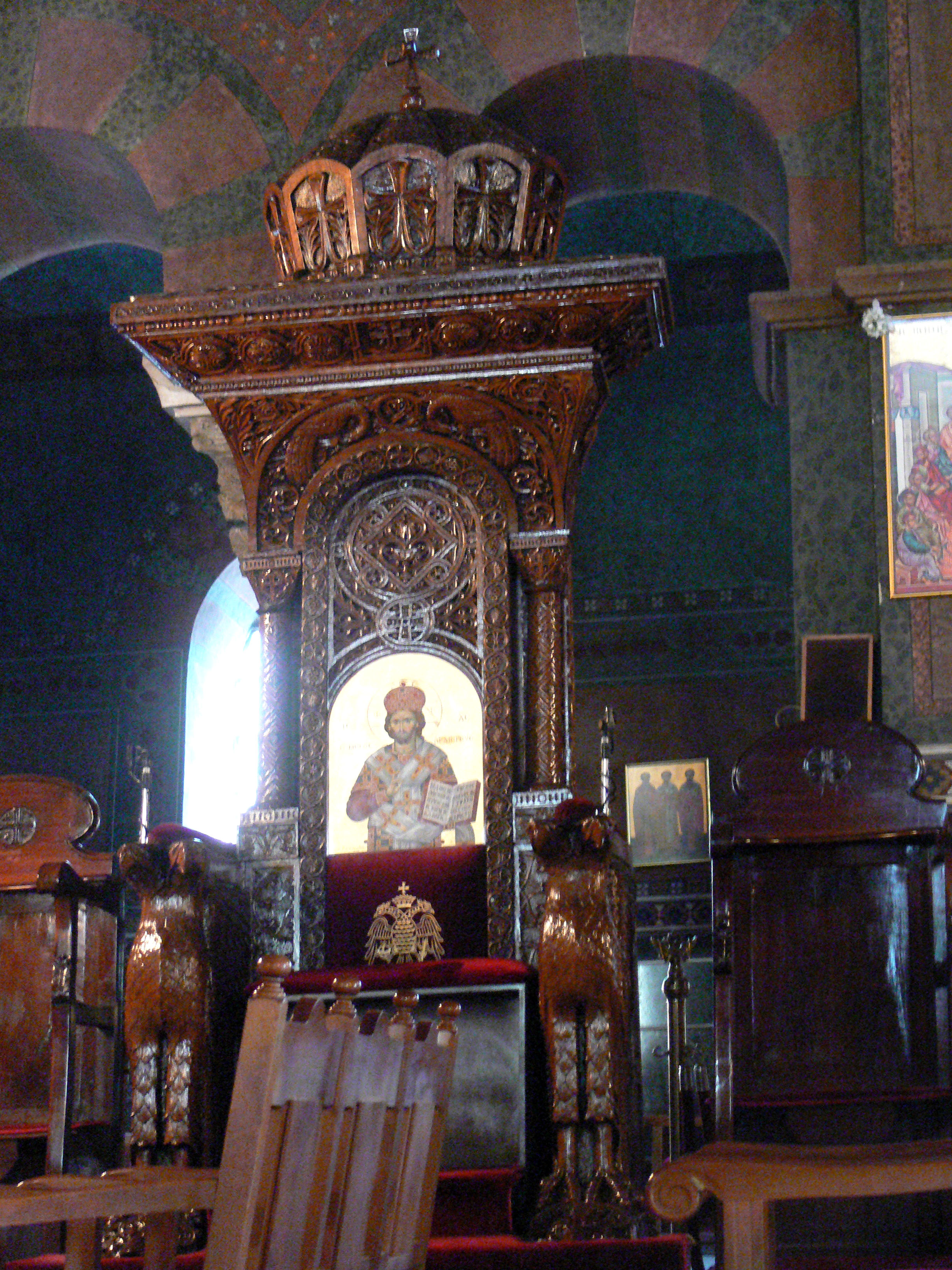
A view

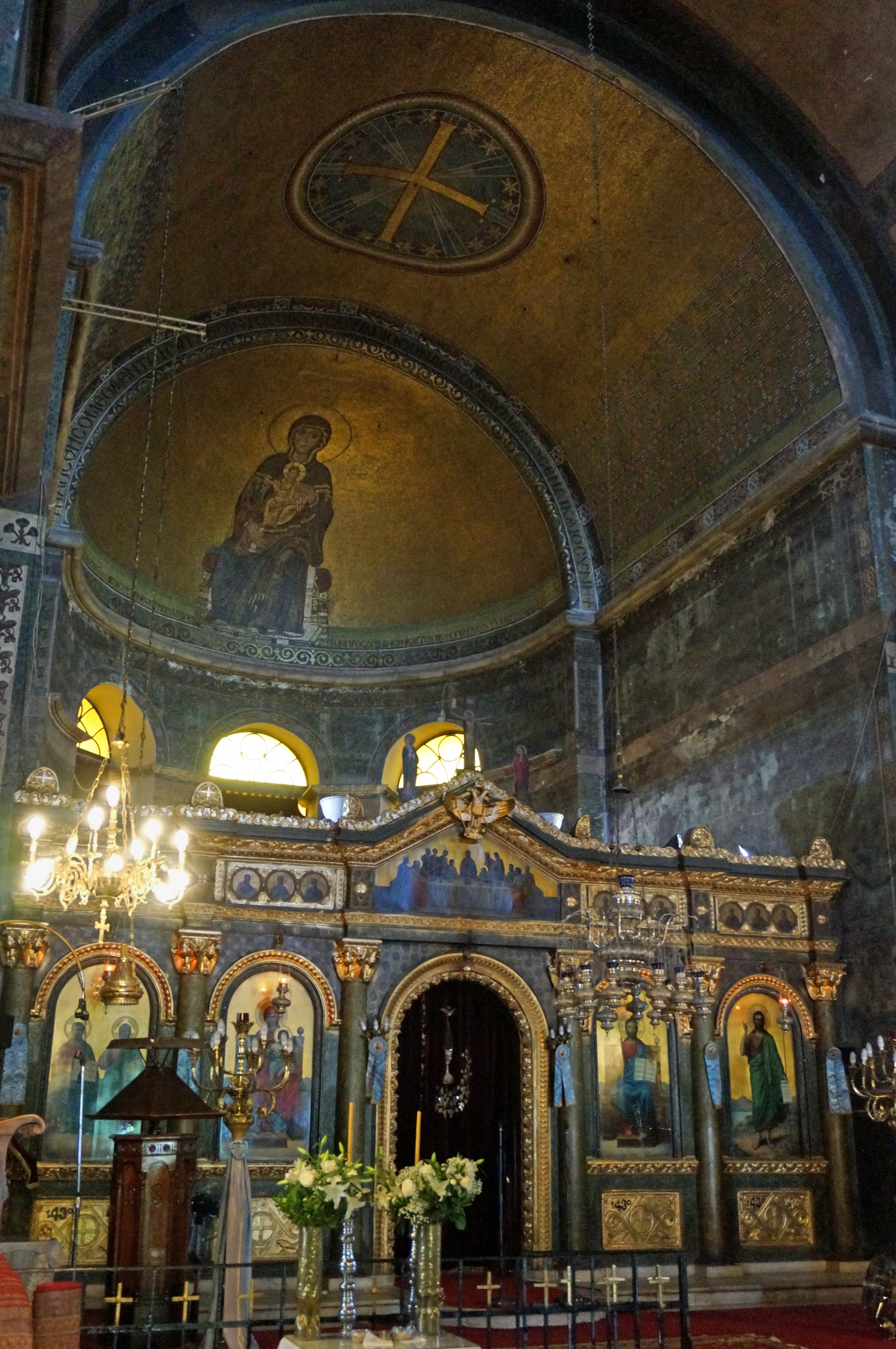
Iconostasis

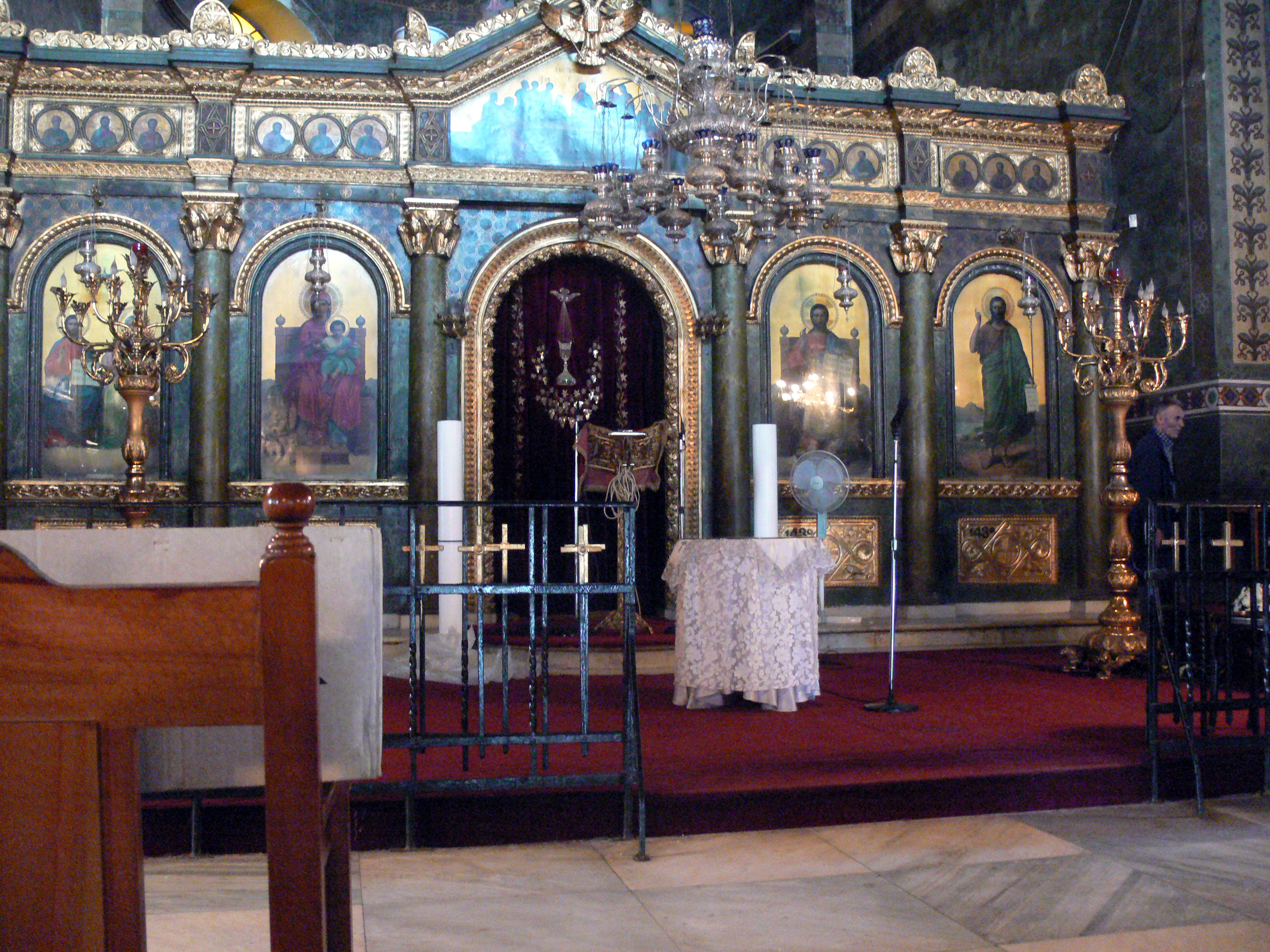
Iconostasis, close view

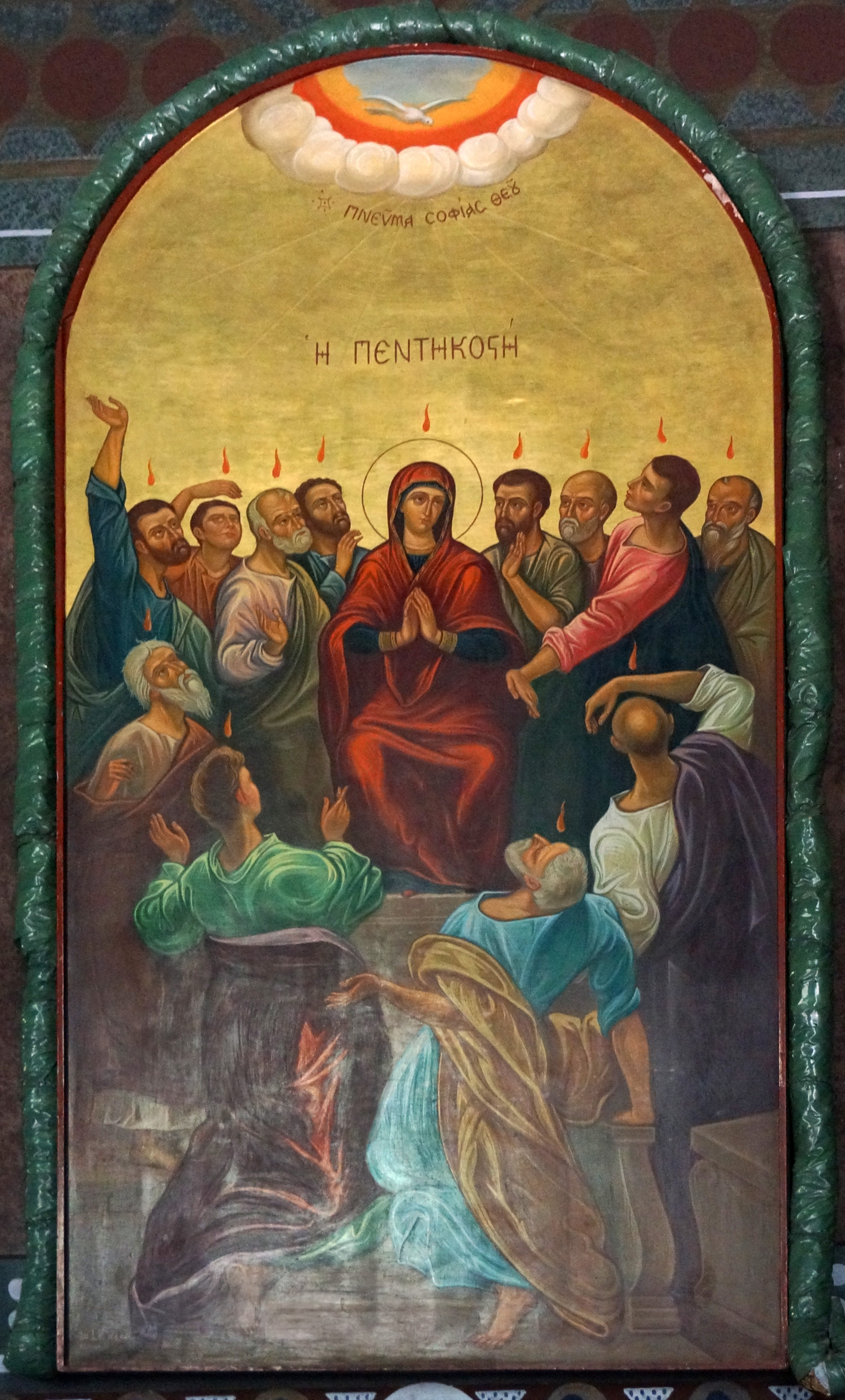
Icon of the church

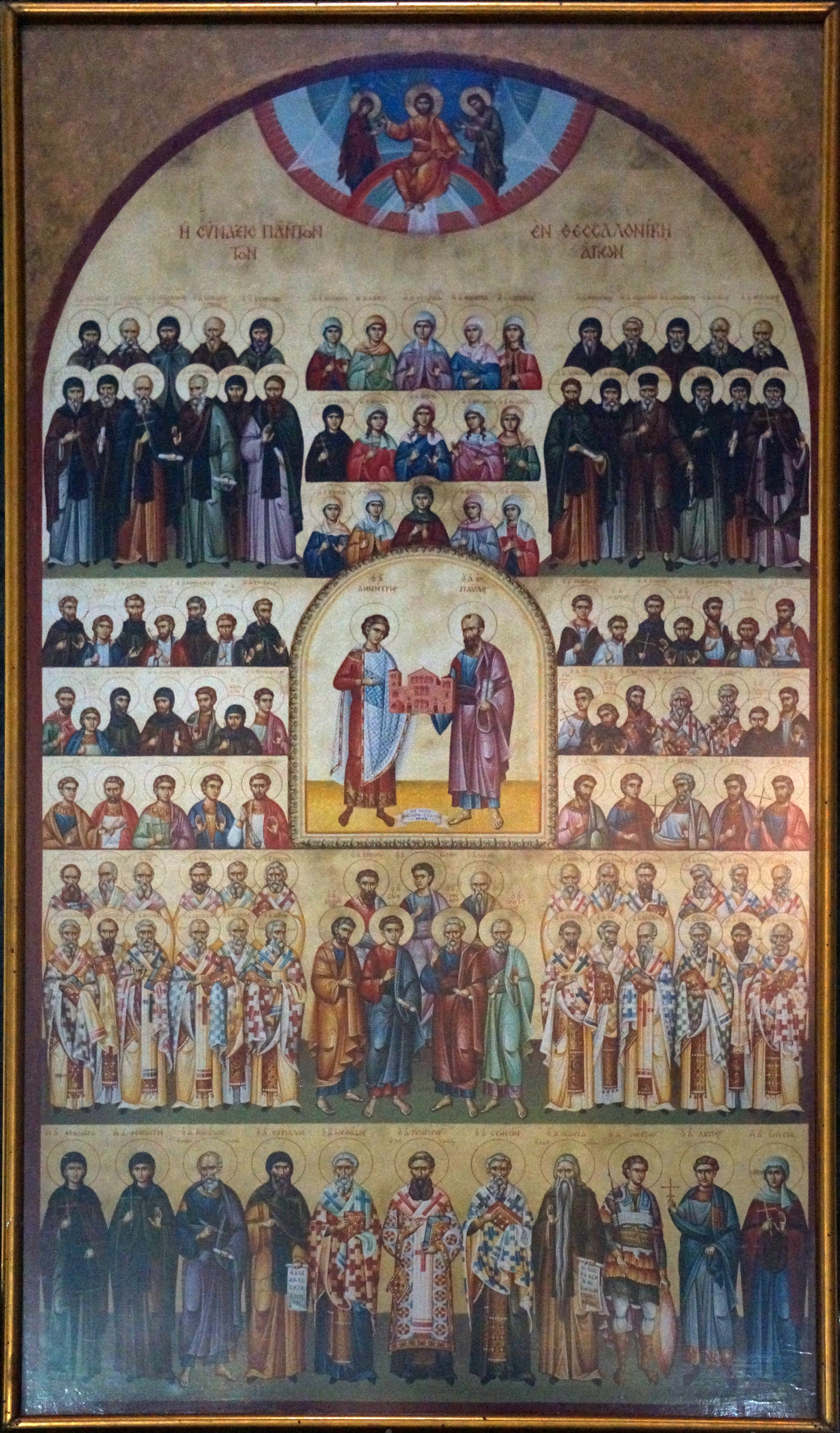
Painting

== See also ==
- Ancient Roman and Byzantine domes
- Symbolism of domes

== Bibliography ==
- Krautheimer, Richard (1986). Architettura paleocristiana e bizantina (in Italian). Einaudi, Turin.
