= Xenophon Paionidis =

Greek architect

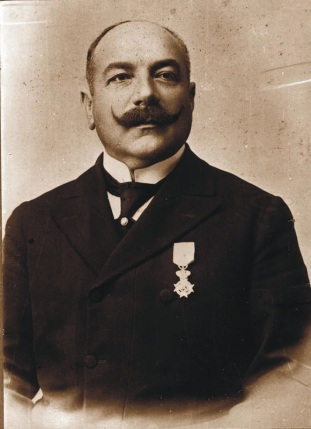
Xenophon Paionidis

Xenophon Paionidis (Greek: Ξενοφών Παιονίδης; 1863–1933) was a Greek architect from Chalkidiki (Fourka), notable for his works in the city of Thessaloniki. Among his works are the "Villa Jeborga/Salem" (former Italian consulate, 1878), "Hafiz Bey mansion" (1879), Papafeio Orphanage (1894), Ioannidis civil school (1900), Nedelkos clinic (1909), Nedelkos building (1924), "Villa Mordoch" (1905), Hotel Augustos (1923), the old Post Office "Stoa Pelosof" (1924), and others.

In Chalkidiki, he designed the Polygyros high school, such as the schools of Ormylia, Nikiti, Vasilika, Vrastama, Sykia, and Parthenonas villages. His nephew Filimon Paionidis designed some buildings in Thessaloniki.

== Gallery ==
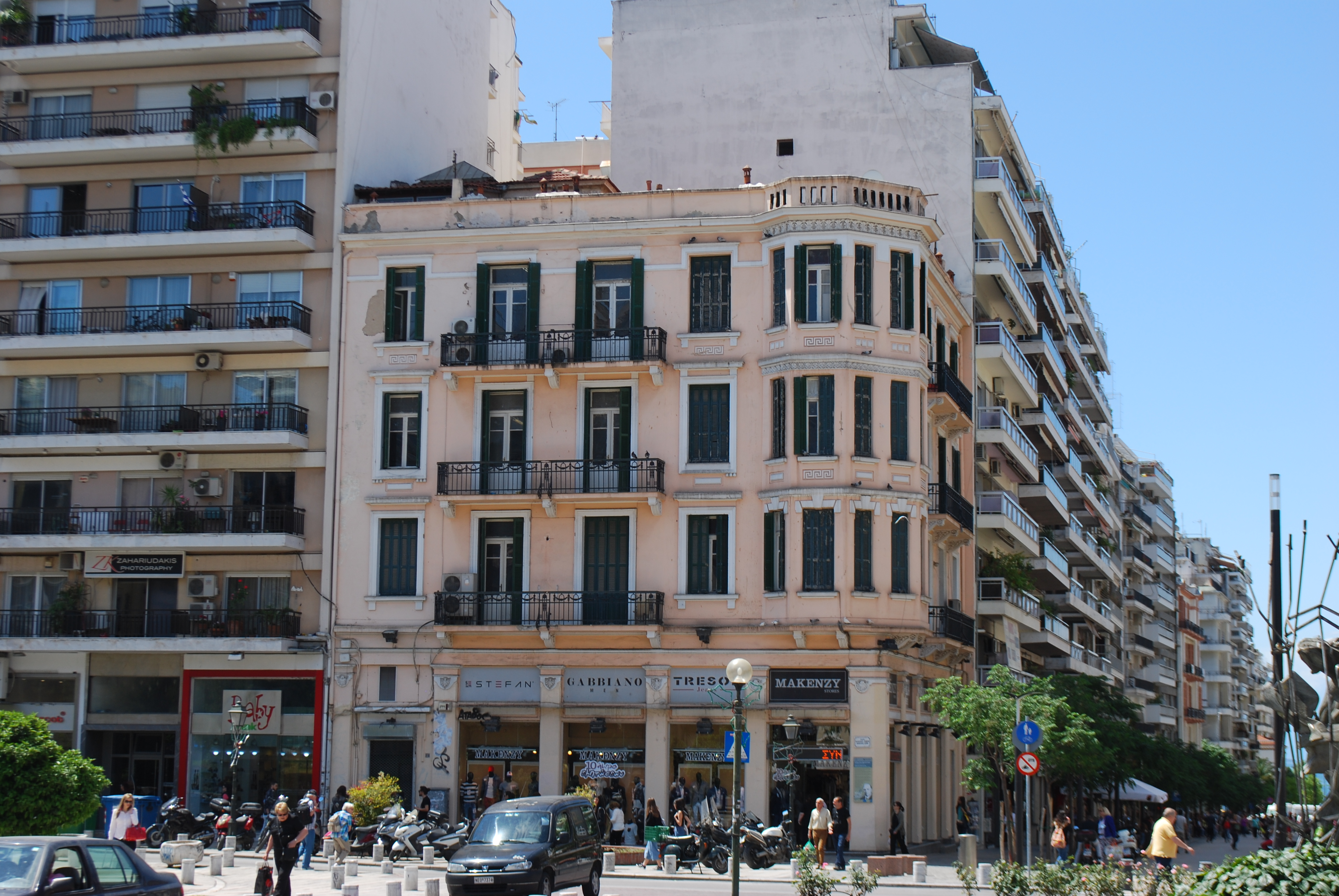
Nedelkos building, Agias Sofias Square

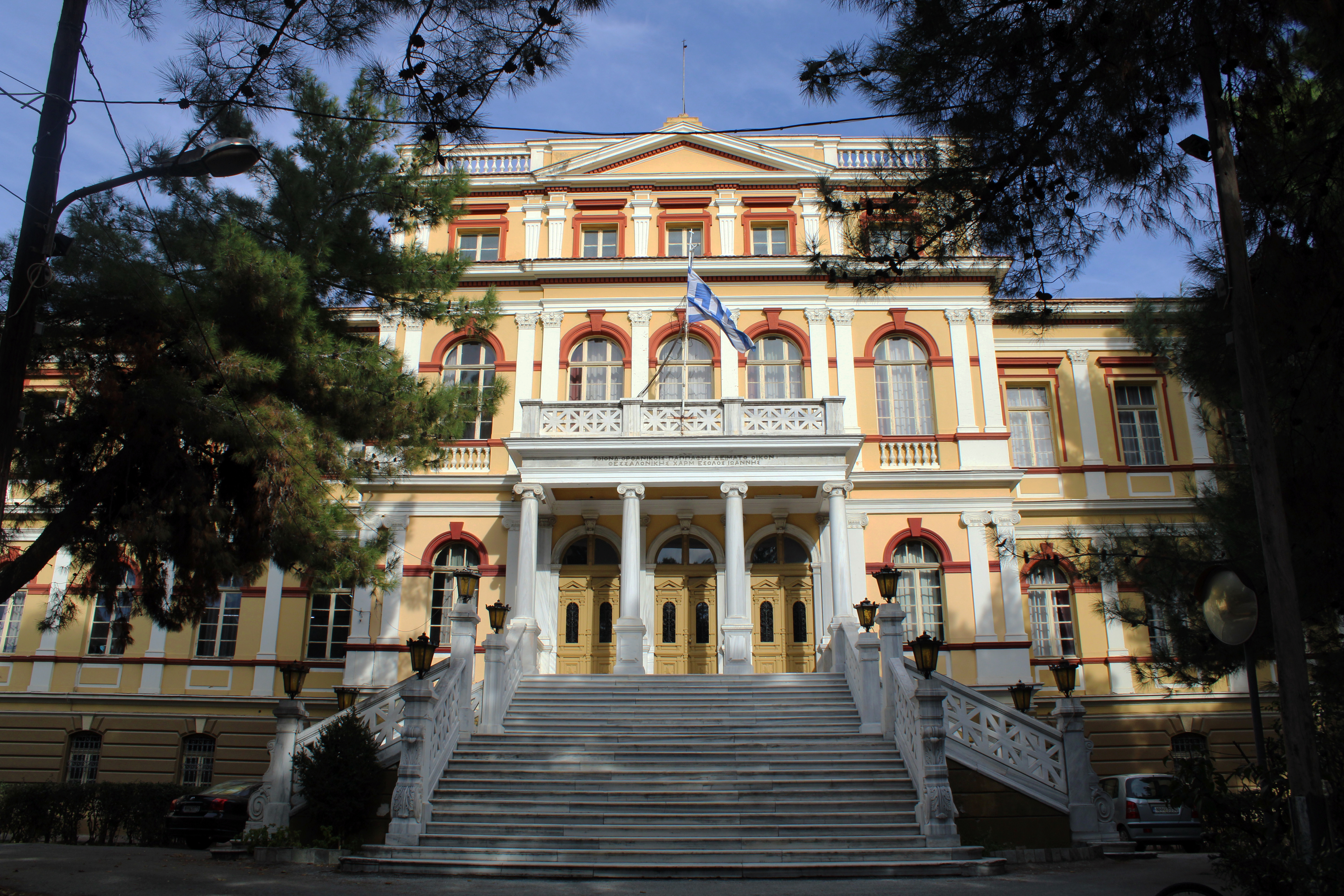
Papafeio Orphanage

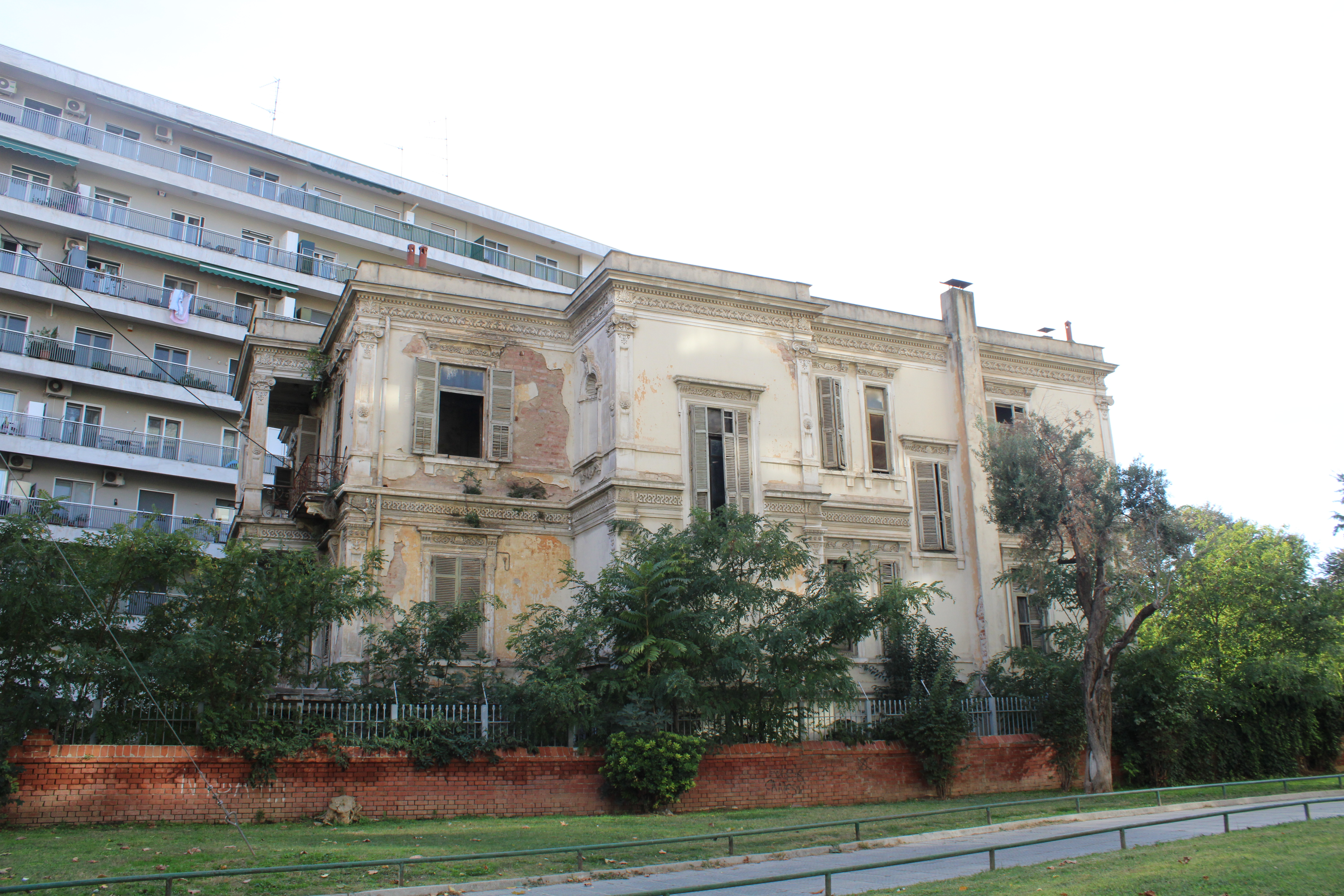
Former Italian consulate

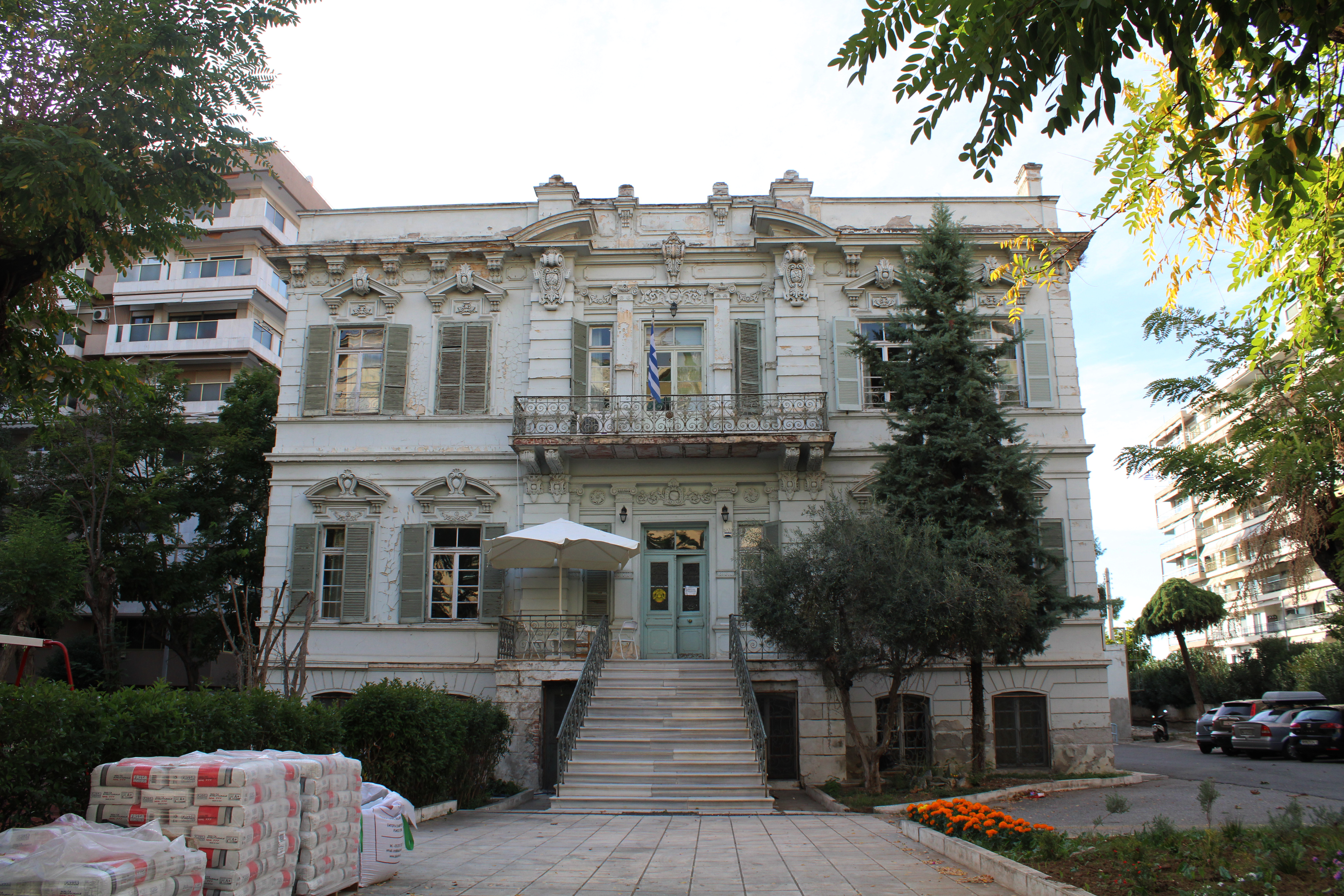
Former Hafiz Bey mansion

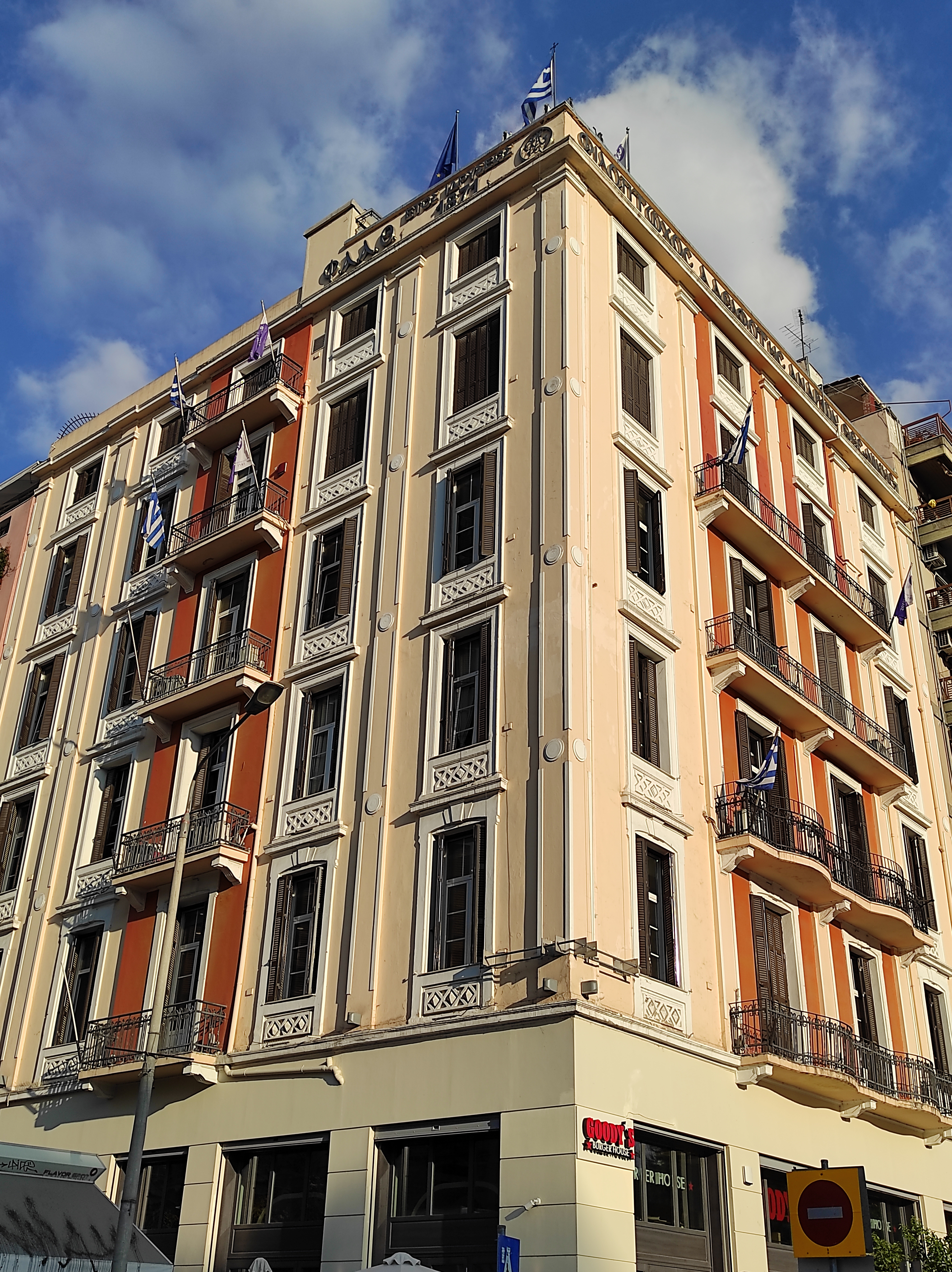
Building in Agias Sofias Square

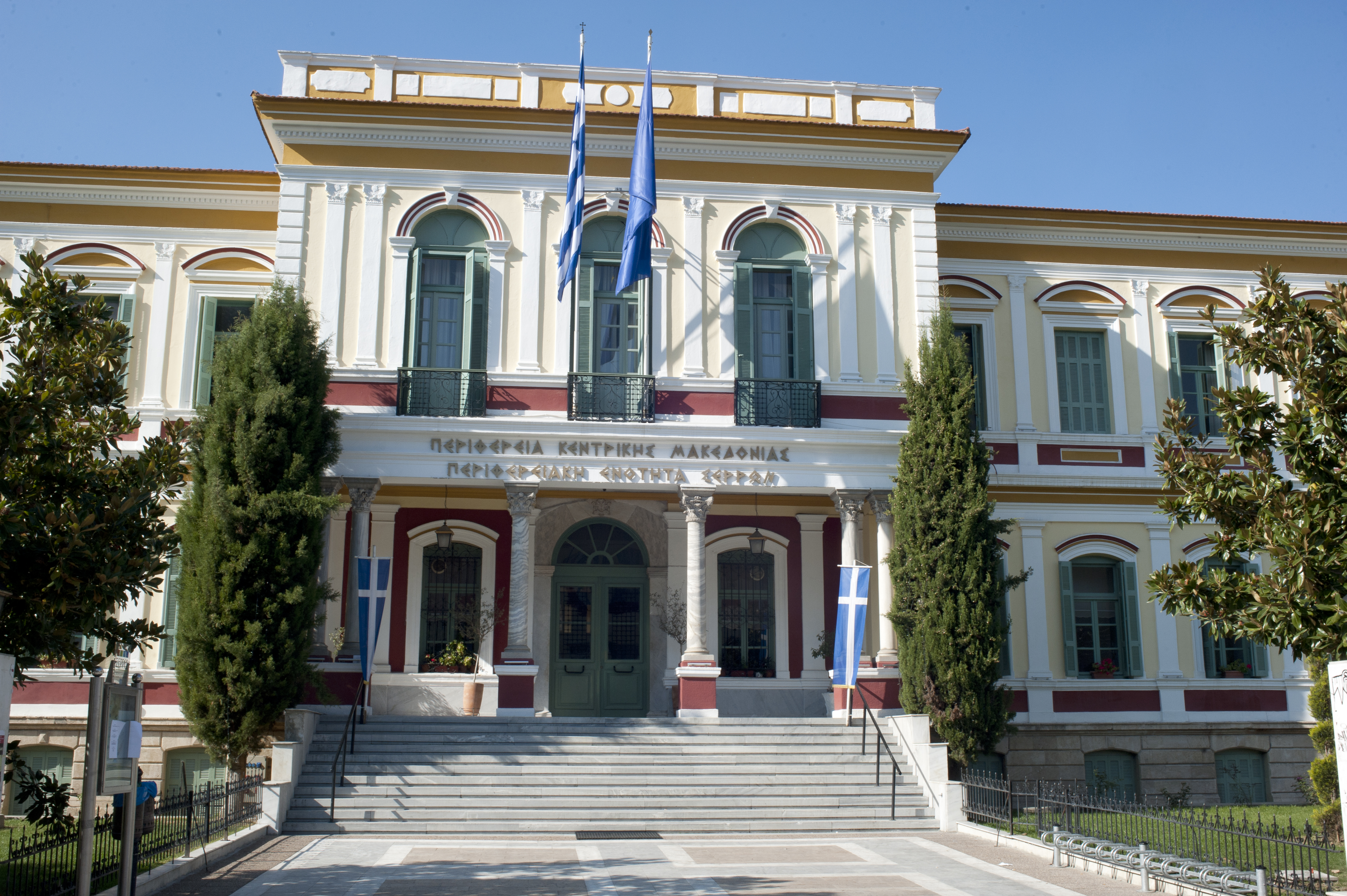
Prefecture of Serres

== Sources ==
- Ξενοφών Παιονίδης, ο αρχιτέκτονας του κλασικισμού
